= List of songs recorded by Def Leppard =

Songs recorded by Def Leppard
- Singles: 51
- Album tracks: 93
- B-sides / bonus tracks: 33
- Compilation contributions: 1

English rock band Def Leppard have recorded songs for eleven studio albums and one EP. After their formation in November 1977, Def Leppard began rehearsing and writing songs together. The band, which consisted of vocalist Joe Elliott, guitarists Steve Clark and Pete Willis, bassist Rick Savage, and drummer Tony Kenning had prepared 3 songs to be recorded on The Def Leppard E.P. in November 1978. Following the abrupt departure of Kenning, Def Leppard hired Frank Noon from The Next Band to step in on drum duties for the recording of the EP, which was released in January 1979. The EP spawned the single "Getcha Rocks Off" which began to receive airplay in the UK.

The band was soon signed to a record deal with Phonogram/Vertigo (Mercury Records in the US) and began recorded a new single "Wasted" in September 1979 with new full-time drummer Rick Allen. The single was released in November with "Hello America" as a b-side, charting at no. 61 in the UK. In December, Def Leppard recorded their first full-length studio album On Through the Night which would be released on 14 March 1980. The album, which included re-recorded versions of "Wasted", "Hello America", as well as two tracks from the EP charted at no. 15 in the UK and spawned the release of "Hello America" as a single in addition to "Rock Brigade". The band soon caught the attention of producer Robert John "Mutt" Lange who agreed to produce their sophomore effort. Recorded in early 1981, Def Leppard released High 'n' Dry in July, with two singles "Let it Go" and "Bringin' On the Heartbreak".

The band spend the next year touring in support of High 'n' Dry and began recording tracks for a third album. Willis, after being fired in July 1982, was replaced by guitarist Phil Collen, and both of them feature on Pyromania, released in January 1983. Supported by the hit singles "Photograph" and "Rock of Ages", spent several weeks at no. 2 on the Billboard 200 chart. The album, which eventually sold over ten million copies in the US also spawned the singles "Too Late for Love" and "Foolin'" in late 1983. This lineup would go onto release seven singles for their follow up album Hysteria including their only no. 1 song, "Love Bites".

With the death of Steve Clark in 1991, Def Leppard finished their sixth album Adrenalize as a four piece. Vivian Campbell joined the band in April 1992 to set the current lineup, which has gone to release a further six studio albums.

== Songs ==
Key
†	Indicates song released as a single
‡	Indicates song only released as b-side or bonus track

Song	Writer(s)	Release(s)	Year	Ref.
"10 X Bigger Than Love"	Joe Elliott; Phil Collen; Vivian Campbell; Rick Savage; Rick Allen	Long, Long Way to Go ‡	2003	
"10538 Overture"	Jeff Lynne	Yeah!	2006	
"20th Century Boy" †	Marc Bolan	Yeah!	2006	
"21st Century Sha La La La Girl" †	Phil Collen; Joe Elliott; Rick Savage	Euphoria	1999	
"Action! Not Words"	Mutt Lange; Steve Clark; Joe Elliott	Pyromania	1983	
"Action" †	Andy Scott; Brian Connolly; Steve Priest; Mick Tucker	Make Love Like a Man; Retro Active	1992; 1993	
"All I Want is Everything" †	Joe Elliott	Slang	1996	
"All Night"	Phil Collen; Mutt Lange	Euphoria	1999	
"All on Your Touch"	Vivian Campbell	Slang (deluxe edition) ‡	2014	
"All Time High"	Joe Elliott	Def Leppard	2015	
"All We Need"	Phil Collen; Joe Elliott	Diamond Star Halos	2022	
"American Girl"	Tom Petty	Yeah! (Walmart bonus EP) ‡	2006	
"Angels (Can't Help You Now)"	Joe Elliott	Diamond Star Halos	2022	
"Animal" †	Steve Clark; Phil Collen; Joe Elliott; Mutt Lange; Rick Savage	Hysteria	1987	
"Another Hit and Run"	Rick Savage; Joe Elliott	High 'n' Dry	1981	
"Answer to the Master"	Pete Willis; Steve Clark; Rick Savage; Joe Elliott	On Through the Night	1980	
"Armageddon It" †	Steve Clark; Phil Collen; Joe Elliott; Mutt Lange; Rick Savage	Hysteria	1987	
"Back in Your Face" †	Joe Elliott; Phil Collen	Euphoria	1999	
"Bad Actress"	Joe Elliott	Songs from the Sparkle Lounge	2008	
"Battle of My Own"	Rick Savage; Joe Elliott	Def Leppard	2015	
"Billy's Got a Gun"	Steve Clark; Rick Savage; Pete Willis; Mutt Lange; Joe Elliott	Pyromania	1983	
"Blind Faith"	Phil Collen; Vivian Campbell; Rick Savage; Joe Elliott	Def Leppard	2015	
"Blood Runs Cold"	Phil Collen; Joe Elliott	Slang	1996	
"Breathe a Sigh" †	Phil Collen	Slang	1996	
"Bringin' On the Heartbreak" †	Steve Clark; Pete Willis; Joe Elliott	High 'n' Dry	1981	
"Broke 'N' Brokenhearted"	Phil Collen; Joe Elliott	Def Leppard	2015	
"Burnout"	Rick Allen; Vivian Campbell; Phil Collen; Joe Elliott; Rick Savage	Goodbye ‡	1999	
"'Cause We Ended as Lovers"	Phil Collen	All I Want Is Everything ‡	1996	
"C’mon C'mon" †	Rick Savage	Songs from the Sparkle Lounge	2008	
"Can't Keep Away From the Flame"	Phil Collen; Joe Elliott	When Love & Hate Collide ‡	1995	
"Come Undone"	Joe Elliott	Songs from the Sparkle Lounge	2008	
"Comin' Under Fire"	Mutt Lange; Steve Clark; Pete Willis; Joe Elliott	Pyromania	1983	
"Cruise Control"	Vivian Campbell	Songs from the Sparkle Lounge	2008	
"Cry"	Phil Collen; Joe Elliott; Vivian Campbell; Rick Savage; Rick Allen	X	2002	
"Dangerous"	Phil Collen; Joe Elliott	Def Leppard	2015	
"Day After Day" †	Phil Collen; Joe Elliott; Vivian Campbell	Euphoria	1999	
"Dear Friends"	Brian May	Yeah! (Walmart bonus EP) ‡	2006	
"Deliver Me"	Phil Collen; Joe Elliott	Slang	1996	
"Demolition Man"	Phil Collen; Vivian Campbell; Joe Elliott	Euphoria	1999	
"Desert Song" †	Steve Clark; Joe Elliott; Rick Savage	Retro Active	1993	
"Die Hard the Hunter"	Mutt Lange; Steve Clark; Rick Savage; Joe Elliott	Pyromania	1983	
"Disintegrate"	Phil Collen	Euphoria	1999	
"Don't Believe a Word"	Phil Lynott	Yeah!	2006	
"Don't Shoot Shotgun"	Steve Clark; Phil Collen; Joe Elliott; Mutt Lange; Rick Savage	Hysteria	1987	
"Drive-In Saturday"	David Bowie	Yeah!	2006	
"Elected" (live)	Alice Cooper; Glen Buxton; Michael Bruce; Dennis Dunaway; Neal Smith	Heaven Is ‡	1993	
"Energized"	Phil Collen	Def Leppard	2015	
"Everyday"	Marti Frederiksen; Phil Collen; Joe Elliott; Vivian Campbell; Rick Savage; Rick Allen	X	2002	
"Excitable"	Steve Clark; Phil Collen; Joe Elliott; Mutt Lange; Rick Savage	Hysteria	1987	
"Fire It Up" †	Phil Collen; Sam Hollander	Diamond Star Halos	2022	
"Foolin'" †	Steve Clark; Mutt Lange; Joe Elliott	Pyromania	1983	
"Forever Young"	Phil Collen; Joe Elliott	Def Leppard	2015	
"Four Letter Word" †	Phil Collen; Joe Elliott; Vivian Campbell; Rick Savage; Rick Allen	X	2002	
"Fractured Love"	Steve Clark; Joe Elliott; Rick Savage	Retro Active	1993	
"From Here to Eternity"	Rick Savage	Diamond Star Halos	2022	
"From the Inside"	Joe Elliott	Have You Ever Needed Someone So Bad; Retro Active	1992; 1993	
"Gift of Flesh"	Phil Collen	Slang	1996	
"Gimme a Job"	Joe Elliott; Phil Collen; Vivian Campbell; Rick Savage; Rick Allen	Long, Long Way to Go ‡	2003	
"Gimme a Kiss"	Joe Elliott; Phil Collen	Diamond Star Halos	2022	
"Girl Like You"	Vivian Campbell; Phil Collen; Joe Elliott; Rick Savage; Rick Allen	X	2002	
"Go"	Phil Collen; Joe Elliott	Songs from the Sparkle Lounge	2008	
"Gods of War"	Steve Clark; Phil Collen; Joe Elliott; Mutt Lange; Rick Savage	Hysteria	1987	
"Goodbye for Good This Time"	Joe Elliott	Diamond Star Halos	2022	
"Good Morning Freedom"	Steve Clark; Rick Savage; Pete Willis; Joe Elliott	Hello America ‡	1979	
"Goodbye" †	Rick Savage	Euphoria	1999	
"Gotta Let It Go"	Vivian Campbell	Songs from the Sparkle Lounge	2008	
"Gravity"	Phil Collen; Joe Elliott; Pete Woodroffe; Vivian Campbell; Rick Savage; Rick Allen	X	2002	
"Guilty"	Phil Collen; Rick Savage; Joe Elliott; Vivian Campbell; Pete Woodroffe	Euphoria	1999	
"Hallucinate"	Phil Collen	Songs from the Sparkle Lounge	2008	
"Hanging on the Telephone"	Jack Lee	Yeah!	2006	
"Have You Ever Needed Someone So Bad" †	Phil Collen; Joe Elliott; Mutt Lange	Adrenalize	1992	
"He's Gonna Step on You Again"	John Kongos; Christos Demetriou	Yeah!	2006	
"Heartbeat"	Jobriath	Yeah! (Walmart bonus EP) ‡	2006	
"Heaven Is" †	Steve Clark; Phil Collen; Joe Elliott; Mutt Lange; Rick Savage	Adrenalize	1992	
"Helen Wheels"	Paul McCartney; Linda McCartney	The Art of McCartney	2014	
"Hell Raiser"	Mike Chapman; Nicky Chinn	Yeah!	2006	
"Hello America" †	Rick Savage; Steve Clark; Joe Elliott	On Through the Night	1979	
"High 'n' Dry (Saturday Night)"	Steve Clark; Rick Savage; Joe Elliott	High 'n' Dry	1981	
"How Does It Feel"	Noddy Holder; Jim Lea	Yeah! (iTunes edition) ‡	2006	
"Hysteria" †	Steve Clark; Phil Collen; Joe Elliott; Mutt Lange; Rick Savage	Hysteria	1987	
"I Am Your Child"	Joe Elliott; Phil Collen; Rick Savage	Euphoria	1999	
"I Wanna be Your Hero"	Steve Clark; Phil Collen; Joe Elliott; Rick Savage; Mutt Lange	Hysteria (single); Retro Active	1987; 1993	
"I Wanna Touch U" †	Rick Allen; Steve Clark; Phil Collen; Joe Elliott; Mutt Lange	Adrenalize	1992	
"Immortal"	Joe Elliott	Goodbye ‡	1999	
"Invincible"	Rick Allen; Joe Elliott	Def Leppard	2015	
"It Could be You"	Pete Willis; Joe Elliott	On Through the Night	1980	
"It Don't Matter"	Pete Willis; Joe Elliott; Steve Clark	On Through the Night	1980	
"It's All About Believin'" †	Phil Collen; Jeffrey Lynn Vanston	Mirror Ball – Live & More	2011	
"It's Only Love"	Joe Elliott; Mutt Lange; Rick Savage; Vivian Campbell	Euphoria	1999	
"Jimmy's Theme"	Joe Elliott	All I Want Is Everything ‡	1996	
"Just Like 73" †	Dave Bassett; Phil Collen; Joe Elliott	Just Like 73 (single)	2024	
"Kick" †	Phil Collen; Dave Bassett	Diamond Star Halos	2022	
"Kings of Oblivion"	Joe Elliott; Phil Collen; Rick Savage	Euphoria	1999	
"Kings of the World"	Rick Savage	Mirror Ball – Live & More	2011	
"Kiss the Day"	Rick Savage; Phil Collen; Joe Elliott; Vivian Campbell; Rick Allen	X (Japanese/UK edition) ‡	2002	
"Lady Strange"	Pete Willis; Steve Clark; Rick Allen; Joe Elliott	High 'n' Dry	1981	
"Last Dance"	Rick Savage	Def Leppard	2015	
"Led Boots"	Vivian Campbell	All I Want Is Everything ‡	1996	
"Let It Go" †	Pete Willis; Steve Clark; Joe Elliott	High 'n' Dry	1981	
"Let Me be the One"	Joe Elliott; Vivian Campbell; Phil Collen; Rick Savage; Rick Allen	X	2002	
"Let's Get Rocked" †	Phil Collen; Joe Elliott; Mutt Lange; Rick Savage	Adrenalize	1992	
"Let's Go" †	Joe Elliott; Rick Savage	Def Leppard	2015	
"Lifeless"	Phil Collen; Joe Elliott	Diamond Star Halos	2022	
"Little Bit of Love"	Paul Rodgers; Paul Kossoff; Andy Fraser; Simon Kirke	Yeah!	2006	
"Liquid Dust"	Phil Collen	Diamond Star Halos	2022	
"Little Wing"	Jimi Hendrix	Have You Ever Needed Someone So Bad ‡	1992	
"Long, Long Way to Go" †	Wayne Hector; Steve Robson	X	2002	
"Love"	Rick Savage	Songs from the Sparkle Lounge	2008	
"Love and Affection"	Steve Clark; Phil Collen; Joe Elliott; Mutt Lange; Rick Savage	Hysteria	1987	
"Love Bites" †	Steve Clark; Phil Collen; Joe Elliott; Mutt Lange; Rick Savage	Hysteria	1987	
"Love Don't Lie"	Joe Elliott; Phil Collen; Vivian Campbell; Rick Savage; Rick Allen	X	2002	
"Make Love Like a Man" †	Steve Clark; Phil Collen; Joe Elliott; Mutt Lange	Adrenalize	1992	
"Man Enough"	Phil Collen; Joe Elliott	Def Leppard	2015	
"Me and My Wine"	Rick Savage; Steve Clark; Joe Elliott	Bringin' On the Heartbreak; High 'n' Dry (reissue) ‡	1981; 1984	
"Mirror, Mirror (Look into My Eyes)"	Steve Clark; Joe Elliott	High 'n' Dry	1981	
"Miss You in a Heartbeat" †	Phil Collen	Make Love Like a Man; Retro Active	1992; 1993	
"Move with Me Slowly"	Phil Collen	Slang (Japanese edition) ‡	1996	
"Nine Lives" † (featuring Tim McGraw)	Phil Collen; Joe Elliott; Tim McGraw; Rick Savage	Songs from the Sparkle Lounge	2008	
"No Matter What" †	Pete Ham	Yeah!	2005	
"No No No"	Rick Savage; Pete Willis; Joe Elliott	High 'n' Dry	1981	
"Now I'm Here" (live with Brian May)	Brian May	Tonight ‡	1993	
"Now" †	Marti Frederiksen; Phil Collen; Joe Elliott; Vivian Campbell; Rick Savage; Rick Allen	X	2002	
"(The) Overture"	Rick Savage; Steve Clark; Pete Willis; Joe Elliott	The Def Leppard E.P. On Through the Night	1979; 1980	
"On Through the Night"	Steve Clark; Rick Savage; Joe Elliott	High 'n' Dry	1981	
"Only After Dark"	Mick Ronson; Scott Richardson	Let's Get Rocked; Retro Active	1992; 1993	
"Only the Good Die Young"	Vivian Campbell	Songs from the Sparkle Lounge	2008	
"Open Your Eyes"	Joe Elliott; Phil Collen	Diamond Star Halos	2022	
"Paper Sun" †	Phil Collen; Vivian Campbell; Joe Elliott; Rick Savage; Pete Woodroffe	Euphoria	1999	
"Pearl of Euphoria"	Joe Elliott; Phil Collen; Rick Savage	Slang	1996	
"Personal Jesus"	Martin Gore	The Story So Far – The Best Of	2018	
"Personal Property"	Phil Collen; Joe Elliott; Mutt Lange; Rick Savage	Adrenalize	1992	
"Photograph" †	Steve Clark; Pete Willis; Rick Savage; Mutt Lange; Joe Elliott	Pyromania	1983	
"Pour Some Sugar on Me" †	Steve Clark; Phil Collen; Joe Elliott; Mutt Lange; Rick Savage	Hysteria	1987	
"Promises" †	Phil Collen; Mutt Lange	Euphoria	1999	
"Rebel Rebel"	David Bowie	Now ‡	2002	
"Release Me"	Eddie Miller; Robert Yount; James Pebworth	Rocket; Armageddon It ‡	1988	
"Ride into the Sun"	Rick Savage; Joe Elliott	The Def Leppard E.P. Hysteria (single); Retro Active	1979; 1987; 1993	
"Ring of Fire"	Steve Clark; Phil Collen; Joe Elliott; Rick Savage; Mutt Lange	Armageddon It; Retro Active	1988; 1993	
"Rock Brigade" †	Rick Savage; Steve Clark; Joe Elliott	On Through the Night	1980	
"Rock of Ages" †	Steve Clark; Mutt Lange; Joe Elliott	Pyromania	1983	
"Rock On" †	David Essex	Yeah!	2006	
"Rock! Rock! (Till You Drop)"	Steve Clark; Rick Savage; Mutt Lange; Joe Elliott	Pyromania	1983	
"Rocket" †	Steve Clark; Phil Collen; Joe Elliott; Mutt Lange; Rick Savage	Hysteria	1987	
"(Getcha) Rocks Off" †	Pete Willis; Rick Savage; Steve Clark; Joe Elliott	The Def Leppard E.P. On Through the Night	1979; 1980	
"Run Riot"	Steve Clark; Phil Collen; Joe Elliott; Mutt Lange; Rick Savage	Hysteria	1987	
"S.M.C."	Phil Collen	Two Steps Behind ‡	1993	
"Satellite"	Rick Savage; Steve Clark; Pete Willis; Joe Elliott	On Through the Night	1980	
"Scar"	Phil Collen; Joe Elliott; Vivian Campbell; Rick Savage; Pete Woodroffe; Rick Allen	X	2002	
"Sea of Love"	Phil Collen	Def Leppard	2015	
"Search and Destroy"	Iggy Pop; James Williamson	Yeah! (Walmart bonus EP) ‡	2006	
"She's Too Tough"	Joe Elliott	Heaven Is; Retro Active	1993	
"Slang" †	Phil Collen; Joe Elliott	Slang	1996	
"Sorrow Is a Woman"	Rick Savage; Steve Clark; Pete Willis; Joe Elliott	On Through the Night	1980	
"SOS Emergency"	Phil Collen; Joe Elliott	Diamond Star Halos	2022	
"Space Oddity"	David Bowie	Yeah! (Walmart bonus EP) ‡	2006	
"Stagefright"	Rick Savage; Joe Elliott; Mutt Lange	Pyromania	1983	
"Stand Up (Kick Love into Motion)" †	Steve Clark; Phil Collen; Joe Elliott; Mutt Lange	Adrenalize	1992	
"Stay with Me"	Rod Stewart; Ronnie Wood	Yeah!	2006	
"Street Life"	Bryan Ferry	Yeah!	2006	
"Switch 625"	Steve Clark	High 'n' Dry	1981	
"Take What You Want" †	Rick Savage; Joe Elliott	Diamond Star Halos	2022	
"Tear It Down"	Steve Clark; Phil Collen; Joe Elliott; Rick Savage	Adrenalize	1992	
"The Golden Age of Rock 'n' Roll"	Ian Hunter	Yeah!	2006	
"This Guitar"	Phil Collen; C.J. Vanston	Diamond Star Halos	2022	
"To Be Alive"	Vivian Campbell; P.J. Smith	Euphoria	1999	
"Tomorrow"	Phil Collen	Songs from the Sparkle Lounge	2008	
"Tonight" †	Steve Clark; Phil Collen; Joe Elliott; Mutt Lange; Rick Savage	Adrenalize	1992	
"Too Late For Love" †	Steve Clark; Mutt Lange; Pete Willis; Rick Savage; Joe Elliott	Pyromania	1983	
"Torn to Shreds"	Phil Collen; Rick Savage; Joe Elliott; Vivian Campbell; Rick Allen	X	2002	
"Travelin' Band" (live with Brian May)	John Fogerty	Pyromania (deluxe edition) ‡	2009	
"Truth?"	Phil Collen; Joe Elliott; Rick Savage; Vivian Campbell	Slang	1996	
"Turn to Dust"	Phil Collen	Slang	1996	
"Two Steps Behind" †	Joe Elliott	Make Love Like a Man; Last Action Hero; Retro Active	1992; 1993; 1993	
"Unbelievable"	Per Aldeheim; Andreas Carlsson; Max Martin	X	2002	
"Unbreakable"	Joe Elliott	Diamond Star Halos	2022	
"Undefeated" †	Joe Elliott	Mirror Ball – Live & More	2011	
"Under My Wheels"	Michael Bruce; Dennis Dunaway; Bob Erin	Promises; Goodbye	1999	
"U Rok Mi"	Phil Collen	Diamond Star Halos	2022	
"Wasted" †	Steve Clark; Joe Elliott	On Through the Night	1979	
"Waterloo Sunset"	Ray Davies	Yeah!	2004	
"We All Need Christmas" †	Rick Savage	The Story So Far – The Best Of	2018	
"We Belong"	Joe Elliott	Def Leppard	2015	
"When I'm Dead and Gone"	Benny Gallagher; Graham Lyle	Yeah! (Target edition) ‡	2006	
"When Love & Hate Collide" †	Joe Elliott; Rick Savage	Vault: Def Leppard Greatest Hits (1980–1995)	1995	
"When Saturday Comes"	Joe Elliott	When Saturday Comes; All I Want Is Everything ‡	1995; 1996	
"When the Walls Came Tumblin' Down"	Steve Clark; Joe Elliott; Andrew Smith	On Through the Night	1980	
"Where Does Love Go When It Dies"	Joe Elliott; Phil Collen	Slang	1996	
"White Lightning"	Phil Collen; Joe Elliott; Mutt Lange; Rick Savage	Adrenalize	1992	
"Who Do You Love"	Ian Hunter	Goodbye ‡	1999	
"Wings of an Angel"	Phil Collen; Vivian Campbell; Rick Savage; Joe Elliott	Def Leppard	2015	
"Winter Song"	Alan Hull	Yeah! (Best Buy edition) ‡	2006	
"Women" †	Steve Clark; Phil Collen; Joe Elliott; Mutt Lange; Rick Savage	Hysteria	1987	
"Work It Out" †	Vivian Campbell	Slang	1996	
"Worlds Collide"	Joe Elliott; Rick Savage	Promises; Euphoria (bonus track) ‡	1999	
"You Can't Always Get What You Want"	Mick Jagger; Keith Richards	Have You Ever Needed Someone So Bad ‡	1992	
"You Got Me Runnin'"	Pete Willis; Steve Clark; Joe Elliott	High 'n' Dry	1981	
"You're So Beautiful"	Marti Frederiksen; Phil Collen; Joe Elliott; Vivian Campbell; Rick Savage; Rick Allen	X	2002	
"Ziggy Stardust" (live)	David Bowie	Slang (single) ‡	1996	

== See also ==
- Def Leppard discography
