= List of Def Leppard band members =

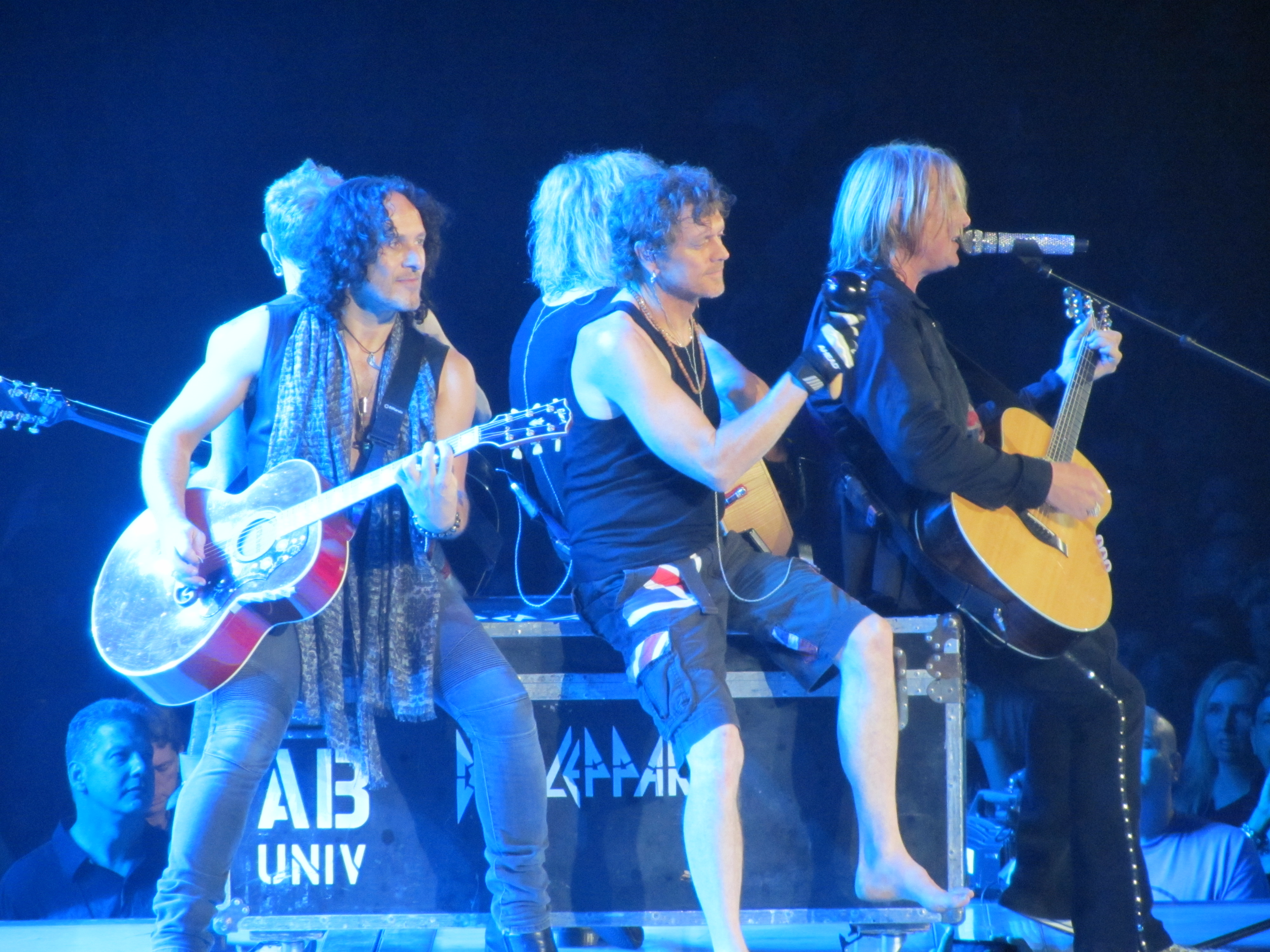
Def Leppard performing at Allstate Arena in Rosemont, Illinois, 2012

Def Leppard are an English rock band formed under the name Atomic Mass in 1977 in Sheffield as part of the new wave of British heavy metal. At the time of the band changing their name to Def Leppard, they consisted of bassist Rick Savage, lead singer Joe Elliott, guitarist Pete Willis and drummer Tony Kenning. The band currently consists of Savage and Elliott alongside drummer Rick Allen (since 1978) and guitarists Phil Collen (since 1982) and Vivian Campbell (since 1992).

== History ==
Def Leppard evolved from Atomic Mass after vocalist Joe Elliott joined Atomic Mass in November 1977. The lineup of Elliott, drummer Tony Kenning, bassist Rick Savage, and guitarist Pete Willis was completed by the addition of guitarist Steve Clark in January 1978. The band played their first show on 18 July of that year, before recording their first EP in the fall with session drummer Frank Noon after Kenning's departure.

With the drummer position open, Rick Allen joined the band. Def Leppard recorded On Through the Night and High 'n' Dry as the five-piece of Savage, Willis, Elliott, Clark, and Allen before Pete Willis was fired in July 1982. Phil Collen of Girl replaced Willis, and the band went on to the most commercially successful period of their career, the releases of Pyromania and Hysteria.

31 December 1984, Rick Allen was involved in a car crash which involved the loss of his arm. Despite his injury, he continued to drum with the band, playing his first post accident show in Cork on 5 August 1986 with Status Quo drummer Jeff Rich providing backup.

On 8 January 1991, during a leave of absence from the band, guitarist Steve Clark was found dead in his home. Savage, Elliott, Allen, and Collen recorded their next album Adrenalize as a four-piece before Vivian Campbell joined as a second guitarist. The lineup of Def Leppard has not changed since Campbell joined the band on 15 April 1992, and is thus the longest standing lineup of the band since it began. The current lineup has released four compilations, three live albums, and seven studio albums, most recently Diamond Star Halos on 27 May 2022.

== Members ==
=== Current ===
Image	Name	Years active	Instruments	Release contributions
	Rick Savage	1977–present	bass; occasional guitar; backing vocals; keyboards	all Def Leppard releases
	Joe Elliott	1977–present	lead vocals; additional guitar; keyboards	all Def Leppard releases
	Rick Allen	1978–present	drums; percussion; backing vocals	all Def Leppard releases from On Through the Night (1980) to present
	Phil Collen	1982–present	lead and rhythm guitar; backing vocals	all Def Leppard releases from Pyromania (1983) to present
	Vivian Campbell	1992–present	lead and rhythm guitar; backing vocals	all Def Leppard releases from Retro Active (1993) to present

=== Former ===
Image	Name	Years active	Instruments	Release contributions
	Tony Kenning	1977–1978	drums; percussion	none
	Pete Willis	1977–1982	lead and rhythm guitar; backing vocals	all Def Leppard releases from The Def Leppard E.P. (1979) to Pyromania (1983)
	Steve Clark	1978–1991 (his death)	lead and rhythm guitar; backing vocals	all Def Leppard releases from The Def Leppard E.P. (1979) to Hysteria (1987); posthumous contributions on Retro Active (1993)

=== Touring ===
Image	Name	Years active	Instruments	Notes
	Jeff Rich	August 1986	drums; percussion	Played alongside Rick Allen for the first live shows back since the 1984 accident that resulted in the loss of Allen's left arm.
	Sinéad Madden	2012	fiddle	
	Steve Brown	September 2014–November 2014; June 2015; May 2018	lead and rhythm guitar; backing vocals	Trixter guitarist Steve Brown stepped in for Vivian Campbell in 2014 and 2015 while Campbell underwent treatment for Hodgkin's lymphoma. Brown also filled in for Phil Collen in May 2018 due to the birth of Collen's child.
	John Zocco	October 2024; January 2025	lead and rhythm guitar; backing vocals	Phil Collen's guitar tech Zocco filled in for Campbell when the guitarist underwent treatment for cancer.

== Session ==
Image	Name	Years active	Instruments	Release contributions
	Frank Noon	31 October 1978	drums	The Def Leppard E.P. (1979)
	Chris Hughes	December 1979	synthesizers	"Hello America" from On Through the Night (1980)
	Robert John "Mutt" Lange	1981–1987; 1998–1999	backing vocals; guitar	High 'n' Dry (1981); Pyromania (1983); Hysteria (1987); Adrenalize (1992); "Ring of Fire" from Retro Active (1993); "Promises" and "All Night" from Euphoria (1999)
	John Kongos	1982	keyboards	Pyromania (1983)
	Thomas Dolby, credited as Booker T. Boffin	1982	keyboards	Pyromania (1983)
	Melvin Mortimer, credited as Stumps Maximus	1987	lead vocals	"Release Me" B-side from Hysteria singles (2009)
	Pete Woodroffe	1991–1996	programming; piano; keyboard strings	Adrenalize (1992); Retro Active (1993); Slang (1996)
	John Sykes (died 2024)	1991	backing vocals	Adrenalize (1992)
	Phil "Crash" Nicholas	1991	keyboards	"Stand Up (Kick Love into Motion)" from Adrenalize (1992)
	P.J. Smith	April 1992	backing vocals	"Action" from Retro Active (1993)
	Michael Kamen (died 2003)	April 1993	string arrangement	"Two Steps Behind" from Retro Active (1993)
	Ian Hunter	1993	keyboards; backing vocals	Honky tonk messiah on "Ride Into the Sun" from Retro Active (1993); "The Golden Age of Rock 'n' Roll" from Yeah! (2006)
	Fiachna Ó Braonáin	March 1992	tin whistle	"From the Inside" from Retro Active (1993); "You Can't Always Get What You Want" and "Little Wing" from Adrenalize B-sides (2009)
	Liam Ó Maonlaí	March 1992	grand piano	"From the Inside" from Retro Active (1993); "You Can't Always Get What You Want" and "Little Wing" from Adrenalize B-sides (2009)
	Peter O'Toole	March 1992	mandolin	"From the Inside" from Retro Active (1993); "You Can't Always Get What You Want" and "Little Wing" from Adrenalize B-sides (2009)
	Stevie Vann	1995; 2003–2005	vocals; backing vocals	"When Love & Hate Collide" from Vault (1995); "20th Century Boy" from Yeah! (2006)
	Craig Pruess	1996	string and percussion arrangement	"Turn to Dust" from Slang (1996)
	Gavyn Wright	1996	string leader	"Turn to Dust" from Slang (1996)
	Av Singh	1996	dohl	"Turn to Dust" from Slang (1996)
	Ram Naravan	1996	Sarangi	intro for "Turn to Dust" from Slang (1996)
	Shyam Vatish	1996	Sarangi	outro for "Turn to Dust" from Slang (1996)
	Damon "Demon" Hill	1998–1999	guitar	end solo on "Demolition Man" from Euphoria (1999)
	Stan Schiller	2002	guitar	shredding tele licks on "Gravity" from X (2002)
	Eric Carter	2002	keyboards; drum loops	""Now"" (2002); "You're So Beautiful" and "Everyday" from X (2002)
	John "Bro" Campbell	2003–2005	saxophone	"20th Century Boy" (2002); "Street Life", "Drive-In Saturday" and "The Golden Age of Rock 'n' Roll" from Yeah! (2006)
	Justin Hawkins	2003–2005	backing vocals	"Hell Raiser" from Yeah! (2006)
	Anita Thomas-Collen	2003–2005	backing vocals	"The Golden Age of Rock 'n' Roll" from Yeah! (2006)
	Kristine Elliott	2003–2005	backing vocals	"The Golden Age of Rock 'n' Roll" from Yeah! (2006)
	Ronan McHugh	2003–2005	mellotron	"Drive-In Saturday" and "Little Bit of Love" from Yeah! (2006)
	Emm Gryner	2003–2005	piano; backing vocals	"The Golden Age of Rock 'n' Roll" from Yeah! (2006)
	Marc Danzeisen	2003–2005	drums; backing vocals	"American Girl" from Yeah! (2006)
	Tim McGraw	2008	lead vocals	"Nine Lives" from Songs from the Sparkle Lounge (2008)
	Dick Decent	2011	piano; backing vocals	"Kings of the World" from Mirror Ball – Live & More (2011)
	Ronan McHugh	2014–2015; 2022	keyboards; bouzouki; Mellotron; drum programming; production	Def Leppard (2015); Diamond Star Halos (2022)
	Debbi Blackwell-Cook	2014–2015; 2022	backing vocals	"Sea of Love" from Def Leppard (2015); "Kick", "Fire It Up", "Gimme a Kiss" and Angels (Can't Help You Now)" from Diamond Star Halos (2022)
	Dave Bassett	2022	backing vocals	"Kick" and "Fire It Up" Diamond Star Halos (2022)
	Alison Krauss	2022	lead vocals	"This Guitar" and "Lifeless" from Diamond Star Halos (2022)
	Mike Garson	2022	piano	Goodbye for Good This Time" and "Angels (Can't Help You Now)" from Diamond Star Halos (2022)
	Eric Gorfain	2022	string arrangements	"This Guitar", "Goodbye for Good This Time" and "Angels (Can't Help You Now)" from Diamond Star Halos (2022)

== Atomic Mass members (1977) ==
Image	Name	Years active	Instruments
	Nicholas Mackley	July–October 1977	vocals
	Paul Hampshire	July–September 1977	bass
	Pete Doubleday	July–August 1977	guitar
	Andy Nicholas	September–October 1977	bass
	Paul Holland	October 1977	vocals

== Lineups ==
Period	Members	Releases
July – Early August 1977 (Atomic Mass)	Nicholas Mackley – vocals; Pete Doubleday – guitar; Rick Savage – guitar, backing vocals; Paul Hampshire – bass; Tony Kenning – drums	none
Early – 10 August 1977 (Atomic Mass)	Nicholas Mackley – vocals; Pete Doubleday – guitar; Rick Savage – guitar, backing vocals; Pete Willis – guitar, backing vocals; Paul Hampshire – bass; Tony Kenning – drums	none
10 August – September 1977 (Atomic Mass)	Nicholas Mackley – vocals; Pete Willis – guitar, backing vocals; Rick Savage – guitar, backing vocals; Paul Hampshire – bass; Tony Kenning – drums	none
September – Early October 1977 (Atomic Mass)	Nicholas Mackley – vocals; Pete Willis – guitar, backing vocals; Rick Savage – guitar, backing vocals; Andy Nicholas – bass; Tony Kenning – drums	none
Early – 25 October 1977 (Atomic Mass)	Paul Holland – vocals; Pete Willis – guitar, backing vocals; Rick Savage – guitar, backing vocals; Andy Nicholas – bass; Tony Kenning – drums	none
25 October 1977 – 29 January 1978 (Atomic Mass/Deaf Leopard/Def Leppard)	Joe Elliott – lead vocals, guitar; Pete Willis – guitar, backing vocals; Rick Savage – bass, backing vocals; Tony Kenning – drums	none
29 January – 31 October 1978 (Def Leppard)	Joe Elliott – lead vocals; Pete Willis – guitar, backing vocals; Steve Clark – guitar, backing vocals; Rick Savage – bass, backing vocals; Tony Kenning – drums	none
31 October – 1 November 1978 (Def Leppard)	Joe Elliott – lead vocals; Pete Willis – guitar, backing vocals; Steve Clark – guitar, backing vocals; Rick Savage – bass, backing vocals; Frank Noon – drums (session)	The Def Leppard E.P. (1979)
1 November 1978 – 11 July 1982 (Def Leppard)	Joe Elliott – lead vocals; Pete Willis – guitar, backing vocals; Steve Clark – guitar, backing vocals; Rick Savage – bass, backing vocals; Rick Allen – drums, backing vocals	On Through the Night (1980); High 'n' Dry (1981)
11 July 1982 – 8 January 1991 (Def Leppard)	Joe Elliott – lead vocals, additional guitar, keyboards; Phil Collen – guitar, backing vocals (tracks 1–3, 6 & 7 on Pyromania); Steve Clark – guitar, backing vocals; Pete Willis – guitar, backing vocals (on all of Pyromania); Rick Savage – bass, backing vocals, keyboards; Rick Allen – drums, backing vocals	Pyromania (1983); Hysteria (1987)
8 January 1991 – 15 April 1992 (Def Leppard)	Joe Elliott – lead vocals, guitar, keyboards; Phil Collen – guitar, backing vocals; Rick Savage – bass, backing vocals, keyboards; Rick Allen – drums, backing vocals	Adrenalize (1992)
15 April 1992 – Present (Def Leppard)	Joe Elliott – lead vocals, additional guitar, keyboards; Phil Collen – guitar, backing vocals; Vivian Campbell – guitar, backing vocals; Rick Savage – bass, backing vocals, keyboards; Rick Allen – drums, occasional backing vocals	Retro Active (1993); Vault (1995); Slang (1996); Euphoria (1999); X (2002); Yeah! (2006); Songs from the Sparkle Lounge (2008); Def Leppard (2015); Diamond Star Halos (2022)

== See also ==
- Def Leppard discography
- List of awards and nominations received by Def Leppard
