= The Early Years 79–81 =

Box set by Def Leppard
- Released: 20 March 2020
- Recorded: 1979–1981
- Genres: Hard rock, heavy metal
- Length: 264:40
- Label: UMC

Def Leppard chronology
The Story So Far – The Best Of (2018)	The Early Years 79–81 (2020)	Diamond Star Halos (2022)

Professional ratings
Review scores
Source	Rating
AllMusic	4.5/5 stars

The Early Years 79–81 is a five-disc box set by the English rock group Def Leppard, released by UMC on 20 March 2020. The set includes remastered versions of the band's first two studio albums: On Through the Night (originally released in 1980) and High 'n' Dry (originally released in 1981), plus songs from the band's 1979 EP, a complete live concert recording from 1980, and a variety of B-sides, studio outtakes, and BBC Radio appearances from the band's formative period between 1979 and 1981.

== Background ==
In late 2019, Def Leppard announced the impending release of a collection of material from their formative years, to include the first ever official live recordings featuring guitarist Pete Willis, who left the band in 1982. The release coincided with the 40th anniversary of their debut album On Through the Night. The box set collects material from the period in which Def Leppard was considered a leading band in the New Wave of British Heavy Metal.

The collection was curated by singer Joe Elliott, with remastering overseen by the band's longtime sound engineer Ronan McHugh. The physical release includes a history written by Classic Rock writer Paul Elliott plus personal messages from the band, rare photos, and memorabilia.

The 1980 live set was recorded at the New Theatre in Oxford, and had never before been released. Included among the early songs recorded live in 1980 are "When the Rain Falls", which was later re-written as "Let It Go" for the High 'n' Dry album, and "Medicine Man" which became "Rock! Rock! (Till You Drop)" on the band's 1983 album Pyromania. The live recordings were not edited in any fashion.

Also included are remixes of "Bringin' On the Heartbreak" and "Me and My Wine" that were added to a 1984 reissue of High 'n' Dry, and an early version of "Rock Brigade" produced by Nick Tauber that was intended as a British single but never released.

== Reception ==
According to AllMusic, "The Early Years 79–81 set captures Def Leppard as they burst onto the scene and quickly refined their sound into something millions of people couldn't get enough of," and that the box set is "interesting enough historically, and it's definitely worth it to true Def Lep devotees." Spectrum Culture called the box set "an effective introduction to the uninitiated, charting the giddy origins from which the Sheffield stalwarts rocketed to stadium-conquering heights," and "a compulsory addition to the collection of any seasoned Def Leppard follower."

== Track listing ==
On Through the Night (disc one)
No.	Title	Writer(s)	Length
1.	"Rock Brigade"	Steve Clark; Joe Elliott; Rick Savage	3:08
2.	"Hello America"	Clark; Elliott; Savage	3:27
3.	"Sorrow Is a Woman"	Clark; Elliott; Savage; Pete Willis	3:54
4.	"It Could Be You"	Elliott; Willis	2:33
5.	"Satellite"	Clark; Elliott; Savage; Willis	4:28
6.	"When the Walls Came Tumbling Down"	Clark; Elliott; Andrew Smith	4:44
7.	"Wasted"	Clark; Elliott	3:45
8.	"Rocks Off"	Clark; Elliott; Savage; Willis	3:42
9.	"It Don't Matter"	Clark; Elliott; Willis	3:21
10.	"Answer to the Master"	Clark; Elliott; Savage; Willis	3:13
11.	"Overture"	Clark; Elliott; Savage; Willis	7:44

High 'n' Dry (disc two)
No.	Title	Writer(s)	Length
1.	"Let It Go"	Clark; Elliott; Willis	4:43
2.	"Another Hit and Run"	Elliott; Savage	4:58
3.	"High 'n' Dry (Saturday Night)"	Clark; Elliott; Savage	3:26
4.	"Bringin' On the Heartbreak"	Clark; Elliott; Willis	4:33
5.	"Switch 625"	Clark	3:03
6.	"You Got Me Runnin'"	Clark; Elliott; Willis	4:23
7.	"Lady Strange"	Rick Allen; Clark; Elliott; Willis	4:38
8.	"On Through the Night"	Clark; Elliott; Savage	5:06
9.	"Mirror, Mirror (Look into My Eyes)"	Clark; Elliott	4:07
10.	"No No No"	Elliott; Savage; Willis	3:13

When the Walls Came Tumbling Down – Live in Oxford 26/04/1980 (disc three)
No.	Title	Writer(s)	Length
1.	"When the Walls Came Tumbling Down"	Clark; Elliott; Smith	4:45
2.	"It Could Be You"	Elliott; Willis	2:38
3.	"Rock Brigade"	Clark; Elliott; Savage	2:25
4.	"Satellite"	Clark; Elliott; Savage; Willis	4:00
5.	"Medicine Man"	Clark; Elliott; Savage	4:08
6.	"Answer to the Master"	Clark; Elliott; Savage; Willis	3:25
7.	"When the Rain Falls"	Clark; Elliott; Willis	5:38
8.	"Sorrow Is a Woman"	Clark; Elliott; Savage; Willis	3:43
9.	"Good Morning Freedom"	Clark; Elliott; Savage; Willis	3:48
10.	"It Don't Matter"	Clark; Elliott; Willis	4:48
11.	"Overture"	Clark; Elliott; Savage; Willis	7:15
12.	"Lady Strange"	Allen; Clark; Elliott; Willis	4:54
13.	"Getcha Rocks Off"	Clark; Elliott; Savage; Willis	4:37
14.	"Hello America"	Clark; Elliott; Savage	3:14
15.	"Wasted"	Clark; Elliott	4:53
16.	"Ride Into the Sun"	Elliott; Savage	3:23

Too Many Jitterbugs – B-Sides and Rarities (disc four)
No.	Title	Writer(s)	Length
1.	"Ride Into the Sun" (EP version)	Elliott; Savage	2:52
2.	"Getcha Rocks Off" (EP version)	Clark; Elliott; Savage; Willis	3:40
3.	"The Overture" (EP version)	Clark; Elliott; Savage; Willis	7:46
4.	"Wasted" (early version)	Clark; Elliott	3:03
5.	"Hello America" (early version)	Clark; Elliott; Savage	3:07
6.	"Rock Brigade" (early version)	Clark; Elliott; Savage	2:48
7.	"Glad I'm Alive" (outtake)	Elliott; Willis	4:12
8.	"Good Morning Freedom" (outtake)	Clark; Elliott; Savage; Willis	2:59
9.	"Let It Go" (single edit)	Clark; Elliott; Willis	4:13
10.	"Switch 625" (single edit)	Clark	3:03
11.	"Bringin' On the Heartbreak" (single edit)	Clark; Elliott; Willis	3:57
12.	"Me and My Wine" (outtake)	Clark; Elliott; Savage	3:35
13.	"Bringin' On the Heartbreak" (remix)	Clark; Elliott; Willis	4:33
14.	"Me and My Wine" (remix)	Clark; Elliott; Savage	3:40

Raw – Early BBC Recordings (disc five)
No.	Title	Writer(s)	Length
1.	"Glad I'm Alive" (Andy Peebles session, 1979)	Elliott; Willis	4:29
2.	"Sorrow Is a Woman" (Andy Peebles session, 1979)	Clark; Elliott; Savage; Willis	3:48
3.	"Wasted" (Andy Peebles session, 1979)	Clark; Elliott	3:46
4.	"Answer to the Master" (Andy Peebles session, 1979)	Clark; Elliott; Savage; Willis	3:31
5.	"Satellite" (Friday Rock Show session, 1979)	Clark; Elliott; Savage; Willis	4:18
6.	"Rock Brigade" (Friday Rock Show session, 1979)	Clark; Elliott; Savage	2:42
7.	"Wasted" (Friday Rock Show session, 1979)	Clark; Elliott	2:59
8.	"Good Morning Freedom" (Friday Rock Show session, 1979)	Clark; Elliott; Savage; Willis	3:21
9.	"Satellite/When the Walls Came Tumbling Down" (live at the Reading Festival, 1980)	Clark; Elliott; Savage; Smith; Willis	6:11
10.	"Medicine Man" (live at the Reading Festival, 1980)	Clark; Elliott; Savage	4:11
11.	"The Overture" (live at the Reading Festival, 1980)	Clark; Elliott; Savage; Willis	7:28
12.	"Lady Strange" (live at the Reading Festival, 1980)	Allen; Clark; Elliott; Willis	4:59
13.	"Getcha Rocks Off" (live at the Reading Festival, 1980)	Clark; Elliott; Savage; Willis	5:16

== Personnel ==
- Joe Elliott – lead vocals
- Steve Clark – lead and rhythm guitars, backing vocals
- Pete Willis – lead and rhythm guitars, backing vocals
- Rick Savage – bass, backing vocals
- Rick Allen – drums
- Frank Noon – drums on 1979 EP tracks
