= Historia (video) =

Video by Def Leppard
- Released: 5 July 1988 (VHS/LD); 2001 (DVD)
- Recorded: 1980–1988
- Genre: Heavy Metal; hard rock; glam metal
- Length: 85 minutes
- Label: Universal

Def Leppard video chronology
Historia (1988)	Live: In the Round, in Your Face (1989)

Historia is a compilation video released by Def Leppard, containing all the band's promotional videos from 1980 to 1988. On DVD, it is bundled with the 1989 concert video Live: In the Round, in Your Face.

== Track listing ==
No.	Title	Writer(s)	From album	Length
1.	"Hello America"	Steve Clark; Joe Elliott; Rick Savage	On Through the Night (1980)
2.	"Let It Go"	Clark; Elliott; Pete Willis	High 'n' Dry (1981)
3.	"High 'n' Dry (Saturday Night)"	Clark; Elliott; Savage	High 'n' Dry
4.	"Bringin' On the Heartbreak" (with Pete Willis)	Clark; Elliott; Willis	High 'n' Dry
5.	"Photograph"	Clark; Elliott; Robert John "Mutt" Lange; Savage; Willis	Pyromania (1983)
6.	"Rock of Ages"	Clark; Elliott; Lange	Pyromania
7.	"Foolin'"	Clark; Elliott; Lange	Pyromania
8.	"Too Late for Love"	Clark; Elliott; Lange; Savage; Willis	Pyromania
9.	"Rock! Rock! (Till You Drop)"	Clark; Elliott; Lange; Savage	Pyromania
10.	"Bringin' On the Heartbreak" (with Phil Collen)	Clark; Elliott; Willis	High 'n' Dry
11.	"Me & My Wine"	Clark; Elliott; Willis	"Bringin' On the Heartbreak" single (1982/1984)
12.	"Women"	Clark; Phil Collen; Elliott; Lange; Savage	Hysteria (1987)
13.	"Animal"	Clark; Collen; Elliott; Lange; Savage	Hysteria
14.	"Pour Some Sugar on Me" (UK version)	Clark; Collen; Elliott; Lange; Savage	Hysteria
15.	"Hysteria"	Clark; Collen; Elliott; Lange; Savage	Hysteria
16.	"Armageddon It" (Live)	Clark; Collen; Elliott; Lange; Savage	Hysteria
17.	"Pour Some Sugar on Me" (U.S. version live)	Clark; Collen; Elliott; Lange; Savage	Hysteria
18.	"Love Bites" (unlisted on VHS release)	Clark; Collen; Elliott; Lange; Savage	Hysteria

- "Armageddon It" and "Pour Some Sugar on Me" (U.S. version) are listed as live versions, but the videos are of a live performances accompanied by the studio album music tracks.

== VHS ==
Published in the U.K., Northern Ireland, Ireland, and Australia in 1988 by Bludgeon Riffola Ltd./Warner Bros. Music Ltd and in the Rest of the World by Bludgeon Riffola Ltd./Zomba Music Publishers Ltd. Was distributed across the U.K. by Channel 5 Video, a part of Polygram Music Video company. The back cover photograph featuring the band, was taken was by Ross Halfin. Video sleeve art direction was by Andie Aifix for Satori, who is also referenced as designer for the cover of Metallica: 'The Videos 1989-2004' on DVD.

== DVD errors ==
The 2001 DVD release contains errors not present on the original VHS and Laserdisc releases. According to sources close to the band, there are no plans to fix the errors at this time:

- The video for "Bringin' On the Heartbreak (with Phil Collen)" contains a repeat of the audio from "Bringin' On the Heartbreak (with Pete Willis)" instead of the normal, remixed audio.
- During "Pour Some Sugar On Me (UK Version)" the audio originally contained demolition sounds such as glass breaking and walls crumbling while the house they were performing in was torn down around them. The audio for the U.S. version also originally contained audio clips of crowds cheering throughout most of the song. All those sounds have been removed from the DVD release.

== Certifications ==
Historia

Region	Certification	Certified units/sales
Australia (ARIA)	Platinum	15,000^{^}
Canada (Music Canada)	3× Platinum	30,000^{^}
United States (RIAA)	2× Platinum	200,000^{^}
^{^} Shipments figures based on certification alone.

Historia/In the Round In Your Face

Region	Certification	Certified units/sales
United States (RIAA)	Gold	50,000^{^}
^{^} Shipments figures based on certification alone.
