= Drastic Symphonies =

Remix album by Def Leppard with the Royal Philharmonic Orchestra
- Released: 19 May 2023
- Recorded: March 2022
- Studios: Abbey Road, London
- Genres: Symphonic rock, symphonic metal
- Length: 81:56
- Labels: Bludgeon Riffola; Mercury
- Producers: Nick Patrick; Ronan McHugh

Def Leppard chronology
Diamond Star Halos (2022)	Drastic Symphonies (2023)	One Night Only: Live at the Leadmill (2024)

Drastic Symphonies is a remix album by English rock band Def Leppard with the Royal Philharmonic Orchestra, released on 19 May 2023 through Bludgeon Riffola and Mercury Records. It was produced by Nick Patrick and Ronan McHugh, and contains 16 of the band's songs re-recorded with orchestral accompaniment from the Royal Philharmonic Orchestra and arrangements by Eric Gorfain, recorded at Abbey Road Studios in London in March 2022. Most tracks contain the vocals from the original recordings. The album contains at least one song from Def Leppard's previous studio albums with the exception of On Through the Night (1980), X (2002), Yeah! (2006), and Def Leppard (2015).

== Critical reception ==
Professional ratings
Review scores
Source	Rating
Classic Rock	4/5 stars

John Aizlewood of Classic Rock commented that Def Leppard "have gone down the orchestral route" but "done it properly, so it's the Royal Philharmonic Orchestra at Abbey Road, rather than some chancers in Joe's garage" and remarked that "the song selection is smart" and "one of the joys of the album is that it's not quite so predictable". Gary Graff of Ultimate Classic Rock wrote that "the results are unquestionably intriguing and fresh – a genuinely new way of approaching these tracks, even if you'd be hard-pressed to pick any that would become the preferred version", and called the "only outright dud" the stripped version of "Pour Some Sugar on Me" due to its lyrics "sound[ing] silly in such austere sonic trappings".

== Track listing ==
No.	Title	Writer(s)	Origin	Length
1.	"Turn to Dust"	Phil Collen	Slang, 1996	5:29
2.	"Paper Sun"	Vivian Campbell; Collen; Rick Savage; Pete Woodroffe	Euphoria, 1999	5:33
3.	"Animal"	Steve Clark; Collen; Joe Elliott; Robert John "Mutt" Lange; Savage	Hysteria, 1987	4:03
4.	"Pour Some Sugar on Me" (stripped version)	Clark; Collen; Elliott; Lange; Savage	Hysteria	5:26
5.	"Hysteria"	Clark; Collen; Elliott; Lange; Savage	Hysteria	5:56
6.	"Love Bites"	Clark; Collen; Elliott; Lange; Savage	Hysteria	6:41
7.	"Goodbye for Good This Time"	Elliott	Diamond Star Halos, 2022	4:26
8.	"Love"	Savage	Songs from the Sparkle Lounge, 2008	3:55
9.	"Gods of War"	Clark; Collen; Elliott; Lange; Savage	Hysteria	6:45
10.	"Angels (Can't Help You Now)"	Elliott	Diamond Star Halos	4:58
11.	"Bringin' On the Heartbreak"	Clark; Elliott; Pete Willis	High 'n' Dry, 1981	4:33
12.	"Switch 625"	Clark	High 'n' Dry	3:04
13.	"Have You Ever Needed Someone So Bad" (Japanese SHM-CD, Blu-ray Audio, vinyl and digital editions only)	Collen; Elliott; Lange	Adrenalize, 1992	4:55
14.	"Too Late for Love"	Clark; Elliott; Lange; Savage; Willis	Pyromania, 1983	5:37
15.	"When Love & Hate Collide"	Elliott; Savage	Vault: Def Leppard Greatest Hits (1980–1995), 1995	4:16
16.	"Kings of the World"	Savage	Mirror Ball – Live & More, 2011	6:19
Total length:				81:56

== Charts ==
Chart performance for Drastic Symphonies
Chart (2023)	Peak position
Australian Albums (ARIA)	46
Austrian Albums (Ö3 Austria)	42
Belgian Albums (Ultratop Flanders)	119
Belgian Albums (Ultratop Wallonia)	86
French Albums (SNEP)	129
German Albums (Offizielle Top 100)	17
Irish Albums (IRMA)	95
Japanese Albums (Oricon)	18
Japanese Hot Albums (Billboard Japan)	22
Scottish Albums (Official Charts)	2
Spanish Albums (Promusicae)	86
Swiss Albums (Schweizer Hitparade)	10
UK Albums (Official Charts)	4
UK Rock & Metal Albums (Official Charts)	1
US Billboard 200	54
US Top Hard Rock Albums (Billboard)	4
US Top Rock Albums (Billboard)	9
