= And There Will Be a Next Time... Live from Detroit =

Live album by Def Leppard
- Released: 10 February 2017
- Recorded: 15 July 2016
- Venue: DTE Energy Music Theatre
- Genre: Rock
- Length: 112:00
- Label: Eagle Rock Entertainment

Def Leppard chronology
Def Leppard (2015)	And There Will Be a Next Time... Live from Detroit (2017)	The Story So Far – The Best Of (2018)

And There Will Be a Next Time... Live from Detroit is the third live album and third live release from the band Def Leppard. Released in 2017, it was recorded at the DTE Energy Music Theatre near Clarkston, Michigan on 15 July 2016.

== Concept ==
Joe Elliott of Def Leppard said on their website, “I had this idea that we should film one of the shows from the 2016 tour because apart from the ‘Viva! Hysteria’ shows, we hadn’t actually had a live performance filmed since 1988. With a new album out that was being so well received, it was just a case of where to do it. From the second the house lights went down, we could see the sun setting from the stage, and the energy from the crowd just seemed to intensify. It was a good choice and a great way to document Def Leppard in 2016.”

== Reviews and reception ==
Professional ratings
Review scores
Source	Rating
Classic Rock Revisited	B

Jeb Wright of Classic Rock Revisited (gives letter ratings from "A", or must own to "F", or puke) gave the album a "B" rating saying "Joe Elliot is a fine front man and he handles the lead vocals capably, while Phil Collen, Rick Savage and Viv Campbell cover the high notes extremely well (with or without any added technology). Instrumentally, the band performs proficiently and is amazing to watch. At the end of the day, this is a perfect representation of a band that still kicks butt live. They have the look, the songs, the enthusiastic crowd, the showmanship and the cool ass video and light presentation to keep going on for as long as they want."

Dave Campbell of Metal Temple gave a positive review, saying "Seeing the set as a whole really reminded me of how great they are live, and that I need to get out and see them again and soon. Few bands have managed to stay relevant this far into their career, and produce a live show so full of fun and sincerity."

Andy Lye of Jukebox:Metal was unimpressed with the lead vocals, saying "[Elliot] still hasn't adjusted his approach to older songs according to his current abilities, and therefore again cracks badly when he pushes himself too hard. When he doesn't, he sounds great (never more so than on groover Man Enough, the stand-out track from the new album), but in those moments when he does, it has the potential to ruin songs completely (e.g. Rocket), and this was entirely avoidable – even by something as simple as turning up the backing vocals to masque it."

== Track listing ==
CD disc one
No.	Title	Writer(s)	Origin	Length
1.	"Let's Go"	Joe Elliott; Rick Savage	Def Leppard, 2015	5:01
2.	"Animal"	Elliott; Savage; Phil Collen; Steve Clark; Mutt Lange	Hysteria, 1987	4:05
3.	"Let It Go"	Elliott; Clark; Pete Willis	High 'n' Dry, 1981	4:44
4.	"Dangerous"	Elliott; Collen	Def Leppard	3:26
5.	"Foolin'"	Elliott; Clark; Lange	Pyromania, 1983	4:35
6.	"Love Bites"	Elliott; Savage; Collen; Clark; Lange	Hysteria	5:50
7.	"Armageddon It"	Elliott; Savage; Collen; Clark; Lange	Hysteria	5:24
8.	"Rock On"	David Essex	Yeah!, 2006	3:48
9.	"Man Enough"	Elliott; Collen	Def Leppard	3:54

CD disc two
No.	Title	Writer(s)	Origin	Length
1.	"Rocket"	Elliott; Savage; Collen; Clark; Lange	Hysteria	4:09
2.	"Bringin' On the Heartbreak"	Elliott; Clark; Willis	High 'n' Dry	4:33
3.	"Switch 625"	Clark	High 'n' Dry	3:04
4.	"Hysteria"	Elliott; Savage; Collen; Clark; Lange	Hysteria	5:56
5.	"Let's Get Rocked"	Elliott; Savage; Collen; Lange	Adrenalize, 1992	4:57
6.	"Pour Some Sugar on Me"	Elliott; Savage; Collen; Clark; Lange	Hysteria	4:53
7.	"Rock of Ages"	Elliott; Clark; Lange	Pyromania	4:07
8.	"Photograph"	Elliott; Savage; Clark; Lange; Willis	Pyromania	4:07

The DVD/Blu-ray disc includes all the tracks above in video form, plus the official music videos for “Let’s Go”, “Dangerous”, and “Man Enough”, and the lyric video for “Let’s Go”.

== Personnel ==
Def Leppard

- Joe Elliott – lead vocals
- Phil Collen – guitars, backing vocals
- Vivian Campbell – guitars, backing vocals
- Rick Savage – bass guitar, backing vocals
- Rick Allen – drums
