= Live: In the Round, in Your Face =

Video by Def Leppard
- Released: 7 March 1989 (VHS); 2001 (DVD)
- Recorded: 12 & 13 February 1988
- Venue: McNichols Sports Arena, Denver, Colorado; The Omni, Atlanta, Georgia
- Genre: Glam metal; hard rock
- Length: 90 minutes approx.
- Label: Universal

Def Leppard video chronology
Historia (1988)	Live: In the Round, in Your Face (1989)	Visualize (1993)

Live: In the Round, in Your Face is a live video from Def Leppard. The video contains a full Def Leppard live show at the McNichols Sports Arena in Denver, Colorado and additional footage from shows at The Omni in Atlanta, Georgia, compiled from footage shot during the band's 1987/1988 US Hysteria World Tour. On DVD, it is bundled with Historia.

== Track listing ==
All tracks are written by Steve Clark, Phil Collen, Joe Elliott, Robert John "Mutt" Lange, and Rick Savage, except where noted.

No.	Title	Writer(s)	Length
1.	"Rocket Intro / "Do I Feel Lucky?"" (from the film Dirty Harry)
2.	"Stagefright"	Elliott; Lange; Savage
3.	"Rock! Rock! (Till You Drop)"	Clark; Elliott; Lange; Savage
4.	"Women"
5.	"Too Late for Love"	Clark; Elliott; Lange; Savage; Pete Willis
6.	"Hysteria"
7.	"Gods of War"
8.	"Die Hard the Hunter"	Clark; Elliott; Lange; Savage
9.	"Bringin' On the Heartbreak"	Clark; Elliott; Willis
10.	"Foolin'"	Clark; Elliott; Lange
11.	"Armageddon It"
12.	"Animal"
13.	"Pour Some Sugar on Me"
14.	"Rock of Ages"	Clark; Elliott; Lange
15.	"Photograph"	Clark; Elliott; Lange; Savage; Willis

The instrumental played during the opening montage of the audience entering the arena while the band warms up backstage is an edit of the "Lunar Mix" of "Rocket" (found on the 2006 "Deluxe Edition" of Hysteria) while the instrumental "Switch 625" is played over the credits, along with backstage clips of the band.

The songs "Don't Shoot Shotgun", "Let It Go", "Tear It Down" and "Travelin' Band" were performed and recorded but did not make the VHS or DVD. Also, "Armageddon It" and "Pour Some Sugar on Me" were actually performed and recorded twice for their respective music videos but neither of the first performances of those songs on that night were shown on the home media released. They can be found on a bootleg with the rest of the unmixed soundboard recording and the sound check.

== Personnel ==
- Joe Elliott – lead vocals, rhythm guitar on "Hysteria," keyboards on "Gods of War"
- Rick Savage – bass, backing vocals, keyboards (4–5, 14), acoustic guitar on "Gods of War"
- Rick Allen – drums, backing vocals, spoken intro on "Rock of Ages"
- Phil Collen – guitar (lead guitar on 2–4, 6, 10–15; acoustic guitar on "Bringin' On the Heartbreak"), backing vocals
- Steve Clark – guitar (lead guitar on 5–9, 11, 13–15; Gibson EDS-1275 on 8–10), backing vocals

== Certifications ==
In the Round In Your Face Live

Region	Certification	Certified units/sales
Australia (ARIA)	Gold	7,500^{^}
Canada (Music Canada)	Platinum	10,000^{^}
United States (RIAA)	2× Platinum	200,000^{^}
^{^} Shipments figures based on certification alone.

Historia/In the Round In Your Face

Region	Certification	Certified units/sales
United States (RIAA)	Gold	50,000^{^}
^{^} Shipments figures based on certification alone.
