= List of awards and nominations received by Def Leppard =

Def Leppard awards and nominations
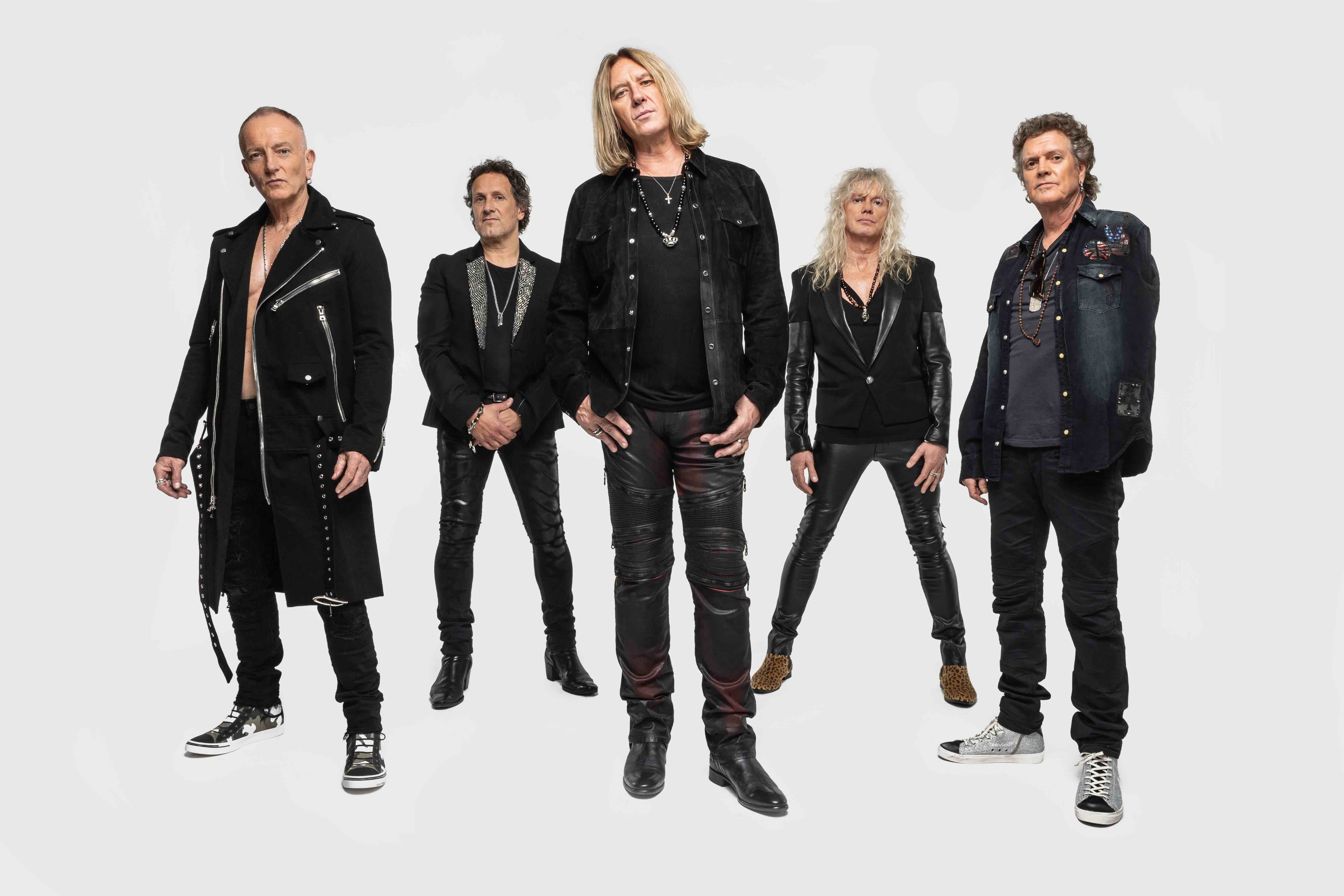
- Def Leppard band members in 2018
Awards and nominations
Award	Wins	Nominations
American Music Awards	2	7
MTV Video Music Awards	0	6

Totals (Note: Certain award groups do not simply award one winner. They acknowledge several different recipients, have runners-up, and have third place. Since this is a specific recognition and is different from losing an award, runner-up mentions are considered wins in this award tally. For simplification and to avoid errors, each award in this list has been presumed to have had a prior nomination.)
- Wins: 2
- Nominations: 13

This is a list of awards and nominations received by the English rock band Def Leppard, which formed in 1977 as part of the new wave of British heavy metal movement.

== American Music Awards ==
The American Music Awards is an annual awards ceremony created by Dick Clark in 1973. Def Leppard has been nominated seven times overall due to the band's large popularity in the United States.

Year	Nominee / work	Award	Result
1984	Def Leppard	Favorite Pop/Rock Band/Duo/Group	Nominated
1984	Pyromania	Favorite Pop/Rock Album	Nominated
1989	Def Leppard	Favorite Pop/Rock Band/Duo/Group	Nominated
1989	Hysteria	Favorite Pop/Rock Album	Nominated
1989	Def Leppard	Favorite Heavy Metal/Hard Rock Artist	Won
1989	Hysteria	Favorite Heavy Metal/Hard Rock Album	Won
1993	Def Leppard	Favorite Heavy Metal/Hard Rock Artist	Nominated

== Classic Rock Roll of Honour Awards ==
Year	Nominee / work	Award	Result	Ref.
2006	Hysteria	Classic Album	Won	
2016	Def Leppard	Album of the Year	Won	

== CMT Music Awards ==
The CMT Music Awards is an awards show for country music videos. Def Leppard had 2 nominations in 2009 for a collaboration with Taylor Swift.

Year	Nominee / work	Award	Result
2009	"Photograph" (with Taylor Swift)	Wide Open Country Video of the Year	Nominated
2009	"Photograph" (with Taylor Swift)	CMT Performance of the Year	Nominated

== Metal Hammer Golden Gods Awards ==
Year	Nominee / work	Award	Result	Ref.
2009	Def Leppard	Legends Award	Won	

== MTV Video Music Awards ==
The MTV Video Music Awards is an annual awards ceremony established in 1984 by MTV. have Def Leppard received six nomination overall.

Year	Nominee / work	Award	Result
1989	"Pour Some Sugar On Me"	Best Heavy Metal Video	Nominated
1989	"Pour Some Sugar On Me"	Best Stage Performance in a Video	Nominated
1992	"Let's Get Rocked"	Viewer's Choice	Nominated
1992	"Let's Get Rocked"	Best Metal/Hard Rock Video	Nominated
1992	"Let's Get Rocked"	Best Special Effects	Nominated
1992	"Let's Get Rocked"	Video of the Year	Nominated

== Planet Rock Awards ==
Year	Nominee / work	Award	Result	Ref.
2017	Def Leppard	The Brick Wall Award	Won	

== Rock and Roll Hall of Fame ==
The Rock and Roll Hall of Fame honors artists, producers, engineers, and other notable figures who have influenced the development of rock music. They were inducted into the 2019 Performer Category alongside The Cure, Janet Jackson, Stevie Nicks, Radiohead, Roxy Music and the Zombies on March 29, 2019.

Year	Nominee / work	Award	Result	Ref.
2019	Def Leppard	Rock and Roll Hall of Fame	Inducted	
