= Diamond Star Halos =

Studio album by Def Leppard
- Released: 27 May 2022
- Studios: Joe's Garage (Dublin); Phil's Sweat Shop (Los Angeles); Sav's Base; Viv's Guitar Shed
- Genre: Glam rock
- Length: 61:27
- Labels: Bludgeon Riffola; Mercury
- Producers: Def Leppard; Ronan McHugh

Def Leppard chronology
The Early Years 79–81 (2020)	Diamond Star Halos (2022)	Drastic Symphonies (2023)

Def Leppard studio albums chronology
Def Leppard (2015)	Diamond Star Halos (2022)

Singles from Diamond Star Halos
- 1. "Kick" Released: 17 March 2022; 2. "Take What You Want" Released: 20 April 2022; 3. "Fire It Up" Released: 20 May 2022

Diamond Star Halos is the twelfth studio album by the English rock band Def Leppard. It was released on 27 May 2022 through Bludgeon Riffola and Mercury Records, and is the band's first studio album in nearly seven years since 2015's Def Leppard. The album takes its name from the 1971 T. Rex single "Get It On" and includes imagery from Anton Corbijn, Maryam Malakpour, and Oliver and Joshua Munden.

== Critical reception ==
Professional ratings
Review scores
Source	Rating
AllMusic	3.5/5 stars
The Arts Desk	3/5 stars
Blabbermouth.net	7/10
Louder Sound	4/5 stars
The Daily Telegraph	4/5 stars

Ultimate Classic Rock's Michael Gallucci called the album "most obvious callback to glam's glory days as well as their own past triumphs", claiming that the band have learned to not "mess with what works" unlike past projects Slang and X. Having noted influences of glam rock stars David Bowie, Mott the Hoople and T. Rex, Gallucci also wrote that while, "like most tribute albums, the take-and-give results on Diamond Star Halos don't always match what was heard the first time around", "the band hasn't sounded this invigorated on record since the early '90s." The Arts Desk's Joe Muggs wrote that "this album starts and ends so brilliantly", starting with "a salvo of three tracks that remind you exactly why Def Leppard became one of the biggest bands in the world in the mid Eighties" and ending with "heavily Queen-indebted high drama closer 'From Here to Eternity'", a "grand way to close a record", contrasting with a middle section that is "way too generic, slightly countrified and very American soft rock" and "can't really live up" to "these great bookends".

Blabbermouth.net's Dom Lawson explains the band's appeal as being because they "have never stopped behaving like the wide-eyed, priapic teenagers they were when they penned 'Hello America' all those years ago" rather than "resting on their laurels, touring the world on an endless nostalgia trip and never again making a new album", and that while the band are "relaxed" and the album "low on shiny bells and high-tech whistles", "it compensates by being (mainly) full of simple, heartfelt and punchy songs" and "is a very good time had by all." Louder Sound's Neil Jeffries called "SOS Emergency", "All We Need", "Open Your Eyes", "Gimme a Kiss", and "Unbreakable" "especially strong" and "stadium pleasers in the grand Leppard tradition"; and the album "best appreciated as a double album: three sides, each begun by three rockers and ending with a change of pace, then a shorter fourth side that abandons the pattern and goes out on the high of [Rick] Savage's 'From Here to Eternity', an epic track with a swinging, Pink Floyd-like tempo." The Telegraph's James Hall also emphasised the album's "[not messing] with the formula" in comparison to Slang, save for the "fascinating curveballs" brought in the form of the Alison Krauss-featuring "This Guitar" and "Lifeless", the former of which Hall called the better of the two and "a subtle (by Def Leppard standards) ballad that could well turn out to be a smash in the Nashville country charts." AllMusic's Stephen Thomas Erlewine wrote that "Leppard crank up the hooks, melodies, and amplifiers, adding little bits of distinctive flair along the way", noting that "its individual moments may not be excessive" but "the cumulative effect is almost overwhelming, especially as Def Leppard gives it their all in each cut."

Ultimate Classic Rock placed Diamond Star Halos at 13th of their top 30 best rock albums of 2022.

== Track listing ==
Standard edition
No.	Title	Writer(s)	Length
1.	"Take What You Want"	Joe Elliott; Rick Savage	4:14
2.	"Kick"	Dave Bassett; Phil Collen	3:42
3.	"Fire It Up"	Collen; Sam Hollander	3:19
4.	"This Guitar" (featuring Alison Krauss)	C. J. Vanston; Collen	3:50
5.	"SOS Emergency"	Elliott; Collen	3:25
6.	"Liquid Dust"	Collen	4:01
7.	"U Rok Mi"	Collen	3:33
8.	"Goodbye for Good This Time"	Elliott	4:27
9.	"All We Need"	Elliott; Collen	4:46
10.	"Open Your Eyes"	Elliott; Collen	4:19
11.	"Gimme a Kiss" (Called "Gimme a Kiss That Rocks" on the CD version)	Elliott; Collen	3:12
12.	"Angels (Can't Help You Now)"	Elliott	4:57
13.	"Lifeless" (featuring Alison Krauss)	Elliott; Collen	4:19
14.	"Unbreakable"	Elliott	3:46
15.	"From Here to Eternity"	Savage	5:37
Total length:			61:27

Deluxe edition
No.	Title	Writer(s)	Length
16.	"Goodbye for Good This Time" (Avant-Garde Mix)	Elliott	4.34
17.	"Lifeless" (Joe Only Version)	Elliott; Collen	4.21
Total length:			70:22

Japanese standard edition
No.	Title	Writer(s)	Length
16.	"Angels (Can't Help You Now)" (Stripped Version)	Elliott	4.57
17.	"This Guitar" (Joe Only Version)	Vanston; Collen	3.50
Total length:			70:14

== Personnel ==
=== Def Leppard ===
- Joe Elliott – lead vocals, guitars (8, 12, 14)
- Phil Collen – guitars (1–7, 9–15), backing vocals (1)
- Vivian Campbell – guitars, backing vocals (1)
- Rick Savage – bass, guitars (1–3, 15), backing vocals (1)
- Rick Allen – drums

=== Additional musicians ===
- Alison Krauss – lead vocals (4, 13)
- Debbi Blackwell-Cook – backing vocals (2, 3, 11, 12)
- Dave Bassett – backing vocals (2, 3)
- Mike Garson – piano (8, 12)
- Eric Gorfain – string arrangements (4, 8, 12)
- Ronan McHugh – drum programming

=== Technical ===
- Ronan McHugh – production, editing, engineering, mixing
- Ross Hogarth – recording engineer (4, 8, 12)
- Def Leppard – additional engineering
- Joe LaPorta – mastering

== Charts ==
Chart performance for Diamond Star Halos
Chart (2022)	Peak position
Australian Albums (ARIA)	3
Austrian Albums (Ö3 Austria)	10
Belgian Albums (Ultratop Flanders)	30
Belgian Albums (Ultratop Wallonia)	17
Canadian Albums (Billboard)	16
Czech Albums (ČNS IFPI)	45
Dutch Albums (Album Top 100)	61
Finnish Albums (Suomen virallinen lista)	8
French Albums (SNEP)	27
German Albums (Offizielle Top 100)	8
Hungarian Albums (MAHASZ)	18
Irish Albums (IRMA)	25
Italian Albums (FIMI)	86
Japanese Albums (Oricon)	16
Japanese Hot Albums (Billboard Japan)	19
New Zealand Albums (RMNZ)	21
Norwegian Albums (VG-lista)	22
Polish Albums (ZPAV)	12
Portuguese Albums (AFP)	26
Scottish Albums (Official Charts)	3
Spanish Albums (Promusicae)	16
Swedish Albums (Sverigetopplistan)	14
Swiss Albums (Schweizer Hitparade)	4
UK Albums (Official Charts)	5
UK Rock & Metal Albums (Official Charts)	1
US Billboard 200	10
US Top Rock Albums (Billboard)	2
