= The Def Leppard E.P. =

EP by Def Leppard
- Released: January 1979
- Recorded: November 1978
- Studios: Fairview (Hull, England)
- Genre: Heavy metal
- Length: 14:37
- Label: Bludgeon-Riffola
- Producer: Def Leppard

Def Leppard chronology
The Def Leppard E.P. (1979)	On Through the Night (1980)

Professional ratings
Review scores
Source	Rating
AllMusic	3/5 stars

The Def Leppard E.P. is the debut EP by English rock band Def Leppard. The EP was recorded at Fairview Studios in Hull, in November 1978 and self-produced by the band. The EP's cover is a parody of the painting His Master's Voice, with a leopard in place of the painting's dog, Nipper. The record was first released with the code SRT CUS 232 and a red label by the band's own company Bludgeon-Riffola.

== Background ==
One hundred copies included lyric sheet inserts that vocalist Joe Elliott had photocopied during his lunch-break at work. Additionally, he and his mother glued the 1,000 sleeves together. The double-sided insert has the lyrics to "Ride into the Sun" and "Getcha Rocks Off" on one side. Lyrics for "The Overture" are on the other side along with individual sketches of the band members by Dave Jeffrey. A credit for the band's "Mixer Man Mr. Nick Cartwright" was also included because his name was erroneously left off the credits on the picture sleeve rear cover.

Without Tony Kenning, the band needed a drummer for the session, so Frank Noon was borrowed from The Next Band for the weekend. According to Elliott, the EP cost £148.50 to record (equivalent to £700 in 2025), money which he had borrowed from his father. This provided an initial print run of 1,000 copies that the band would use in a concerted effort to get noticed.

Released in January 1979, the single was sold for £1 (equivalent to £4.92 in 2025) at shows and was handed out to anyone who could help gain the band exposure. Elliott jumped on stage at Sheffield University during a John Peel DJ session to hand-deliver a copy of the EP. Peel obliged by playing the single on his BBC Radio 1 show and the single eventually made it to No. 84 on the BBC singles charts. As a result, the mission was a success and the band started generating press.

Helped by radio play, the initial pressing was sold out by the summer of 1979, so the band's first managers had the EP reissued with a yellow label and no picture sleeve. Once signed to Phonogram, the single was issued again, with "Ride into the Sun" and "Getcha Rocks Off" being swapped around because the latter had become more popular. The EP was re-issued yet again in the late 1980s to Def Leppard fan club members with the picture sleeve intact, the tracks put back in their original order, and a white label replacing the yellow label. This "White Label" release is the most common release seen on auction sites such as eBay and also the least valuable, but still can be worth over $20.

"The Overture" was re-recorded for Def Leppard's first LP, as was "Getcha Rocks Off", retitled as "Rocks Off", which also received a fake audience track in the background of the recording. "Ride into the Sun" was shelved until a new version was recorded in 1987 as a B-side to the "Hysteria" single. The rerecorded version later appeared on Retro Active, but it has additional overdubs and replaces the opening drum solo with a piano intro performed by Ian Hunter. The rerecorded version is credited to Elliott, Phil Collen, Steve Clark and Savage while the version on The Def Leppard E.P. is credited to Elliott and Savage.

In 2017, the EP was released on 12-inch vinyl for Record Store Day and as a digital download for the first time. The following year it was released as a mini CD included with the "CD Collection Volume One" box set. Additionally, all three tracks on the EP were remastered and included on the 2020 box set The Early Years 79–81.

== Track listing ==
=== Original release ===
This is a 1,000 copy release with a red label on the disc.

Side one
No.	Title	Writer(s)	Length
1.	"Ride into the Sun"	Rick Savage; Joe Elliott	2:52
2.	"Getcha Rocks Off"	Savage; Elliott; Pete Willis; Steve Clark	3:39

Side two
No.	Title	Writer(s)	Length
1.	"The Overture"	Savage; Elliott; Willis; Clark	7:46

=== Vertigo version ===
The EP was re-released by Vertigo Records in September 1979 and flipped the first two tracks from the original release.

Side one
No.	Title	Writer(s)	Length
1.	"Getcha Rocks Off"	Savage; Elliott; Willis; Clark	3:39
2.	"Ride into the Sun"	Savage; Elliott	2:52

Side two
No.	Title	Writer(s)	Length
1.	"The Overture"	Savage; Elliott; Willis; Clark	7:46

== Credits ==
=== Def Leppard ===
- Joe Elliott – lead vocals, production
- Pete Willis – guitar (solo on "Ride into the Sun", third solo on "Overture"), production
- Steve Clark – guitar (solo on "Getcha Rocks Off", first and second solos on "Overture"), production
- Rick Savage – bass, backing vocals, production

=== Additional personnel ===
- Frank Noon – drums

=== Technical personnel ===
- Keith Herd, Roy Neave – engineering
- Nick Cartwright – mixing
- Dave Jeffery – artwork
- John Wood – photography
