= Wasted (Def Leppard song) =

Single by Def Leppard

from the album On Through the Night
- Released: 2 November 1979
- Recorded: September 1979
- Genre: Heavy metal; hard rock
- Length: 3:45
- Label: Mercury
- Songwriters: Joe Elliot; Steve Clark
- Producers: Nick Tauber; Def Leppard

Def Leppard singles chronology
"Rocks Off" (1979)	"Wasted" (1979)	"Hello America" (1980)

"Wasted" is a song by English rock band Def Leppard. It was released as a single before the band recorded their debut album, On Through the Night.

== Overview ==
The recording featured on the single is a different version from the On Through the Night LP. The B-Side on the single is "Hello America", which is also a different recording from the LP. These alternative, single-only versions of "Wasted" and "Hello America" had never been released on CD, until 2018 when they were included as part of The Collection: Volume One box set, as the first two tracks of the Rarities: Volume One disc. The record was produced by Nick Tauber, who the band selected because of his previous clients, particularly Thin Lizzy. Two other songs, "Rock Brigade" (also re-recorded for On Through the Night) and "Glad I'm Alive", were recorded during the session but were shelved when the band's management were displeased with the production, thus resulting in the "Wasted" b/w "Hello America" 7" single rather than the planned 4-song EP. A re-recording of "Hello America" subsequently became the band's first single heralding the arrival of On Through the Night.

Unused promotional videos for "Wasted" and "Rock Brigade", filmed in London in the fall of 1979, surfaced on YouTube in 2009 when they were uploaded by the director of the clips. This was the first time the Tauber version of "Rock Brigade" appeared anywhere, which left "Glad I'm Alive" as the only song from those sessions to remain hidden. All four songs, however, are included in the box set The Early Years 79–81 which was released on 20 March 2020.

Although Def Leppard has all but disowned On Through the Night, "Wasted" has nonetheless been played live occasionally on some recent tours (since 1999) to the present – being the only song from that album apart from six performances of "Rock Brigade" in 2005 and 2013 to be performed since the completion of the Pyromania tour.

== Track listing ==
UK 7" single

1. "Wasted"
2. "Hello America"

== Charts ==
Chart (1979)	Peak position
UK Singles (Official Charts)	61
