= Too Late for Love (Def Leppard song) =

Single by Def Leppard

from the album Pyromania
- Released: 25 November 1983
- Recorded: 1982
- Studio: Park Gates (Battle, East Sussex); Battery (London)
- Length: 4:30
- Label: Mercury
- Songwriters: Joe Elliott; Pete Willis; Steve Clark; Rick Savage; Robert John "Mutt" Lange
- Producer: Robert John "Mutt" Lange

Def Leppard singles chronology
"Foolin'" (1983)	"Too Late for Love" (1983)	"Bringin' On the Heartbreak" (remix) (1984)

Music video
- "Too Late for Love" on YouTube

"Too Late for Love" is a 1983 power ballad by English band Def Leppard from their album Pyromania. When released as a single, it peaked at number 9 on the Mainstream Rock charts.

== Track listing ==
1. "Too Late for Love"
2. "Foolin'"
3. "High 'n' Dry (Saturday Night)"

== Personnel ==
- Joe Elliott – lead vocals
- Phil Collen – additional rhythm guitar, backing vocals
- Steve Clark – lead guitar
- Pete Willis – rhythm guitar
- Rick Savage – bass guitar, backing vocals
- Rick Allen – drums

== Charts ==
Chart (1983–1984)	Peak position
UK Singles (OCC)	86
US Mainstream Rock (Billboard)	9
