= Hello America (song) =

Single by Def Leppard

from the album On Through the Night
- B-side: "Good Morning Freedom"
- Released: 8 February 1980
- Recorded: December 1979
- Studio: Startling (Ascot, Berkshire)
- Genre: Heavy metal; hard rock
- Length: 3:27
- Label: Mercury
- Songwriters: Joe Elliott; Steve Clark; Rick Savage
- Producer: Tom Allom

Def Leppard singles chronology
"Wasted" (1980)	"Hello America" (1980)	"Rock Brigade" (1980)

"Hello America" is a 1980 song by the English rock band Def Leppard from their debut album, On Through the Night. The lyrics and title of the song are about the fantasies the band had about touring in America.

== Background ==
The single's B-side, "Good Morning Freedom" has only been released on CD in 2018 on the Rarities: Volume One CD which was part of the Collection Part One box set. The song was featured on a BBC studio session recorded in 1979 and the show has since been bootlegged. A live version of the song is also included on Viva! Hysteria, released in October 2013, although Def Leppard have all but disowned On Through the Night and "Hello America" was one of the first songs to leave the setlist, having never been played live since the release of High 'n' Dry.

An alternate recording of the song "Hello America" appeared as a B-side on the "Wasted" single, also an alternate recording. Both were recorded a few months earlier than the main album sessions.

== Video ==
When the song was within the Top 50 in the UK Singles Chart, Mercury Records had the band record a performance for BBC's Top of the Pops, provided that the song advanced the following week. However, the song slipped off the charts, and the video never aired. It is, however, included in the band's video Historia. What makes this video unique is that Rick Allen's drum kit is placed in the front of the stage, while the rest of the band performs behind him. Joe Elliott is wearing a patriotic outfit because of the red and white striped shirt and his blue jeans.

== Track listing ==
=== 7": Vertigo – Phonogram / LEPP1 (UK) ===
1. "Hello America"
2. "Good Morning Freedom"

== Personnel ==
=== Def Leppard ===
- Joe Elliott – lead vocals
- Steve Clark – lead guitar
- Pete Willis – rhythm guitar
- Rick Savage – bass guitar, backing vocals
- Rick Allen – drums

=== Additional personnel ===
- Chris M. Hughes – synthesizer

== Charts ==
Chart (1980)	Peak position
UK Singles (Official Charts)	45
