= On Through the Night =

Studio album by Def Leppard
- Released: 14 March 1980
- Recorded: December 1979
- Studio: Startling (Ascot, Berkshire)
- Genres: Heavy metal; hard rock
- Length: 43:47
- Label: Vertigo
- Producer: Tom Allom

Def Leppard chronology
The Def Leppard E.P. (1979)	On Through the Night (1980)	High 'n' Dry (1981)

Singles from On Through the Night
- 1. "Wasted" Released: 2 November 1979; 2. "Hello America" Released: 8 February 1980; 3. "Rock Brigade" Released: 14 May 1980 (US)

Audio
- "Album" playlist on YouTube

On Through the Night is the debut studio album by English rock band Def Leppard, released on 14 March 1980. The album was produced by Tom Allom. It charted at No. 15 on the UK Albums Chart and No. 51 on the Billboard 200. The album features re-recorded versions of "Rocks Off" and "Overture", tracks from the band's original independently released EP, The Def Leppard E.P.. Other tracks are re-recorded versions of early demos, some of which later appeared on the 2020 box set The Early Years 79–81. The album was certified gold by the RIAA on 18 November 1983 and platinum on 9 May 1989.

"Wasted", "Hello America" and "Rock Brigade" were released as singles. However, the version of "Wasted" that appears on the single is a different recording from that of the LP, as is its B-side, "Hello America".

The spoken word intro to "When the Walls Came Tumbling Down" was performed by Dave Cousins of Strawbs. Joe Elliott had done the spoken portion in earlier live performances and demo recordings that showed up on some early bootlegs. In his biography, Cousins claims that he did his best Laurence Olivier impersonation for the song's intro.

== Background ==
In November 1978, the band recorded the independently produced EP The Def Leppard E.P. with Frank Noon on drums, and Rick Allen joined the band that same month. Of the songs included on this album, "Rocks Off" and "Overture" are rerecorded versions of songs originally released on the aforementioned self-produced EP. In 1979, the band released their major-label debut single, "Wasted", produced by Nick Tauber.

Candidates for producer of the album included Chas Chandler and Roy Wood, but Tom Allom, who had worked on releases by bands including Judas Priest, was ultimately chosen. However, a version of "Rock Brigade" produced by Tauber also exists; it was unreleased at the time and was later included on the box set The Early Years 79–81. Before producing the album, Allom had seen the band perform when they served as the opening act for AC/DC, and later recalled, "They were captivating, youthful, vibrant and the playing was solid, so it was easy to get a good performance out of them".

"Hello America" was reportedly inspired by the palm-lined streets of Los Angeles seen in an American television drama (according to Joe Elliott, either Kojak or Starsky & Hutch). The spoken word at the beginning of "When the Walls Came Tumblin' Down" was performed by Elliott on live and demo recordings, but for this album it was performed by guest vocalist Dave Cousins (The Strawbs), who reportedly approached the recording with the actor Laurence Olivier in mind.

The following album, High 'n' Dry (1981), also contains a song titled "On Through the Night", but this was not an outtake from the sessions for this album; it was an entirely new song. Elliott later commented that it was "like having two title tracks on one album".

== Reception ==
Professional ratings
Review scores
Source	Rating
AllMusic	3.5/5 stars
Collector's Guide to Heavy Metal	8/10
Encyclopedia of Popular Music	3/5 stars
Sputnikmusic	3.0/5

The album received mostly positive reviews. AllMusic's Steve Huey noted in a retrospective review that On Through the Night "established the band as one of the leading lights of the New Wave of British Heavy Metal." Although he stated that "it may lack the detailed production and more pop-oriented songwriting of later efforts, (...) some Leppard fans prefer this sound." Canadian journalist Martin Popoff praised the album for being "one of the most polished and savvy of the NWOBHM", evoking the sound of "acts like Thin Lizzy, UFO, even Queen and Mott the Hoople." For him, On Through the Night was "a welcome breath of fresh air" among the dark, "thrashy" and "punky" music coming from the UK at the time. Rolling Stone's David Fricke reviewed the album favorably on the same wavelength, explaining that it "shows they not only respect their elders, they've taken cues from their New Wave peers, too." He also stated that "guitarists Pete Willis and Steve Clark shoot from the hip, packing their licks into tight, three-minute pop arrangements", and that lead singer Joe Elliott "wails wonderfully in a resonating tenor, fortified by backup harmonies and Tom Allom's battering-ram production." He concluded that the band "displays a wisdom beyond their years" in mixing melody and heaviness, coming up with an album that "is awfully impressive for a band making its vinyl debut." Sputnikmusic staff review noted that the "middle-class common-man image" of the "New Wave of British Heavy Metal" movement "partially played a part in making Def Leppard one of [its] leaders". He also stated that the band's ambition "would never allow [them] to be tunnel-visioned", but he concluded that On Through the Night "can be categorized as a grower of an album since the more superficial elements that would appeal to the mainstream will initially distract some listeners from what is actually an incredibly tight musical and vocal performance."

Record World said that the single "Rock Brigade" has "inventive guitar leads and pulsating dance rhythms."

Most of the songs on the album were dropped from the band's live setlists after 1983, although "Rock Brigade" and "Wasted" would see periodic revivals after 2000. Also, the non-album track from the same era entitled "Good Morning Freedom" would be played live in 2013 during the opening to the "Viva Hysteria" shows.

== Track listing ==
Side one
No.	Title	Writer(s)	Solos	Length
1.	"Rock Brigade"	Steve Clark; Joe Elliott; Rick Savage	Pete Willis	3:09
2.	"Hello America"	Clark; Elliott; Savage	Clark	3:27
3.	"Sorrow Is a Woman"	Clark; Elliott; Savage; Willis	1 & 3 – Clark; 2 & 3 – Willis	3:54
4.	"It Could Be You"	Elliott; Willis	Willis	2:33
5.	"Satellite"	Clark; Elliott; Savage; Willis	Willis; ride out licks: Clark	4:28
6.	"When the Walls Came Tumbling Down"	Clark; Elliott; Andrew Smith	Clark	4:44

Side two
No.	Title	Writer(s)	Solos	Length
7.	"Wasted"	Clark; Elliott	Clark	3:45
8.	"Rocks Off"	Clark; Elliott; Savage; Willis	Clark	3:42
9.	"It Don't Matter"	Clark; Elliott; Willis	Willis	3:21
10.	"Answer to the Master"	Clark; Elliott; Savage; Willis	1 – Clark; 2 – Willis	3:13
11.	"Overture"	Clark; Elliott; Savage; Willis	1, 2 & 4 – Clark; 3 & 5 – Willis	7:44

== Personnel ==
Def Leppard

- Joe Elliott – lead vocals
- Pete Willis – guitar, backing vocals
- Steve Clark – guitar, backing vocals
- Rick Savage – bass guitar, backing vocals
- Rick Allen – drums, backing vocals

Additional musicians

- Chris M. Hughes – synthesiser on "Hello America"
- Dave Cousins – voice on "When the Walls Came Tumblin' Down"

Production

- (Colonel) Tom Allom – producer
- Louis "Snook" Austin – engineer
- Dick Plant – engineer
- Alan Schmidt – artwork

== Charts ==
Chart (1980)	Peak position
Australian Albums (Kent Music Report)	98
UK Albums (Official Charts)	15
US Billboard 200	51

Chart (2020)	Peak position
Scottish Albums (Official Charts)	55
UK Rock & Metal Albums (Official Charts)	4

== Certifications ==
Region	Certification	Certified units/sales
Canada (Music Canada)	Platinum	100,000^{^}
United States (RIAA)	Platinum	1,000,000^{^}
^{^} Shipments figures based on certification alone.
