= Let It Go (Def Leppard song) =

1981 single by Def Leppard

Single by Def Leppard

from the album High 'n' Dry
- B-side: "Switch 625"
- Released: 14 August 1981 (UK)
- Recorded: March–June 1981
- Studio: Battery Studios (London)
- Genre: Hard rock, heavy metal
- Length: 4:43
- Label: Polygram; Mercury
- Songwriters: Pete Willis; Steve Clark; Joe Elliott
- Producer: Robert John "Mutt" Lange

Def Leppard singles chronology
"Rock Brigade" (1980)	"Let It Go" (1981)	"Bringin' On the Heartbreak" (1981)

Music videos
- "Let It Go" on YouTube

"Let it Go" is a 1981 song by English rock band Def Leppard from their multi-platinum album High 'n' Dry. It was one of two singles from the album, and reached number 34 on the US Mainstream Rock charts. It was originally titled "When the Rain Falls" with different lyrics as played at New Theatre in Oxford in 1980.

The 7" single runs about 30 seconds shorter than the album version; no lyrics are removed, but the opening guitar intro and the other guitar solos are shortened slightly.

Record World commented on the "twin-guitar barrage, Joe Elliott's go-for-broke vocal and the sensory overload of Mutt Lange's production."

== Music video ==
The music video for this song was directed by Doug Smith and shot on 22 July 1981 at the Royal Court Theatre in Liverpool, England. The photo on "Let It Go" single cover was taken from that shoot. Other songs filmed that day were "High 'n' Dry (Saturday Night)" and "Bringin' On the Heartbreak".

== Live performances ==
"Let It Go" is the second most-played song from High 'n' Dry after "Bringin' On the Heartbreak". The song was played consistently on the tours supporting its parent album, Pyromania and Hysteria, but was then discarded completely until 1999. However, since then "Let It Go" has been quite frequently reintroduced into setlists.

== Personnel ==
- Joe Elliott – lead vocals
- Steve Clark – lead guitar, backing vocals
- Pete Willis – rhythm guitar, ride-out solo, backing vocals
- Rick Savage – bass guitar, backing vocals
- Rick Allen – drums, backing vocals

== Charts ==
Chart (1981)	Peak position
US Mainstream Rock (Billboard)	34
