= Frank Noon =

English drummer

- Born: 5 October 1956 (age 70); London, England
- Genres: Hard rock, pop rock
- Occupation: Musician
- Instrument: Drums

Frank Noon (born 5 October 1956) is an English drummer who played with the bands Def Leppard and Roadhouse.

== Career ==
Frank Noon was a member of the trio The Next Band before, during, and after the time he was in Def Leppard, and played on The Next Band's Four by Three E.P. Noon played on Def Leppard's The Def Leppard E.P. in 1979. Noon was never an official member of Def Leppard. Although he was asked to join permanently, he declined the offer to stay with The Next Band. He was preceded in Def Leppard by original drummer Tony Kenning and succeeded by current drummer Rick Allen.

About thirteen years later, he played in the band Roadhouse with Pete Willis, who was a member of Def Leppard when Noon performed with them. He played on Roadhouse's demo, but was replaced by drummer Trevor Brewis before the recording of Roadhouse's album.

Noon also played drums for various other bands including Lionheart, Wild Fire, Wild Horses (not to be confused with an American band of the same name), Stampede, Waysted, Di'anno, More, and Crazy Lesbians.

== Discography ==
=== With The Next Band ===
- Four by Three EP (1978)

=== With Def Leppard ===
- The Def Leppard E.P. (1979)

=== With Bernie Tormé and the Electric Gypsies ===
- Shoorah Shoorah (1982)

=== With Waysted ===
- Vices (1983)

=== With Roadhouse ===
- demo
