= Pyromania (album) =

Studio album by Def Leppard
- Released: 20 January 1983
- Recorded: January–November 1982
- Studios: Parkgate, Sussex; Battery, London
- Genres: Glam metal; hard rock; heavy metal
- Length: 44:59
- Label: Vertigo
- Producer: Robert John "Mutt" Lange

Def Leppard chronology
High 'n' Dry (1981)	Pyromania (1983)	Hysteria (1987)

Singles from Pyromania
- 1. "Photograph" Released: January 1983; 2. "Rock of Ages" Released: June 1983; 3. "Foolin'" Released: August 1983; 4. "Too Late for Love" Released: November 1983

Audio
- "Album" playlist on YouTube

Pyromania is the third studio album by English rock band Def Leppard, released on 20 January 1983 through Vertigo Records in Europe and through Mercury Records in the US. The first album to feature guitarist Phil Collen who replaced founding member Pete Willis, Pyromania was produced by Robert John "Mutt" Lange. The album was a shift away from the band's traditional heavy metal roots toward a more radio-friendly sound, finding massive mainstream success. Pyromania charted at No. 2 on the Billboard 200, No. 4 on the Canadian RPM Album chart and No. 18 on the UK Albums Chart. Selling over ten million copies in the US, it has been certified diamond by the RIAA.

== Recording ==
In January 1982, the band began writing and pre-production for Pyromania in Sheffield. At Lange's suggestion, they focused on generating song ideas such as guitar riffs, or vocal and lyric fragments, rather than finished songs. The idea was to assemble songs in the studio, rather than arrive with pre-written songs which Lange would likely want to change. When they reconvened with Lange in London, the band and Lange would select the best ideas to assemble into finished songs.

The band and Lange followed an unusual approach of recording with the album: the bass parts and guitars were recorded first to a click track provided by a Linn LM-1 drum machine, with the drums being added last in the process. This contrasted with the more typical practice of recording drums parts first, and gave them flexibility to rearrange and re-cut parts of the song as they went along in the studio. The band also had trouble finding guitar sounds they preferred, and tried multiple Marshall amplifiers. At one point they wanted to burn all the amplifiers, inspiring the album's title.

The album was partially recorded with original guitarist Pete Willis, whose rhythm guitar tracks appear on all songs. On 11 July 1982, Willis was fired for alcohol abuse which hampered his musical performance. He was quickly replaced by guitarist Phil Collen, who was already friends with the band and stepped in to add guitar solos to several songs. "I had all the fun stuff, none of the heavy lifting..." Collen remembered. "Pete and Steve [Clark] had done these amazing rhythm guitar beds, and it was a joy to whizz around and play solos over the top... Mutt [Lange] was going, 'Just have fun: be a lead guitarist, go nuts.'" On the original LP release, Willis is visible in the background of the photograph of singer Joe Elliott, while Collen has his own photo as a new full-time member.

The album can be seen as a transitional one between the heavy metal sound of Leppard's first two albums and the radio-friendly hard rock direction of later releases. It featured rockers such as "Rock! Rock! (Till You Drop)", "Stagefright" and "Die Hard the Hunter" as well as the Top 40 hits "Photograph", "Rock of Ages" and "Foolin'".

== Release ==
With its melodic hooks and heavy MTV exposure, Pyromania became a massive success, and was a major catalyst for the 1980s pop-metal movement. The album sold six million copies in the US in its original release (about 100,000 copies per week for much of the year). It has since sold over ten million there and been certified diamond. In 1989, it was re-released by audio fidelity company Mobile Fidelity Sound Labs as part of their Ultradisc series.

After being released in January 1983, it became the first glam metal album to reach top ten in the Billboard charts on March 12, later it peaked at number two on May 14, then staying in the top ten albums until it dropped to eleventh place on November 26, eventually falling off the Billboard 200 chart after 123 weeks.

"Photograph", "Rock of Ages" and "Foolin'" became top 40 singles on the Billboard Hot 100 in the US, with "Photograph" peaking at No. 13 and "Rock of Ages" at No. 16. "Photograph" (6 weeks) and "Rock of Ages" (1 week) both topped the Billboard Top Rock Tracks while "Foolin'" and "Too Late for Love" made the Top 10. "Comin' Under Fire", "Billy's Got a Gun" and "Action! Not Words" made the top 40 of the Top Rock Tracks chart.

In Canada, "Rock of Ages" charted highest at No. 24, while "Photograph" and "Foolin'" reached No. 32 and No. 39, respectively. At CHUM-AM in Toronto, one of Canada's largest audience Top 40 stations at the time, "Rock of Ages" never reached its Top 30 countdown; whereas 70 km away in Hamilton, at the CKOC-AM Top 40 radio station, it peaked at No. 2. It also topped the chart at many album-oriented rock stations such as Q107 in Toronto. "Rock of Ages" also charted the highest in the UK at No. 41 compared to No. 66 for "Photograph".

== Critical reception and legacy ==
Professional ratings
Review scores
Source	Rating
AllMusic	5/5 stars
Classic Rock	5/5 stars
Collector's Guide to Heavy Metal	10/10
The Encyclopedia of Popular Music	4/5 stars
The Great Rock Discography	10/10
MusicHound Rock	4.5/5
Rolling Stone	4/5 stars
The Rolling Stone Album Guide	4.5/5 stars
Sputnikmusic	4.5/5
The Village Voice	C

Pyromania has received mostly positive reviews, being commonly considered, along with its follow-up, Hysteria, one of the band's finest efforts to date, and one of "Mutt" Lange's best productions. David Fricke of Rolling Stone praised Leppard for putting "much-needed fire back on the radio", producing sophisticated music "more emotionally charged than most of the synthesized disco that passes for 'modern music'" over the airwaves; adding that the band "may not be highly original, but they mean what they play" and "Lange's artfully busy mix" easily covers up any fault.

AllMusic reviewer Steve Huey stated that Pyromania was "where the band's vision coalesced and gelled into something more." He described the songs as "driven by catchy, shiny melodic hooks instead of heavy guitar riffs, although the latter do pop up once in a while", and added that "transcendent hard rock perfection on Pyromania was surprisingly successful; their reach never exceeded their grasp, which makes the album an enduring (and massively influential) classic." Sputnikmusic staff reviewer, equally enthusiastic, thoroughly recommended the album, "filled with tight musicianship, infectious melodies and anthemic choruses" "to pretty much anyone... No matter what their taste in music is." Ultimate Classic Rock described the album as a “set of slick, hi-fi rockers ornamented with poppy synthesizers and towering vocal harmonies”, in which Def Leppard was “laying the groundwork for their world domination and inspiring a wave of copycats."

In contrast, Canadian journalist Martin Popoff considers Pyromania the beginning of Leppard's "creative degeneration" and criticizes Lange's "painstaking approach to detail" that strips the album "of its sweat and grit", making it sound "phony".

"I remember meeting Phil Lynott..." recalled Joe Elliott. "We'd delivered Pyromania and, with us sharing a label with Lizzy, he'd heard it. He put his hand on my shoulder and said, 'I heard your album – it's the reason I've split the band. I can't compete with that.' The crappiest backhand compliment I've ever had. I wish I had been brave enough to shove him up against the wall and say, 'Well, make a better album then!' But I just said, 'Oh,' and scuttled off."

In 2003, the album was ranked No. 384 on Rolling Stone's 500 Greatest Albums of All Time. In 2006, Q magazine placed the album at No. 35 in its list of "40 Best Albums of the '80s". In 2015, Rolling Stone ranked Pyromania at No. 17 among the 50 Greatest Hair Metal Albums of All Time, and in 2017, the same magazine listed the album at No. 52 on its list of the 100 Greatest Metal Albums of All Time. In 2024, Loudwire staff elected it as the best hard rock album of 1983.

== Track listing ==
=== Original release ===
Side one
No.	Title	Writer(s)	Length
1.	"Rock! Rock! (Till You Drop)"	Steve Clark; Joe Elliott; Robert John "Mutt" Lange; Rick Savage	3:52
2.	"Photograph"	Clark; Elliott; Lange; Savage; Pete Willis	4:12
3.	"Stagefright"	Elliott; Lange; Savage	3:46
4.	"Too Late for Love"	Clark; Elliott; Lange; Savage; Willis	4:30
5.	"Die Hard the Hunter"	Clark; Elliott; Lange; Savage	6:17

Side two
No.	Title	Writer(s)	Length
6.	"Foolin'"	Clark; Elliott; Lange	4:34
7.	"Rock of Ages"	Clark; Elliott; Lange	4:09
8.	"Comin' Under Fire"	Clark; Elliott; Lange; Willis	4:20
9.	"Action! Not Words"	Clark; Elliott; Lange	3:49
10.	"Billy's Got a Gun"	Clark; Elliott; Lange; Savage; Willis	5:56

- "Comin' Under Fire" and "Action! Not Words" are listed inversely on the original Mercury vinyl release, but play in the order above.
- The last 56 seconds of track 10 following "Billy's Got a Gun" is a hidden track named "The March of the Wooden Zombies".

=== 2009 deluxe edition bonus disc ===
Live – L.A. Forum, 11 September 1983
No.	Title	Writer(s)	Length
1.	"Rock! Rock! (Till You Drop)"	Clark; Elliott; Lange; Savage	4:16
2.	"Rock Brigade"	Clark; Elliott; Savage	3:25
3.	"High 'n' Dry (Saturday Night)"	Clark; Elliott; Savage	3:22
4.	"Another Hit and Run"	Elliott; Savage	6:14
5.	"Billy's Got a Gun"	Clark; Elliott; Lange; Savage; Willis	4:43
6.	"Mirror Mirror (Look into My Eyes)"	Clark; Elliott	4:24
7.	"Foolin'"	Clark; Elliott; Lange	4:59
8.	"Photograph"	Clark; Elliott; Lange; Savage; Willis	4:03
9.	"Rock of Ages"	Clark; Elliott; Lange	4:53
10.	"Bringin' On the Heartbreak"	Clark; Elliott; Willis	4:06
11.	"Switch 625"	Clark	3:23
12.	"Let It Go"	Clark; Elliott; Willis	5:56
13.	"Wasted"	Clark; Elliott	5:55
14.	"Stagefright"	Elliott; Lange; Savage	4:55
15.	"Travelin' Band" (featuring Brian May)	John Fogerty	6:09

== Personnel ==
=== Def Leppard ===
- Joe Elliott – lead vocals
- Steve Clark – guitars, backing vocals
- Phil Collen – guitar solos (tracks 1–3, 6, 7), backing vocals
- Rick Savage – bass, backing vocals
- Rick Allen – drums, backing vocals
- Pete Willis – rhythm guitar (all tracks)

=== Additional musicians ===
- "The Leppardettes" (Robert John "Mutt" Lange, Terry Wilson-Slesser, Rocky Newton, Pete Overend Watts, Chris Thompson) – backing vocals
- John Kongos – Fairlight CMI programming
- Thomas Dolby – keyboard (credited as Booker T. Boffin)
- Tony Kaye – additional keyboards (uncredited)

=== Production ===
- Robert John "Mutt" Lange – producer, mixing
- Mike Shipley – engineer
- Nigel Green – engineer, mixing (uncredited)
- Brian "Chuck" New – assistant engineer (Battery Studios)
- Craig "Too Loud for Boys" Thomson – engineer (Park Gate Studios) (Note: Miscredited as assistant engineer in the liner notes according to Thomson. He also recalls that Mike Shipley was not present for the Park Gates sessions.)
- Bob Ludwig – mastering
- Bernard Gudynas – front cover illustration
- David Landslide – back cover photograph
- Satori – album sleeve concept and design

== Charts ==
1983–1984 chart performance for Pyromania
Chart (1983–1984)	Peak position
Australian Albums (Kent Music Report)	70
Canada Top Albums/CDs (RPM)	4
Finnish Albums (The Official Finnish Charts)	30
Japanese Albums (Oricon)	70
New Zealand Albums (RMNZ)	26
Swedish Albums (Sverigetopplistan)	23
UK Albums (Official Charts)	18
US Billboard 200	2

2024 chart performance for Pyromania
Chart (2024)	Peak position
German Albums (Offizielle Top 100)	20
Scottish Albums (Official Charts)	18
Swiss Albums (Schweizer Hitparade)	45

== Certifications ==
Region	Certification	Certified units/sales
Canada (Music Canada)	7× Platinum	700,000^{^}
France (SNEP)	Gold	100,000^{*}
United Kingdom (BPI)	Silver	60,000^{^}
United States (RIAA)	Diamond	10,000,000^{^}
^{*} Sales figures based on certification alone.^{^} Shipments figures based on certification alone.

== See also ==
- List of best-selling albums in the United States
- List of glam metal albums and songs
