= Def Leppard (album) =

Studio album by Def Leppard
- Released: 30 October 2015
- Recorded: 2014–2015
- Studio: Joe's Garage in Dublin, Ireland and Phil's Sweat Shop, California, US
- Genre: Hard rock
- Length: 52:39
- Label: Bludgeon Riffola/Mailboat (US); earMUSIC (Europe)
- Producer: Ronan McHugh; Def Leppard

Def Leppard chronology
Viva! Hysteria (2013)	Def Leppard (2015)	And There Will Be a Next Time... Live from Detroit (2017)

Singles from Def Leppard
- 1. "Let's Go" Released: 15 September 2015; 2. "Dangerous" Released: 12 February 2016; 3. "Man Enough" Released: 4 April 2016; 4. "We Belong" Released: 8 December 2016

Music video
- "We Belong" on YouTube

Def Leppard is the eleventh studio album by the English rock band Def Leppard, released on 30 October 2015. The band's first studio album since 2008's Songs from the Sparkle Lounge (marking the longest gap between two studio albums in their career) and their first on earMUSIC Records, it became their seventh top ten album on the Billboard 200 after debuting at number 10. The first single "Let's Go" was released 15 September 2015, alongside the artwork and track listing.

The album was produced by Ronan McHugh and Def Leppard. It won a 2016 Classic Rock Roll of Honours Award for Album of the Year.

== Background ==
In August 2015, singer Joe Elliott stated that the album would consist of 14 tracks with a running time of around 55 minutes. Regarding the sound of the album, he explained "It's just called Def Leppard because that's what it sounds like. It doesn't sound like any one specific era of Def Leppard. It's got everything. [...] Every single aspect of anything we've ever wanted to put out — acoustic, heavy, soft, slow, fast — it's there. That's why we call it Def Leppard because, just like Queen were, we're capable of coming up with vastly different kinds of songs."

Guitarist Phil Collen referred to the album as "probably the most diverse thing we've done" as well as "the best thing we've done since Hysteria" as it contains "the loudest rock guitars we've ever had on some tracks." However, he stopped short of calling it an "experimental" album, instead saying that it's "more liberating and expressive".

The album was recorded at Elliott's home studio, named Joe's Garage, in Dublin, Ireland.

== Singles ==
Classic Rock album fan pack

Vocalist Joe Elliott has described lead single and opening track, "Let's Go", as "a call to arms and a classic Def Leppard song. It's that three-minute pop-rock stuff with big chunky guitars and a big chorus. And it has that swaggering, mid-tempo rhythm, like "Pour Some Sugar on Me", and "Rock of Ages"." He described that the band wanted a familiar sounding song to introduce the album, being released several years after their previous album.

== Reception ==
Professional ratings
Aggregate scores
Source	Rating
Metacritic	68/100
Review scores
Source	Rating
AllMusic	3.5/5 stars
The Arts Desk	2/5 stars
Classic Rock	4/5 stars
Kerrang!	4/5 stars
Mojo	3/5 stars
PopMatters	8/10
Rolling Stone	2.5/5 stars

Joe Elliott, observed Classic Rock, "is the first to admit that Leppard aren't Bob Dylan. Sometimes they're barely even Bob the Builder. But then that's the beauty of it – if ever a band were cliché-proof, it's Def Leppard. If nothing else, you have to admire their sheer brass balls. With its crackling guitar and nuclear-detonation bottom end, 'Let's Go' doesn't so much revisit 'Pour Some Sugar On Me' as move into its spare room, steal its cornflakes and start sleeping with its wife. But even that pales into insignificance next to the finger-poppin' white-boy funk of 'Are You Man Enough?', which rips off Queen's 'Another One Bites the Dust' so shamelessly that it should come with its own stick-on handlebar moustaches… But for the most part, Def Leppard is the sound of a band who have rediscovered their sense of purpose." Rating the album 3.5 out of 5, Stephen Thomas Erlewine wrote that Def Leppard is "a summation of where the band is now: they love the past, both their own and their inspirations, but they're not looking back, they're loving the life they live."

== Track listing ==
No.	Title	Writer(s)	Length
1.	"Let's Go"	Rick Savage; Joe Elliott	5:01
2.	"Dangerous"	Phil Collen; Elliott	3:26
3.	"Man Enough"	Collen; Elliott	3:54
4.	"We Belong"	Elliott	5:06
5.	"Invincible"	Rick Allen; Elliott	3:46
6.	"Sea of Love"	Collen	4:04
7.	"Energized"	Collen	3:23
8.	"All Time High"	Elliott	4:19
9.	"Battle of My Own"	Savage; Elliott	2:42
10.	"Broke 'N' Brokenhearted"	Collen; Elliott	3:17
11.	"Forever Young"	Collen; Elliott	2:22
12.	"Last Dance"	Savage	3:09
13.	"Wings of an Angel"	Collen; Vivian Campbell; Savage; Elliott	4:23
14.	"Blind Faith"	Collen; Campbell; Savage; Elliott	5:33
Total length:			52:39

Classic Rock limited edition fan pack exclusive tracks
No.	Title	Length
15.	"We Belong" (alternative vocal take)	5:06
16.	"Let's Go" (UK radio edit)	3:56

Japanese limited edition bonus track
No.	Title	Length
15.	"Last Dance" (Demo)	3:09

== Personnel ==
Def Leppard

- Joe Elliott – lead & backing vocals, acoustic guitars
- Phil Collen – guitar, backing vocals, co-lead vocals on "We Belong"
- Vivian Campbell – guitar, backing vocals, co-lead vocals on "We Belong"
- Rick Savage – bass guitar, backing vocals, additional guitars, co-lead vocals on "We Belong", lead vocals on "Last Dance (Demo)"
- Rick Allen – drums, percussion, co-lead vocals on "We Belong"

Additional personnel

- Debbi Blackwell-Cook – backing vocals on "Sea of Love"
- Ronan McHugh – keyboards, bouzouki, Mellotron, producer, engineer

== Charts ==
=== Weekly charts ===
Chart (2015–2016)	Peak position
Australian Albums (ARIA)	4
Austrian Albums (Ö3 Austria)	18
Belgian Albums (Ultratop Flanders)	85
Belgian Albums (Ultratop Wallonia)	39
Canadian Albums (Billboard)	11
Dutch Albums (Album Top 100)	79
Finnish Albums (Suomen virallinen lista)	32
Hungarian Albums (MAHASZ)	33
Irish Albums (IRMA)	57
Italian Albums (FIMI)	36
New Zealand Albums (RMNZ)	17
Norwegian Albums (VG-lista)	15
Scottish Albums (OCC)	7
Swedish Albums (Sverigetopplistan)	11
Swiss Albums (Schweizer Hitparade)	2
UK Albums (OCC)	11
UK Independent Albums (OCC)	2
UK Rock & Metal Albums (OCC)	1
US Billboard 200	10
US Top Rock Albums (Billboard)	1
US Top Hard Rock Albums (Billboard)	1
US Independent Albums (Billboard)	1

=== Year-end charts ===
Chart (2015)	Rank
US Hard Rock Albums (Billboard)	39

Chart (2016)	Rank
US Hard Rock Albums (Billboard)	31
US Independent Albums (Billboard)	50
