= Rick Savage =

British bass guitarist

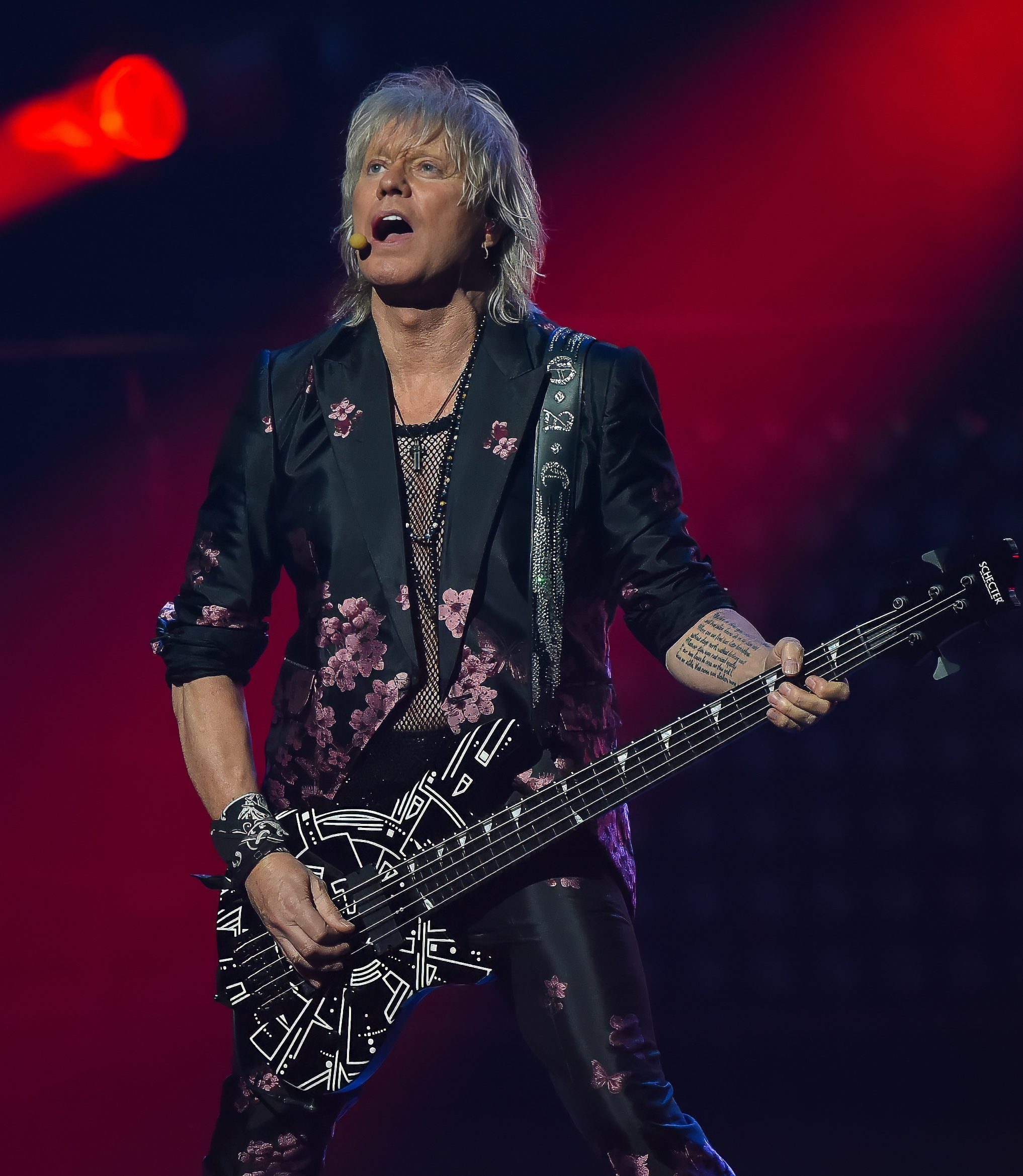
- Rick Savage performing in 2025

Background information
- Also known as: Sav
- Born: Richard Savage; 2 December 1960 (age 65); Sheffield, Yorkshire, England
- Genres: Heavy metal; hard rock; glam metal; arena rock; pop rock
- Occupation: Musician
- Instrument: Bass guitar
- Years active: 1976–present
- Member of: Def Leppard
- Website: defleppard.com

Richard Savage (born 2 December 1960) is an English musician best known as the bass guitarist and a founding member of the rock band Def Leppard. Savage and lead singer Joe Elliott are the only two remaining original members of the band. With drummer Rick Allen, they are also the only members who have performed on every album.

== Biography ==
Savage was born in Sheffield and educated at Tapton Secondary School in Sheffield. In his youth, he learned to play guitar along with his older brother. They played songs like Rod Stewart's "Maggie May" and Don McLean's "American Pie." Savage also pursued a career as a professional football player with Sheffield United, despite him being a Sheffield Wednesday supporter. In his teens he was a keen runner and attended Hallamshire Harriers athletics club in the Hillsborough area of the city. He ultimately chose music and formed a band with a few schoolmates, including Tony Kenning, and eventually Pete Willis. As Atomic Mass they mostly covered Queen, Slade, Deep Purple, Jimi Hendrix, and other popular rock artists of the time.

At one point, they decided that Willis was the better guitar player, so Savage picked up the bass guitar. Needing a singer, they auditioned an acquaintance of Willis', Joe Elliott. They subsequently picked up guitarist Steve Clark and changed their name to Def Leppard.

Savage contracted Bell's palsy around 1994. This causes his facial muscles to weaken and become partially paralyzed. He has recovered, but effects of the disease are still visible, especially when he is fatigued.

From an interview by Gordon Shearer on DefLeppard.com:

Shearer: "What about when you developed your Bell's palsy? Did that change the way you dealt with things? Lots of gossip, lots of comments. I could imagine going from the position that you were in – from ultimate rock sex god to...."

Savage: "It was hard to come to terms with and to understand why. I found it was easy to get into the 'why me?' syndrome. Partly because of the disability. It was more not being able to eat properly, or not being able to sleep without putting a patch on your eye because your eye wouldn't close, and things like that. The effect that it has on your everyday life was the hardest thing. In comparison, it was a very minor debilitating disease. It keeps you humble seeing what Rick Allen went through and how he had to deal with things. So, I would rather have not got the disease, but I did and you make the best of what you got".

== Personal life ==
Savage is married to Paige Savage, with whom he has three children (one from Paige's prior relationship). The family moved to Enniskerry in 2013, but returned to Sheffield in 2016.

== Equipment ==
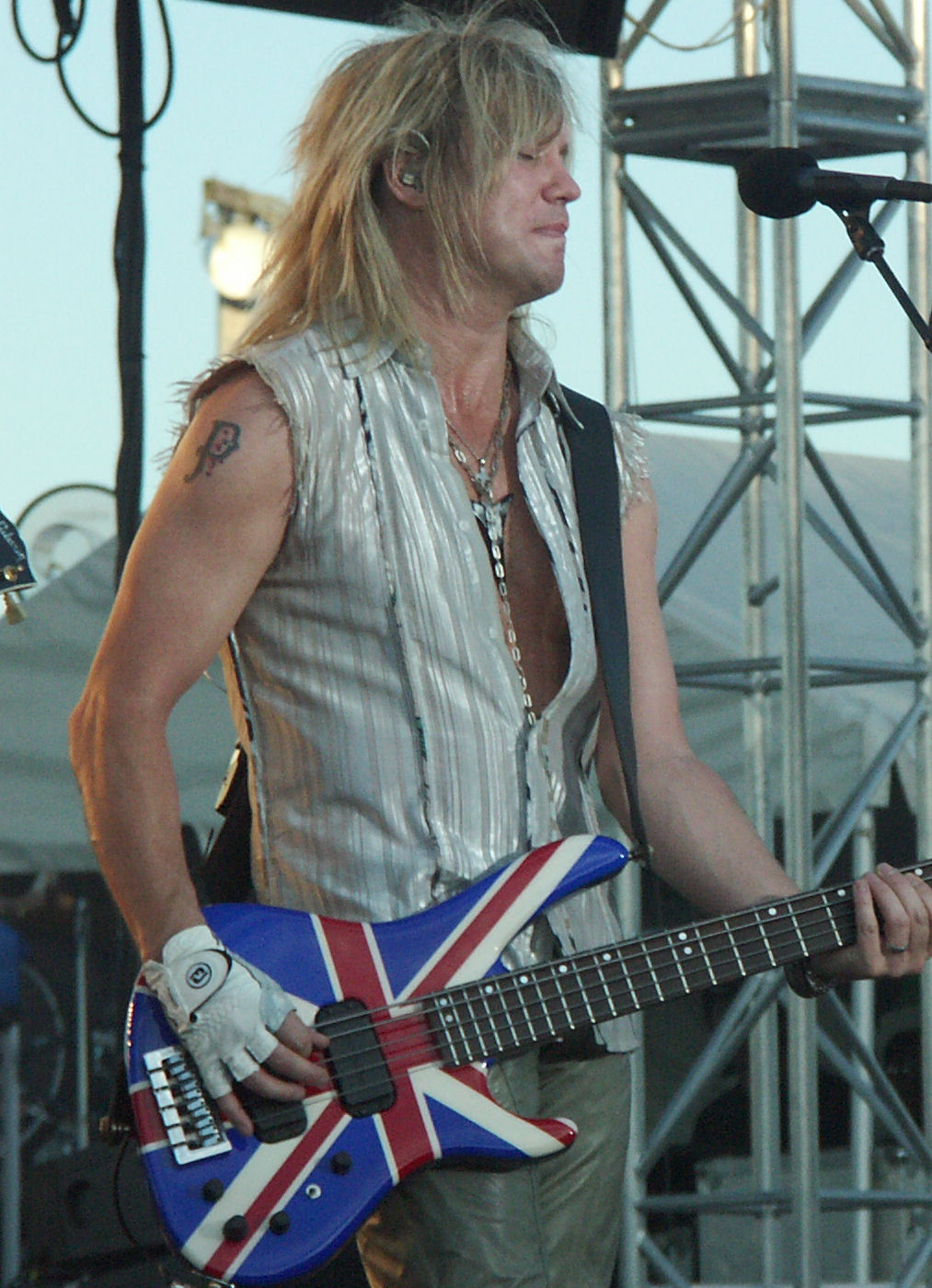
Savage in 2007

Savage currently uses custom basses made by Jackson after endorsing Washburn XB920 (4-string) and XB925 (5-string) bass guitars from 1999 to 2009. He formerly used Hamer 4 and 5-string bass guitars for over 17 years, starting with their Gibson Explorer-inspired "Blitz" model during the High 'n' Dry and Pyromania albums from 1982 to 1985 and Hamer's modernistic take on the Explorer shape, the "Scarab" model of which he mainly used a white model during the Hysteria recording sessions and tour (although Savage continued to use a black-colored "Blitz" downtuned C#ADG for the hit single "Pour Some Sugar on Me" which can be seen on their Live: In the Round, in Your Face live video/DVD, and a Scarab model in black with a reverse headstock was seen in the "Rocket" video and their performance at the MTV Video Music Awards in 1989) from 1985 to 1989. At the release of Adrenalize he used an array of Chaparral Max 5-string models in various colours including a black & white "Granite" finish, one with a variation of the Adrenalize album artwork custom painted on it, and a black-painted model from 1990 to 1999. Savage switched endorsements to Washburn basses in the middle of the promotion cycle for the Euphoria album in 1999, and a Natural Flame XB925 given to him by Washburn in 1999 has been his main instrument since then. However the custom painted Union Jack XB925 is his most well known bass, followed by the Saint George's Cross XB925, with both paint schemes reproduced on his new Jackson basses in 2009. He acquired two more of the Jackson basses, one in a grey-toned Union Jack scheme and the other painted in the colors of Sheffield Wednesday with the team's logo. He used these on the 2011 Mirrorball tour. Savage never has been a fingerstyle bassist, relying entirely on a plectrum, or "pick". In an interview with Bass Guitar magazine, he stated: "I'm a terrible player with my fingers and I always play with a pick. I love to have consistency within the sound no matter where you are on the fretboard. I've found that when I play with fingers, notes jump out and others are too muted. It would be a nightmare for the sound engineer just trying to compress the thing to make sure there's an equal balance coming off the stage."

== Discography ==
with Def Leppard

- The Def Leppard E.P. (1979)
- On Through the Night (1980)
- High 'n' Dry (1981)
- Pyromania (1983)
- Hysteria (1987)
- Adrenalize (1992)
- Retro Active (1993)
- Slang (1996)
- Euphoria (1999)
- X (2002)
- Yeah! (2006)
- Songs from the Sparkle Lounge (2008)
- Mirror Ball – Live & More (2011)
- Viva! Hysteria (2013)
- Def Leppard (2015)
- Diamond Star Halos (2022)
- Drastic Symphonies (2023)
