= High 'n' Dry =

- Cover art by Hipgnosis

Studio album by Def Leppard
- Released: 6 July 1981
- Recorded: March–June 1981
- Studio: Battery Studios (London)
- Genres: Heavy metal; hard rock
- Length: 42:15
- Label: Vertigo
- Producer: Robert John "Mutt" Lange

Def Leppard chronology
On Through the Night (1980)	High 'n' Dry (1981)	Pyromania (1983)

Singles from High 'n' Dry
- 1. "Let It Go" Released: 14 August 1981; 2. "Bringin' On the Heartbreak" Released: 13 November 1981 (US)

Professional ratings
Review scores
Source	Rating
AllMusic	4/5 stars
Collector's Guide to Heavy Metal	9/10
Sputnikmusic	3.5/5 stars

High 'n' Dry is the second studio album by the English rock band Def Leppard, released on 6 July 1981. High 'n' Dry was Pete Willis' last full-time album with Def Leppard. It charted at No. 38 on the Billboard 200 and No. 26 on the UK Albums Chart. "High 'n' Dry (Saturday Night)", ranked No. 33 on VH1's 40 Greatest Metal Songs. Following the success of Pyromania, the album re-entered in the US chart and reached No. 72 in 1983.

== Music ==
The album's music has been described as heavy metal and hard rock.

The track "On Through the Night" is considered by some to be among the heaviest glam metal tracks. Revolver said frontman Joe Elliott "sounds like a stray cat in heat" in the recording, drawing comparisons to Brian Johnson of AC/DC.

This album contained the power ballad "Bringin' On the Heartbreak" and the instrumental "Switch 625", examples of their signature sound style prevalent in their next album Pyromania. High 'n' Dry stayed on the Billboard 200 chart for 123 weeks.

== Reissue ==
High 'n' Dry was reissued on 31 May 1984 with two bonus tracks:

1. "Bringin' On the Heartbreak" (Remix), a similar recording to the 1981 original but with synthesiser and piano overdubs added by Robert John "Mutt" Lange in February 1984. This remix was released as a single in June 1984, peaking at No. 61 in the US charts.
2. "Me & My Wine" (Remix), a remixed version of a 1981 B-side, with the remixed version included as the B-side to the remix of Bringin' on the Heartbreak.

The intention of these remixes was to make the two songs sound more in the style of Def Leppard's 1983 album Pyromania.

Videos for both of the remixed songs were made, featuring Phil Collen (who was not in the band at the time of the album's recording). The video for "Me & My Wine" received heavy rotation on MTV. Both bonus tracks were omitted from the US mid-1990s re-releases of the album, although other countries' releases did include them, but returned when Def Leppard and Mercury came to terms in 2018 and the album was put on digital streaming and downloading platforms.

== Reception ==
Steve Huey of AllMusic notes how Def Leppard "continues in the vein of the anthemic, working-class hard rock of their debut. While still opting for a controlled musical attack and melodies as big-sounding and stadium-ready as possible, the band opens up its arrangements a bit more on High 'n' Dry, letting the songs breathe and groove while the rhythm section and guitar riffs play off one another."

In a 3.5 out of 5 review, Sputnikmusic writes that "while High 'n' Dry cannot claim to be a resounding success as an individual album, it is indeed one from a progression standpoint. Def Leppard is clearly a more confident outfit here and with help from new producer 'Mutt' Lange, they allow their compositions to include greater scope in order for the band to find their sound. While this does result in some misses, they are never too far off target and are more than made up for by the album’s highlights which have aged extremely well."

== Track listing ==
Side one
No.	Title	Writer(s)	Solos	Length
1.	"Let It Go"	Pete Willis; Steve Clark; Joe Elliott	1st, 2nd & 3rd - Clark; ride out licks - Willis	4:43
2.	"Another Hit and Run"	Rick Savage; Elliott	1st - Clark; 2nd - Willis	4:59
3.	"High 'n' Dry (Saturday Night)"	Clark; Savage; Elliott	Willis	3:27
4.	"Bringin' On the Heartbreak"	Clark; Willis; Elliott	Clark	4:34
5.	"Switch 625" (instrumental)	Clark	Clark	3:03

Side two
No.	Title	Writer(s)	Solos	Length
6.	"You Got Me Runnin'"	Willis; Clark; Elliott	Willis	4:23
7.	"Lady Strange"	Willis; Clark; Rick Allen; Elliott	Clark	4:39
8.	"On Through the Night"	Clark; Savage; Elliott	Clark	5:06
9.	"Mirror, Mirror (Look into My Eyes)"	Clark; Elliott	Clark	4:08
10.	"No No No"	Savage; Willis; Elliott	Willis	3:13

1984 & 2018 reissue bonus tracks
No.	Title	Writer(s)	Solos	Length
11.	"Bringin' On the Heartbreak" (remix)	Clark; Willis; Elliott	Clark	4:33
12.	"Me & My Wine" (remix)	Savage; Clark; Elliott	Clark	3:40

- On vinyl and cassette releases, "Me & My Wine" (Remix) is added to the end of side one, while "Bringin' On the Heartbreak" (Remix) leads off side two. On CD releases, "Bringin' On the Heartbreak" (Remix) and "Me & My Wine" (Remix) follow "No No No".
- The last lyric, 'no', in "No No No" repeats infinitely on the original vinyl album release. The original cassette features "no" being screamed 46 times and then ending abruptly when the cassette finished. On later releases the "no"s simply fade out.

== Personnel ==
Def Leppard

- Joe Elliott – lead vocals
- Pete Willis – guitar, backing vocals
- Steve Clark – guitar, backing vocals
- Rick Savage – bass guitar, backing vocals
- Rick Allen – drums, backing vocals

Production

- Robert John "Mutt" Lange – producer, 1984 remixes
- Mike Shipley – engineer
- Nigel Green – assistant engineer
- Hipgnosis – cover design

== Charts ==
Chart (1981)	Peak position
Swedish Albums (Sverigetopplistan)	31
UK Albums (Official Charts)	26
US Billboard 200	38

Chart (2020)	Peak position
Scottish Albums (Official Charts)	52

== Certifications ==
Region	Certification	Certified units/sales
Canada (Music Canada)	Platinum	100,000^{^}
United States (RIAA)	2× Platinum	2,000,000^{^}
^{^} Shipments figures based on certification alone.

== See also ==
- List of glam metal albums and songs
