= Joe Elliott =

British musician (born 1959)

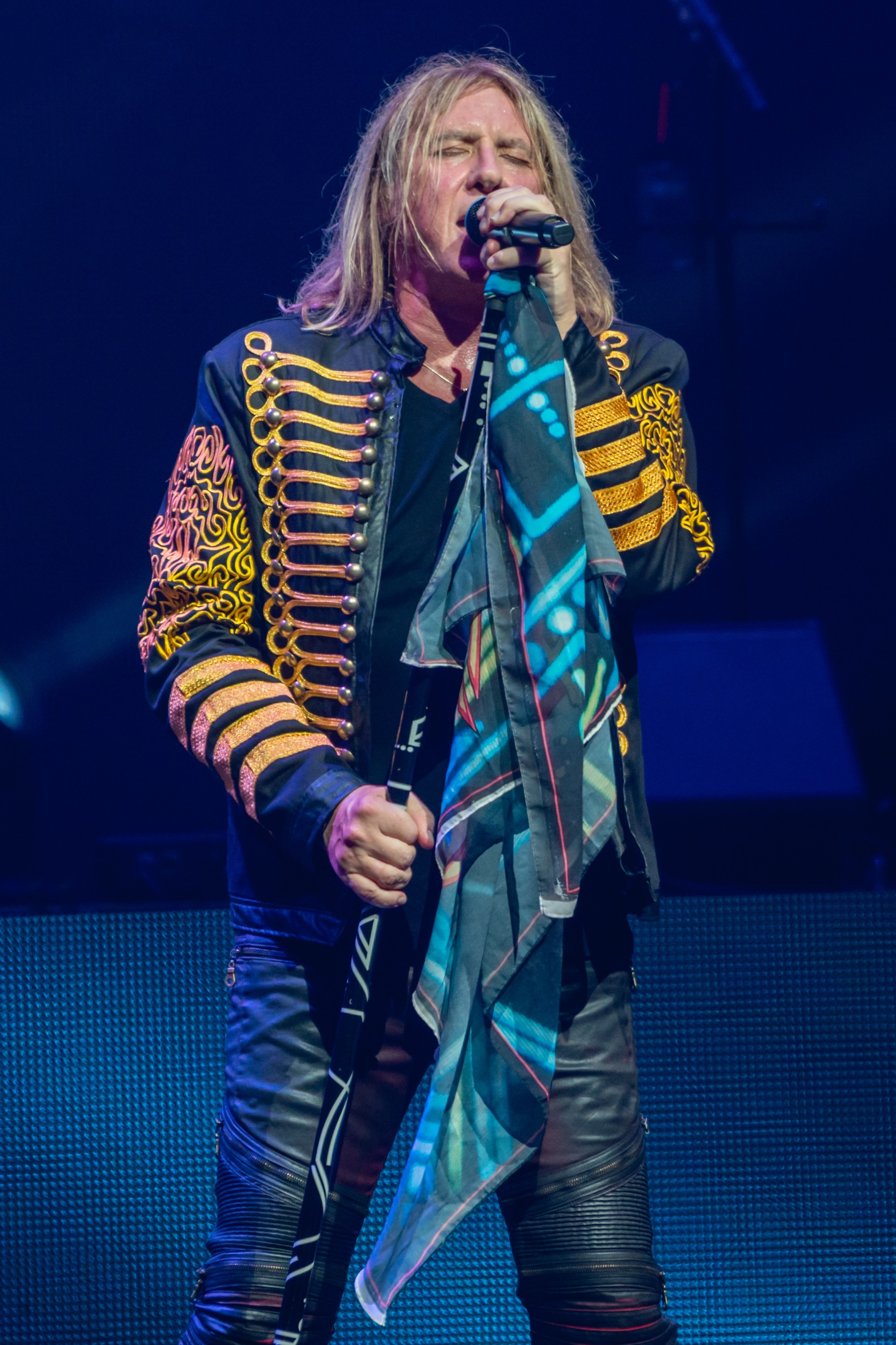
- Elliott in 2018

Background information
- Born: Joseph Thomas Elliott; 1 August 1959 (age 67); Sheffield, England
- Genres: Glam metal; hard rock; heavy metal; pop rock
- Occupations: Musician; singer; songwriter
- Instruments: Vocals; guitar; keyboards
- Years active: 1975–present
- Member of: Def Leppard; Down 'n' Outz
- Formerly of: Atomic Mass; Kings of Chaos

Joseph Thomas Elliott (born 1 August 1959) is an English musician, best known as the lead singer and one of the founding members of the hard rock band Def Leppard. He has also been the lead singer of the David Bowie tribute band the Cybernauts and the Mott the Hoople cover band Down 'n' Outz. Elliott is known for his distinctive and wide-ranging raspy vocals. He was inducted into the Rock and Roll Hall of Fame as a member of Def Leppard on 29 March 2019. He is considered by some journalists to be among the greatest glam metal singers of all time.

== Early life ==
Joseph Thomas Elliott was born in Sheffield to Joseph William Elliott (1930–2011) and Cynthia Gibson. He is an only child. He was educated at King Edward VII School.

== Def Leppard ==
At the age of 18, Elliott tried out for the band Atomic Mass as a guitarist following a chance meeting with band member Pete Willis after missing a bus in November 1977. During his audition, it was decided that he was better suited to be the lead singer. Elliott proposed the name "Deaf Leopard", which was originally a band name he thought of while designing band posters in art class. At another band member's suggestion, the spelling was slightly modified to make the name seem less like that of a punk band.

Throughout 1979, Def Leppard developed a loyal following among British hard rock and heavy metal fans and were considered among the leaders of the new wave of British heavy metal movement. Their growing popularity led to a record deal with the major label Phonogram/Vertigo (Mercury Records in the US). Def Leppard's original management, MSB, a local duo consisting of Pete Martin and Frank Stuart-Brown, were fired after Martin and Elliott got into a fistfight over an incident on the road. The band approached Peter Mensch, who became their new manager.

Def Leppard's debut album, On Through the Night, was released on 14 March 1980. The album hit the Top 15 in the UK. Their second album, High 'n' Dry, was released on 6 July 1981. The band's video for "Bringin' On the Heartbreak" became one of the first metal videos played on MTV in 1982, bringing the band increased visibility in the US. After the album's release, European and American tours followed. The band opened for Ozzy Osbourne and Blackfoot. Their third album, Pyromania, was released on 20 January 1983. The lead single, "Photograph", turned Def Leppard into a household name, supplanting Michael Jackson's "Beat It" as the most requested video on MTV and becoming a staple of rock radio. The song sparked a headline tour across the US. Fuelled by "Photograph", "Rock of Ages", and the third single "Foolin'", Pyromania went on to sell six million copies in 1983 (more than 100,000 copies every week in that year) and was held from the top of the US charts only by Michael Jackson's Thriller. With the album's massive success, Pyromania was the catalyst for the 1980s pop-metal movement. As a testament to the band's popularity at the time, a US Gallup poll in 1984 saw Def Leppard voted as favourite rock band over the Rolling Stones, AC/DC, and Journey.

After over three years of recording, Def Leppard's fourth album, Hysteria, was released on 3 August 1987. One of the first singles from the album, "Animal", started their run of ten consecutive US Billboard Hot 100 Top 40 singles. The fourth single, "Pour Some Sugar on Me". The song hit No. 2, on the Hot 100 and Hysteria finally reached the top of the US Billboard 200 in July 1988. Although "Pour Some Sugar On Me" was not initially a big hit in other countries (number 18 in the UK, number 22 in Canada, and number 26 in Australia), it has come to be regarded as the band's signature song, and was ranked No. 2 on VH1's "100 Greatest Songs of the 80s" in 2006. In October 1988, the power ballad "Love Bites" reached number one on the Billboard Hot 100. About reaching No. 1 with "Love Bites", Elliot reflected: "It's strange because we’d been to No. 1 with the album. So now we wanted a No. 1 single because we'd never had one. So it was like, 'come on! come on!' When we got there, it was, as you can imagine, a 'yes!' moment." Hysteria is one of only a handful of albums that has charted seven singles or more on the US Hot 100: "Women" (No. 80), "Animal" (No. 19), "Hysteria" (No. 10), "Pour Some Sugar on Me" (No. 2), "Love Bites (No. 1), "Armageddon It" (No. 3), and "Rocket" (No. 12).

Def Leppard's fifth album, Adrenalize, was released on 31 March 1992. The first single, the anthemic "Let's Get Rocked", was an instant hit and remains the band's highest-charting song ever in several countries, including the UK (No. 2), Canada (No. 3), Australia (No. 6) and Germany (No. 22), while reaching No. 1 on the US Rock Tracks chart and No. 15 on the Billboard Hot 100. The band performed the song at the 1992 MTV Video Music Awards where it was nominated for Best Video of the Year.

On 23 October 1995, the band entered the Guinness Book of World Records by performing three concerts on three continents in one day (Tangiers, Morocco; Sheffield, England; and Vancouver, Canada).

On 5 September 2000, Def Leppard were inducted into Hollywood's RockWalk on Sunset Boulevard by their friend Brian May of Queen.

The band, along with Queen, Kiss, and Judas Priest, were the inaugural inductees of VH1 Rock Honors on 31 May 2006.

In 2010, Elliott criticised the British music press, which he accused of ignoring Def Leppard and narrowing popular taste:

It's nice to walk down Oxford Street without being recognised but then again when music magazines write about us they take the piss because we're not as cool as Johnny Marr, who isn't as successful as us by a million miles [...] Rock's ploughed its own furrow for 30 years but still music magazines don't give rock its due [...] How many more front covers do Paul McCartney and Morrissey need? Our album will sell more than Morrissey's so why don't we get the same kind of respect?"

Elliott is known for his distinctive and wide-ranging raspy vocals.

Elliott was inducted into the Rock and Roll Hall of Fame as a member of Def Leppard on 29 March 2019 at a ceremony at Brooklyn's Barclays Center. Def Leppard were inducted by Queen guitarist Brian May.

== Other work ==
Elliott has also been the lead singer of the David Bowie tribute band the Cybernauts and the Mott the Hoople cover band Down 'n' Outz.

At one time, Elliott co-owned a Sheffield sports bar with Tim Cranston, a Canadian former ice hockey player for the EIHL team Sheffield Steelers.

== Personal life ==
Elliott's first marriage was to Karla Ramdhani in 1989; they divorced in 1996. Elliott met Kristine Wunschel in 2003 while she was working on the crew for the X album tour, and they were married on 1 September 2004. Their first child was born in 2009, and daughters were born in 2016 and 2020.

Elliott is a supporter of Sheffield United.

== Discography ==
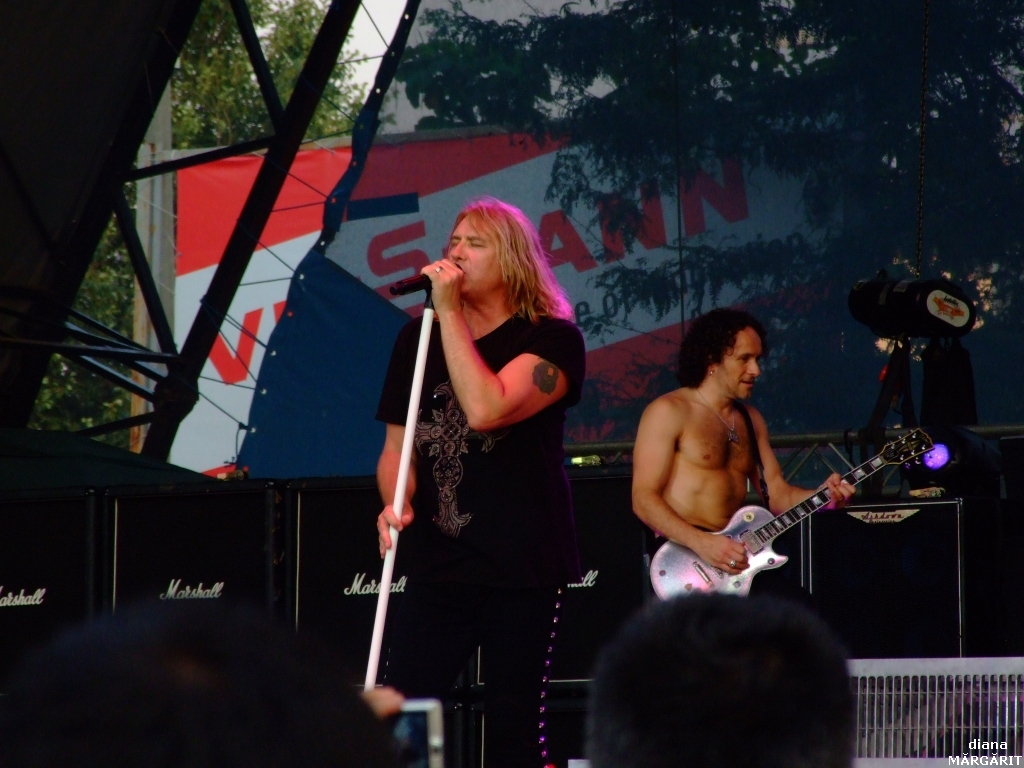
Elliott with Def Leppard in 2005

=== with Def Leppard ===
- On Through the Night (1980)
- High 'n' Dry (1981)
- Pyromania (1983)
- Hysteria (1987)
- Adrenalize (1992)
- Slang (1996)
- Euphoria (1999)
- X (2002)
- Yeah! (2006)
- Songs from the Sparkle Lounge (2008)
- Def Leppard (2015)
- Diamond Star Halos (2022)

=== with Cybernauts ===
- Cybernauts Live (2000)

=== with Down 'n' Outz ===
- My ReGeneration (2010)
- The Further Adventures Of... (2014)
- The Further Live Adventures Of... (2017)
- This Is How We Roll (2019)

=== with Kings of Chaos ===
- "Never Before" from the compilation album Re-Machined: A Tribute to Deep Purple's Machine Head (2012)

=== Soundtrack appearances ===
Title	Release	Other artist(s)	Soundtrack
"All The Young Dudes" (live)	2018	Queen, Ian Hunter, David Bowie, Mick Ronson, Phil Collen	Beside Bowie: The Mick Ronson Story soundtrack
"This Is For You"	2018		Beside Bowie: The Mick Ronson Story soundtrack
