= Def Leppard discography =

Cataloguing of published recordings by Def Leppard

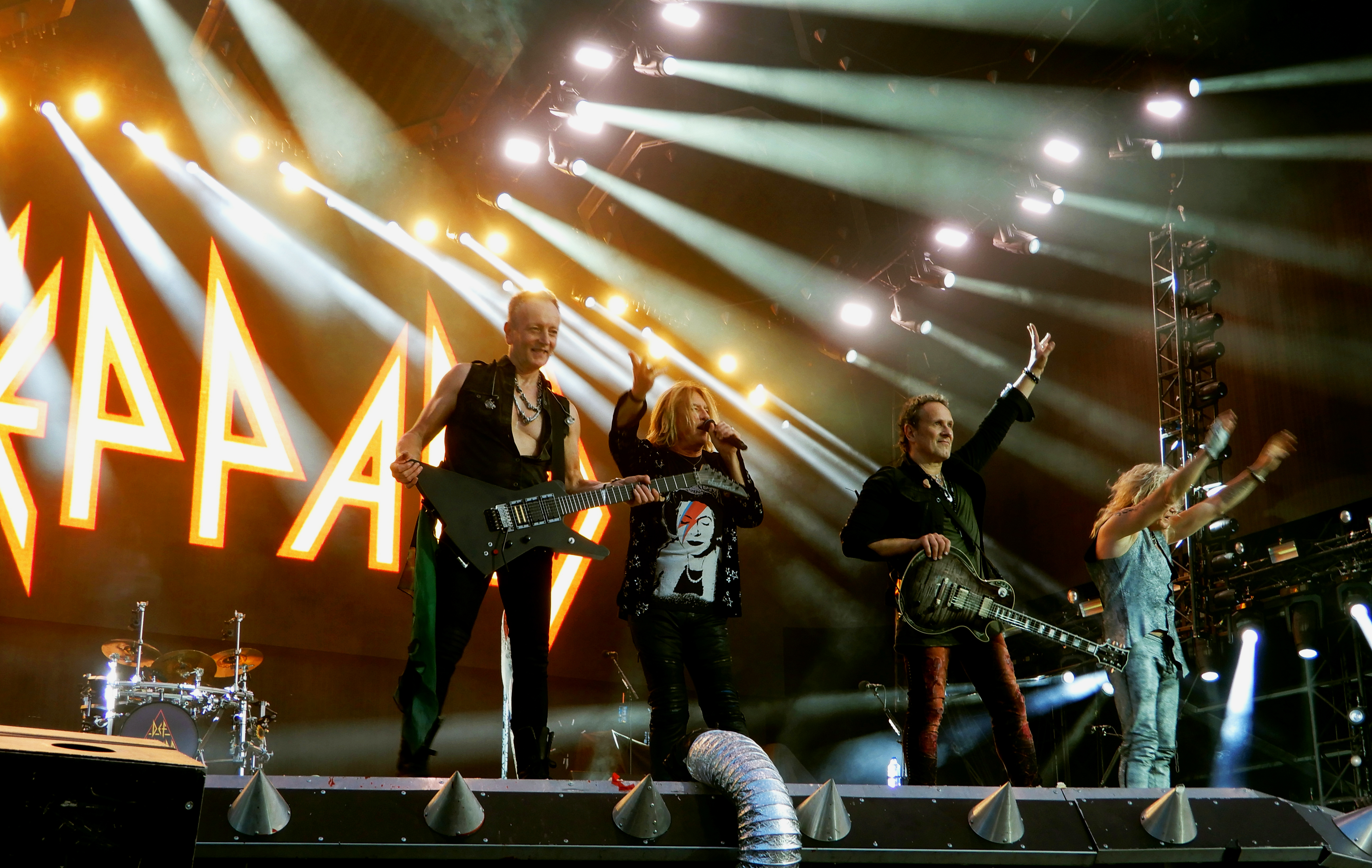
- Def Leppard performing at Hellfest in 2019
- Studio albums: 12
- Extended plays: 4
- Live albums: 6
- Compilation albums: 6
- Singles: 60
- Video albums: 11
- Music videos: 45

The English rock band Def Leppard have released 12 studio albums, six live albums, six compilation albums, and four extended plays. Def Leppard also have sold more than 100 million records worldwide, making them one of the best-selling music artists of all time.

Def Leppard was formed in 1977 by vocalist Joe Elliott, bass player Rick "Sav" Savage, guitarist Pete Willis, and drummer Tony Kenning. They later released the EP The Def Leppard E.P. in 1979. The band signed with Mercury Records and released their debut full-length album On Through the Night. The band's follow up was High 'n' Dry, which reached number 26 in the UK and was certified platinum two times in the United States. Their next album, titled Pyromania, would be their big breakthrough album and would later sell more than 10 million copies in the United States alone.

After touring in support of Pyromania, the band released Hysteria which topped the American and British album charts and is their best-selling album worldwide, selling more than 12 million copies in the United States alone and more than 25 million worldwide. Adrenalize, released in 1992, debuted at number one on the UK Album Chart and the US Billboard 200 and launched several successful singles, including "Let's Get Rocked" and "Make Love Like a Man" and went on to sell 8 million albums worldwide. In 1996, the band released its sixth studio album, Slang; while successful, the album could not reach the precedent set by Def Leppard's previous albums and was certified gold in the United States. After three years, Def Leppard released Euphoria, which is the band's last certified album by the RIAA, CRIA, and BPI.

At the start of the 21st century, the band released X. Four years later, Def Leppard released the studio/cover album, Yeah!, which included covers by Thin Lizzy and The Kinks. On 25 April 2008, the band released Songs from the Sparkle Lounge, which included the single "Nine Lives" featuring country singer Tim McGraw. The band released Mirrorball, its first live album, in 2011, which would be followed by another live album in 2013, Viva! Hysteria, featuring the Hysteria album played live in its entirety, from their Las Vegas residency at the Hard Rock Hotel. The band released a self-titled studio album on 30 October 2015. Seven years later, on 27 May 2022, Def Leppard released Diamond Star Halos.

In January 2022, it was announced that Primary Wave Music had acquired an "additional" stake in Def Leppard's music publishing catalog, as well as the band's master royalty income stream.

== Albums ==
=== Studio albums ===
Year	Album details	Peak chart positions										Sales	Certifications (sales thresholds)
Year	Album details	UK	AUS	CAN	FIN	GER	NOR	NZ	SWE	SWI	US	Sales	Certifications (sales thresholds)
1980	On Through the Night: Released: 14 March 1980; Label: Vertigo (MR #234321); Formats: CD, CS, LP	15	98	—	—	—	—	—	—	—	51		CAN: Platinum; US: Platinum
1981	High 'n' Dry: Released: 6 July 1981; Label: Vertigo (MR #818836-2); Formats: CD, CS, LP	26	—	—	—	—	—	—	31	—	38		CAN: Platinum; US: 2× Platinum
1983	Pyromania: Released: 20 January 1983; Label: Mercury (MR #810308-2); Formats: CD, CS, LP	18	70	4	—	20	—	26	23	45	2		UK: Silver; FRA: Gold; CAN: 7× Platinum; US: Diamond (10× Platinum)
1987	Hysteria: Released: 3 August 1987; Label: Mercury (MR #830675-2); Formats: CD, CS, LP	1	1	1	—	10	1	1	2	2	1		UK: 2× Platinum; AUS: 4× Platinum; NZ: Platinum; SWE: Gold; SWI: Platinum; CAN: Diamond (13× Platinum); US: Diamond (12× Platinum)
1992	Adrenalize: Released: 30 March 1992; Label: Mercury (MR #314-512185-2); Formats: CD, CS, LP	1	1	1	1	8	1	1	5	1	1		UK: Platinum; AUS: Platinum; FRA: Gold; SWE: Gold; SWI: Platinum; CAN: 4× Platinum; US: 3× Platinum
1996	Slang: Released: 14 May 1996; Label: Mercury (MR #532486); Formats: CD, CS, LP	5	11	12	13	34	25	14	5	19	14	US: 358,000	UK: Gold; CAN: Platinum; US: Gold
1999	Euphoria: Released: 8 June 1999; Label: Mercury (MR #546212); Formats: CD, CS, LP	11	59	32	16	14	30	—	7	14	11	US: 575,000	CAN: Gold; US: Gold
2002	X: Released: 30 July 2002; Label: Island (IR #063121); Formats: CD, CS, LP	14	49	12	33	19	19	—	15	9	11	US: 223,000	
2006	Yeah!: Released: 23 May 2006; Label: Mercury/Island (MR #9858285); Formats: CD, LP	52	95	13	—	73	—	—	25	57	16		
2008	Songs from the Sparkle Lounge: Released: 25 April 2008; Label: Mercury (MR #1766038); Formats: CD, LP	10	82	7	27	43	15	26	26	29	5		
2015	Def Leppard: Released: 30 October 2015; Label: Bludgeon Riffola/earMUSIC; Formats: CD, LP	11	4	11	32	10	15	17	11	2	10		
2022	Diamond Star Halos: Released: 27 May 2022; Label: Bludgeon Riffola/Mercury; Formats: CD, CS, LP	5	3	16	8	8	—	21	14	4	10		
"—" denotes releases that did not chart.

=== Compilation albums ===
Year	Album details	Peak chart positions											Certifications
Year	Album details	UK	AUS	BEL	CAN	FIN	GER	NOR	NZ	SWE	SWI	US	Certifications
1993	Retro Active: Released: 4 October 1993; Label: Mercury Records (MR #314-518305-2); Formats: CD, CS, LP	6	33	—	7	—	36	—	—	12	7	9	SWI: Gold; CAN: Platinum; US: Platinum
1995	Vault: Def Leppard Greatest Hits (1980–1995): Released: 23 October 1995; Label: Mercury Records (MR #528 6562); Formats: CD, CS, LP	3	9	30	7	7	31	7	2	10	7	15	UK: Platinum; CAN: 2× Platinum; US: 5× Platinum
2004	Best of Def Leppard: Released: 25 October 2004; Label: Mercury Records (MR #865493-91); Formats: CD, CS, LP	6	—	—	—	—	—	7	—	19	76	—	UK: Platinum
2005	Rock of Ages: The Definitive Collection: Released: 17 May 2005; Label: Mercury Records (MR #000464702); Formats: CD, LP	—	81	—	3	—	—	—	11	—	—	10	NZ: Gold; CAN: 2× Platinum; US: Platinum
2018	The Story So Far – The Best Of: Released: 30 November 2018; Label: Bludgeon Riffola; Formats: CD, LP	32	71	150	61	—	—	—	—	—	54	101	UK: Gold
2023	Drastic Symphonies: Released: 19 May 2023; Label: Mercury; Formats: CD, CS, LP	4	46	—	—	—	17	—	—	—	10	54	
" — " denotes releases that did not chart.

=== Live albums ===
Year	Album details	Peak chart positions							Certifications
Year	Album details	UK	AUS	BEL	CAN	GER	SWI	US	Certifications
2011	Mirror Ball – Live & More: Released: 3 June 2011; Label: Mercury Records; Formats: CD, LP; Recorded: 2008–2011	44	80	—	15	46	51	16	US: Gold
2013	Viva! Hysteria: Released: 22 October 2013; Label: Frontiers Records (Universal); Formats: CD, DVD, Blu-ray, MP3; Recorded: 29–30 March 2013	73	—	81	28	28	81	24	
2017	And There Will Be a Next Time... Live from Detroit: Released: 20 February 2017; Label: Frontiers Records (Universal); Formats: CD, DVD, Blu-ray, MP3; Recorded: 15 July 2016	—	—	—	—	—	—	—	
2020	London to Vegas: Released: 29 May 2020; Label: Eagle Rock Ent; Formats: CD, DVD; Recorded: 2019	—	—	—	—	25	40	—	
2024	One Night Only: Live at the Leadmill: Released: 11 October 2024; Label: Mercury; Formats: CD+BD, CD+DVD, LP, digital, streaming; Recorded: 19 May 2023	—	—	—	—	—	—	—	
2025	Diamond Star Heroes: Live from Sheffield: Released: 21 November 2025; Label: Mercury; Formats: CD+BD, CD+DVD, LP, digital, streaming; Recorded: 22 May 2023	2	—	—	—	60	23	—	
" — " denotes releases that did not chart.

=== Deluxe editions and box sets ===
Year	Title	Content included
2006	Hysteria Deluxe Edition: Released: 16 October 2006; 2 CDs, 27 tracks	Hysteria; Hysteria singles b-sides
2009	Pyromania Deluxe Edition: Released: 8 June 2009; 2 CDs, 25 tracks	Pyromania; Live at the L.A. Forum 1983
2009	Adrenalize Deluxe Edition: Released: 8 June 2009; 2 CDs, 24 tracks	Adrenalize; In the Clubs... In Your Face live 1988; Adrenalize singles b-sides
2014	Slang Deluxe Edition: Released: 10 February 2014; 2 CDs, 30 tracks (8 additional digital tracks)	Slang; Demos & b-sides
2017	Hysteria 30th Anniversary Edition: Released: 4 August 2017; 5 CDs, 48 tracks, 2 DVDs	Hysteria; Hysteria remixes & b-sides Live: In the Round, in Your Face (live in Denver, Colorado, February 1988) (CD); Classic Albums – Hysteria (DVD); Hysteria music videos (DVD)
2018	The Collection: Volume One: Released: 1 June 2018; 7 CDs/9 LPs, 71 tracks	On Through the Night; High 'n' Dry; Pyromania; Hysteria; Live at the L.A. Forum 1983; Rarities Volume One; The Def Leppard E.P.
2018	Hysteria – The Singles: Released: 30 November 2018; 10 7”s, 20 tracks	"Women" / "Tear it Down" "Animal" / "I Wanna Be Your Hero" "Hysteria" / "Ride into the Sun" "Pour Some Sugar on Me" / "Ring of Fire" "Love Bites" / "Billy's Got a Gun" (live) "Armageddon It" / "Release Me" "Rocket" / "Women" (live) "Excitable" / "Run Riot" "Love and Affection" / "Don't Shoot Shotgun" "Animal" / "Tear it Down"
2019	The Collection: Volume Two: Released: 21 June 2019; 7 CDs/10 LPs, 86 tracks	Adrenalize; Retro Active; Slang; Euphoria; Rarities Volume Two; Rarities Volume Three; Rarities Volume Four^{[†]}
2020	The Early Years 79–81: Released: 20 March 2020; 5 CDs, 64 tracks	On Through the Night; High 'n' Dry; When the Walls Came Tumbling Down – Live in Oxford 26/04/1980; Too Many Jitterbugs – B-Sides and Rarities; Raw – Early BBC Recordings
2021	The Collection: Volume Three: Released: 11 June 2021; 6 CDs/9 LPs, 77 tracks	X Yeah! Songs from the Sparkle Lounge; B-Sides; Yeah! II (bonus album of cover songs); Yeah! Live! (live album of cover songs)
2024	Pyromania: 40th Anniversary Super Deluxe Edition: Released: 26 April 2024; 4 CDs, 53 tracks, 1 Blu-ray disc	Pyromania; Outtakes, Demoes and Rough Mixes; Live Westfalen Halle, Dortmund, Germany 1983; Live at the L.A. Forum 1983; Dolby Atmos, 5.1 Audio, PCM Stereo and instrumental mixes of Pyromania and music videos (Blu-ray disc)
2026	The Collection: Volume Four: Released: 13 November 2026; 6 CDs/11 LPs, 85 tracks	Def Leppard; Diamond Star Halos; Drastic Symphonies; The Rarities: Part I The Rarities: Part II; The Rarities: Part III (Yeah! 4)^{[†]}

- † CD version only, all of the tracks on Rarities Volume Four are included in the LP version of Rarities Volume Three.
- † CD version only, all of the tracks on The Rarities: Part III (Yeah! 4) are included in the LP version of The Rarities: Part II.

== Extended plays ==
Year	Title
1979	The Def Leppard E.P.: Released: January 1979; Label: Bludgeon-Riffola (BR #SRTS/78/CUS/232); Format: LP, single, digital download
2018	The Lost Session: Released: 19 January 2018; Label: Bludgeon Riffola; Format: Digital download
2018	Live at Abbey Road Studios: Released: 21 April 2018; Label: Bludgeon Riffola; Format: LP, single
2020	Rock & Roll Hall Of Fame 29March2019: Released: 29 August 2020; Label: Bludgeon Riffola; Format: LP, Record Store Day exclusive

== Singles ==
=== 1979–1989 ===
Year	Single	Peak chart positions										Certifications	Album
Year	Single	UK	AUS	CAN	GER	IRE	NZ	SWE	SWI	US	US Main	Certifications	Album
1979	"Wasted"	61	—	—	—	—	—	—	—	—	—		On Through the Night
1980	"Hello America"	45	—	—	—	—	—	—	—	—	—		On Through the Night
1980	"Rock Brigade"	—	—	—	—	—	—	—	—	— (Note: "Rock Brigade" did not enter the Billboard Hot 100, but peaked at number six on the Bubbling Under Hot 100 Singles chart.)	—		On Through the Night
1981	"Let It Go"	76	—	—	—	—	—	—	—	—	34		High 'n' Dry
1981	"Bringin' On the Heartbreak"	—	—	—	—	—	—	—	—	—	—		High 'n' Dry
1983	"Photograph"	66	—	32	—	—	—	—	—	12	1		Pyromania
1983	"Rock of Ages"	41	96	24	—	—	—	—	—	16	1		Pyromania
1983	"Foolin'": b/w "Comin' Under Fire" [airplay]	— —	— —	39 —	— —	— —	— —	— —	— —	28 —	9; 24		Pyromania
1983	"Billy's Got a Gun" [airplay]	—	—	—	—	—	—	—	—	—	33		Pyromania
1983	"Action! Not Words" [airplay]	—	—	—	—	—	—	—	—	—	42		Pyromania
1983	"Too Late for Love"	86	—	—	—	—	—	—	—	—	9		Pyromania
1984	"Bringin' On the Heartbreak" (Remix)	—	—	61	—	—	—	—	—	61	—		High 'n' Dry
1987	"Animal"	6	46	21	—	3	8	—	17	19	5	UK: Silver; NZ: Gold	Hysteria
1987	"Women"	—	100	—	—	—	—	—	—	80	7		Hysteria
1987	"Pour Some Sugar on Me"	18	26	22	50	8	16	—	—	2	25	UK: Platinum; NZ: 3× Platinum; US: Gold	Hysteria
1987	"Hysteria"	26	77	13	—	19	—	—	—	10	9	UK: Silver; NZ: Platinum	Hysteria
1988	"Armageddon It"	20	34	8	—	11	2	—	—	3	3		Hysteria
1988	"Love Bites"	11	21	6	—	7	2	—	—	1	3	NZ: Platinum	Hysteria
1989	"Rocket"	15	15	14	—	5	5	—	—	12	5		Hysteria

=== 1992–2000 ===
Year	Single	Peak chart positions										Certifications	Album
Year	Single	UK	AUS	CAN	GER	IRE	NZ	SWE	SWI	US	US Main	Certifications	Album
1992	"Let's Get Rocked"	2	6	3	22	4	7	18	3	15	1	AUS: Gold	Adrenalize
1992	"Make Love Like a Man"	12	22	23	95	10	26	—	40	36	3		Adrenalize
1992	"Have You Ever Needed Someone So Bad": b/w "Elected" [airplay]	16 —	44 —	7 —	— —	24 —	49 —	— —	— —	12 —	7; 22		Adrenalize
1992	"Stand Up (Kick Love into Motion)"	—	55	11	—	—	—	—	—	34	1		Adrenalize
1993	"Heaven Is"	13	—	—	—	24	—	—	—	—	—		Adrenalize
1993	"Tonight"	34	—	50	—	—	—	—	—	62	13		Adrenalize
1993	"I Wanna Touch U" [US promo]	—	—	—	—	—	—	—	—	—	—		Adrenalize
1993	"Two Steps Behind"	32	33	5	66	26	34	21	—	12	5		Retro Active
1993	"Desert Song" [US promo]	—	—	—	—	—	—	—	—	—	12		Retro Active
1993	"Miss You in a Heartbeat"	—	—	19	—	—	—	—	—	39	—		Retro Active
1994	"Action"	14	—	—	—	19	—	—	—	—	—		Retro Active
1995	"When Love & Hate Collide"	2	22	6	67	1	27	—	36	58	—	UK: Silver	Vault: Def Leppard Greatest Hits (1980–1995)
1996	"Slang"	17	90	30	—	—	—	57	—	—	—		Slang
1996	"Work It Out"	22	43	10	—	—	—	—	—	—	6		Slang
1996	"All I Want Is Everything"	38	—	14	—	—	—	—	—	—	—		Slang
1996	"Breathe a Sigh"	43	—	41	—	—	—	—	—	—	—		Slang
1999	"Promises": b/w "Back in Your Face"	41	—	18	—	—	—	—	—	— (Note: "Promises" did not enter the Billboard Hot 100, but peaked at number two on the Bubbling Under Hot 100 Singles chart.)	1		Euphoria
1999	"Paper Sun" [airplay]	—	—	—	—	—	—	—	—	—	11		Euphoria
1999	"Goodbye"	54	—	—	—	—	—	—	—	—	—		Euphoria
2000	"Day After Day" [US tour promo disc]	—	—	—	—	—	—	—	—	—	22		Euphoria
2000	"21st Century Sha La La La Girl" [US tour promo disc]	—	—	—	—	—	—	—	—	—	—		Euphoria

=== 2002–2026 ===
Year	Single	Peak chart positions									Certifications	Album
Year	Single	UK	CAN	GER	IRE	SWE	SWI	US Hard Rock Digi.	US Heri.	US Main	Certifications	Album
2002	"Now"	23	29	72	37	57	84	—	6	26		X
2002	"Four Letter Word" [US promo]	—	—	—	—	—	—	—	4	30		X
2003	"Long, Long Way to Go"	40	—	—	—	—	—	—	—	—		X
2005	"No Matter What"	—	—	—	—	—	—	—	28	—		Yeah!
2006	"Rock On" [US radio promo]	—	—	—	—	—	—	—	18	18		Yeah!
2006	"20th Century Boy"	—	33	—	—	—	—	—	—	—		Yeah!
2008	"Nine Lives"	—	38	—	—	—	—	—	12	—		Songs from the Sparkle Lounge
2008	"C'mon C'mon"	—	—	—	—	—	—	—	—	—		Songs from the Sparkle Lounge
2011	"Undefeated"	—	—	—	—	—	—	—	26	—		Mirror Ball – Live & More
2012	"It's All About Believin'"	—	—	—	—	—	—	—	—	—		Mirror Ball – Live & More
2015	"Let's Go"	—	—	—	—	—	—	—	—	—		Def Leppard
2016	"Dangerous"	—	—	—	—	—	—	—	—	—		Def Leppard
2016	"Man Enough"	—	—	—	—	—	—	—	—	—		Def Leppard
2016	"We Belong"	—	—	—	—	—	—	—	—	—		Def Leppard
2018	"Personal Jesus"	—	—	—	—	—	—	—	—	—		The Story So Far – The Best Of
2018	"We All Need Christmas"	—	—	—	—	—	—	—	—	—		The Story So Far – The Best Of
2022	"Kick"	— (Note: "Kick" did not enter the UK Singles Chart, but peaked at number 47 on the UK Singles Sales Chart.)	—	—	—	—	—	3	—	34		Diamond Star Halos
2022	"Take What You Want"	—	—	—	—	—	—	7	—	—		Diamond Star Halos
2022	"Fire It Up”	—	—	—	—	—	—	20	—	—		Diamond Star Halos
2023	"Animal"	— (Note: "Animal" did not enter the UK Singles Chart, but peaked at number 55 on the UK Singles Sales Chart.)	—	—	—	—	—	—	—	—		Drastic Symphonies
2024	"Just Like '73"	— (Note: "Just Like 73" did not enter the UK Singles Chart, but peaked at number 20 on the UK Singles Sales Chart.)	—	—	—	—	—	9	—	—		Non-album single
2025	"Stand by Me"	— (Note: "Stand By Me" did not enter the UK Singles Chart, but peaked at number 94 on the UK Singles Sales Chart.)	—	—	—	—	—	—	—	—		Non-album single
2026	"Rejoice"	— (Note: "Rejoice" did not enter the UK Singles Chart, but peaked at number 58 on the UK Singles Sales Chart.)	—	—	—	—	—	2	—	—		TBA

== Videos ==
Year	Title
1988	Historia: Label: Universal Music (UM #459772); Format: VHS, LD, DVD
1989	Live: In the Round, in Your Face: Label: Universal Music (UM #23543); Format: VHS, LD, DVD
1993	Visualize: Label: Universal Music (UM #454-23322); Format: VHS, LD, DVD
1995	Video Archive: Label: Universal Music (UM #453754); Format: VHS, LD, VCD, DVD
2004	Best of the Videos: Label: Universal Music (UM #3494522); Format: DVD
2005	Rock of Ages: The DVD Collection: Label: Island Records (IR #5653-564); Format: DVD
2009	CMT Crossroads – Taylor Swift & Def Leppard: Label: Big Machine Records; Format: DVD
2013	Viva! Hysteria: Label: Frontiers Records; Format: DVD, Blu-ray, digital download
2017	And There Will Be a Next Time... Live from Detroit: Label: Frontiers Records; Format: DVD, Blu-ray, digital download
2020	London to Vegas: Label: Eagle Rock Entertainment; Format: DVD, Blu-ray
2024	One Night Only: Live at the Leadmill: Label: Mercury; Format: DVD, Blu-ray

== Music videos ==
Year	Title	Director	Ref.
1979	"Wasted"		
1980	"Hello America"		
1980	"Rock Brigade"		
1981	"Let It Go"	Doug Smith	
1981	"High 'n' Dry (Saturday Night)"	Doug Smith	
1981	"Bringin' on the Heartbreak" (version 1)	Doug Smith	
1983	"Photograph"	David Mallet	
1983	"Rock of Ages"	David Mallet	
1983	"Foolin'"	David Mallet	
1983	"Too Late for Love"	Mike Mansfield	
1984	"Rock! Rock! (Till You Drop)"	Kinichi Nakae	
1984	"Bringin' on the Heartbreak" (version 2)	David Mallet	
1984	"Me and My Wine"	David Mallet	
1987	"Women"	Jean Pellerin & Doug Freel	
1987	"Animal"	Jean Pellerin & Doug Freel	
1987	"Pour Some Sugar on Me" (version 1)	Russell Mulcahy	
1987	"Hysteria"	Jean Pellerin & Doug Freel	
1988	"Pour Some Sugar on Me" (version 2)	Wayne Isham	
1988	"Armageddon It"	Wayne Isham	
1988	"Love Bites"	Jean Pellerin & Doug Freel	
1988	"Rocket"	Nigel Dick	
1992	"Let's Get Rocked"	Steve Barron	
1992	"Make Love Like a Man"	Wayne Isham	
1992	"Have You Ever Needed Someone So Bad?"	Wayne Isham	
1992	"Stand Up (Kick Love into Motion)"	Matt Mahurin	
1993	"Heaven Is"	Charlie Watson	
1993	"Tonight"	Josh Taft	
1993	"I Wanna Touch U"	Phil Tuckett	
1993	"Two Steps Behind (acoustic)"	Wayne Isham	
1993	"Two Steps Behind (electric)"	Wayne Isham	
1993	"Miss You in Heartbeat"	Phil Tuckett	
1993	"Action"	Phil Tuckett	
1995	"When Love & Hate Collide"	Jean Pellerin & Doug Freel	
1996	"Slang"	Nigel Dick	
1996	"Work It Out"	Nigel Dick	
1996	"All I Want Is Everything"	Matt Mahurin	
1999	"Promises"	Wayne Isham	
1999	"Goodbye"	Dave Meyers	
2002	"Now"	The Malloys	
2003	"Long, Long Way to Go"	Clive Arrowsmith	
2005	"No Matter What"	John Logsdon	
2006	"Rock On"		
2008	"Nine Lives"	Sherman Halsey	
2008	"C'mon C'mon"	Matthew Mulholland; Jonathan Beswick	
2015	"Let's Go"		
2016	"Dangerous"		
2016	"Man Enough"	Frank Gryner	
2016	"We Belong"		
2018	"Personal Jesus"		
2018	"We All Need Christmas"		
2022	"Kick"	Anuk Rohde	
2022	"Fire It Up"	Dylan Hayes	
2025	"Stand by Me"		

== Personnel ==
Album	Year	Vocals	Guitar		Bass	Drums	Producer
The Def Leppard E.P.	1979	Joe Elliott	Pete Willis	Steve Clark	Rick Savage	Frank Noon	Def Leppard
On Through the Night	1980	Joe Elliott	Pete Willis	Steve Clark	Rick Savage	Rick Allen	Tom Allom
High 'N' Dry	1981	Joe Elliott	Pete Willis	Steve Clark	Rick Savage	Rick Allen	Mutt Lange
Pyromania	1983	Joe Elliott	Phil Collen	Steve Clark	Rick Savage	Rick Allen	Mutt Lange
Hysteria	1987	Joe Elliott	Phil Collen	Steve Clark	Rick Savage	Rick Allen	Mutt Lange
Adrenalize	1992	Joe Elliott	Phil Collen	-	Rick Savage	Rick Allen	Mike Shipley, Def Leppard
Slang	1996	Joe Elliott	Phil Collen	Vivian Campbell	Rick Savage	Rick Allen	Pete Woodroffe, Def Leppard
Euphoria	1999	Joe Elliott	Phil Collen	Vivian Campbell	Rick Savage	Rick Allen	Pete Woodroffe, Def Leppard
X	2002	Joe Elliott	Phil Collen	Vivian Campbell	Rick Savage	Rick Allen	Pete Woodroffe, Def Leppard
Yeah!	2006	Joe Elliott	Phil Collen	Vivian Campbell	Rick Savage	Rick Allen	Def Leppard
Songs from the Sparkle Lounge	2008	Joe Elliott	Phil Collen	Vivian Campbell	Rick Savage	Rick Allen	Ronan McHugh, Def Leppard
Def Leppard	2015	Joe Elliott	Phil Collen	Vivian Campbell	Rick Savage	Rick Allen	Ronan McHugh, Def Leppard
Diamond Star Halos	2022	Joe Elliott	Phil Collen	Vivian Campbell	Rick Savage	Rick Allen	Ronan McHugh, Def Leppard

== See also ==
- List of glam metal albums and songs
