= The Story So Far – The Best Of =

2018 greatest hits album by Def Leppard

Greatest hits album by Def Leppard
- Released: 30 November 2018
- Recorded: 1981–2018
- Genres: Glam metal; hard rock; pop rock
- Length: 2:34:19
- Labels: Bludgeon Riffola; Universal Music Catalogue

Def Leppard chronology
And There Will Be a Next Time... Live from Detroit (2017)	The Story So Far – The Best Of (2018)	The Early Years 79–81 (2020)

The Story So Far – The Best Of is a greatest hits album by the English rock band Def Leppard. The album has a similar track listing to previous compilations; however it is the first to include tracks from the band's recent studio efforts Songs from the Sparkle Lounge (2008) and Def Leppard (2015) as well as all three studio tracks from Mirror Ball – Live & More (2011).

== Content ==
The album includes all tracks from their first greatest hits album Vault: Def Leppard Greatest Hits (1980–1995) (1995) with the exception of "Miss You in a Heartbeat".

Unlike the three previous greatest hits releases Vault, Best of Def Leppard (2004) and Rock of Ages: The Definitive Collection (2005), The Story So Far – The Best Of features the Hysteria album versions of the songs "Pour Some Sugar on Me" and "Rocket".

== Track listing ==
Disc one
No.	Title	Writer(s)	Origin	Length
1.	"Animal"	Steve Clark; Phil Collen; Joe Elliott; Robert John "Mutt" Lange; Rick Savage	Hysteria, 1987	4:04
2.	"Photograph"	Clark; Elliott; Lange; Savage; Pete Willis	Pyromania, 1983	4:08
3.	"Pour Some Sugar on Me"	Clark; Collen; Elliott; Lange; Savage	Hysteria	4:28
4.	"Love Bites"	Clark; Collen; Elliott; Lange; Savage	Hysteria	5:47
5.	"Let's Get Rocked"	Collen; Elliott; Lange; Savage	Adrenalize, 1992	4:56
6.	"Armageddon It"	Clark; Collen; Elliott; Lange; Savage	Hysteria	5:22
7.	"Foolin'"	Clark; Elliott; Lange	Pyromania	4:34
8.	"Two Steps Behind"	Elliott	Retro Active and Last Action Hero, 1993	4:19
9.	"Heaven Is"	Clark; Collen; Elliott; Lange; Savage	Adrenalize	3:34
10.	"Rocket"	Clark; Collen; Elliott; Lange; Savage	Hysteria	6:36
11.	"Hysteria"	Clark; Collen; Elliott; Lange; Savage	Hysteria	5:56
12.	"Have You Ever Needed Someone So Bad"	Collen; Elliott; Lange	Adrenalize	5:23
13.	"Make Love Like a Man"	Clark; Collen; Elliott; Lange	Adrenalize	4:15
14.	"Action" (Sweet cover)	Brian Connolly; Steve Priest; Andy Scott; Mick Tucker	Retro Active	3:41
15.	"When Love & Hate Collide"	Elliott; Savage	Vault: Def Leppard Greatest Hits (1980–1995), 1995	4:17
16.	"Rock of Ages"	Clark; Elliott; Lange	Pyromania	4:08
17.	"Personal Jesus" (Remix) (Depeche Mode cover) (CD and digital bonus track)	Martin Gore	Spotify Singles, 2018	3:53

Disc two
No.	Title	Writer(s)	Origin	Length
1.	"Let's Go"	Elliott; Savage	Def Leppard, 2015	5:01
2.	"Promises"	Collen; Lange	Euphoria, 1999	3:59
3.	"Slang"	Collen; Elliott	Slang, 1996	2:39
4.	"Bringin' On the Heartbreak"	Clark; Elliott; Willis	High 'n' Dry, 1981	4:33
5.	"Rock On" (Radio Remix) (David Essex cover)	Essex	Yeah!, 2006	2:53
6.	"Nine Lives" (featuring Tim McGraw)	Collen; Elliott; McGraw; Savage	Songs from the Sparkle Lounge, 2008	3:32
7.	"Work It Out"	Vivian Campbell	Slang	4:49
8.	"Stand Up (Kick Love into Motion)"	Clark; Collen; Elliott; Lange	Adrenalize	4:33
9.	"Dangerous"	Collen; Elliott	Def Leppard	3:26
10.	"Now"	Rick Allen; Campbell; Collen; Elliott; Marti Frederiksen; Savage	X, 2002	3:58
11.	"Undefeated"	Elliott	Mirror Ball – Live & More, 2011	4:40
12.	"Tonight"	Clark; Collen; Elliott; Lange; Savage	Adrenalize	4:03
13.	"C'mon C'mon"	Savage	Songs from the Sparkle Lounge	4:09
14.	"Man Enough"	Collen; Elliott	Def Leppard	3:54
15.	"No Matter What" (Badfinger cover)	Pete Ham	Yeah!	2:53
16.	"All I Want Is Everything"	Elliott	Slang	5:28
17.	"It's All About Believin'"	Collen; Jeffrey Lynn Vanston	Mirror Ball – Live & More	4:22
18.	"Kings of the World"	Savage	Mirror Ball – Live & More	6:12

Vinyl bonus single
No.	Title	Writer(s)	Origin	Length
1.	"We All Need Christmas" (with "Personal Jesus" (Remix) as the A-side)	Savage	Previously unreleased	3:57

Notes

- The album was released under two CD configurations: a single-disc edition and a deluxe two-disc edition.
- The initial pressings of the vinyl version of the album (the songs from disc one), that were bought online, also included "Personal Jesus" (Remix) b/w "We All Need Christmas" as a bonus 7" vinyl single.
- "We All Need Christmas" was also released as a stand-alone single for digital purchasing and streaming platforms on 12 October 2018.
- On Record Store Day 13 April 2019, the band released volume two of the album (disc two of the CD version).

== Charts ==
=== Weekly charts ===
Chart (2018–2019)	Peak position
Australian Albums (ARIA)	71
Belgian Albums (Ultratop Flanders)	150
Belgian Albums (Ultratop Wallonia)	183
Canadian Albums (Billboard)	61
Irish Albums (IRMA)	48
Japanese Albums (Oricon)	84
Scottish Albums (Official Charts)	27
Spanish Albums (PROMUSICAE)	66
Swiss Albums (Schweizer Hitparade)	54
UK Albums (Official Charts)	32
US Billboard 200	101
US Top Rock Albums (Billboard)	15

=== Year-end charts ===
Chart (2019)	Position
US Top Rock Albums (Billboard)	61
Chart (2020)	Position
US Top Rock Albums (Billboard)	71

== Certifications ==
Region	Certification	Certified units/sales
United Kingdom (BPI)	Gold	100,000^{‡}
^{‡} Sales+streaming figures based on certification alone.
