= Visualize =

- DVD cover, bundled with Video Archive

Video by Def Leppard
- Released: 5 October 1993 (VHS/LD); 2001 (DVD)
- Recorded: 1992–1993
- Genre: Glam metal; hard rock; pop rock
- Length: 87 minutes
- Label: Universal

Def Leppard video chronology
Live: In the Round, in Your Face (1989)	Visualize (1993)	Video Archive (1995)

Visualize is a video release by Def Leppard. A compilation of promo videos, interviews and concert footage. On DVD, it is bundled with Video Archive. It won the 1993 Metal Edge Readers' Choice Award for "Best Home Video."

The video was released on DVD in 2001, bundled with the 1995 compilation release Video Archive.

== Track listing ==
No.	Title	Writer(s)	From album	Length
1.	"Opening Statements and Titles"
2.	"Rocket" (music video)	Steve Clark; Phil Collen; Joe Elliott; Robert John "Mutt" Lange; Rick Savage	Hysteria (1987)
3.	"Switch 625" (Steve Clark Tribute)	Clark	High 'n' Dry (1981)
4.	"Solo Projects / Making Videos"
5.	"Let's Get Rocked" (music video)	Collen; Elliott; Lange; Savage	Adrenalize (1992)
6.	"Vivian Campbell Joins Def Leppard"
7.	"Make Love Like a Man" (music video)	Clark; Collen; Elliott; Lange	Adrenalize
8.	"I Wanna Touch U" (music video)	Rick Allen; Clark; Collen; Elliott; Lange	Adrenalize
9.	"Have You Ever Needed Someone So Bad" (music video)	Collen; Elliott; Lange	Adrenalize
10.	"Interviews"
11.	"Tonight" (music video)	Clark; Collen; Elliott; Lange; Savage	Adrenalize
12.	"Heaven Is" (music video)	Clark; Collen; Elliott; Lange; Savage	Adrenalize
13.	"Fans / Off Stage Life"
14.	"Stand Up (Kick Love into Motion)" (music video)	Clark; Collen; Elliott; Lange	Adrenalize
15.	"Return to Sheffield"
16.	"Two Steps Behind" (Live in Sheffield)	Elliott
17.	"Love Bites" (Live in Sheffield)	Clark; Collen; Elliott; Lange; Savage
18.	"Photograph" (Live in Sheffield)	Clark; Elliott; Lange; Savage; Pete Willis
19.	"The Future of Def Leppard"

== Certifications ==
Region	Certification	Certified units/sales
Canada (Music Canada)	Gold	5,000^{^}
United States (RIAA)	Gold	50,000^{^}
^{^} Shipments figures based on certification alone.
