= Rock of Ages: The Definitive Collection =

Greatest hits album by Def Leppard
- Released: 17 May 2005
- Recorded: 1979–2005
- Genre: Glam metal
- Length: 2:34:52
- Label: Bludgeon Riffola/Mercury/Island

Def Leppard chronology
Best of Def Leppard (2004)	Rock of Ages: The Definitive Collection (2005)	Yeah! (2006)

Professional ratings
Review scores
Source	Rating
Allmusic	4.5/5 stars
Rolling Stone	4.5/5 stars

Rock of Ages: The Definitive Collection is the North American version of the second compilation album by the English rock band Def Leppard. The two-disc anthology featuring 35 hit songs by the band and was released in North America on 17 May 2005. The album charted at No. 10 on the Billboard 200.

== Release ==
Its worldwide release equivalent, Best of Def Leppard, has a slightly different track listing, different artwork, different "previously unreleased" song and was released on 25 October 2004.

This is the only Def Leppard hits compilation (as of now) that features the full-length version of "Bringin' On the Heartbreak" that fades into the instrumental "Switch 625" .

Originally released only in North America, Rock of Ages was released in Europe on 28 January 2008.

== Track listing ==
Disc one
No.	Title	Writer(s)	Origin	Length
1.	"Pour Some Sugar on Me" (Historia video version)	Steve Clark; Phil Collen; Joe Elliott; Robert John "Mutt" Lange; Rick Savage	Hysteria, 1987	4:52
2.	"Photograph"	Clark; Elliott; Lange; Savage; Pete Willis	Pyromania, 1983	4:08
3.	"Love Bites"	Clark; Collen; Elliott; Lange; Savage	Hysteria	5:47
4.	"Let's Get Rocked"	Collen; Elliott; Lange; Savage	Adrenalize, 1992	4:56
5.	"Two Steps Behind" (Acoustic version)	Elliott	Retro Active and Last Action Hero, 1993	4:19
6.	"Animal"	Clark; Collen; Elliott; Lange; Savage	Hysteria	4:03
7.	"Heaven Is"	Clark; Collen; Elliott; Lange; Savage	Adrenalize	3:34
8.	"Foolin'"	Clark; Elliott; Lange	Pyromania	4:34
9.	"Rocket" (Visualize video version)	Clark; Collen; Elliott; Lange; Savage	Hysteria	4:07
10.	"When Love & Hate Collide"	Elliott; Savage	Vault: Def Leppard Greatest Hits (1980–1995), 1995	4:17
11.	"Armageddon It"	Clark; Collen; Elliott; Lange; Savage	Hysteria	5:22
12.	"Have You Ever Needed Someone So Bad"	Collen; Elliott; Lange	Adrenalize	5:19
13.	"Rock of Ages"	Clark; Elliott; Lange	Pyromania	4:08
14.	"Hysteria"	Clark; Collen; Elliott; Lange; Savage	Hysteria	5:56
15.	"Miss You in a Heartbeat" (Acoustic version)	Collen	Retro Active	4:04
16.	"Bringin' On the Heartbreak"	Clark; Elliott; Willis	High 'n' Dry, 1981	4:33
17.	"Switch 625" (Instrumental)	Clark	High 'n' Dry	3:23

Disc two
No.	Title	Writer(s)	Origin	Length
1.	"Rock! Rock! (Till You Drop)"	Clark; Elliott; Lange; Savage	Pyromania	3:55
2.	"Let It Go"	Clark; Elliott; Willis	High 'n' Dry	4:44
3.	"High 'n' Dry (Saturday Night)"	Clark; Elliott; Savage	High 'n' Dry	3:44
4.	"Too Late for Love"	Clark; Elliott; Lange; Savage; Willis	Pyromania	4:29
5.	"No Matter What"	Pete Ham	New song; later released on Yeah!, 2006	2:53
6.	"Promises"	Collen; Lange	Euphoria, 1999	3:59
7.	"Mirror, Mirror (Look into My Eyes)"	Clark; Elliott	High 'n' Dry	4:07
8.	"Women"	Clark; Collen; Elliott; Lange; Savage	Hysteria	5:42
9.	"Another Hit and Run"	Elliott; Savage	High 'n' Dry	4:59
10.	"Slang"	Collen; Elliott	Slang, 1996	2:39
11.	"Stand Up (Kick Love into Motion)"	Clark; Collen; Elliott; Lange	Adrenalize	4:33
12.	"Rock Brigade"	Clark; Elliott; Savage	On Through the Night, 1980	3:11
13.	"Now"	Rick Allen; Vivian Campbell; Collen; Elliott; Marti Frederiksen; Savage	X, 2002	3:58
14.	"Paper Sun"	Campbell; Collen; Savage; Pete Woodroffe	Euphoria	5:27
15.	"Work It Out"	Campbell	Slang	4:49
16.	"Die Hard the Hunter"	Clark; Elliott; Lange; Savage	Pyromania	6:17
17.	"Wasted"	Clark; Elliott	On Through the Night	3:44
18.	"Billy's Got a Gun" (Edited version)	Clark; Elliott; Lange; Savage; Willis	Pyromania	5:00

== Charts ==
=== Weekly charts ===
2005 weekly chart performance for Rock of Ages: The Definitive Collection
Chart (2005)	Peak position
Canadian Albums (Billboard)	3
US Billboard 200	10

2008 weekly chart performance for Rock of Ages: The Definitive Collection
Chart (2008)	Peak position
New Zealand Albums (RMNZ)	11

=== Year-end charts ===
Year-end chart performance for Rock of Ages: The Definitive Collection
Chart (2005)	Position
US Billboard 200	197

== Certifications ==
Certifications for Rock of Ages: The Definitive Collection
Region	Certification	Certified units/sales
Canada (Music Canada)	2× Platinum	200,000^{^}
New Zealand (RMNZ)	Gold	7,500^{^}
United States (RIAA)	Platinum	1,000,000^{^}
^{^} Shipments figures based on certification alone.
