= Best of Def Leppard =

Greatest hits album by Def Leppard
- Released: 25 October 2004
- Recorded: 1979–2004
- Genre: Glam metal
- Label: Bludgeon Riffola/Mercury

Def Leppard chronology
X (2002)	Best of Def Leppard (2004)	Rock of Ages: The Definitive Collection (2005)

Best of Def Leppard (or The Best Of) is a compilation album featuring some of Def Leppard's most popular songs. The album charted at No. 6 on the UK Albums Chart.

== Overview ==
Best of supplements 1995's Vault: Def Leppard Greatest Hits (1980–1995) as the definitive collection of Def Leppard's work. In fact, Disc one of Best of is essentially the entire Vault (UK Version) compilation album with the addition of "Long Long Way to Go" from X. A 2-CD limited edition was released in a slipcase with more obscure fan-favourite album cuts on the second disc, including tracks from more recent albums. In the UK, a cover of The Kinks' "Waterloo Sunset" was included as a bonus. This foreshadowed the band's forthcoming '70s cover album Yeah!.

Best of was released in a number of territories around the world, but not in North America, which instead received Rock of Ages: The Definitive Collection.

The single-CD edition of the album features material from 1981's High 'n' Dry through to 2002's X. Track distribution focuses largely on the band's late '80s/early '90s hits, with a single song from High 'n' Dry, two from Pyromania (1983), six from Hysteria (1987), four from Adrenalize (1992), two from Retro Active (1993), and a single song from X. "When Love & Hate Collide", the sole new song from 1995's greatest hits set Vault was also included. The 2-CD version gives a more even cross-section of the band's career, starting with two songs from On Through the Night (1980), four from High 'n' Dry, seven from Pyromania, seven from Hysteria, five from Adrenalize, two from Retro Active, "When Love & Hate Collide" the new song on Vault, two from Slang (1996), one from Euphoria (1999), two from X (2002) and one new song, the cover of "Waterloo Sunset" which was to be included in the band's forthcoming cover album Yeah! (2006).

The songs are the original album versions, with the following exceptions:

- "Pour Some Sugar on Me" is the video edit version. This version actually features an extended, distorted intro, making it longer than the Hysteria version, which has the shorter "Step inside, walk this way" intro.
- "Rocket" is the single edit, which runs around two and a half minutes shorter than its Hysteria album counterpart.
- "Bringin' on the Heartbreak" fades out slightly earlier than the High 'n' Dry version, as the High 'n' Dry version segues into "Switch 625".

== Track listing ==
Disc one
No.	Title	Writer(s)	Origin	Length
1.	"Pour Some Sugar on Me" (Historia video version)	Steve Clark; Phil Collen; Joe Elliott; Robert John "Mutt" Lange; Rick Savage	Hysteria, 1987	4:52
2.	"Photograph"	Clark; Elliott; Lange; Savage; Pete Willis	Pyromania, 1983	4:08
3.	"Love Bites"	Clark; Collen; Elliott; Lange; Savage	Hysteria	5:47
4.	"Let's Get Rocked"	Collen; Elliott; Lange; Savage	Adrenalize, 1992	4:56
5.	"Two Steps Behind"	Elliott	Retro Active and Last Action Hero, 1993	4:20
6.	"Animal"	Clark; Collen; Elliott; Lange; Savage	Hysteria	4:04
7.	"Heaven Is"	Clark; Collen; Elliott; Lange; Savage	Adrenalize	3:34
8.	"Rocket" (Visualize video edit)	Clark; Collen; Elliott; Lange; Savage	Hysteria	4:07
9.	"When Love & Hate Collide"	Elliott; Savage	Vault: Def Leppard Greatest Hits (1980–1995), 1995	4:18
10.	"Action"	Brian Connolly; Steve Priest; Andy Scott; Mick Tucker	Retro Active	3:42
11.	"Long, Long Way to Go"	Wayne Hector; Steve Robson	X, 2002	4:39
12.	"Make Love Like a Man"	Clark; Collen; Elliott; Lange	Adrenalize	4:15
13.	"Armageddon It"	Clark; Collen; Elliott; Lange; Savage	Hysteria	5:22
14.	"Have You Ever Needed Someone So Bad"	Collen; Elliott; Lange	Adrenalize	5:19
15.	"Rock of Ages"	Clark; Elliott; Lange	Pyromania	4:08
16.	"Hysteria"	Clark; Collen; Elliott; Lange; Savage	Hysteria	5:55
17.	"Bringin' On the Heartbreak"	Clark; Elliott; Willis	High 'n' Dry, 1981	4:34

Disc two
No.	Title	Writer(s)	Origin	Length
1.	"Rock! Rock! (Till You Drop)"	Clark; Elliott; Lange; Savage	Pyromania	3:55
2.	"Waterloo Sunset"	Ray Davies	New song; later released on Yeah!, 2006	3:44
3.	"Promises"	Collen; Lange	Euphoria, 1999	3:59
4.	"Slang"	Collen; Elliott	Slang, 1996	2:37
5.	"Foolin'"	Clark; Elliott; Lange	Pyromania	4:34
6.	"Now"	Rick Allen; Vivian Campbell; Collen; Elliott; Marti Frederiksen; Savage	X	3:59
7.	"Rock Brigade"	Clark; Elliott; Savage	On Through the Night, 1980	3:08
8.	"Women"	Clark; Collen; Elliott; Lange; Savage	Hysteria	5:42
9.	"Let It Go"	Clark; Elliott; Willis	High 'n' Dry	4:42
10.	"Too Late for Love"	Clark; Elliott; Lange; Savage; Willis	Pyromania	4:27
11.	"High 'n' Dry (Saturday Night)"	Clark; Elliott; Savage	High 'n' Dry	3:26
12.	"Work It Out"	Campbell	Slang	4:45
13.	"Billy's Got a Gun" (Edited version)	Clark; Elliott; Lange; Savage; Willis	Pyromania	5:00
14.	"Another Hit and Run"	Elliott; Savage	High 'n' Dry	4:58
15.	"Stand Up (Kick Love into Motion)"	Clark; Collen; Elliott; Lange	Adrenalize	4:26
16.	"Wasted"	Clark; Elliott	On Through the Night	3:48
17.	"Die Hard the Hunter"	Clark; Elliott; Lange; Savage	Pyromania	6:17

== Charts ==
Chart (2004)	Peak position
Japanese Albums (Oricon)	43
Norwegian Albums (VG-lista)	7
Scottish Albums (OCC)	6
Swedish Albums (Sverigetopplistan)	19
Swiss Albums (Schweizer Hitparade)	76
UK Albums (OCC)	6
UK Rock & Metal Albums (OCC)	2

== Certifications ==
Region	Certification	Certified units/sales
Argentina (CAPIF)	Gold	20,000^{^}
United Kingdom (BPI)	Platinum	300,000^{^}
^{^} Shipments figures based on certification alone.
