= Retro Active =

1993 compilation album by Def Leppard

Compilation album of B-side singles by Def Leppard
- Released: 4 October 1993
- Recorded: February 1984 – June 1993
- Venues: Olympiahalle (Munich, Germany)
- Studios: Wisseloord Studios; (Hilversum, Netherlands); Rainbow Studios; (Munich, Germany); Bow Lane Studios; (Dublin, Ireland); Joe's Garage; (Dublin, Ireland)
- Genre: Pop metal
- Length: 56:04
- Label: Mercury
- Producers: Def Leppard; Pete Woodroffe

Def Leppard chronology
Adrenalize (1992)	Retro Active (1993)	Vault: Def Leppard Greatest Hits (1980–1995) (1995)

Singles from Retro Active
- 1. "Two Steps Behind" Released: August 1993 (US); 2. "Miss You in a Heartbeat" Released: December 1993 (US); 3. "Action" Released: January 1994 (UK)

Professional ratings
Review scores
Source	Rating
AllMusic	3/5 stars
Rolling Stone	4/5 stars
Sputnikmusic	3.5/5 stars

Retro Active is a compilation album by the English rock band Def Leppard, released in 1993. The album features touched-up versions of B-sides and previously unreleased recordings from the band's recording sessions from 1984 to 1993. The album charted at number 9 on the Billboard 200 and No. 6 on the UK Albums Chart.

== Overview ==
After releasing only five albums over the course of a twelve-year period, Def Leppard used Retro Active to break that habit, provide a treat for diehard fans, and close the door on the "Steve Clark" era of the band. Many of the tracks had previously been released as single B-sides.

According to singer Joe Elliott, the concept behind the album was envisioned after the success of the "Two Steps Behind" single. The song had originally been demoed solely by Elliott as an electric version in 1989, and was subsequently recorded by the band as an acoustic ballad at the suggestion of guitarist Phil Collen. When the producers of the film Last Action Hero contacted the band in 1993 to provide a new song for the soundtrack, the band were unable to record new material due to touring schedules and instead sent over the multitrack tape of the acoustic version of "Two Steps Behind", which was given strings by conductor Michael Kamen in April 1993 and included onto the film soundtrack. It would become the band's last Top 20 single in the US, reaching No. 12, and inspired the band to put the album together and re-record the electric version of the song.

"She's Too Tough" and the electric version of "Miss You in a Heartbeat" were both B-sides included as bonus tracks on Japanese pressings of Adrenalize. Written in 1985, "She's Too Tough" first appeared on the Helix album Wild in the Streets in 1987. "Miss You in a Heartbeat", meanwhile, was first written and demoed by guitarist Collen in 1991 and was originally recorded by the Law, a band featuring Paul Rodgers and the Who drummer Kenney Jones, for their self-titled album in 1991. Def Leppard later recorded their own version in April the following year, which they released as a B-side on the "Make Love Like a Man" single. After the band had recorded the new vocal, bass and drum parts for the electric version of the song, Collen overheard Elliott experimenting with the song on a piano. This led Elliott to record a piano and vocal version of the song, after which Collen, bassist Rick Savage and drummer Rick Allen added acoustic and electric guitars, bass guitar and drum parts in June 1993, creating the acoustic version that would be released as a single.

Two unfinished songs from the Hysteria recording sessions, "Desert Song" and "Fractured Love", were completed exclusively for the album. The album also features several covers, namely Sweet's "Action" (which charted higher than the original in the UK) and Mick Ronson's "Only After Dark".

The version of "Ride into the Sun" on the compilation is not the same as that which appeared on The Def Leppard E.P., but rather the 1987 re-recording. It differs slightly from the original B-side from the Hysteria era; the B-side featured a Rick Allen drum solo intro, whereas the version on Retro Active has a piano intro provided by Ian Hunter.

Retro Active features a hidden (final) track: a piano/vocal version of "Miss You in a Heartbeat", which also features an alternate acoustic guitar solo by Collen.

This is the first Def Leppard album to feature songs recorded with newly added guitarist Vivian Campbell.

== Album cover ==
The album cover, by Nels Israelson and Hugh Syme, is a photograph of a lady sitting at a dressing table, looking in a mirror. However, if the cover is viewed at arm's length or from a distance, it takes the form of a skull (a type of vanitas art), the woman's head forming the left eye socket, and her reflected head in the mirror forming the right eye socket. The mirror itself forms the shape of the skull and the accessories on the dressing table form the nose, nostrils and teeth. It was inspired by Charles Allan Gilbert's most famous work, All Is Vanity (1892). An alternate version of the album cover exists, only released for promotional use. The only difference is the Def Leppard logo is represented in the most traditional style seen on Pyromania, Hysteria and Adrenalize. The band felt that, given Retro Active's sonically darker tone, that it would be best to shelve the bright colours of the logo.

== Reception ==
In a 3.5 out of 5 review, Sputnikmusic wrote that while the compilation "cannot be rated super highly, it is extremely rare for a compilation album such as this to do so. With that in mind, this is indeed a pleasant surprise which will at least please some of Def Leppard’s longtime fans due to the relatively organic production levels used here. Importantly, a wise balance of song types is included within the 46 minute (60 if the three alternate versions are counted) duration, meaning that the accessible tracks resulted in this album still selling well and deservedly going top 10 in both the U.S & U.K."

Eduardo Rivadavia of AllMusic gave particular praise to "Desert Song" and "Fractured Love", citing them as Retro Active's "most distinctive tracks, harkening back to the band's early (pre-success) days with their rough power chords." He concludes by saying that overall, "this is an interesting release which marks the end of a long chapter in the band's history, following the death of guitarist and guiding force Steve Clark. While casual fans might find it confusing, Leppard fanatics will revel in its diversity and informative liner notes."

Rating the compilation 4 out of 5, Paul Evans of Rolling Stone notes that the band's "chief strength has always been the songs they write, and Retro Active underscores that appeal. From the Zeplike "Desert Song" to "She's Too Tough" and its feisty rock & roll, from the power ballad "Two Steps Behind" to "Ride Into the Sun," a raver from their 1979 debut, this is premium pop-metal - sharp hooks and engaging thunder."

== Track listing ==
No.	Title	Writer(s)	Length
1.	"Desert Song"	Steve Clark; Joe Elliott; Rick Savage	5:19
2.	"Fractured Love"	Clark; Elliott; Savage	5:08
3.	"Action" (The Sweet cover)	Andy Scott; Brian Connolly; Steve Priest; Mick Tucker	3:41
4.	"Two Steps Behind" (acoustic version)	Elliott	4:16
5.	"She's Too Tough"	Elliott	3:41
6.	"Miss You in a Heartbeat" (acoustic version)	Phil Collen	4:04
7.	"Only After Dark" (Mick Ronson cover)	Ronson; Scott Richardson	3:52
8.	"Ride into the Sun" (1987 re-recording)	Elliott; Savage	3:12
9.	"From the Inside" (with the Hothouse Flowers)	Elliott	4:13
10.	"Ring of Fire"	Clark; Collen; Elliott; Robert John "Mutt" Lange; Savage	4:42
11.	"I Wanna Be Your Hero"	Clark; Collen; Elliott; Lange; Savage	4:29
12.	"Miss You in a Heartbeat" (electric version)	Collen	4:58
13.	"Two Steps Behind" (electric version)	Elliott	4:29
14.	"Miss You in a Heartbeat" (piano version) (hidden track)	Collen	4:09

=== Track notes ===
- "Desert Song" was a previously unreleased outtake from the Hysteria album sessions (1984–87).
- "Fractured Love" was also a previously unreleased outtake from the Hysteria album sessions.
- "Action" was originally released on the "Make Love Like a Man" single; this version has re-recorded snare drums.
- "Two Steps Behind" was originally released on the "Make Love Like a Man" single. The acoustic version here is the same version released on the Last Action Hero soundtrack and has added strings compared to the original. The electric version of the song had never been released previously.
- "She's Too Tough" was originally released on the "Heaven Is", "Tonight", and "Stand Up (Kick Love into Motion)" singles, and was also a bonus track on the Japanese edition of Adrenalize; this version has re-recorded drums.
- "Miss You in a Heartbeat" was originally released on the "Make Love Like a Man" single and was a bonus track on the Japanese edition of Adrenalize. The electric version (track 12) is based on the original B-side but with re-recorded drums and some additional previously muted guitar parts during the final chorus from Phil Collen's original demo. The newly-recorded acoustic version (track 6) contains piano played by both Joe Elliott and Pete Woodroffe, along with other members of the band on acoustic instruments, while the hidden track piano version (track 14) features just Elliott on vocals and piano, along with some acoustic guitar by Collen.
- "Only After Dark" had previously appeared on the "Let's Get Rocked" single; extra guitars were added for this release.
- "Ride into the Sun" first appeared on the band's first commercial release, The Def Leppard E.P.. The song was later re-recorded and released on the "Hysteria" single in 1987, as well as some editions of "Love Bites" in 1988. The version on Retro Active is based on the re-recording but features new drums and a new piano intro.
- "From the Inside" appears as it did in its original release on the 1992 single release of "Have You Ever Needed Someone So Bad" and some single releases of "Stand Up (Kick Love into Motion)".
- "Ring of Fire" was originally released on the 1988 singles "Pour Some Sugar on Me" in the US and "Armageddon It" in the UK. This version has an alternative intro that no longer fades in as well as re-recorded drums and new lead vocals mixed in with the original lead vocals.
- "I Wanna Be Your Hero" was originally released on the 1987 singles "Animal" in the US and "Pour Some Sugar on Me" in the UK. The version here features a slightly different intro, re-recorded drums and omits the false ending found on the original.

== Personnel ==
- Joe Elliott – lead vocals, rhythm guitar, piano, jungle orchestra on "Fractured Love"
- Phil Collen – electric and acoustic guitars, backing vocals
- Steve Clark – electric guitars
- Vivian Campbell – electric and acoustic guitars, backing vocals
- Rick Savage – bass guitar, keyboards, backing vocals, rhythm guitar on “Ring of Fire”
- Rick Allen – drums, percussion

=== Additional musicians ===
- Ian Hunter – honky tonk messiah on "Ride into the Sun"
- Michael Kamen – string arrangement on "Two Steps Behind" (acoustic version)
- Robert John "Mutt" Lange – backing vocals on "Ring of Fire"
- Fiachna Ó Braonáin – tin whistle on "From the Inside"
- Liam Ó Maonlaí – grand piano on "From the Inside"
- Peter O'Toole – mandolin on "From the Inside"
- P.J. Smith – backing vocals on "Action"
- Pete Woodroffe – piano on "Miss You in a Heartbeat" (acoustic version)

== Production ==
- Def Leppard – producer
- Pete Woodroffe – engineer, mixing, co-producer on tracks 2–4, 6 and 14
- Janfred Arendsen – engineer
- Albert Boekholt – engineer
- Giles Cowley – mixing
- Freek Feenstra – engineer
- Nigel Green – engineer
- Steve McGaughlin – engineer
- Erwin Musper – engineer
- Nial O'Sullivan – mixing
- Ronald Prent – engineer
- Robert Scovill – engineer
- Mike Shipley – engineer

== Charts ==
Chart performance for Retro Active
Chart (1993–1994)	Peak position
Australian Albums (ARIA)	33
Canada Top Albums/CDs (RPM)	7
Finnish Albums (The Official Finnish Charts)	6
German Albums (Offizielle Top 100)	36
Japanese Albums (Oricon)	16
Swedish Albums (Sverigetopplistan)	12
Swiss Albums (Schweizer Hitparade)	7
UK Albums (Official Charts)	6
US Billboard 200	9

== Certifications ==
Region	Certification	Certified units/sales
Canada (Music Canada)	Platinum	100,000^{^}
Switzerland (IFPI Switzerland)	Gold	25,000^{^}
United Kingdom (BPI)	Silver	60,000^{^}
United States (RIAA)	Platinum	1,000,000^{^}
^{^} Shipments figures based on certification alone.
