= Vault: Def Leppard Greatest Hits (1980–1995) =

Greatest hits album by Def Leppard
- Released: 23 October 1995
- Recorded: 1981–1995
- Genre: Hard rock
- Length: 73:20 (EU version); 77:08(North America version); 76:38 (Japan version)
- Label: Mercury
- Producers: Robert John "Mutt" Lange; Mike Shipley; Def Leppard; Pete Woodroffe

Def Leppard chronology
Retro Active (1993)	Vault: Def Leppard Greatest Hits (1980–1995) (1995)	Slang (1996)

Alternative cover
- Limited edition 2-CD cover

Singles from Vault: Def Leppard Greatest Hits (1980–1995)
- 1. "When Love & Hate Collide" Released: 2 October 1995

Vault: Def Leppard Greatest Hits (1980–1995) is the first greatest hits album and the second compilation album by English hard rock band Def Leppard. The album was originally released in the band's home country on 23 October 1995 by Mercury Records. It was released in North America a week later on 31 October by the same label. Vault went on to be certified gold in four countries, platinum in three and multi-platinum in two. In the US, the album is currently certified 5× platinum by the RIAA, and in June 2011 it topped the five million mark in sales there. It won Metal Edge magazine's 1995 Readers' Choice Award for "Best Hits or Compilation Album."

The album featured one newly recorded song, "When Love & Hate Collide", which was released as a single on 2 October 1995.

The collection's track listing varied by region, although none of the releases had any songs from the band's 1980 debut album, On Through the Night on the track listings.

On 23 October 1995, to promote the release of Vault, the band played acoustic shows on three continents in one day: Tangiers, Morocco in Africa; London, England, UK in Europe; and Vancouver, British Columbia, Canada in North America. The feat also made the Guinness Book of World Records.

== Overview ==
Professional ratings
Review scores
Source	Rating
AllMusic	link
Robert Christgau	(dud)
Music Week	4/5 stars

One new track was recorded for this collection, "When Love & Hate Collide", previously a leftover from the Adrenalize recording sessions. The ballad became the band's joint highest-charting single in the UK, along with 1992's "Let's Get Rocked", hitting No. 2 in the fall of 1995.

The songs are the original album versions, with the following exceptions:

- "Pour Some Sugar on Me" is the video edit version. This version actually features an extended, distorted intro, making it longer than the Hysteria version, which has the shorter "Step inside, walk this way" intro.
- "Rocket" is the single edit, which runs around two and a half minutes shorter than its Hysteria album counterpart.
- "Bringin' on the Heartbreak" fades out slightly earlier than the High 'n' Dry version, as the High 'n' Dry version segues into "Switch 625", except the North American release.

== Artwork, design, and packaging ==
The art direction and design for Vault was handled by Exquisite Corpse with photography by Cythia Levine and Ross Halfin. Most covers of the album have a picture of an actual vault, while a limited edition two disc collection has a picture of a green eye with a combination lock inside the pupil. The CD liner notes featured a three-page summary of the band's history by Peter Mensch, who appeared in two of the group's music videos. Although not featured on the North American release, other liner notes feature a note signed by the band members talking about the group's upcoming album, Slang.

== Track listing ==
European release
No.	Title	Writer(s)	Origin	Length
1.	"Pour Some Sugar on Me" (Historia video edit)	Steve Clark; Phil Collen; Joe Elliott; Robert John "Mutt" Lange; Rick Savage	Hysteria, 1987	4:52
2.	"Photograph"	Clark; Elliott; Lange; Savage; Pete Willis	Pyromania, 1983	4:08
3.	"Love Bites"	Clark; Collen; Elliott; Lange; Savage	Hysteria	5:47
4.	"Let's Get Rocked"	Collen; Elliott; Lange; Savage	Adrenalize, 1992	4:56
5.	"Two Steps Behind" (acoustic version)	Elliott	Retro Active and Last Action Hero, 1993	4:19
6.	"Animal"	Clark; Collen; Elliott; Lange; Savage	Hysteria	4:03
7.	"Heaven Is"	Clark; Collen; Elliott; Lange; Savage	Adrenalize	3:34
8.	"Rocket" (Visualize video edit)	Clark; Collen; Elliott; Lange; Savage	Hysteria	4:07
9.	"When Love & Hate Collide"	Elliott; Savage	Previously unreleased, 1995	4:18
10.	"Action" (The Sweet cover)	Brian Connolly; Steve Priest; Andy Scott; Mick Tucker	Retro Active	3:40
11.	"Make Love Like a Man"	Clark; Collen; Elliott; Lange	Adrenalize	4:15
12.	"Armageddon It"	Clark; Collen; Elliott; Lange; Savage	Hysteria	5:22
13.	"Have You Ever Needed Someone So Bad"	Collen; Elliott; Lange	Adrenalize	5:19
14.	"Rock of Ages"	Clark; Elliott; Lange	Pyromania	4:02
15.	"Hysteria"	Clark; Collen; Elliott; Lange; Savage	Hysteria	5:56
16.	"Bringin' on the Heartbreak"	Clark; Elliott; Willis	High 'n' Dry, 1981	4:32
Total length:				73:20

North American release
No.	Title	Writer(s)	Origin	Length
1.	"Pour Some Sugar on Me" (Historia video edit)	Clark; Collen; Elliott; Lange; Savage	Hysteria	4:52
2.	"Photograph"	Clark; Elliott; Lange; Savage; Willis	Pyromania	4:08
3.	"Love Bites"	Clark; Collen; Elliott; Lange; Savage	Hysteria	5:47
4.	"Let's Get Rocked"	Collen; Elliott; Lange; Savage	Adrenalize	4:56
5.	"Two Steps Behind" (acoustic version)	Elliott	Retro Active and Last Action Hero	4:19
6.	"Animal"	Clark; Collen; Elliott; Lange; Savage	Hysteria	4:03
7.	"Heaven Is"	Clark; Collen; Elliott; Lange; Savage	Adrenalize	3:34
8.	"Foolin'"	Clark; Elliott; Lange	Pyromania	4:34
9.	"Rocket" (Visualize video edit)	Clark; Collen; Elliott; Lange; Savage	Hysteria	4:07
10.	"When Love & Hate Collide"	Elliott; Savage	Previously unreleased	4:16
11.	"Armageddon It"	Clark; Collen; Elliott; Lange; Savage	Hysteria	5:22
12.	"Have You Ever Needed Someone So Bad?"	Collen; Elliott; Lange	Adrenalize	5:19
13.	"Rock of Ages"	Clark; Elliott; Lange	Pyromania	4:08
14.	"Hysteria"	Clark; Collen; Elliott; Lange; Savage	Hysteria	5:56
15.	"Miss You in a Heartbeat" (acoustic version)	Collen	Retro Active	4:05
16.	"Bringin' on the Heartbreak"	Clark; Elliott; Willis	High 'n' Dry	4:33
17.	"Switch 625" (instrumental)	Clark; Elliott; Willis	High 'n' Dry	3:04
Total length:				77:08

Japanese release
No.	Title	Writer(s)	Origin	Length
1.	"Pour Some Sugar on Me" (Historia video edit)	Clark; Collen; Elliott; Lange; Savage	Hysteria	4:52
2.	"Photograph"	Clark; Elliott; Lange; Savage; Willis	Pyromania	4:08
3.	"Love Bites"	Clark; Collen; Elliott; Lange; Savage	Hysteria	5:47
4.	"Let's Get Rocked"	Collen; Elliott; Lange; Savage	Adrenalize	4:56
5.	"Two Steps Behind" (acoustic version)	Elliott	Retro Active and Last Action Hero	4:19
6.	"Animal"	Clark; Collen; Elliott; Lange; Savage	Hysteria	4:05
7.	"Action"	Connolly; Priest; Scott; Tucker	Retro Active	3:40
8.	"Rocket" (Visualize video edit)	Clark; Collen; Elliott; Lange; Savage	Hysteria	4:07
9.	"When Love & Hate Collide"	Elliott; Savage	Previously unreleased	4:16
10.	"Rock! Rock! (Till You Drop)"	Clark; Elliott; Lange; Savage	Pyromania	3:54
11.	"Armageddon It"	Clark; Collen; Elliott; Lange; Savage	Hysteria	5:22
12.	"Foolin'"	Clark; Elliott; Lange	Pyromania	4:34
13.	"Have You Ever Needed Someone So Bad?"	Collen; Elliott; Lange	Adrenalize	5:19
14.	"Rock of Ages"	Clark; Elliott; Lange	Pyromania	4:08
15.	"Hysteria"	Clark; Collen; Elliott; Lange; Savage	Hysteria	5:55
16.	"Bringin' on the Heartbreak"	Clark; Elliott; Willis	High 'n' Dry	4:32
17.	"Can't Keep Away from the Flame"	Collen; Elliott	Previously unreleased, 1995	2:36
Total length:				76:38

Bonus live CD (Some editions of the album came with a bonus limited edition live CD recorded at Don Valley Stadium in Sheffield on 6 June 1993.)
No.	Title	Writer(s)	Length
1.	"Let's Get Rocked"	Clark; Collen; Elliott; Lange; Savage	5:00
2.	"Armageddon It"	Clark; Collen; Elliott; Lange; Savage	6:12
3.	"Foolin'"	Clark; Elliott; Lange	4:52
4.	"Rocket"	Clark; Collen; Elliott; Lange; Savage	9:28
5.	"Two Steps Behind"	Elliott	5:01
6.	"Pour Some Sugar on Me"	Clark; Collen; Elliott; Lange; Savage	5:00
7.	"Rock of Ages"	Clark; Elliott; Lange	5:55
8.	"Love Bites"	Clark; Collen; Elliott; Lange; Savage	7:37
9.	"Photograph"	Clark; Elliott; Lange; Savage; Willis	7:08

== Personnel ==
The following people contributed to Vault:

- Joe Elliott – lead vocals, backing vocals, producer, piano on "Miss You in a Heartbeat"
- Steve Clark – guitars, backing vocals
- Phil Collen – guitars, backing vocals, producer
- Rick Savage – bass, backing vocals, producer
- Rick Allen – drums, backing vocals, producer
- Robert John "Mutt" Lange – producer, backing vocals
- Nigel Green – engineer
- Pete Willis – guitars, backing vocals
- Mike Shipley – mixing, producer, engineer
- Vivian Campbell – guitars, backing vocals, producer
- Pete Woodroffe – producer, engineer, piano on "Miss You in a Heartbeat"
- Michael Kamen – string arrangements on "Two Steps Behind" and "When Love & Hate Collide"
- Stevie Vann – backing vocals on "When Love & Hate Collide"
- Randy Kerber – piano on "When Love & Hate Collide"
- Bob Ludwig – mastering

== Charts ==
=== Weekly charts ===
Weekly chart performance for Vault: Def Leppard Greatest Hits (1980–1995)
Chart (1995)	Peak position
Australian Albums (ARIA)	9
Belgian Albums (Ultratop Flanders)	30
Canada Top Albums/CDs (RPM)	7
Danish Albums (Hitlisten)	2
Danish Albums (Hitlisten)	1
Dutch Albums (Album Top 100)	88
Estonia Top CD Albums (Eesti Top 10)	6
European Albums (European Top 100 Albums)	7
Finnish Albums (Suomen virallinen lista)	7
French Compilations	24
German Albums (Offizielle Top 100)	31
Irish Albums (IRMA)	1
Japanese Albums (Oricon)	9
New Zealand Albums (RMNZ)	2
Portuguese Albums (AFP)	4
Scottish Albums (Official Charts)	4
Swedish Albums (Sverigetopplistan)	7
Swiss Albums (Schweizer Hitparade)	7
UK Albums (Official Charts)	3
UK Rock & Metal Albums (Official Charts)	1
UK Albums (GfK Chart-Track)	1
US Billboard 200	15

Chart (1996)	Peak position
Norwegian Albums (VG-lista)	7

Chart (2018)	Peak position
US Top Rock Albums (Billboard)	12

=== Year-end charts ===
Year-end chart performance for Vault: Def Leppard Greatest Hits (1980–1995)
Chart (1995)	Position
UK Albums (OCC)	30
Chart (1996)	Position
US Billboard 200	72
Chart (2002)	Position
Canadian Metal Albums (Nielsen SoundScan)	44
Chart (2018)	Position
US Top Rock Albums (Billboard)	80

== Certifications ==
Region	Certification	Certified units/sales
Canada (Music Canada)	2× Platinum	200,000^{^}
Denmark (IFPI Danmark)	Gold	25,000^{^}
Japan (RIAJ)	Gold	100,000^{^}
Mexico (AMPROFON)	Gold	100,000^{^}
New Zealand (RMNZ)	Platinum	15,000^{^}
Norway (IFPI Norway)	Gold	25,000^{*}
United Kingdom (BPI)	Platinum	300,000^{^}
United States (RIAA)	5× Platinum	5,000,000^{^}
^{*} Sales figures based on certification alone.^{^} Shipments figures based on certification alone.
