= The Law (The Law album) =

Studio album by The Law
- Released: 19 March 1991, 2002 (Re-Released)
- Recorded: 1991
- Genre: Rock
- Length: 50:50 (2008 version)
- Label: Atlantic
- Producers: Chris Kimsey, Ahmet Ertegün, Howard Albert, Ron Albert, Kenney Jones, Shane Keister, Paul Rodgers, Eddie Wilner (re-issue producer)

Professional ratings
Review scores
Source	Rating
Allmusic	2.5/5 stars
Q Magazine	2/5 stars

The Law is the first and only album from the English rock band The Law.

== History ==
The Law was formed when Paul Rodgers met Kenney Jones in a nightclub in London and decided to put a band together. The two teamed up with different supporting musicians in order to give Rodgers freedom to pursue whatever music style he felt like. Unlike his previous projects, in which he wrote or co-wrote most of the material, Rodgers relied heavily on outside writers to write songs for the album (such as Phil Collen, Chris Rea and Bryan Adams); the only chart topper of the album, "Laying Down the Law", was written by Rodgers himself. The album features notable appearances by David Gilmour, Bryan Adams and Chris Rea. The song "Stone" was previously recorded by Rea for his album Shamrock Diaries, and Rea (as well as Gilmour) plays guitar on this version. The track "Miss You in a Heartbeat", written by Phil Collen, was later recorded by Collen's band Def Leppard for their Retro Active album.

Aside from the single, the album was received very poorly by the critics. Paul Henderson in Q Magazine called it "lightweight". Rodgers soon moved on from the band to his solo work.

== Track listing ==
No.	Title	Writer(s)	Length
1.	"For a Little Ride"	Mark Mangold, Benny Mardones	3:54
2.	"Miss You in a Heartbeat"	Phil Collen	4:32
3.	"Stone Cold"	Tamara Champlin	4:13
4.	"Come Save Me (Julianne)"	Charlie Black, Cliff Downs, Austin Roberts	4:01
5.	"Laying Down the Law"	Paul Rodgers	4:22
6.	"Nature of the Beast"	Bryan Adams, Jim Vallance	3:53
7.	"Stone"	Chris Rea	5:12
8.	"Anything for You"	Steve Diamond, Eric McCusker	3:57
9.	"Best of My Love"	Jerry Lynn Williams	4:36
10.	"Tough Love"	Rodgers	3:41
11.	"Missing You Bad Girl"	Rodgers	4:42

2008 reissue bonus track
No.	Title	Writer(s)	Length
12.	"That's When You Fall in Love"	Rodgers	3:47

== Personnel ==
=== The Law ===
- Paul Rodgers - lead vocals, guitars, piano
- Kenney Jones - drums
- Jim Barber - lead guitar

=== Additional musicians ===
- John Staehely - guitar
- Pino Palladino - bass
- David Gilmour - guitar on "Stone"
- Chris Rea - guitar on "Stone"
- Bryan Adams, Mike Hehir - guitars
- Jon Astley, Steve Pigott - keyboards, programming
- Albhy Galuten - synthesizer
- George Hawkins - bass
- Tom Pool - drums
- Joe Lala - percussion
- The Memphis Horns - horns

== Production ==
- Produced by Chris Kimsey, Ahmet Ertegün, Howard Albert, Ron Albert, Kenney Jones, Shane Keister and Paul Rodgers
- Engineers: Christopher Marc Potter, Alex Sadkin
- Programming: John Jones
- Mixing: Ahmet Ertegün, Shane Keister, Christopher Marc Potter
- Mastering: Bob Ludwig
- Re-mastering: Jimmy Starr
