= Only After Dark =

1974 song by Mick Ronson

Song by Mick Ronson

from the album Slaughter on 10th Avenue
- Released: February 1974
- Recorded: July 1973
- Studio: Château d'Hérouville, Hérouville, France; Trident, London
- Genre: Glam rock
- Length: 3:32
- Label: RCA
- Producer: Mick Ronson

"Only After Dark"

Single by The Human League

from the album Travelogue
- B-side: "Toyota City"
- Released: 9 May 1980
- Recorded: Monumental Studios, Sheffield, England
- Genre: Synth-pop, new wave, minimal wave
- Length: 3:51
- Label: Virgin Records
- Songwriters: Mick Ronson; Scott Richardson
- Producers: The Human League; Richard Manwaring

The Human League singles chronology
"Empire State Human" (1980)	"Only After Dark" (1980)	"Boys and Girls" (1981)

"Only After Dark" is a song by the English guitarist, songwriter, multi-instrumentalist, arranger, and producer Mick Ronson. Co-written with Scott Richardson, it was on Ronson's 1974 debut solo album Slaughter on 10th Avenue, released shortly after leaving David Bowie's backing band The Spiders from Mars. It was the B-side to Ronson's second solo single "Love Me Tender"; a song made famous by Elvis Presley.

== Cover versions ==
In 1980, British synthpop group the Human League recorded a version for the band's second album, Travelogue, which was co-produced by the band and Richard Manwaring.

The song was pressed as a single by Virgin Records following the release of the Travelogue album, but it was then decided to re-release the song "Empire State Human" (from the band's first album) instead and include "Only After Dark" as a free single to be given away with the first 15,000 copies of "Empire State Human". This was perceived by the band as a total lack of faith in their newer material, causing great resentment and anger, and would be one of the issues that contributed to the split of this line-up of The Human League some months later. As a free single it was not included in the UK chart mechanism, though the re-release of "Empire State Human" to which it belonged peaked at No. 62.

Fellow Sheffield band, Def Leppard covered "Only After Dark" in 1992, as a B-side to their UK No. 2 hit single, "Let's Get Rocked". Their version was later included on the 1993 compilation Retro Active; a collection of touched-up versions of B-sides and previously unreleased recordings from the band's recording sessions between 1984 and 1993.

== Cultural reference ==
Only After Dark. a Birmingham clubnight specialising in music from the New Romantic era and David Bowie, has run since 2009 at various Birmingham venues.
