= Bringin' On the Heartbreak =

1981 single by Def Leppard

Single by Def Leppard

from the album High 'n' Dry
- B-side: "Me and My Wine"
- Released: 13 November 1981 (US); 22 January 1982 (UK)
- Recorded: March–June 1981
- Studio: Battery (London)
- Genre: Glam metal; hard rock
- Length: 4:34
- Label: Mercury
- Songwriters: Steve Clark; Pete Willis; Joe Elliott
- Producer: Robert John "Mutt" Lange

Def Leppard singles chronology
"Let It Go" (1981)	"Bringin' On the Heartbreak" (1981)	"Photograph" (1983)

Music videos
- "Bringin' On the Heartbreak" (Version 1) on YouTube; "Bringin' On the Heartbreak" (Version 2) on YouTube

"Bringin' On the Heartbreak" (remix)

Single by Def Leppard

from the album High 'n' Dry
- B-side: "Me and My Wine" (remix)
- Released: June 1984
- Recorded: March–June 1981 (original); February 1984 (synth overdubs)
- Studio: Battery (London)
- Genre: Glam metal; hard rock; soft rock
- Length: 4:34
- Label: Mercury
- Songwriters: Steve Clark; Pete Willis; Joe Elliott
- Producer: Robert John "Mutt" Lange

Def Leppard singles chronology
"Too Late for Love" (1983)	"Bringin' On the Heartbreak" (remix) (1984)	"Animal" (1987)

Audio video
- "Bringin' On the Heartbreak'" on YouTube

"Bringin' On the Heartbreak" is a song by English rock band Def Leppard. A power ballad, it was the second single from their 1981 album High 'n' Dry. The song was written by three of the band's members, Steve Clark, Pete Willis and Joe Elliott.

== Musical style ==
"Bringin' On the Heartbreak" has been described as glam metal, hard rock, and soft rock. Record World said that "Joe Elliot's dramatic vocals and the estranged guitar cries plod over a sledge-hammer beat."

== Production ==
High 'n' Dry was released in the US in summer 1981. "Bringin' On the Heartbreak" was commercially released in the US on 13 November, with "Me and My Wine" (a non-album track) and "You Got Me Runnin'" included as B-sides. It did not appear on the US charts, but its music video was picked up by the recently launched television channel MTV and received heavy rotation. The popularity of the video and the exposure the band received caused a resurgence in sales of High 'n' Dry, which subsequently sold over two million copies. It was released in Mexico as "Llevarlo en la Desilusión" with "Yo y mi Vino" ("Me and My Wine"), featuring the cover art from the single "Too Late for Love".

High 'n' Dry was re-issued in May 1984 with two new tracks, one of which was a synthesizer-heavy remix of "Bringin' On the Heartbreak". With a newly-filmed video featuring Phil Collen on guitar, the remix was released as a single and peaked at 61 on the US Billboard Hot 100. The original version of the song was later included on three of their compilation albums: Vault: Def Leppard Greatest Hits (1980–1995) (1995) Best of Def Leppard (2004) and Rock of Ages: The Definitive Collection (2005). The latter compilation ends with the instrumental "Switch 625", as it does in High 'n' Dry. Steve Huey of AllMusic has characterised the song as an "unabashedly dramatic rock ballad."

=== Music video ===
The first music video was directed by Doug Smith, and is a live recording of Def Leppard performing the song at the Royal Court Theatre in Liverpool, England on 22 July 1981. It was originally filmed (along with clips for "Let It Go" and "High 'n' Dry") as part of Don Kirshner's Rock Concert television series on the US network ABC. The second music video, directed by David Mallet, was shot in February 1984 in Jacob's Biscuit Factory in Lake, Dublin, Ireland and features replacement guitarist Phil Collen playing Pete Willis's part. The original version of the second video featuring the remix is only available on the VHS and LaserDisc versions of the band's video compilation release Historia. DVD reissues of Historia, and the band's subsequent video compilations Best of the Videos and Rock of Ages - The DVD Collection replace the remix soundtrack with the original High 'n' Dry LP recording.

=== Track listing ===
7" Mercury / 818 779-7 (US)

1. "Bringin' On the Heartbreak" (remix)
2. "Me & My Wine" (remix)

=== Personnel ===
- Joe Elliott – lead vocals
- Phil Collen – rhythm guitar, backing vocals (1984 remix recording)
- Steve Clark – lead guitar, backing vocals
- Pete Willis – rhythm guitar, backing vocals
- Rick Savage – bass, backing vocals
- Rick Allen – drums

=== Charts ===
Chart (1984–1985)	Peak position
US Billboard Hot 100	61

== Mariah Carey version ==
"Bringin' On the Heartbreak"
- European CD single cover

Single by Mariah Carey

from the album Charmbracelet
- B-side: "Miss You"
- Released: June 2, 2003
- Recorded: 2002
- Studio: Westlake (Los Angeles, California); Record Plant (Los Angeles, California); Henson (Los Angeles, California); Enterprise 2 (Los Angeles, California); Right Track (New York City)
- Genre: R&B; hard rock
- Length: 4:30
- Label: Island Def Jam; MonarC
- Songwriters: Steve Clark; Pete Willis; Joe Elliott
- Producers: Mariah Carey; Randy Jackson

Mariah Carey singles chronology
"I Know What You Want" (2003)	"Bringin' On the Heartbreak" (2003)	"U Make Me Wanna" (2004)

Music video
- "Bringin' On the Heartbreak" on YouTube

Alternative cover art
- Alternative single cover, used in promotional releases in the United States. Also used for some other releases in the US and the UK omitting "RJ Janman Mix" on the front cover.

=== Background and composition ===
In 2002, the song was covered by American singer-songwriter Mariah Carey for her album Charmbracelet (2002). Asked about Carey's cover version, Joe Elliott told the Las Vegas Sun, "I think she's done a very good job. It's faithful to the arrangement, but not done like a rock song." Referring to Carey's whistle register vocals at the end, Elliott commented that her "astonishing vocal gymnastics toward the end...make Minnie Riperton sound like Tom Waits." Phil Collen praised Carey's cover as a "genuine version of our song" and defended it from Def Leppard's more critical fans: "The fans really get it wrong sometimes. She's on our side and it's an honour she's done it. Really, that's the only way we're getting played."

Carey co-produced her cover of the song with Randy Jackson. The single version also featured a newly recorded solo and extra guitar overdubs performed by Dave Navarro. One of Carey's few songs with a heavy rock influence, it was released as the album's third and final single on June 2, 2003, by Island Def Jam and her own label, MonarC. It was also the final single from MonarC before she shut it down in 2004.

=== Critical reception ===
Carey's version of "Bringin' On the Heartbreak" received positive reviews from music critics. Barry Walters of Rolling Stone described the song as the catchiest on Charmbracelet, as well as a "fascinatingly overblown orchestral remake." Michael Paoletta from Billboard was also favourable by naming it "the set's crowning glory." Kelefa Sanneh from The New York Times called the song as a "high point" on Charmbracelet. Sal Cinquemani from Slant Magazine called this cover "daring" and praised its "surprising amount of live instrumentation, which contributes to an overall sense of warmth that's been otherwise missing from Carey's recent work." Stephen Thomas Erlewine of AllMusic stated that it is best song on the album, but pointed out that it "isn't even covered all that well."

Carey's version was number 24 on VH1's "Least Metal Moments" in a segment subtitled "Bringin' On the Headache"—because many metal fans and musicians did not like the remake.

=== Chart performance ===
Similar to the commercial performance of "Boy (I Need You)", the album's second single, "Bringin' On the Heartbreak" failed to enter the US Billboard Hot 100, or the Bubbling Under Hot 100 Singles chart. It reached the top-thirty in Switzerland, and the top-forty in Belgium; but peaked outside the top-forty in Austria. Junior Vasquez, Mike Rizzo and Ruanne produced club remixes of the song, which received a wider release on promotional singles than commercial singles and received spins in nightclubs worldwide—the song reached the top five on the US Billboard Hot Dance Club Play.

=== Promotion ===
The song's video, set to the RJ Janman remix, was shot in Los Angeles on 8 March 2003 by director Sanaa Hamri, and features cameo appearances by Randy Jackson, Dave Navarro, Evan Marriott (as a helicopter pilot/bodyguard) and model Damon Willis. The single's video is based on the 1979 film The Rose, which featured a rock star (played by Bette Midler) who struggles to find happiness as she goes from her rough "rock and roll" lifestyle to her final high-profile concert.

On 7 December 2002, Carey performed the song along with "Through the Rain" and "My All" in front of a crowd of 50,000 people, at the closing concert of the Mexican Teletón, which took place in the country's Azteca Stadium. Announced as the concert's "star", she performed in a black dress.

=== Track listing and formats ===
- European CD single
1. "Bringin' On the Heartbreak" (Mainstream Version) – 4:13
2. "Miss You" (feat. Jadakiss) – 5:09
- European enhanced CD single
1. "Bringin' On the Heartbreak" (Mainstream Version) – 4:13
2. "Miss You" (feat. Jadakiss) – 5:09
3. "Bringin' On the Heartbreak" (Live) – 4:52
4. "Bringin' On the Heartbreak" (Video)
- Bringin' On the Heartbreak EP
1. "Bringin' On the Heartbreak" (Mainstream Version) – 4:11
2. "Bringin' On the Heartbreak" (Mainstream AC Version) – 4:11
3. "Bringin' On the Heartbreak" (Live) – 4:49
4. "Bringin' On the Heartbreak" (Global Soul Club Mix) – 8:35
5. "Bringin' On the Heartbreak" (Global Soul Dub) – 7:33
6. "Bringin' On the Heartbreak" (Global Soul Mix Show) – 7:44
7. "Bringin' On the Heartbreak" (Global Soul Radio Edit) – 4:27
8. "Bringin' On the Heartbreak" (Junior Vasquez Club Mix) – 7:14
9. "Bringin' On the Heartbreak" (Junior Vasquez Extended Mix) – 9:45
10. "Bringin' On the Heartbreak" (Junior Vasquez Radio Edit) – 3:56
11. "Bringin' On the Heartbreak" (Junior Vasquez Mix Show) – 6:28
12. "Bringin' On the Heartbreak" (Ruanne Emmenes Coffee Dub) – 6:11
13. "Bringin' On the Heartbreak" (Ruanne Emmenes Vocal Capture Mix) – 8:47

=== Remixes ===
Global Soul Mixes

- "Bringin' On the Heartbreak" (Global Soul Club Mix) – 8:30
- "Bringin' On the Heartbreak" (Global Soul Mix Show) – 7:38
- "Bringin' On the Heartbreak" (Global Soul Dub) – 7:30
- "Bringin' On the Heartbreak" (Global Soul Radio Edit) – 4:53

Junior Vasquez Mixes

- "Bringin' On the Heartbreak" (Junior Vasquez Club Mix) – 7:11
- "Bringin' On the Heartbreak" (Junior Vasquez Extended Mix) – 9:45
- "Bringin' On the Heartbreak" (Junior Vasquez Radio Edit) – 3:54

Ruanne Emmenes Mixes

- "Bringin' On the Heartbreak" (Ruanne Emmenes Vocal Capture Mix) – 8:45
- "Bringin' On the Heartbreak" (Ruanne's Roasted Coffee Dub) – 6:11

Deep Influence Mixes

- "Bringin' On the Heartbreak" (Deep Influence Anthem) – 11:29
- "Bringin' On the Heartbreak" (Deep Influence Radio) – 4:23

=== Charts ===
Weekly chart performance
Chart (2003)	Peak position
Austria (Ö3 Austria Top 40)	55
Belgium (Ultratip Bubbling Under Flanders)	11
Belgium (Ultratop 50 Wallonia)	40
Switzerland (Schweizer Hitparade)	28
US Dance Club Songs (Billboard) Remixes	5
US Adult Contemporary (Radio & Records)	25

=== Release history ===
List of release dates and formats for "Bringin' On the Heartbreak"
Region	Date	Format	Label(s)	Ref.
United States	June 2, 2003	Contemporary hit radio	MonarC; IDJMG	
United States	June 2, 2003	Adult contemporary radio	MonarC; IDJMG	
United States	June 2, 2003	Hot adult contemporary radio	MonarC; IDJMG	
Italy	October 6, 2003	Digital download	Def Jam	
Belgium	October 10, 2003	CD	Def Jam	
Poland	October 27, 2003	CD	Universal Music Polska	
