= Heaven Is =

1993 single by Def Leppard

Single by Def Leppard

from the album Adrenalize
- B-side: "She's Too Tough"; "Elected" (live); "Let's Get Rocked" (live)
- Released: 18 January 1993
- Genre: Hard rock; glam metal
- Length: 3:37
- Label: Bludgeon Riffola
- Songwriters: Joe Elliott; Phil Collen; Steve Clark; Rick Savage; Robert John "Mutt" Lange
- Producers: Mike Shipley; Def Leppard

Def Leppard singles chronology
"Stand Up (Kick Love Into Motion)" (1992)	"Heaven Is" (1993)	"Tonight" (1993)

Music video
- "Heaven Is" on YouTube

"Heaven Is" is a song by English hard rock band Def Leppard from their fifth album, Adrenalize (1992). The single was released in January 1993 by label Bludgeon Riffola and reached number 13 in the United Kingdom.

== Song information ==
In a statement on the Rock of Ages: The Definitive Collection and Best of Def Leppard compilation albums, the band's lead singer Joe Elliott described the song's backing vocals on the chorus sounded much like The Beach Boys, and said that it was the first time Def Leppard went that far. He also described the song as being "More Queen than Queen". According to Elliott, the guitar riff had existed for years and lead guitarist Phil Collen said that parts of it were taken from the song "Armageddon It".

== Video ==
According to a Joe Elliott statement on the Rock of Ages: The Definitive Collection, Best of Def Leppard and Vault: Def Leppard Greatest Hits (1980-1995) compilation albums, he hated the music video.

== Track listing ==
- CD: Bludgeon Riffola / LEPCD 9 (UK) / 864 731-2 (INT)
1. "Heaven Is"
2. "She's Too Tough"
3. "Elected" (Live) (Alice Cooper cover)
4. "Let's Get Rocked" (Live)

Note: "Elected" was recorded at Tilburg, Netherlands in 1987; "Let's Get Rocked" was recorded at Bonn, Germany on 29 May 1992

- 7": Bludgeon Riffola / LEP 9 (UK) / INT 864 730-7 / Special Edition Autographed Etched Disk
1. "Heaven Is"
2. "She's Too Tough"

Note: This single has the band members autographs on the back side of the disc.

- 12": Bludgeon Riffola / LEPX 9 (UK) / INT 864 731-1 / Picture Disc
1. "Heaven Is"
2. "She's Too Tough"
3. "Let's Get Rocked" (Live)

Note: This 12" single picture disc has the Adrenalize graphic exploding in the cover. On the back side of the picture disc has a picture of Joe Elliott. The back cardboard has the 12" single information and a band picture. Pictures by Ross Halfin. Artwork and Design by Andie Airfix at Satori.

== Charts ==
Chart (1993)	Peak position
Ireland (IRMA)	24
UK Singles (Official Charts)	13
UK Airplay (Music Week)	16
