= The Law (English band) =

English rock band

- Genres: Rock
- Years active: 1991–1992
- Labels: Verve, Atlantic
- Past members: Kenney Jones; Paul Rodgers; Pino Palladino; Jim Barber; John Staehely; John Young

The Law were an English rock group formed in 1991 by singer Paul Rodgers (ex-Free, Bad Company and The Firm) and drummer Kenney Jones (ex-Small Faces/Faces and The Who). They intended to use different supporting musicians, to allow Rodgers to pursue whatever style he wished. They assembled a core band of studio musicians, consisting of Jim Barber (whose credits include The Rolling Stones, Ruby Turner and Mick Jagger's solo album Primitive Cool) as the main guitarist, second guitarist John Staehely (ex-Spirit and Jo Jo Gunne) and bassist Pino Palladino (formerly of Paul Young's and Jools Holland's bands), with guest spots by guitarists such as David Gilmour, Bryan Adams and Chris Rea.

The band produced the Billboard number 2 AOR Chart hit "Laying Down the Law", written by Rodgers, but the group's only album peaked at number 126 on the Billboard 200 chart. An album of outtakes from the first album has been released as a bootleg, often referred to as The Law II.

The Law – joined by John Young on keyboards – played just one show: at Milton Keynes Bowl, supporting ZZ Top and Bryan Adams. "That was completely barmy," reflected Rodgers. "Kenney and I… couldn't wait to get on the road, but it never happened. I sat waiting for the phone to ring. We even had to twist arms just to get that show – much to the chagrin of some of the other bands that day."

== Discography ==
=== Albums ===
List of albums, with selected chart positions
Title	Year	Peak chart positions		
Title	Year	US	UK	CAN
The Law	1991	126	61	53

=== Singles ===
List of singles, with selected chart positions
Title	Year	Peak chart positions		Album
Title	Year	US Main.	CAN	Album
"Laying Down the Law"	1991	2	68	The Law
"Miss You in a Heartbeat"	1991	38	90	The Law

== Unreleased album (The Law II) ==
- "Too Much Is Not Enough" (Joe Lynn Turner/Bob Held/Al Greenwood)
- "Wanna Make Love to You" (Jerry Lynn Williams)
- "Message of Love"
- "Hold On"
- "Alibi" (Jerry Lynn Williams)
- "Loaded Dice"
- "Check Mate"
- "Strictly Off the Record"
- "Laying Down the Law" (rough version; Paul Rodgers)

These songs are left-overs from the released album sessions. Notably, both "Wanna Make Love to You" and "Alibi" were previously recorded by Eric Clapton (as "I Wanna Make Love to You", a 1986 B-side (released in 1988 on Crossroads, and "No Alibis", on his Journeyman album, respectively). Also, Too Much Is Not Enough was previously recorded by Joe Lynn Turner in the mid-eighties for the unreleased follow-up of Rescue You and he recorded it again with Deep Purple on their Slaves and Masters album. In 1998 he recorded it again on his solo album Hurry Up and Wait. The original version can be found on the Demos '88–91' bootleg.
