= Make Love Like a Man =

1992 single by Def Leppard

Single by Def Leppard

from the album Adrenalize
- B-side: "Miss You in a Heartbeat"; "Action"; "Two Steps Behind" (acoustic)
- Released: 15 June 1992
- Length: 4:13
- Label: Bludgeon Riffola
- Songwriters: Joe Elliott; Phil Collen; Steve Clark; Robert John "Mutt" Lange
- Producers: Mike Shipley; Def Leppard

Def Leppard singles chronology
"Let's Get Rocked" (1992)	"Make Love Like a Man" (1992)	"Have You Ever Needed Someone So Bad" (1992)

"Make Love Like a Man" is a song by English hard rock band Def Leppard from their fifth studio album, Adrenalize (1992). The song reached No. 3 on the Album Rock Tracks chart and No. 36 on the Billboard Hot 100 chart in the United States.

== Background ==
In a Joe Elliott statement on the Vault compilation album, he stated that this song was not about Def Leppard trying to be "MACHO", and were just trying to be funny about the content of this song. The statement only appears on the UK version of Vault, as the track is not included on the American version. Elliott made a similar note in the album booklet for the later Best Of compilation, joking that "everyone thought we were turning into Manowar" and explaining that the band had come to terms with the then-recent death of guitarist Steve Clark on the album track "White Lightning" and wanted to have a lighter song on the album.

Elliott once said that he would rather not play this song live any more as the lyrics "were a nod too stupid". Despite this, the song still featured occasionally as the first song of the encore during the 2018 Hysteria Tour.

== Music video ==
The music video was the first to feature Vivian Campbell, who had joined the band when the album was released so he does not appear on the recording.

== Track listings ==
- CD: Bludgeon Riffola / LEPCB 7 (UK) / 866 991-2 (INT)
1. "Make Love Like a Man"
2. "Miss You in a Heartbeat"
3. "Action"
4. "Two Steps Behind" (acoustic)
- 12": Bludgeon Riffola / LEPXP 7 (UK) / INT 866 991-1 / picture disc

This 12" single picture disc has the Adrenalize graphic inside an eye in the cover. On the back side of the picture disc has the picture of Phil Collen. The back cardboard has the 12" single information and a band picture. Pictures by Ross Halfin. Artwork and design by Andie Airfix at Satori.

1. "Make Love Like a Man"
2. "Miss You in a Heartbeat"
3. "Two Steps Behind" (acoustic)
- Cassette single: Mercury / 864 038-4 (US)
1. "Make Love Like a Man"
2. "Miss You in a Heartbeat"
- Cassette single: Bludgeon Riffola / 866 990-4 / LEPMC 7 (UK)
1. "Make Love Like a Man"
2. "Miss You in a Heartbeat"

== Charts ==
Chart (1992)	Peak position
Australia (ARIA)	22
Canada Top Singles (RPM)	23
Germany (GfK)	95
Ireland (IRMA)	10
Israel (Israeli Singles Chart)	2
New Zealand (Recorded Music NZ)	49
Switzerland (Schweizer Hitparade)	40
UK Singles (Official Charts)	12
UK Airplay (Music Week)	15
US Billboard Hot 100	36
US Mainstream Rock Airplay (Billboard)	3
US Cash Box Top 100	28

== Release history ==
Region	Date	Format(s)	Label(s)	Ref(s).
Australia	15 June 1992	CD; cassette	Bludgeon Riffola	
United Kingdom	15 June 1992	7-inch vinyl; CD; cassette	Bludgeon Riffola	
United Kingdom	22 June 1992	12-inch vinyl	Bludgeon Riffola	
Japan	25 July 1992	Mini-CD; maxi-CD	Mercury; Bludgeon Riffola	
