= Yeah! (Def Leppard album) =

Studio album by Def Leppard
- Released: 23 May 2006
- Recorded: 2003–2006
- Genre: Hard rock
- Length: 53:43
- Labels: Mercury; Island (US/Canada)
- Producers: Def Leppard; Ronan McHugh

Def Leppard chronology
Rock of Ages: The Definitive Collection (2005)	Yeah! (2006)	Songs from the Sparkle Lounge (2008)

Singles from Yeah!
- 1. "No Matter What" Released: May 2005; 2. "Rock On" Released: April 2006; 3. "20th Century Boy" Released: July 2006

Professional ratings
Review scores
Source	Rating
AllMusic	4.5/5 stars
Entertainment Weekly	C+
Gigwise	1/5 stars
The Irish Times	3/5 stars
musicOMH	2/5 stars
Rolling Stone	3/5 stars

Yeah! is the ninth studio album by English rock band Def Leppard. It is the first cover album by the band. It was originally intended to be released on 20 September 2005, but it was announced on 31 March 2006 that the album would be released on 23 May 2006. The album charted at No. 16 on the Billboard 200 and No. 52 on the UK Albums Chart.

== Artwork ==
The accompanying booklet contains photographs of the band members recreating classic images from 1970s album art.

- Rick Savage – Freddie Mercury from the album Queen II
- Vivian Campbell – Marc Bolan from T. Rex's Electric Warrior
- Joe Elliott – David Bowie from the rear cover of The Rise and Fall of Ziggy Stardust and the Spiders from Mars
- Rick Allen – Lou Reed, Transformer
- Phil Collen – The Stooges, Raw Power

There are also four group photographs in the CD booklet – on the cover, the centre, inside back cover and the back cover.

- The inside back cover (back of the CD holder) has a picture with the original triangle Def Leppard logo (from the On Through the Night album), with a shaft of light passing through it and creating a rainbow, a la the cover of Pink Floyd's The Dark Side of the Moon.

== Reception ==
Rating the album 4.5 out of 5, Stephen Thomas Erlewine of AllMusic praised Yeah! as the band's best effort since Hysteria, noting how the band "no longer sound as slick and calculated as they did on their albums after Hysteria; they sound alive and vigorous, making a convincing case that they're now their own best producers." Erlewine concluded that "few bands could achieve an artistic comeback via a covers album, but as this glorious record proves, there are few bands like Def Leppard."

In a 3 out of 5 review, Andy Greene of Rolling Stone wrote that Yeah! was the band's "most convincing album in fourteen years", citing "Rock On" and "Stay With Me" as highlights. He concluded by saying that "none of the arrangements veer far from the originals, but they don't need to - it's good enough to just hear the band having fun and to see where all the Hysteria came from."

== Track listing ==
Yeah! track listing
No.	Title	Writer(s)	Original artist	Length
1.	"20th Century Boy"	Marc Bolan	T. Rex	3:41
2.	"Rock On"	David Essex	David Essex	2:53
3.	"Hanging on the Telephone"	Jack Lee	The Nerves	2:23
4.	"Waterloo Sunset"	Ray Davies	The Kinks	3:38
5.	"Hell Raiser"	Mike Chapman; Nicky Chinn	Sweet	3:20
6.	"10538 Overture"	Jeff Lynne	Electric Light Orchestra	4:31
7.	"Street Life"	Bryan Ferry	Roxy Music	3:26
8.	"Drive-In Saturday"	David Bowie	David Bowie	4:07
9.	"Little Bit of Love"	Paul Rodgers; Paul Kossoff; Andy Fraser; Simon Kirke	Free	2:34
10.	"The Golden Age of Rock 'n' Roll"	Ian Hunter	Mott the Hoople	3:28
11.	"No Matter What"	Pete Ham	Badfinger	2:57
12.	"He's Gonna Step on You Again"	John Kongos; Christos Demetriou	John Kongos	4:05
13.	"Don't Believe a Word"	Phil Lynott	Thin Lizzy	2:19
14.	"Stay with Me"	Rod Stewart; Ronnie Wood	Faces	4:30

=== Bonus material ===
iTunes bonus track (initial release only)
No.	Title	Writer(s)	Original artist	Length
15.	"How Does It Feel"	Noddy Holder; Jim Lea	Slade	5:20

Target bonus tracks
No.	Title	Writer(s)	Original artist	Length
15.	"Action" (Live)	Brian Connolly; Andy Scott; Steve Priest; Mick Tucker	Sweet	4:03
16.	"When I'm Dead and Gone"	Benny Gallagher; Graham Lyle	McGuinness Flint	3:17

Best Buy bonus tracks
No.	Title	Writer(s)	Original artist	Length
15.	"No Matter What" (Live)	Pete Ham	Badfinger	2:58
16.	"Winter Song"	Alan Hull	Lindisfarne	4:35

Japanese bonus tracks
No.	Title	Writer(s)	Original artist	Length
15.	"American Girl"	Tom Petty	Tom Petty and the Heartbreakers	3:34
16.	"Search and Destroy"	Iggy Pop; James Williamson	The Stooges	3:27

Wal-Mart bonus EP (sold separately)
No.	Title	Writer(s)	Original artist	Length
1.	"American Girl"	Petty	Tom Petty and the Heartbreakers	3:34
2.	"Backstage Interview No. 1"			3:12
3.	"Search and Destroy"	Pop; Williamson	The Stooges	3:27
4.	"Backstage Interview No. 2"			2:01
5.	"Space Oddity"	David Bowie	David Bowie	5:27
6.	"Backstage Interview No. 3"			2:43
7.	"Dear Friends"	Brian May	Queen	1:28
8.	"Heartbeat"	Jobriath	Jobriath	2:44

- All of bonus song recordings were later included in Yeah! II, a bonus album of cover songs released as part of The Collection: Volume Three box set released in 2021.

== Personnel ==
- Joe Elliott – lead vocals, piano, all instruments on "Space Oddity", art direction on inner sleeve
- Phil Collen – guitar, backing vocals, lead vocals on "Stay with Me" and "Search and Destroy", all instruments on "Search and Destroy"
- Vivian Campbell – guitar, backing vocals
- Rick Savage – bass, backing vocals, lead vocals and all instruments on "Dear Friends"
- Rick Allen – drums, percussion

=== Additional personnel ===
- Emm Gryner—backing vocals, piano on "The Golden Age of Rock 'N' Roll"
- Ian Hunter—spoken intro on "The Golden Age of Rock 'N' Roll"
- Justin Hawkins – backing vocals on "Hell Raiser"
- Marc Danzeisen – drums and harmony/backing vocals on "American Girl"
- t42design – artwork
- Vartan – art direction on cover
- Clay Patrick McBride – photography on cover art, back cover, trays
- Mick Rock – photography on inner sleeve

== Charts ==
Chart performance for Yeah!
Chart (2006)	Peak position
Australian Albums (ARIA)	95
French Albums (SNEP)	161
German Albums (Offizielle Top 100)	73
Japanese Albums (Oricon)	48
Scottish Albums (Official Charts)	4
Swedish Albums (Sverigetopplistan)	25
Swiss Albums (Schweizer Hitparade)	57
UK Albums (Official Charts)	52
UK Rock & Metal Albums (Official Charts)	4
US Billboard 200	16
