= Miss You in a Heartbeat =

1993 single by Def Leppard

Single by Def Leppard

from the album Retro Active
- Released: December 1993
- Length: 4:04
- Label: Mercury
- Songwriter: Phil Collen
- Producers: Def Leppard; Pete Woodroffe

Def Leppard singles chronology
"Desert Song" (1993)	"Miss You in a Heartbeat" (1993)	"Action" (1994)

Music video
- "Miss You in a Heartbeat" on YouTube

"Miss You in a Heartbeat" is a song by English hard rock band Def Leppard, released in December 1993, by Mercury Records, from their 1993 compilation album Retro Active. The single peaked at number 39 on the US Billboard Hot 100 and was Def Leppard's last American top 40 hit on the Billboard Hot 100, as of 2026.

== Background ==
Three versions of the song appear on Retro Active; the acoustic version (4:04), which was released as the single, the electric version (4:56), which was one of the bonus tracks for the Japanese pressing of Adrenalize along with "She's Too Tough", before both were remixed for Retro Active, and the piano version which is featured as a hidden track on the Retro Active album. It is played after the electric version of "Two Steps Behind".

Although "Miss You in a Heartbeat" was written by Def Leppard guitarist Phil Collen, it was initially recorded and released by the Law on their 1991 self-titled debut.

== Track listing ==
- Cassette single: Bludgeon Riffola / Polygram / Mercury / 858 080-4 (US)
1. "Miss You in a Heartbeat"
2. "Let's Get Rocked" (live)
- CD single: Bludgeon Riffola / Nippon Phonogram / PHCR-8302 (Japan)
1. "Miss You in a Heartbeat" (band acoustic version)
2. "Two Steps Behind" (Joe's demo)
3. "She's Too Tough" (Joe's demo)
4. "Miss You in a Heartbeat" (acoustic, acoustic version)

Note: In Germany, the CD single was also double packed with the In the Clubs... In Your Face EP in 1994 as a maxi-single.

== Charts ==
Chart (1994)	Peak position
Canada Retail Singles (The Record)	4
Canada Top Singles (RPM)	19
Iceland (Íslenski Listinn Topp 40)	18
US Billboard Hot 100	39
US Pop Airplay (Billboard)	17
US Cash Box Top 100	37
