= Two Steps Behind =

1993 single by Def Leppard

Single by Def Leppard

from the album Retro Active and Last Action Hero: Music from the Original Motion Picture
- B-side: "Tonight" (acoustic version); "SMC"
- Released: 24 August 1993
- Recorded: 1989 (Joe's demo/original electric version); April 1992 (acoustic version); 7–11 June 1993 (new parts to electric version)
- Genre: Rock
- Length: 4:58 (Joe's demo); 4:11 (Adrenalize acoustic B-side version); 4:16 (acoustic version/Retro Active/Last Action Hero Soundtrack mix); 4:29 (electric version)
- Label: Bludgeon Riffola
- Songwriter: Joe Elliott
- Producers: Pete Woodroofe; Joe Elliott; Phil Collen; Vivian Campbell; Rick Savage

Def Leppard singles chronology
"I Wanna Touch U" (1993)	"Two Steps Behind" (1993)	"Desert Song" (1993)

Music video
- "Two Steps Behind" on YouTube

"Two Steps Behind" is a song by English hard rock band Def Leppard from their 1993 compilation album Retro Active and the soundtrack to the film Last Action Hero. It reached number five on the US Billboard Album Rock Tracks chart, numbers 12 and 10 on the Billboard Hot 100 and Cash Box Top 100, and number 32 on the UK Singles Chart. The music video was directed by Wayne Isham. In the 1993 Metal Edge Readers' Choice Awards, the song was voted "Song of the Year" and "Best Song from a Movie Soundtrack".

== Background and recording ==
Def Leppard recorded two different versions of the song - an electric version and an acoustic version - the widely released one was the acoustic version which featured on the greatest hits Vault. The widely released acoustic version differs from the original B-side, as it featured the addition of strings by Michael Kamen, for usage on Last Action Hero.

The song was composed and demoed by lead singer Joe Elliott in 1989 during the writing and recording sessions for the band's fifth album Adrenalize. The track was shelved for three years until it resurfaced following a late-night acoustic jamming session with the Hothouse Flowers in March 1992, which yielded three B-side tracks. When Elliott suggested recording "Two Steps Behind", Collen suggested that it be recorded as an acoustic version. The track was recorded in a few hours in April 1992 and was released as the B-side to "Make Love Like a Man" in the UK.

Later in 1993, the producers of the film Last Action Hero contacted the band requesting a new song for the film's soundtrack. As the band were on tour at the time, they were unable to record brand new material for the soundtrack. Instead, they sent the producers the multitracks to the acoustic version of "Two Steps Behind". The track was remixed and conductor Michael Kamen added an orchestral string treatment to the song. The inclusion of the song on the film's soundtrack inspired the band to create the compilation album Retro Active from B-sides and unreleased material, and record new parts to the electric version of the song on 7–11 June.

Along with the song "Let's Get Rocked" from their 1992 album Adrenalize, this is one of only two songs by the band released after the 1980s that is still regularly performed live on nearly all of the bands' tours. Def Leppard's acoustic version also features on the CMT Crossroads DVD with Taylor Swift as a bonus feature.

== Critical reception ==
Eduardo Rivadavia, reviewing Retro Active for AllMusic, called "Two Steps Behind" along with "Miss You in a Heartbeat" "solid, but hardly groundbreaking ballads" and one of the album picks.

== Commercial performance ==
"Two Steps Behind" reached No. 12 on the US Billboard Hot 100 and number five on the US Billboard Album Rock Tracks chart. It also peaked at number 29 on the Billboard Adult Contemporary chart.

== Music video ==
The music video for "Two Steps Behind" was directed by American director Wayne Isham, and the approximate shoot date was 10 July 1993. This video shows the band playing in car park, Joe Elliott singing on the street while all the people around go backwards and live footage at a concert. The live footage was shot on Irvine Meadows, California. The video was aired in August 1993.

== Track listings ==
- CD (UK)
1. "Two Steps Behind"
2. "Tonight" (acoustic version)
3. "SMC"
- Cassette (US)
1. "Two Steps Behind"
2. "Tonight" (acoustic version)

== Charts ==
=== Weekly charts ===
Weekly chart performance for "Two Steps Behind"
Chart (1993–1994)	Peak position
Australia (ARIA)	33
Austria (Ö3 Austria Top 40)	29
Canada Top Singles (RPM)	5
Canada Adult Contemporary (RPM)	23
Europe (Eurochart Hot 100)	68
Europe (European Hit Radio)	29
Finland Airplay (IFPI Finland)	35
Germany (GfK)	66
Iceland (Íslenski Listinn Topp 40)	12
Ireland (IRMA)	26
Israel (Israeli Singles Chart)	9
Lithuania (M-1)	12
Mexico International (Notitas Musicales)	2
Netherlands (Single Top 100)	43
New Zealand (Recorded Music NZ)	34
Portugal (AFP)	5
Quebec Airplay (ADISQ)	5
Sweden (Sverigetopplistan)	21
UK Singles (Official Charts)	32
UK Airplay (Music Week)	33
UK Rock & Metal Singles (ERA)	3
US Billboard Hot 100	12
US Adult Contemporary (Billboard)	29
US Mainstream Rock (Billboard)	5
US Pop Airplay (Billboard)	5
US Cash Box Top 100	10

=== Year-end charts ===
Year-end chart performance for "Two Steps Behind"
Chart (1993)	Position
Canada Top Singles (RPM)	40
US Billboard Hot 100	100

== Release history ==
Release dates and formats for "Two Steps Behind"
Region	Date	Format(s)	Label(s)	Ref(s).
United States	24 August 1993	Cassette	Columbia	
United Kingdom	6 September 1993	CD; cassette	Bludgeon Riffola	
Australia	4 October 1993	CD; cassette	Bludgeon Riffola	
Japan	20 December 1993	CD	Bludgeon Riffola	
