= Stand Up (Kick Love into Motion) =

1992 single by Def Leppard

Single by Def Leppard

from the album Adrenalize
- B-side: "She's Too Tough"; "Elected" (live); "Let's Get Rocked" (Live)
- Released: 1992
- Length: 4:31
- Label: Mercury; Bludgeon Riffola
- Songwriters: Steve Clark; Phil Collen; Joe Elliott; Robert John "Mutt" Lange
- Producers: Mike Shipley; Def Leppard

Def Leppard singles chronology
| "Have You Ever Needed Someone So Bad" (1992) | "Stand Up (Kick Love into Motion)" (1992) | "Heaven Is" (1993) |

Music video
- "Stand Up (Kick Love into Motion)" on YouTube

"Stand Up (Kick Love into Motion)" is a song by English hard rock band Def Leppard, released as the fourth single from their fifth studio album, Adrenalize (1992). The song reached No. 1 on the US Billboard Album Rock Tracks charts and number 34 on the Billboard Hot 100.

== Background ==
Phil Collen, according to a statement on the Rock of Ages and Best Of compilations albums, says that this song was written at Wisseloord Studios while Def Leppard was recording the album Hysteria. It was written by Collen and Steve Clark. This song was not included on Hysteria, since the band thought it was very similar to the song "Hysteria".

== Music video ==
The music video was directed by Matt Mahurin, and features Def Leppard managers Peter Mensch and Cliff Burnstein as a business man and baseball player, respectively. Filming took place on 26 October 1992. The outdoors footage was captured near Central Park in New York City. A censored version blurs the naked couple on the close up scene.

== Track listing ==
CD: Bludgeon Riffola / 862 027-2 (Australia) / limited edition digipak

1. "Stand Up (Kick Love into Motion)"
2. "She's Too Tough"
3. "Elected" (live) (Alice Cooper cover)
4. "Let's Get Rocked" (live)

== Charts ==
=== Weekly charts ===
| Chart (1992–1993) | Peak position |
|---|---|
| Australia (ARIA) | 55 |
| Canada Top Singles (RPM) | 11 |
| US Billboard Hot 100 | 34 |
| US Mainstream Rock Airplay (Billboard) | 1 |
| US Pop Airplay (Billboard) | 22 |
| US Cash Box Top 100 | 35 |

=== Year-end charts ===
| Chart (1993) | Position |
|---|---|
| Canada Top Singles (RPM) | 94 |
| US Album Rock Tracks (Billboard) | 37 |

== Release history ==
| Region | Date | Format(s) | Label(s) | Ref. |
|---|---|---|---|---|
| United States | 1992 | 7-inch vinyl; cassette | Mercury | |
| Australia | 21 March 1993 | CD; cassette | Bludgeon Riffola | |
