= Steve Clark =

English guitarist (1960–1991)

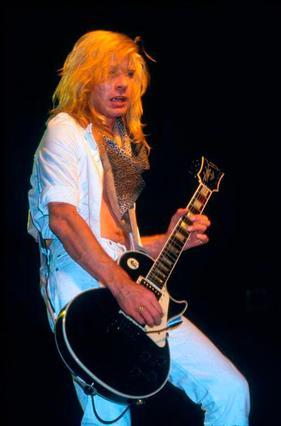
- Clark during the Hysteria World Tour

Background information
- Born: Stephen Maynard Clark; 23 April 1960; Wisewood, Sheffield, England
- Died: 8 January 1991 (aged 30) Chelsea, London, England
- Genres: Heavy metal; glam metal; hard rock
- Occupations: Guitarist
- Instruments: Guitar; vocals
- Years active: 1977–1991
- Formerly of: Def Leppard

Stephen Maynard Clark (23 April 1960 – 8 January 1991) was an English musician. He was a guitarist and songwriter for the hard rock band Def Leppard until his death in 1991. In 2007, Clark was ranked No. 11 on Classic Rock Magazine's "100 Wildest Guitar Heroes". In 2019, he was posthumously inducted into the Rock and Roll Hall of Fame as a member of Def Leppard.

== Early life ==
Stephen Maynard Clark was born 23 April 1960 to Barrie and Beryl (née Beckingham) Clark. He was raised in Wisewood, Sheffield. From an early age, he showed an interest in music, attending his first concert featuring Cliff Richard and the Shadows at age six. At 11, he received his first guitar which was purchased by his father on the condition that he learn to play. Clark studied classical guitar for a year before he first heard the music of Jimmy Page and Led Zeppelin at a friend's house.

When Clark left school, his first employer was the engineering firm GEC Traction, where he worked as a lathe operator. He was three years into a four-year apprenticeship with the firm at the time Def Leppard was signed to a record deal with Phonogram Records.

== Career ==
Before joining Def Leppard in 1978, Clark played cover songs with his band Electric Chicken in Sheffield. Around that time, he met Pete Willis (Def Leppard's original guitarist and founder) at a technical college. Willis spotted Clark reading a guitar book and asked if he played. He then invited Clark to come and audition for his band, as they were looking to add a second guitarist. Clark never showed up, but when Willis and singer Joe Elliott bumped into Clark again at a Judas Priest concert, Willis re-issued his invitation. Clark finally came down to their rehearsal room and joined Def Leppard in January 1978. According to Elliott in Behind the Music, Clark auditioned for Def Leppard by playing all of Lynyrd Skynyrd's "Free Bird" without accompaniment. While a member of Def Leppard, Clark wrote or co-wrote almost all of the band's songs. Clark and Pete Willis shared lead guitar duties, and Clark was nicknamed "The Riffmaster" due to his talent and ability to come up with guitar riffs.

Toward the end of the Pyromania recording sessions in 1982, Pete Willis was asked to leave the band, and guitarist Phil Collen was recruited to replace him. Clark and Collen developed the trademark dual-guitar sound of Def Leppard. Part of their success as a duo was attributed to their ability to swap between rhythm and lead guitar, with both playing lead or both doing rhythm within the same song. The fact that they came from entirely different musical backgrounds also contributed to their unique guitar partnership. Clark was a classically trained musician who knew the rules of music and could read and write music and understood the theory and science of the art, as well as studying/being influenced by Jimmy Page and Led Zeppelin; whereas Collen, like Willis, was self-taught and developed his fast, alternate-picking technique from studying Al Di Meola and listening to jazz players. Clark once said, "I do read and write and I know the rules of music which is great in a two-guitar band because we're so different in our approach to playing. Phil will play something if it sounds right, whereas I look at things and say: 'it's wrong to play that note; it's not musically correct'."

Clark primarily played Gibson Guitars during his career and signed an endorsement with Gibson in 1987. Gibson made some custom-specification guitars for Clark. He was occasionally seen playing other guitars, including a Fender Stratocaster for the song and video "Love Bites". Clark would also use Fenders in the studio occasionally, due to their unique sound.

Although his name appears on many songwriting credits for Def Leppard's 1992 album, Adrenalize, he did not contribute much to the recording of the album. In the liner notes of the Adrenalize deluxe edition, Joe Elliott claims that a few riffs Clark had demoed were used in a couple of places on the album. His only other contribution was an occasional approval of what the rest of the band was working on, referring to it as "cool". The song "White Lightning" described the effects of Clark's alcohol and drug addictions. However, the deluxe rerelease of Adrenalize features a demo of the song "Tonight", which Clark performed in, having been recorded in 1988, intended to be a B-side for Hysteria.

Clark was involved in the recording of the demo for the band's 1995 single "When Love & Hate Collide", just days before his 1991 death. The song at the time was reminiscent of the Hysteria and Adrenalize sound as opposed to the newer sound of the next album Slang. The demo of this song contains the final solo Clark ever performed. A demo of Clark's solo was found for the song "Stand Up (Kick Love into Motion)" but was never integrated into any official material. Tesla, who opened for Def Leppard on the Hysteria tour, recorded a tribute to Clark entitled "Song & Emotion (To Our Friend, Steve 'Steamin' Clark)" for their album Psychotic Supper.

In 2007, Clark was ranked No. 11 on Classic Rock Magazine's "100 Wildest Guitar Heroes". In 2019, he was posthumously inducted into the Rock and Roll Hall of Fame as a member of Def Leppard.

== Personal life ==
Clark suffered from severe anxiety prior to performances.

Clark was engaged to an American model, Lorelei Shellist, the two having been together seven years. Shellist revealed in her autobiography, Runway Runaway, that Clark's alcoholism played a major role in their breakup.

Clark was close friends with Phil Collen. The two became known as the "Terror Twins" in recognition of their friendship and their alcohol-fuelled antics offstage. Collen stopped drinking in the late 1980s.

In the winter of 1989, Clark was found unconscious inside a bar in Minneapolis and was rushed to Hazelden Addiction Treatment Center. His bandmates all subsequently flew to Minneapolis to be with him. There, a doctor urged them to convince Clark to enter rehab after he registered a blood alcohol level of 0.59; by contrast, Led Zeppelin's John Bonham had registered a blood alcohol level of 0.41 when he died in 1980. Collen and others held an intervention to urge him to cease his alcohol abuse. Clark agreed to enter a rehabilitation centre with the promise that his spot in Def Leppard would be held for him until he was healthy. He was placed on a six-month leave of absence from the band.

While in rehabilitation in Arizona, Clark met a recovering heroin addict named Janie Dean, and the pair agreed to help each other with their addictions. They soon became engaged. Clark left rehabilitation before completing the program and resumed drinking. According to Collen, it became "almost impossible" to keep Clark sober after Dean entered his life, and almost as difficult to keep track of his whereabouts.

=== Death ===
On 8 January 1991, Janie Dean found Clark dead at home in his London apartment. He was 30 years old. The postmortem revealed that the cause of death was respiratory failure caused by a lethal mixture of alcohol and prescription drugs. At the time of his death, Clark had a blood alcohol level of .30 and morphine in his system.

Clark was buried at Wisewood Cemetery in Loxley, Sheffield, near the Clark family residence.

== Discography ==
=== Studio albums ===
- On Through the Night
- High 'n' Dry
- Pyromania
- Hysteria
- Adrenalize (songwriting and demos only)

=== Compilation albums ===
- Retro Active
- Vault: Def Leppard Greatest Hits (1980–1995)
- Best of Def Leppard
- Rock of Ages: The Definitive Collection

=== Live albums ===
- Viva! Hysteria Tribute (Intro to Gods of War taken from Live: In the Round, in Your Face)

=== Extended plays ===
- The Def Leppard E.P.

=== Videos ===
- Historia
- Live: In the Round, in Your Face
- Visualize
- Video Archive
- Best of the Videos
- Rock of Ages – The DVD Collection
- Viva! Hysteria Tribute (Intro to Gods of War taken from Live: In the Round, in Your Face)
