= Tonight (Def Leppard song) =

1993 single by Def Leppard

Single by Def Leppard

from the album Adrenalize
- B-side: "Now I'm Here" (live); "Hysteria" (live); "Photograph" (live); "Pour Some Sugar On Me" (live); "She's Too Tough"
- Released: March 1993
- Length: 4:03
- Label: Bludgeon Riffola; Mercury
- Songwriters: Joe Elliott; Phil Collen; Steve Clark; Rick Savage; Robert John "Mutt" Lange
- Producers: Mike Shipley; Def Leppard

Def Leppard singles chronology
"Heaven Is" (1993)	"Tonight" (1993)	"I Wanna Touch U" (1993)

Music video
- "Tonight" on YouTube

"Tonight" is a song by English hard rock band Def Leppard from their fifth album, Adrenalize (1992). It was released as the sixth international single from Adrenalize and the fifth single in both the US and UK, released by Bludgeon Riffola and Mercury. In the US, the song reached number 13 on the Billboard Album Rock Tracks charts and number 62 on the Billboard Hot 100. It also peaked at number 34 on the UK Singles Chart.

== Song information ==
The song was first written and recorded in 1984/85 during the Hysteria sessions, but lost out to "Love Bites" in the end as it was not finished. "Tonight" was subsequently re-recorded in February 1987 as a potential B-side and once again in May 1988 during the Hysteria tour, but neither version seemed to work so both were shelved. It was re-recorded once again during the Adrenalize sessions with a few minor changes in the arrangement.

== Music video ==
The accompanying music video for "Tonight" was directed by American film director and music video director Wayne Isham.

== Track listings ==
- CD: Bludgeon Riffola / 862 231-2 (Germany)
1. "Tonight"
2. "Now I'm Here" (live) (recorded at Wembley Stadium, London, 20 April 1992)
3. "Photograph" (live) (recorded at the Biskuithalle in Bonn, Germany, 29 May 1992)
4. "Tonight" (demo) (recorded 5 May 1988)
- CD: Mercury / 862 017-2 (US)
1. "Tonight"
2. "She's Too Tough"
3. "Pour Some Sugar on Me" (live)
- Cassette single: Mercury / 862 016-4 (US)
1. "Tonight"
2. "She's Too Tough"
- 7-inch: Mercury / 862 016-7 (US)
1. "Tonight"
2. "She's Too Tough"
- 7-inch: Bludgeon Riffola - Mercury / LEP 10 (UK)
1. "Tonight"
2. "Now I'm Here" (live)
- 12-inch: Bludgeon Riffola - Mercury / LEPX 11 (UK) / 862 287-1 (international) / picture disc
1. "Tonight"
2. "Now I'm Here" (live)
3. "Hysteria" (live)

Note: This picture disc has on the cover same graphic as the Adrenalize album, but in a small size. On the back of the disc, there is the picture of Rick Allen. On the cardboard that comes with the disc, there is a band picture and the track listing. Pictures by Ross Halfin.

- CD: Bludgeon Riffola - Mercury / LEPCD 10 (UK)
1. "Tonight"
2. "Now I'm Here" (live)
3. "Photograph" (live)
- CD: Bludgeon Riffola - Mercury / LEPCB 10 (UK)
1. "Tonight"
2. "Pour Some Sugar on Me" (live)
3. "Tonight" (demo)

== Charts ==
Chart (1993)	Peak position
Canada Top Singles (RPM)	50
Europe (Eurochart Hot 100)	80
UK Singles (Official Charts)	34
UK Airplay (Music Week)	33
US Billboard Hot 100	62
US Mainstream Rock Airplay (Billboard)	13
US Cash Box Top 100	59
US Contemporary Hit Radio (Radio and Records)	23

== Release history ==
Region	Date	Format(s)	Label(s)	Ref.
United States	March 1993	7-inch vinyl; CD; cassette	Mercury	
United Kingdom	19 April 1993	7-inch vinyl; CD; cassette	Bludgeon Riffola	
Japan	25 June 1993	CD	Mercury	
