= Adrenalize =

Studio album by Def Leppard
- Released: 30 March 1992
- Recorded: 1988–1990 (preliminary recordings); 1991–1992
- Studios: Wisseloord Studios, Hilversum; Studio 150, Amsterdam; Joe's Garage, Dublin
- Genres: Glam metal; hard rock
- Length: 45:22
- Labels: Mercury; Bludgeon Riffola
- Producers: Mike Shipley; Def Leppard

Def Leppard chronology
Hysteria (1987)	Adrenalize (1992)	Retro Active (1993)

Singles from Adrenalize
- 1. "Let's Get Rocked" Released: 16 March 1992; 2. "Make Love Like a Man" Released: 15 June 1992; 3. "Have You Ever Needed Someone So Bad" Released: 31 August 1992; 4. "Stand Up (Kick Love into Motion)" Released: December 1992; 5. "Heaven Is" Released: 18 January 1993; 6. "Tonight" Released: 16 March 1993

Audio
- "Album" playlist on YouTube

Professional ratings
Review scores
Source	Rating
AllMusic	link
Robert Christgau	(dud)
Rolling Stone	4/5 stars
Sputnik Music	3.5/5 stars

Adrenalize is the fifth studio album by English rock band Def Leppard, released on 30 March 1992 through Mercury Records. It is the first album by the band recorded without guitarist Steve Clark who died in 1991. Although most songs were written and partially demoed before his death, they were largely re-recorded with Phil Collen playing all the guitar parts. It remains the only album recorded by Def Leppard as a four-member band. Spawning six singles, four of them – "Let's Get Rocked", "Make Love Like a Man", "Have You Ever Needed Someone So Bad" and "Stand Up (Kick Love into Motion)" – were major hits.

"Tear It Down" is a re-recording of a song written during a recording session following the completion of the Hysteria album and released as B-side for that album's single "Women" in 1987. The song received radio airplay and was performed by the band live at the 1989 MTV Video Music Awards.

"White Lightning" is dedicated to the memory of Clark, who has writing credits on six of the album's ten tracks.

== Background and recording ==
Def Leppard had faced long delays previously, including the challenge of drummer Rick Allen losing his arm while making their previous album, Hysteria, and while trying to follow up the success, they also faced the prospect of doing so with a different producer. Adrenalize became the band's first album since 1980's On Through the Night not to be produced by Robert John "Mutt" Lange, as Lange was more keen on songwriting than producing when they wanted to start the album. Thus, the band decided to produce the album themselves along with longtime engineer Mike Shipley. The band continued to involve Lange with the writing of the songs, and the band remained in contact with him for advice, hence he was credited as executive producer. At one stage, they decided to involve Lange as producer once again, but the latter was busy working with Bryan Adams, so work continued with Shipley after a few months' break waiting for Lange to be available.

Having done some writing on tour for Hysteria, the band returned to the studio in November 1988 to work on the next album at Wisseloord Studios with Shipley, where they previously worked on Hysteria. However, after experiencing déjà vu there, in Spring 1989, they relocated to Studio 150 in Amsterdam for a further six months to record basic tracks. From these early sessions, only Phil Collen's guitar solos for "Tonight" and "Tear It Down" made it to the final record. The rest of the recording took place at singer Joe Elliott's newly-installed home studio in Dublin. At the same time, guitarist Steve Clark had been suffering from alcohol addiction since 1989, spending six sessions in rehab, so he was in the studio less and less than before. Clark was involved in writing six of the songs on the album, but was given an ultimatum over his alcoholism in September 1990, and put on a six-month leave of absence. Clark died four months later, in January 1991.

The band tried to continue the recording process, going back into the studio the day after Clark's death to cope with the loss, but it took a few months before they were able to work to what they felt was a satisfactory standard. As Elliott reported, 90% of the completed album was recorded between April and December 1991. Two further songs were written, including "White Lightning" and "Let's Get Rocked", the former's lyrics being inspired by Clark following his death.

Instead of replacing Clark with a new member, the band continued recording the album as a four-piece. "We had recorded demos on multitrack," recalled fellow guitarist Phil Collen. "I was sitting there with him when he played the original parts. I could relay that. But it was like playing along to a ghost." As per Elliott, none of Clark's recorded guitar parts were kept on the record; they kept updating the songs and guitar sounds, Collen re-doing all the guitars on the album at least three times. However, according to reports, Clark's guitar was kept posthumously on the outro of "Tear It Down".

"We coped without Mutt quite well…" recalled Joe Elliott. "Mutt was in his studio in Guildford with Bryan Adams and we'd be in Dublin, talking every day… But it wasn't as adventurous as Hysteria. It was more of a rock album, less experimental. It's like with Pink Floyd: to me, Adrenalize was our Wish You Were Here and Hysteria was our Dark Side of the Moon."

== Commercial performance and reception ==
Adrenalize debuted at No. 1 on both the UK Albums Chart and, in the following week, on the U.S. Billboard 200. It stayed at No. 1 of the Billboard chart for five weeks keeping Bruce Springsteen's Human Touch off the top spot, and spent 65 weeks on the charts in total.

The album received mixed reviews: some critics praised its production values and instantly catchy and radio-friendly material, while others called it tired and formulaic. In a four-star review for Rolling Stone, J.D. Considine wrote: "Adrenalize is so relentlessly catchy that it almost seems as if the band is about to abandon its heavy-metal roots for the greener fields of hard pop." Other reviewers also noted the album's less metal sound and pointed out its lack of cohesion. A staff writer for Sputnikmusic said that despite the slick production, its album doesn't match the standard set by the band's previous two records, which they referred to as masterpieces."

Writing in 2009, after Pyromania and Adrenalize have been reissued, Toby Cook of The Quietus said that despite Adrenalize's many flaws, "the record buying public of '92 cared not." Indeed, the record would go on to sell more than seven million copies worldwide, remaining Def Leppard's last studio album to achieve major mainstream success.

== Track listing ==
International edition
No.	Title	Writer(s)	Length
1.	"Let's Get Rocked"	Phil Collen; Joe Elliott; Robert John "Mutt" Lange; Rick Savage	4:56
2.	"Heaven Is"	Steve Clark; Collen; Elliott; Lange; Savage	3:33
3.	"Make Love Like a Man"	Clark; Collen; Elliott; Lange	4:15
4.	"Tonight"	Clark; Collen; Elliott; Lange; Savage	4:03
5.	"White Lightning"	Collen; Elliott; Lange; Savage	7:03
6.	"Stand Up (Kick Love into Motion)"	Clark; Collen; Elliott; Lange	4:32
7.	"Personal Property"	Collen; Elliott; Lange; Savage	4:21
8.	"Have You Ever Needed Someone So Bad"	Collen; Elliott; Lange	5:24
9.	"I Wanna Touch U"	Rick Allen; Clark; Collen; Elliott; Lange	3:37
10.	"Tear It Down"	Clark; Collen; Elliott; Savage	3:38
11.	"Miss You in a Heartbeat" (Japanese bonus track)	Collen	5:06
12.	"She's Too Tough" (Japanese bonus track)	Elliott	3:39
Total length:			54:16

=== Deluxe edition (Bonus CD) ===
In the Clubs... In Your Face – Bonn, Germany 29/05/92
No.	Title	Writer(s)	Length
1.	"Hysteria" (live)	Clark; Collen; Elliott; Lange; Savage	7:17
2.	"Photograph" (live)	Clark; Elliott; Lange; Savage; Pete Willis	4:44
3.	"Pour Some Sugar on Me" (live)	Clark; Collen; Elliott; Lange; Savage	5:09
4.	"Let's Get Rocked" (live)	Collen; Elliott; Lange; Savage	5:46

Adrenalize B-sides
No.	Title	Writer(s)	Length
5.	"You Can't Always Get What You Want" (The Rolling Stones cover; with Hothouse Flowers)	Jagger–Richards	7:43
6.	"Little Wing" (The Jimi Hendrix Experience cover; with Hothouse Flowers)	Jimi Hendrix	3:40
7.	"Tonight" (version 2 – demo version featuring Steve Clark)	Clark; Collen; Elliott; Lange; Savage	4:24
8.	"Now I'm Here" (Queen cover; live – featuring Brian May)	Brian May	6:03
9.	"Two Steps Behind" (acoustic version)	Elliott	4:11
10.	"Tonight" (acoustic version, live at Sun Studio, Memphis, Tennessee, February 1993)	Clark; Collen; Elliott; Lange; Savage	4:16
11.	"Too Late for Love" (live in Denver, Colorado, February 1988)	Clark; Elliott; Lange; Savage; Willis	6:02
12.	"Women" (live in Denver, Colorado, February 1988)	Clark; Collen; Elliott; Lange; Savage	6:34

- Tracks 1–4 are taken from the band's In the Clubs... In Your Face EP, recorded at Bonn, Germany, on 29 May 1992
- Tracks 5 & 6 taken from "Have You Ever Needed Someone So Bad" single.
- Tracks 7 & 8 taken from "Tonight" single.
- Track 9 taken from "Make Love Like a Man" UK single and "Two Steps Behind" US single.
- Track 10 taken from "Two Steps Behind" single.
- Tracks 11 & 12 taken from "Let's Get Rocked" single.

== Personnel ==
- Joe Elliott – lead vocals, backing vocals
- Phil Collen – lead and rhythm guitars (except acoustic guitar on "Tonight"), backing vocals, Middle 8 lead vocals on "Make Love Like a Man"
- Rick Savage – bass guitar, synth bass pedals, backing vocals, acoustic guitar on "Tonight"
- Rick Allen – drums, backing vocals
- Steve Clark – guitar (outro on "Tear It Down, uncredited)

=== Additional personnel ===
- The Sideways Mob – backing vocals
- Robert John "Mutt" Lange, John Sykes – backing vocals
- Phil "Crash" Nicholas – keyboards on "Stand Up (Kick Love into Motion)"
- Pete Woodroffe – additional guitar on "Let's Get Rocked"

=== Production ===
- Mike "Bat Ears" Shipley – producer, engineer, mixing
- Def Leppard – producer
- Pete Woodroffe – engineer, programming, sequencing
- Robert John "Mutt" Lange – executive producer
- Robert Scovill – assistant engineer
- Bob Ludwig – mastering
- Andie Airfix – art direction
- Pamela Springsteen – photography

== Charts ==
=== Weekly charts ===
Chart (1992–1993)	Peak position
Australian Albums (ARIA)	1
Austrian Albums (Ö3 Austria)	11
Canada Top Albums/CDs (RPM)	1
Danish Albums (IFPI)	2
Dutch Albums (Album Top 100)	27
European Albums (European Top 100 Albums)	5
Finnish Albums (The Official Finnish Charts)	1
French Albums (SNEP)	18
German Albums (Offizielle Top 100)	8
Greek Albums (IFPI Greece)	8
Hungarian Albums (MAHASZ)	17
Icelandic Albums (Tónlist)	7
Irish Albums (IRMA)	1
Italian Albums (Musica e Dischi)	13
Japanese Albums (Oricon)	4
New Zealand Albums (RMNZ)	1
Norwegian Albums (Music & Media)	1
Norwegian Albums (VG-lista)	2
Portuguese Albums (AFP)	5
Swedish Albums (Sverigetopplistan)	5
Swiss Albums (Schweizer Hitparade)	1
UK Albums (Official Charts)	1
US Billboard 200	1
Zimbabwe Albums (ZIMA)	1

=== Year-end charts ===
Chart (1992)	Position
Australian Albums (ARIA)	24
German Albums (Offizielle Top 100)	31
New Zealand Albums (RMNZ)	28
Swiss Albums (Schweizer Hitparade)	7
US Billboard 200	15

== Certifications ==
Region	Certification	Certified units/sales
Australia (ARIA)	2× Platinum	140,000^{^}
Canada (Music Canada)	4× Platinum	400,000^{^}
Denmark (IFPI Danmark)	Gold	50,000^{^}
Finland (Musiikkituottajat)	Gold	25,000
France (SNEP)	Gold	100,000^{*}
India	Silver	15,000
Indonesia	Gold	25,000
Ireland (IRMA)	Gold	7,500^{^}
Japan (RIAJ)	Gold	100,000^{^}
Malaysia	Gold	15,000
Mexico (AMPROFON)	Gold	100,000^{^}
New Zealand (RMNZ)	Platinum	15,000^{^}
Norway (IFPI Norway)	Gold	25,000^{*}
Portugal (AFP)	Silver	10,000^{^}
South Africa (RISA)	Gold	25,000^{*}
Spain (Promusicae)	Gold	50,000^{^}
Sweden (GLF)	Platinum	100,000^{^}
Switzerland (IFPI Switzerland)	Platinum	50,000^{^}
United Kingdom (BPI)	Platinum	300,000^{^}
United States (RIAA)	3× Platinum	3,000,000^{^}
^{*} Sales figures based on certification alone.^{^} Shipments figures based on certification alone.
