= Let's Get Rocked =

1992 single by Def Leppard

Single by Def Leppard

from the album Adrenalize
- B-side: "Only After Dark"; "Too Late for Love" (live); "Women" (live)
- Released: 16 March 1992
- Genre: Hard rock; glam metal
- Length: 4:56
- Label: Bludgeon Riffola
- Songwriters: Joe Elliott; Phil Collen; Rick Savage; Robert John "Mutt" Lange
- Producers: Mike Shipley; Def Leppard

Def Leppard singles chronology
"Rocket" (1989)	"Let's Get Rocked" (1992)	"Make Love Like a Man" (1992)

Music video
- "Let's Get Rocked" on YouTube

"Let's Get Rocked" is a song by English hard rock band Def Leppard from their fifth studio album, Adrenalize (1992). Released in March 1992 by label Bludgeon Riffola, the song peaked at No. 2 on the UK Singles Chart, No. 1 on the US Billboard Album Rock Tracks chart, and No. 15 on the Billboard Hot 100. It was the band's first release after the death of guitarist Steve Clark.

== Background and release ==
The lyrics are about a teenager disobeying the orders of his parents. According to a Joe Elliott statement on the Rock of Ages and Best Of compilation albums, this song was an escapism since the band was working on the "White Lightning" song and felt like doing something to lighten the atmosphere. Thus, this song wound up being the last song written for the album, inspired by The Simpsons character Bart Simpson. According to Elliott, the song was written in 2 and a half days and recorded in 10 days.

== Music video ==
The song was accompanied by a then state-of-the-art computer-animated music video directed by Steve Barron. The video consists of the band playing in a computer generated stadium on top of an LED lit stage in the shape of the flag of the United Kingdom, along with CGI animated scenes featuring a character named Flynn. Flynn is seen in various moments of a typical day of a teenager's life, which include being berated by his father to do chores, or sexual activity from his girlfriend.

This video is not only the band's first without Steve Clark, who died the previous year, but their only video as a four-piece. Guitarist Vivian Campbell had not yet been selected to replace Clark. As such, initial live performances of the song were as a four-piece before Campbell joined the band.

== Track listings ==
12-inch maxi (Bludgeon Riffola) / DEFXP 7 – UK / INT 866 587-1 / picture disc

This 12-inch single picture disc has a blue eye graphic in the cover. On the back side of the picture disc has the band's picture. The back cardboard has the 12-inch single information and the same band picture. Pictures by Pamela Springsteen. Artwork and Design by Andie Airfix at Satori.

The B-side "Only After Dark" is a cover of Mick Ronson's song.

1. "Let's Get Rocked"
2. "Only After Dark" (Mick Ronson, Scott Richardson)
3. "Too Late for Love" (live)

Track 3 was recorded at McNichols Arena, Denver, Colorado on 12 & 13 February 1988

CD maxi (Bludgeon Riffola) / DEFCD 7 – UK / 866-591-2 – INT

1. "Let's Get Rocked"
2. "Only After Dark" (Mick Ronson, Scott Richardson)
3. "Women" (live)

Track 3 was recorded at McNichols Arena, Denver, Colorado on 12 & 13 February 1988

7-inch single: Bludgeon Riffola / DEF 7 (UK)

1. "Let's Get Rocked" – 4:56
2. "Only After Dark" – 4:02 (Mick Ronson, Scott Richardson)

Cassette single: Bludgeon Riffola / 866 586-4 / DEFMC 7 (UK)

1. "Let's Get Rocked"
2. "Only After Dark" (Mick Ronson, Scott Richardson)

== Charts ==
=== Weekly charts ===
Chart (1992–1993)	Peak position
Australia (ARIA)	6
Austria (Ö3 Austria Top 40)	19
Belgium (Ultratop 50 Flanders)	30
Canada Top Singles (RPM)	3
Denmark (IFPI)	6
Europe (Eurochart Hot 100)	9
Europe (European Hit Radio)	9
Finland (Suomen virallinen lista)	4
France (SNEP)	23
France Airplay (Music & Media)	20
Germany (GfK)	22
Ireland (IRMA)	4
Israel (Israeli Singles Chart)	3
Japan (Osakan Hot 100)	1
Netherlands (Dutch Top 40)	18
Netherlands (Single Top 100)	19
New Zealand (Recorded Music NZ)	7
Norway (VG-lista)	2
Portugal (AFP)	5
Spain Airplay (Music & Media)	3
Sweden (Sverigetopplistan)	18
Switzerland (Schweizer Hitparade)	3
UK Singles (Official Charts)	2
UK Airplay (Music Week)	11
US Billboard Hot 100	15
US Mainstream Rock (Billboard)	1
US Cash Box Top 100	7

=== Year-end charts ===
Chart (1992)	Position
Australia (ARIA)	72
Canada Top Singles (RPM)	46
Europe (Eurochart Hot 100)	36
Japan (Osakan Hot 100)	22
Sweden (Topplistan)	91
Switzerland (Schweizer Hitparade)	20
UK Singles (OCC)	82
UK Airplay (Music Week)	66
US Billboard Hot 100	98
US Album Rock Tracks (Billboard)	34

== Certifications ==
Region	Certification	Certified units/sales
Australia (ARIA)	Gold	35,000^{^}
^{^} Shipments figures based on certification alone.

== Release history ==
Region	Date	Format(s)	Label(s)	Ref.
United Kingdom	16 March 1992	—N/a	Bludgeon Riffola	
Australia	23 March 1992	CD; cassette	Bludgeon Riffola	
Japan	25 April 1992	CD	Mercury; Bludgeon Riffola	
