= Have You Ever Needed Someone So Bad =

Single by Def Leppard

from the album Adrenalize
- B-side: "From the Inside"; "You Can't Always Get What You Want"; "Little Wing"
- Released: August 1992
- Length: 5:20
- Label: Bludgeon Riffola
- Songwriters: Joe Elliott; Phil Collen; Robert John "Mutt" Lange
- Producers: Mike Shipley; Def Leppard

Def Leppard singles chronology
"Make Love Like a Man" (1992)	"Have You Ever Needed Someone So Bad" (1992)	"Stand Up (Kick Love into Motion)" (1992)

"Have You Ever Needed Someone So Bad" is a song by English hard rock band Def Leppard from their fifth studio album, Adrenalize (1992). In the United States, the song reached number seven on the Billboard Album Rock Tracks charts and number 12 on the Billboard Hot 100, making it the most successful single from the album in the US. The Acoustic Hippies from Hell, credited on the B-side tracks, was the name used by Def Leppard and the Hothouse Flowers performing together. The song was performed extensively during the Adrenalize and Slang tours but rarely after, most recently being done acoustically during the band's 2019 Vegas residency, and the 2022 Stadium Tour.

== Track listings ==
- CD: Bludgeon Riffola / LEPCD 8 (UK) / 864 151-2 (INT)
1. "Have You Ever Needed Someone So Bad"
2. "From the Inside" (The Acoustic Hippies from Hell)
3. "You Can't Always Get What You Want" (Rolling Stones cover) (The Acoustic Hippies from Hell)
4. "Little Wing" (Jimi Hendrix cover) (The Acoustic Hippies from Hell)
- 12-inch: Bludgeon Riffola / LEPXP 8 (UK) / INT 864 149-1 / picture disc

This 12-inch single picture disc has a stretched Adrenalize graphic in the cover. On the back side of the picture disc has the picture of Vivian Campbell. The back cardboard has the 12-inch single information and a band picture. Pictures by Ross Halfin. Artwork and Design by Andie Airfix at Satori.

1. "Have You Ever Needed Someone So Bad"
2. "From the Inside" (The Acoustic Hippies from Hell)
3. "You Can't Always Get What You Want" (The Acoustic Hippies from Hell)

== Charts ==
=== Weekly charts ===
Chart (1992)	Peak position
Australia (ARIA)	44
Canada Top Singles (RPM)	7
Ireland (IRMA)	24
New Zealand (Recorded Music NZ)	49
UK Singles (Official Charts)	16
UK Airplay (Music Week)	25
US Billboard Hot 100	12
US Mainstream Rock Airplay (Billboard)	7
US Pop Airplay (Billboard)	7
US Cash Box Top 100	11

=== Year-end charts ===
Chart (1992)	Position
Canada Top Singles (RPM)	68
US Billboard Hot 100	80

== Release history ==
Region	Date	Format(s)	Label(s)	Ref.
United States	August 1992	—N/a	Mercury	
United Kingdom	31 August 1992	7-inch vinyl; cassette	Bludgeon Riffola	
United Kingdom	7 September 1992	12-inch vinyl	Bludgeon Riffola	
Australia	7 September 1992	CD; cassette	Bludgeon Riffola	
United Kingdom	14 September 1992	CD	Bludgeon Riffola	
Japan	6 November 1992	Mini-CD	Mercury; Bludgeon Riffola	
Japan	11 November 1992	CD	Mercury; Bludgeon Riffola	
