= Long, Long Way to Go =

2003 single by Def Leppard

Single by Def Leppard

from the album X
- Released: 14 April 2003
- Genre: Pop rock
- Length: 4:38
- Label: Bludgeon Riffola; Mercury
- Songwriters: Wayne Hector; Steve Robson
- Producers: Pete Woodroffe; Def Leppard

Def Leppard singles chronology
"Four Letter Word" (2002)	"Long, Long Way to Go" (2003)	"No Matter What" (2005)

Music video
- "Long, Long Way to Go" on YouTube

"Long, Long Way to Go" is a song by English hard rock band Def Leppard, from their studio album X (2002). Written by Wayne Hector and Steve Robson, the song was later included on the Best of Def Leppard compilation album in 2004. Released as a single, it remains Def Leppard's last UK Top 40 hit single, reaching number 40 in April 2003.

== Track listing ==
CD

1. "Long, Long Way to Go"
2. "10 X Bigger Than Love"
3. "Now" (acoustic)
4. "Long, Long Way to Go" (video)

DVD

1. "Long, Long Way to Go" (video—contains "mouse" scene)
2. "Gimme a Job" (audio)
3. "Now" (30 second video clip)
4. "Pour Some Sugar on Me" (30 second video clip)
5. "Animal" (30 second video clip)
6. "Hysteria" (30 second video clip)

== Charts ==
Chart (2003)	Peak position
UK Singles (OCC)	40

== Lionel Richie version ==
"Long Long Way to Go"

Single by Lionel Richie

from the album Just for You
- Released: 2004
- Length: 4:21
- Label: Island
- Songwriters: Wayne Hector; Steve Robson
- Producers: Ric Wake; Richie Jones (add.)

Lionel Richie singles chronology
"Just for You" (2004)	"Long Long Way to Go" (2004)	"I Still Believe" (2004)

Audio
- "Long Long Way To Go" on YouTube

In 2004, American singer Lionel Richie re-recorded "Long, Long Way to Go" for his seventh studio album Just for You (2004). Production on his version was helmed by Ric Wake, featuring additional production from Richie Jones. The song was released as the album's second single and reached the top 20 on the US Adult Contemporary chart.

=== Track listings ===
CD maxi single
No.	Title	Writer(s)	Producer(s)	Length
1.	"Long Long Way to Go" (Radio edit)	Wayne Hector; Steve Robson	Ric Wake; Richie Jones^{[a]}	4:20
2.	"I Still Believe"	Richie; Paul Barry; Mark Taylor	Taylor	4:53
3.	"Still"	Richie; Barry; Taylor	Taylor	3:14
4.	"Medley"			4:41

Notes

- ^{^[a]} signifies an additional producer

=== Personnel ===
Credits lifted from the album's liner notes.

- Wayne Hector – writer
- Richie Jones – additional producer
- Lionel Richie – vocals
- Steve Robson – writer
- Ric Wake – producer

=== Charts ===
Chart (2004–2005)	Peak position
Netherlands (Single Top 100)	93
Germany (GfK)	54
US Adult Contemporary (Billboard)	20
