= Roadhouse (band) =

British rock band

- Origin: Sheffield, England
- Years active: 1990–1991
- Past members: Paul Jackson; Pete Willis; Richard Day; Wayne Grant; Frank Noon; Trevor Brewis

Roadhouse were a British rock band that were signed to Mercury Records, and included former Def Leppard members Pete Willis and Frank Noon. According to the band's website, the band recorded a four song demo with Noon as their drummer. However, Noon was no longer in Roadhouse by the time of the recording of their debut album. Roadhouse released their self-titled album in August 1991. The album is often referred to as On a Desert Road, a reference to a line in the song "Time". Several singles and videos were released from the album, with the album charting at No. 26 and two of the singles in the top ten, there are also B-sides that are not on the album. The band toured in support of Ian Gillan/No Sweat/Saxon/Two Tribes and recorded four videos for MTV. The single "Hell Can Wait" reached number 9 in the UK Rock Chart, and the single "Tower of Love" was used in the film Harley Davidson and the Marlboro Man.

Paul Jackson joined Slade for a short period as vocalist, and then went on to form a country rock outfit called Smith&Jackson. The band spent almost 10 years touring the United States with bands including Lynyrd Skynyrd, Diamond Rio, 38 Special, and were managed by the former Kiss producer Sean Delaney. Jackson has written and recorded with Kostas in Nashville and Montana, and has had three number one self penned singles in the British and international country charts since 2022.

== Band members ==
- Paul Jackson - lead vocals, acoustic guitar, harmonica
- Pete Willis - guitars, backing vocals
- Richard Day - guitars, backing vocals
- Wayne Grant - bass, backing vocals
- Frank Noon - drums (1990)
- Trevor Brewis - drums (1990–1991)
- Brian Hall - guitars, backing vocals (1991) (live substitute)
