= Dumb Blondes =

English glam rock band

The Dumb Blondes band
- Origin: England
- Genres: Glam rock, hard rock
- Years active: 1977-1983
- Past members: Jeff Hepting; Pete Webb; Phil Collen; Fred Ball; Paul Mason; Andy Tompsett; Graham Garrett

The Dumb Blondes were an English glam rock band.

The band went through two line-ups, both featuring singer Jeff Hepting and bassist Pete Webb. The first line-up also featured current Def Leppard and Man Raze guitarist Phil Collen and drummer Fred Ball. The second line-up featured guitarist Paul Mason, keyboardist Andy Tompsett, and drummer Graham Garrett.

== Previous experience of members ==
Hepting, Collen, and Ball had previously played together in the band Tush. Collen and Webb were previously in a band called Lucy, which had two singles released on Lightning Records titled "Really Got Me Goin" and "Never Never".

== Recordings ==
The Dumb Blondes had interest from EMI and were given free recording time at De Lane Lea Music Studios in Wembley by Ronnie Beck of Feldman/Trident Music who were also the publishers of Queen. They recorded six songs at this session: "The Hooker", "Necrophiliac", "Blue Smoke/Two Stroke", "Old Time Movie Star", "Spider's Web", and "Money Grabber".

== Collen and Ball leave ==
After the band broke up, Collen joined the band Girl before joining the band Def Leppard in 1983. In recent years he has also formed his own band Man Raze with ex-Sex Pistols drummer Paul Cook and former bandmate from Girl Simon Laffy on bass.

Fred Ball went on to perform in a band called XFX and is currently in a band called Slam.

Pete Webb and Jeff Hepting continued the Dumb Blondes (mk II) with new members Paul Mason (guitar), Andy Tompsett (keyboards) and Graham Garrett (drums). The band became less heavy and more keyboard orientated keeping in-line with the New Romantic period.

The band released a double-A side single (1980) titled "Strange Love"/"Sorrow" (the McCoys song which was a big hit in 1966 by the Merseys) on the then Independent Fresh Records (Fresh 21) which was produced by Pete "Overend" Watts and Dale "Buffin" Griffin, formerly of Mott the Hoople. It was put on Fresh Records' compilation album Sorrow in 1981.

This line-up also recorded songs titled "The Clown", "Heartbeat" and "Affaire de Coeur".

== Breakup ==
Graham Garrett left The Dumb Blondes to record and tour Japan with Panache before forming Ya Ya with Panache bandmate and bassist Terry Stevens along with Lea Hart and Ray Callcut and then later Sam Blewitt. Jeff also joined and toured with Panache in Japan. Jeff then went on to form the outrageous glam rock party band The Sugar Plums and also toured with 1980s tribute band Spandex Belly, he currently plays with covers band ARCHIVE who are based in Waltham Forest, London

After Dumb Blondes, Pete was involved with several bands including Tarazara, The Union (not the Luke Morley Union), WellHung, Preacher, Metalworks and lastly The Sabbath, a tribute band to Black Sabbath and Ozzy Osbourne.

== Members ==
- Jeff Hepting - lead vocals (1977–1983)
- Pete Webb - bass (1977–1983)
- Phil Collen - guitar (1977–1980)
- Fred Ball - drums (1977–1980)
- Paul Mason - guitar (1980–1983)
- Andy Tompsett - keyboards (1980–1983)
- Graham Garrett - drums (1980–1982)

== Discography (incomplete) ==
- 1978 demo
- "Strange Love"/"Sorrow" (1980)
- "The Clown" (1981)
- "Heartbeat" (1981)
- "Affaire de Coeur" (1981)
