= Just for You =

Just for You may refer to:

== Film ==
- Just for You (1952 film), an American musical film directed by Elliott Nugent
- Just for You (1964 film), a film by Douglas Hickox featuring The Warriors
- Just for You (2017 film), a South Korean film directed by Park Byoung-hwan

== Music ==
=== Albums ===
- Just for You (Gladys Knight album), 1994
- Just for You (Lionel Richie album) or the title song (see below), 2004
- Just for You (The McCrarys album) or the title song, 1980
- Just for You (Neil Diamond album), 1967
- Just for You (Gene Rice album), 1991
- Just for You, or the title song, by Gwen Guthrie, 1985

=== Songs ===
- "Just for You" (Lionel Richie song), 2004
- "Just for You" (M People song), 1997
- "Just for You", by Sam Cooke, 1961
- "Just for You", by Alan Price, 1978
- "Just for You", by Aretha Franklin from The Electrifying Aretha Franklin, 1962
- "Just for You", by Bing Crosby from Selections from the Paramount Picture "Just for You", 1952
- "Just for You", by Celia Black, the B-side of "Anyone Who Had a Heart"
- "Just for You", by The Glitter Band, 1974
- "Just for You", by Julian Lennon from Everything Changes, 2011
- "Just for You", by Level 42 from Retroglide, 2006
- "Just for You", by Michelle McManus, 2007
- "Just for You", by @onefive from 1518, 2022
- "Just for You", by Peter Green from In the Skies, 1979

== Other media ==
- Just for You, a 1975 Little Critter book by Mercer Mayer
