= Songs from the Sparkle Lounge =

Studio album by Def Leppard
- Released: 25 April 2008
- Recorded: 2006–2008
- Genre: Hard rock; glam rock
- Length: 39:12
- Label: Island; Universal Music Enterprises (US); Bludgeon Riffola/Mercury (UK & Europe)
- Producer: Ronan McHugh; Def Leppard

Def Leppard chronology
Yeah! (2006)	Songs from the Sparkle Lounge (2008)	Mirror Ball – Live & More (2011)

Singles from Songs from the Sparkle Lounge
- 1. "Nine Lives" Released: 27 April 2008; 2. "C'mon C'mon" Released: 14 July 2008

Professional ratings
Aggregate scores
Source	Rating
Metacritic	47/100
Review scores
Source	Rating
AllMusic	3/5 stars
About.com	4.5/5 stars
The A.V. Club	C−
Consequence of Sound	2.5/5 stars
The Independent	2/5 stars
Mojo	3/5 stars
Now	3/5 stars
The Observer	2/5 stars
Rolling Stone	2.5/5 stars
Uncut	2/10

Songs from the Sparkle Lounge is the tenth studio album by the English rock band Def Leppard. It was released on 25 April 2008 in Europe and 29 April in North America.

== History ==
In an Interview on Rockline radio, two band members, Joe Elliott and Vivian Campbell stated that the title of their latest studio album would be Songs from the Sparkle Lounge, saying that "Until someone comes up with a better name this will be the final title upon release". They also mentioned the possibility of previous Def Leppard album producer Robert John "Mutt" Lange being involved with a few songs for the album, but in the end this collaboration did not turn out to be possible due to scheduling conflicts. However, Joe Elliott has stated that the band and Lange still plan to work on a few songs together in the future.

In an interview with Billboard, Joe Elliott stated that the album title is a reference to a backstage tuning room at shows where the band would work on new material. "It was a mini (drum) kit, mini amps, a tape recorder and sparkly lights." Vivian Campbell also commented on the origin of the "Sparkle Lounge" in an article from Goldmine, mentioning that that room was rife with both brainstorming and "little Christmas lights, little fairy lights." Elliott also stated that they would not be performing any previews of the songs, as they did not want them appearing on websites such as YouTube prior to the release of the album.

Members of the band have described the tracks from the album as written in the style of Hysteria, with the production style of High 'n' Dry. The album's first single, "Nine Lives" features country singer Tim McGraw. The song charted at number 38 on the Canadian Rock charts and number 12 on the Billboard Heritage Rock charts.

Joe Elliott has stated at the band's official site that the concept of this album is that it sounds more like "early 70's AC/DC" and much like Led Zeppelin's song "Rock and Roll".

The title of one of the songs in the track list, "Give It Away," was changed to "Gotta Let It Go."

On 25 April 2008, Def Leppard's record label opened a website with teasers of every song on the album.

The band performed "Love" with Taylor Swift for their 2008 CMT Crossroads episode Taylor Swift and Def Leppard. Their performance of the song was not included in the actual episode, but is included as a bonus performance for the episode's DVD released exclusively to US Wal-Mart stores by Big Machine Records on 16 June 2009. It was the only post-1995 song of Def Leppard's catalogue that was performed for that project.

The album debuted at No. 5 on the Billboard 200, selling about 55,000 copies in its first week of release. It is the band's shortest album to date.

The British and Japanese versions of the album both contain an acoustic, piano version of "Love" as a bonus track, while the Japanese version also contains a second bonus track with the Def Leppard version of "Nine Lives". The Def Leppard version of "Nine Lives" is the song without Tim McGraw, and where Joe Elliott is always on lead vocals.

== Reception ==
Songs from the Sparkle Lounge received mixed reviews. At Metacritic, which assigns a normalised rating out of 100 to reviews from mainstream critics, the album has received a score of 47, based on eight reviews. Alun Williams of About.com gave the album 4.5 out of 5 stars and said "This album is so instant: huge hooks, big choruses and awesome production!" Stephen Thomas Erlewine of AllMusic rated the album 3 out of 5, praising its "tight, unified production" and deemed it an improvement over X, but felt that the album was "hampered a bit by having an immediate sound and elusive hooks".

== Track listing ==
No.	Title	Writer(s)	Length
1.	"Go"	Phil Collen; Joe Elliott	3:21
2.	"Nine Lives" (featuring Tim McGraw)	Collen; Elliott; Tim McGraw; Rick Savage	3:32
3.	"C'mon C'mon"	Savage	4:09
4.	"Love"	Savage	4:17
5.	"Tomorrow"	Collen	3:35
6.	"Cruise Control"	Vivian Campbell	3:03
7.	"Hallucinate"	Collen	3:17
8.	"Only the Good Die Young"	Campbell	3:34
9.	"Bad Actress"	Elliott	3:03
10.	"Come Undone"	Elliott	3:32
11.	"Gotta Let It Go"	Campbell	3:55
Total length:			39:12

UK and iTunes bonus track
No.	Title	Writer(s)	Length
12.	"Love" (piano version)	Savage	4:22

Japanese bonus tracks
No.	Title	Writer(s)	Length
12.	"Love" (piano version)	Savage	4:22
13.	"Nine Lives" (Def Leppard version)	Collen; Elliott; McGraw; Savage	3:33

=== Deluxe edition bonus DVD ===
- "Behind the Curtain"
- "The Sparkle Lounge Commentary"
- "Nine Lives" music video

== Personnel ==
Def Leppard

- Rick Savage – bass guitar, backing vocals, additional guitars
- Joe Elliott – lead vocals
- Rick Allen – drums, backing vocals
- Phil Collen – guitars, backing vocals
- Vivian Campbell – guitars, backing vocals

Additional personnel

- Tim McGraw – guest vocals on "Nine Lives"

== Charts ==
Chart performance for Songs from the Sparkle Lounge
Chart (2008)	Peak position
Australian Albums (ARIA)	82
Belgian Albums (Ultratop Wallonia)	88
Canadian Albums (Billboard)	7
Finnish Albums (Suomen virallinen lista)	27
French Albums (SNEP)	118
German Albums (Offizielle Top 100)	43
Irish Albums (IRMA)	32
Italian Albums (FIMI)	58
Japanese Albums (Oricon)	25
New Zealand Albums (RMNZ)	26
Norwegian Albums (VG-lista)	15
Scottish Albums (OCC)	10
Swedish Albums (Sverigetopplistan)	26
Swiss Albums (Schweizer Hitparade)	29
UK Albums (OCC)	10
UK Rock & Metal Albums (OCC)	1
US Billboard 200	5
US Top Hard Rock Albums (Billboard)	1
US Top Rock Albums (Billboard)	1
US Indie Store Album Sales (Billboard)	15
