= Now (Def Leppard song) =

2002 single by Def Leppard

Single by Def Leppard

from the album X
- B-side: "Let Me Be the One"; Album snippets; "Stay with Me"; "Rebel Rebel"
- Released: 5 August 2002
- Length: 3:58
- Label: Bludgeon Riffola; Mercury
- Songwriters: Marti Frederiksen; Phil Collen; Joe Elliott; Vivian Campbell; Rick Savage; Rick Allen
- Producer: Marti Frederiksen

Def Leppard singles chronology
"Day After Day" (2000)	"Now" (2002)	"Four Letter Word" (2002)

Music video
- "Now" on YouTube

"Now" is a song by English hard rock band Def Leppard, released as the lead single from their eighth studio album, X (2002). It peaked at number 23 on the UK Singles Chart.

== Music video ==
The music video (directed by the Malloys) focuses on a Def Leppard Union Jack T-shirt that finds its way through different owners for nearly two decades. It starts in the year 1983, when a teenage girl purchases the shirt from a music store. One day, as she is sleeping, her younger brother steals the shirt and rides off with his friend to sneak into a neighbour's backyard and use the swimming pool. They quickly run away when the homeowner spots them, leaving the shirt behind.

In 1985, a man buys the shirt at a garage sale. At a parking lot prior to a Def Leppard concert, he surrenders it to a female fan after she flashes him. When the band's tour bus arrives, the female fan has bassist Rick Savage autograph the shirt. Shortly after the concert, she meets a roadie and makes out with him in the bus, where he takes possession of the shirt.

In 1987, the roadie enters a coin-op laundromat to have the shirt and his laundry cleaned. As he sleeps while waiting for his laundry, a woman steals the shirt and slips it between her laundry in a cart.

The video ends in the year 2002, where a woman (presumably an older version of the teenager from the 1983 scene), buys the shirt from an online auction and then receives it in the mail.

== Track listings ==
UK CD1 (indigo)

1. "Now"
2. "Let Me Be the One"
3. Album snippets
4. "Now" (video)

UK CD2 (green)

1. "Now"
2. "Stay with Me"
3. "Rebel Rebel"

UK CD3 (red)

1. "Now"
2. "Pour Some Sugar on Me" (live)
3. "Let's Get Rocked" (live)

== Charts ==
Chart (2002)	Peak position
Canada (Nielsen SoundScan)	29
Germany (GfK)	72
Poland (PiF PaF)	26
Portugal (AFP)	10
Scotland Singles (Official Charts)	22
Sweden (Sverigetopplistan)	57
Switzerland (Schweizer Hitparade)	84
UK Singles (Official Charts)	23
UK Rock & Metal (Official Charts)	2
US Adult Pop Airplay (Billboard)	40
US Mainstream Rock (Billboard)	26

== Release history ==
Region	Date	Format(s)	Label(s)	Ref.
United States	15 July 2002	Contemporary hit; hot adult contemporary; mainstream rock; active rock radio	Bludgeon Riffola; Island	
United Kingdom	5 August 2002	CD	Bludgeon Riffola; Mercury	
