= No Sweat (band) =

Irish rock band

- Origin: Dublin, Ireland
- Genres: Hard rock, AOR
- Years active: 1986–1991
- Label: London
- Past members: Paul Quinn; Connor McKeon; John "Harv" Harbinson; Dave Gooding; Jim Phillips; Jon Angel; P.J. Smith; Eddie Fincher; Ray Fean; Declan Morell

No Sweat were an Irish rock band, active during the late 1980s and early 1990s. They are best remembered for their single "Heart and Soul" (produced by the Def Leppard frontman Joe Elliott), which topped the Irish Singles Chart for two weeks in June 1989.

== Singles ==
Following "Heart and Soul" reaching number one in 1989, the group had two further Irish hits in 1990 with "Tear Down the Walls" (No. 4) and "On the Edge" (No. 11). 1990 also saw the release of their self-titled debut album, which was produced by Keith Olsen for Pogo Logo Corp., and was recorded at the Goodnight L.A. studio in Van Nuys, California, United States.

"Heart and Soul" and "Tear Down the Walls" were released as singles in the United Kingdom, with both enjoying minor success in the UK Singles Chart. The former spent four weeks in that chart, peaking at No. 64, whilst "Tear Down the Walls" peaked at No. 61.

== Post break-up ==
Following No Sweat's break-up, guitarist Dave Gooding, became the vocalist for blues-rock band b.l.o.w. with former members of Little Angels. Keyboard player P.J. Smith moved to Los Angeles where he pursued a songwriting and performing career with bands such as Toe and Clock.

== Members ==
- Paul Quinn – lead vocals
- Connor McKeon – lead vocals
- John "Harv" Harbinson – lead vocals
- Dave Gooding – guitars, backing vocals
- Jim Phillips – guitars, backing vocals
- Jon Angel – bass, backing vocals
- P.J. Smith – keyboards, piano, computer, tambourine, backing vocals
- Eddie Fincher – drums
- Ray Fean – drums, percussion
- Declan Morell – drums

== Discography ==
=== Albums ===
- No Sweat (1990)

=== Singles ===
- "Heart and Soul" (1989) - IRE No. 1, UK No. 64
- "On the Edge" (1990) - IRE No. 11, UK No. 87
- "Tear Down the Walls" (1990) - IRE No. 4, UK No. 61
