= Just for You (Lionel Richie album) =

2004 album by Lionel Richie

Studio album by Lionel Richie
- Released: March 8, 2004
- Length: 53:54
- Label: Island
- Producer: 7 Aurelius; Daniel Bedingfield; Chuckii Booker; David Bradley; John Dixson; Richie Jones; Lenny Kravitz; Mark Taylor; Troy Taylor; Ric Wake

Lionel Richie chronology
20th Century Masters – The Millennium Collection: The Best of Lionel Richie (2003)	Just for You (2004)	Gold (2006)

Singles from Just for You
- 1. "Just for You" Released: March 1, 2004; 2. "Long, Long Way to Go" Released: 2004

Just for You is the seventh studio album by American singer Lionel Richie. It was released by Island Records first on March 8, 2004, in the United Kingdom. Released shortly after Richie's divorce from his second wife Diane, the album features Richie in collaboration with singers and musicians from different backgrounds, including frequent collaborators Chuckii Booker, Mark Taylor, and Ric Wake as well as contemporary R&B producer 7 Aurelius and singers Daniel Bedingfield and Lenny Kravitz, both of whom appear as guest vocalists.

Just for You received mixed reviews, with much of the criticism targeted at the album's lyrics. It entered the top five in Austria and the United Kingdom, and reached the top ten of the German and Swiss Albums Chart. In the UK, the album sold more than 100,000 copies and was certified gold by the British Phonographic Industry (BPI). In the US, it debuted at number 47 on the Billboard 200 and number 22 on the Top R&B/Hip-Hop Albums chart, eventually selling 207,000 copies. The album spawned several singles, with lead single "Just for You" reaching the top thirty on several charts.

== Background ==
Richie, previously a member of the Commodores, had become a solo artist in the early 1980s. With the release of Can't Slow Down in 1983, he became one of the biggest solo acts in the country before leaving the industry in 1987. He began working towards a comeback in the late 1990s but while he enjoyed international success, his albums failed to chart or sell noticeably in the United States. Following the release of his hit compilation album The Definitive Collection in 2003 and his daughter Nicole's appearance in The Simple Life, Richie returned to public attention. Shortly before producing Just for You Richie and his wife, Diane, were divorced.

For his seventh album Richie brought singers and musicians from different genres. Lenny Kravitz and Daniel Bedingfield sang duets with him, while songwriters Paul Barry and Mark Taylor – who were best known for light works – wrote several songs. Another guest songwriter and producer was 7 Aurelius, of Murder, Inc. In a 2004 interview with NBC, Richie stated that he had been approached to record Just for You by his manager in London. He found it easy to write, because "all I had to do was play myself." In another interview, Richie said that – as opposed to "Three Times a Lady", which he had dedicated to his ex-wife Brenda – Just for You was dedicated to himself, an "introverted perspective" on what had excited him.

== Critical reception ==
Professional ratings
Review scores
Source	Rating
AllMusic	3/5 stars
BBC Music	(average)
Entertainment Weekly	D
The Guardian	3/5 stars
musicOMH	(unfavorable)
Rolling Stone	2/5 stars
RTÉ.ie	2/5 stars
Soul Shine Magazine	4/5 stars
Vibe	3/5 stars

Just for You received mixed reviews, with Album of the Year collecting 4 reviews and calculating an average of 51 out of 100. Dominic Darrah of Soul Shine Magazine gave the album four out of five stars, praising its mix of "sweet ballads" and "new sounds". The Guardian's Dave Simpson found that Richie was "disturbingly in tune with the times," mixing "boy band anthems" with funk, rock, and soul. Stephen Thomas Erlewine, writing for AllMusic, gave Just for You three out of five stars, considering the album "well-crafted" and consistent in sound quality and cohesive. He found, however, that the album was weaker than Richie's work in the 1980s. Marcus Reeves of Vibe likewise gave the album three stars, finding that several tracks – such as "She's Amazing" – to be reflective of Richie's earlier work, although he dismissed the "cheesy, clichéd lyrics" of the "we-are-the-world social anthems" included. He concluded that, although the album was well made, it would please only Richie's existing fans.

Jack Smith of BBC Music found Just for You "far better than many would ofdreamed [sic] possible", highlighting the album's two duets as among its best and describing "Just to Be with You Again" as "sensitively produced and performed to absolute perfection". Clare Colley of musicOMH described the album as a "back to basics record", with "Do Ya" and "If You Belong to Me" as its best tracks. Ultimately she was disappointed with the release; she criticized the lyrics as generally "mawkish", with the album overall "chronically underdeveloped and bland". Christian Hoard and Jon Caramanica of Rolling Stone gave the album two stars out of five, writing that Richie had not "stray[ed] too far from his strengths" in producing the work. Kristina Feliciano of Entertainment Weekly was highly critical of the album, writing that its lyrics were "flaccid", with the sound unproportional. Katie Moten of RTÉ.ie found the album "disappointing", lacking originality; she considered "Do Ya" the only good song.

== Chart performance ==
Just for You was released on March 8 2004 in the United Kingdom and May 4 of that same year in the United States. In the US, the album debuted at number 47 on the Billboard 200 and number 22 on the publication's Top R&B/Hip-Hop Albums chart, becoming Richie's highest-charting album since Louder Than Words (1996). Elsewhere, Just for You entered the top five in Austria and the United Kingdom, and reached the top ten in Germany and Switzerland. In the UK, it surpassed the mark of 100,000 sold copies within its first two weeks of release and was certfied gold by the British Phonographic Industry (BPI).

Three singles from the album, "Just for You", "Just for You (The Dance Remixes)", and "Long, Long Way to Go", charted. "Just for You" performed best of these, peaking at number 6 on the US Adult Contemporary chart. As of May 2012, the album has sold 207,000 copies in the United States, according to Nielsen SoundScan. Richie's subsequent releases have shown a consistent increase in sales, beginning with 2006's Coming Home.

== Track listing ==
No.	Title	Writer(s)	Producer(s)	Length
1.	"Just for You"	Lionel Richie; Paul Barry; Mark Taylor	Taylor	4:33
2.	"I Still Believe"	Richie; Barry; Taylor	Taylor	4:55
3.	"Long Long Way to Go"	Wayne Hector; Steve Robson	Ric Wake; Richie Jones^{[a]}	4:21
4.	"Just to Be with You Again"	Richie; Barry; Taylor	Taylor	3:32
5.	"She's Amazing"	Richie; 7 Aurelius; Chuckii Booker; Paul Bushnell; Bashiri Johnson	Se7en Smash Productions	4:36
6.	"Heaven"	Richie; John Dixson; David Bradley	Richie; Dixson^{[b]}; Bradley^{[b]}	4:01
7.	"The World Is a Party"	Richie; 7 Aurelius; Trevor Lawrence, Jr.; Charles Fearing	Se7en Smash Productions	3:25
8.	"Time of Our Life" (featuring Lenny Kravitz)	Richie; Kravitz	Kravitz	5:07
9.	"Outrageous"	Richie; Barry; Taylor	Taylor	4:30
10.	"Road to Heaven"	Richie; 7 Aurelius	Kravitz	4:20
11.	"Dance for the World"	Richie; 7 Aurelius	Se7en Smash Productions	4:01
12.	"Do Ya" (duet with Daniel Bedingfield)	Richie; Bedingfield	Bedingfield^{[c]}; Booker^{[c]}; Troy Taylor^{[a]}	2:39
13.	"In My Dreams"	Richie; 7 Aurelius; Miredys Peguero; Booker; Lawrence, Jr.	Se7en Smash Productions	4:56
14.	"One World"	Richie; Barry; Taylor	Taylor	3:52
Total length:				58:48

2021 Deluxe Version
No.	Title	Length
1.	"Just for You"	4:33
2.	"I Still Believe" (Album Version)	4:53
3.	"Long Long Way to Go" (Album Version)	4:21
4.	"Just to Be with You Again" (Album Version)	3:29
5.	"Heaven" (Album Version)	4:01
6.	"She's Amazing" (Album Version)	4:35
7.	"Ball and Chain" (Album Version)	3:15
8.	"Time of Our Life" (Album Version featuring Lenny Kravitz)	5:07
9.	"Outrageous" (Album Version)	4:29
10.	"Road to Heaven" (Album Version)	4:20
11.	"Do Ya" (Domestic Version featuring Daniel Bedingfield)	2:39
12.	"In My Dreams" (Album Version)	4:56
13.	"One World" (Album Version)	3:52
14.	"Dance for the World" (Album Version)	4:06
15.	"If You Belong to Me" (Album Version)	4:22
16.	"The World Is a Party" (Album Version)	3:23
17.	"Just for You" (Pound Boys Club Mix)	8:15
18.	"Just for You" (Pound Boys Radio Mix)	3:36
19.	"Just for You" (Metro Remix)	5:59
20.	"Just for You" (Pound Boys Dub)	7:35
21.	"Just for You" (Pound Boys Mixshow)	4:34
22.	"Just for You" (The Elektrik Kompany Mixshow)	6:24
23.	"Just for You" (The Elektrik Kompany Radio Edit)	3:31
24.	"Just for You" (The Elektrik Kompany Rhythm Radio Mix)	3:31
25.	"Just for You" (Todd Terry Pop Radio Mix)	4:07
26.	"Just for You" (Todd Terry Dub)	6:23
27.	"All Night Long" (Live)	5:01
Total length:		125:30

Notes

- ^{^[a]} signifies an additional producer
- ^{^[b]} signifies a co-producer
- ^{^[c]} signifies an original producer

== Charts ==
=== Weekly charts ===
Chart (2004)	Peak position
Australian Albums (ARIA)	44
Austrian Albums (Ö3 Austria)	5
Belgian Albums (Ultratop Flanders)	47
Belgian Albums (Ultratop Wallonia)	55
Canadian Albums (Nielsen SoundScan)	22
Canadian R&B Albums (Nielsen SoundScan)	5
Dutch Albums (Album Top 100)	21
French Albums (SNEP)	26
German Albums (Offizielle Top 100)	10
Irish Albums (IRMA)	55
Italian Albums (FIMI)	34
Scottish Albums (OCC)	12
Swiss Albums (Schweizer Hitparade)	8
UK Albums (OCC)	5
US Billboard 200	47
US Top R&B/Hip-Hop Albums (Billboard)	22

=== Year-end charts ===
Chart (2004)	Position
German Albums (Offizielle Top 100)	37
Swiss Albums (Schweizer Hitparade)	81
UK Albums (OCC)	122

== Certifications and sales ==
Region	Certification	Certified units/sales
Germany (BVMI)	Gold	100,000^{‡}
United Kingdom (BPI)	Gold	100,000^{^}
^{^} Shipments figures based on certification alone.^{‡} Sales+streaming figures based on certification alone.

== Works cited ==
- Colley, Clare (March 18, 2004). "Lionel Richie - Just For You (Mercury)". musicOMH. Archived from the original on March 16, 2009.
- Darrah, Dominic (June 2004). "Lionel Richie; Album Title: Just For You". Soul Shine Magazine. Archived from the original on March 4, 2016.
- Erlewine, Stephen Thomas. "Just for You". AllMusic. Archived from the original on July 22, 2012.
- Caulfield, Keith (May 24, 2012). "Lionel Richie's 'Tuskegee' Becomes Year's Second-Biggest Album: Singer's Country Set Has Outsold His Last Three Combined". Billboard. Archived from the original on May 28, 2013.
- Feliciano, Kristina (May 7, 2004). "Reviews of Just for You and Patti LaBelle's Timeless Journey". Entertainment Weekly. p. 84. Archived from the original on April 26, 2009.
- Hoard, Christian; Caramanica, Jon (May 13, 2004). "Lionel Richie: Just for You". Rolling Stone. Archived from the original on January 17, 2008.
- Huey, Steve. "Lionel Richie". AllMusic. Archived from the original on February 10, 2013.
- "Just for You | Awards". AllMusic. Archived from the original on June 18, 2022.
- Kelly, Jane (March 8, 2004). "Lionel Richie – My Wife's Demands are Crazy". Evening Standard. Archived from the original on June 12, 2022.
- Moten, Katie (April 1, 2004). "Lionel Richie - Just For You". RTÉ.ie. Archived from the original on December 20, 2011.
- Norville, Deborah (May 10, 2004). "Lionel Richie reflects on his career, life, and new album". NBC News. Archived from the original on March 4, 2016.
- Reeves, Marcus (May 2004). "Lionel Richie: Just for You". Vibe: 162.
- Simpson, Dave (March 12, 2004). "Lionel Richie, Just for You". The Guardian. Archived from the original on March 29, 2009.
- Smith, Jack (March 18, 2004). "Lionel Richie Just For You Review". BBC Music. Archived from the original on February 11, 2011.
