= Pete Willis =

English guitarist (born 1960)

- Born: Peter Andrew Willis; 16 February 1960 (age 66); Sheffield, England
- Genres: Heavy metal; hard rock
- Occupation: Guitarist
- Years active: 1977–1991
- Formerly of: Def Leppard; Gogmagog; Roadhouse
- Spouse: Lindsay Smith (m. 1985)

Peter Andrew Willis (born 16 February 1960) is a retired English guitarist, best known as a founding member of the hard rock band Def Leppard. He was with Def Leppard from 1977 to 1982, when he was fired from the band and replaced by Phil Collen. His firing was due to drinking problems.

== Career ==
He co-wrote many tracks and played guitar on the band's first three albums: On Through the Night, High 'n' Dry, and Pyromania, which was being recorded at the time of his departure.

He was dismissed from the band on 11 July 1982, during the recording of Pyromania, due to excessive drinking that hampered his guitar playing, and was replaced by guitarist Phil Collen the next day. Willis later recorded with the bands Gogmagog (with former and current members of Iron Maiden) and Roadhouse. Willis played Hamer Standard guitars almost exclusively during his tenure with Def Leppard.

Willis later admitted his dismissal from Def Leppard was for the best. He said "things were going too fast for me; I was still enjoying it, but I was using drink as a crutch." He added "It wasn't nice to go that way, but it was something that needed to happen for them and the best thing to happen health-wise for me...if I'd stayed there was a good chance that I'd have ended up going the same way as Steve Clark" who died of drug and alcohol abuse complications in 1991. Of his dismissal Willis said "Joe Elliott was nice about it; he said I'm really sorry Pete, I didn't want to have to be the one to tell you this."

Willis was inducted into the Rock and Roll Hall of Fame in 2019 as a member of Def Leppard, but did not attend the induction ceremony.

== Personal life ==
Willis married Lindsay Smith in 1985, and had two sons: Luke and Andrew. The family resides in Crookes, Sheffield. Willis left the music business. He now runs his own property management company in Sheffield.

== Discography ==
=== with Def Leppard ===
- The Def Leppard E.P. (1979) (aka Getcha Rocks Off EP)
- On Through the Night (1980)
- High 'n' Dry (1981)
- Pyromania (1983)

=== with Gogmagog ===
- I Will Be There EP (1985)

=== with Roadhouse ===
- Roadhouse (1991)
