= X (Def Leppard album) =

- US cover

Studio album by Def Leppard
- Released: 30 July 2002
- Recorded: 2001–2002
- Studios: Joe's Garage; (Dublin, Ireland); Polar Studios; (Stockholm, Sweden); Rumbo Recorders; (Los Angeles, California)
- Genre: Pop rock
- Length: 47:09
- Labels: Island (US); Bludgeon Riffola/Mercury (UK & Europe)
- Producers: Pete Woodroffe; Def Leppard; Per Aldeheim; Andreas Carlsson; Marti Frederiksen

Def Leppard chronology
Euphoria (1999)	X (2002)	Best Of (2004)

Singles from X
- 1. "Now" Released: 5 August 2002; 2. "Four Letter Word" Released: 23 November 2002; 3. "Long, Long Way to Go" Released: 14 April 2003

Professional ratings
Aggregate scores
Source	Rating
Metacritic	60/100
Review scores
Source	Rating
AllMusic	2.5/5 stars
Blender	2/5 stars
Q	3/5 stars
Rolling Stone	3/5 stars

X is the eighth studio album by English rock band Def Leppard, released on 30 July 2002 by Island Records in the US and sister label Mercury worldwide. Much like 1996's Slang, it featured a departure from their signature sound by moving into the pop genre. The album charted at No. 11 on The Billboard 200 and No. 14 on the UK Albums Chart. Most of the album was produced by Pete Woodroffe and the band, with remaining tracks produced by either Marti Frederiksen or Per Aldeheim and Andreas Carlsson.

== Background ==
This is the first Def Leppard album in which drummer Rick Allen is heavily credited with song-writing. The album is also the first from the band to include original songs not to be written by any of the members: "Unbelievable" and "Long, Long Way to Go", the latter of which was released as a single.

The album features the Roman numeral 'X', recognising it as their tenth album release, although the album is in fact only their eighth collection of all-new studio material. (The other two albums, Retro Active and Vault, were a collection of B-sides and rarities, and a greatest hits set respectively, although Vault also included a non-album single "When Love & Hate Collide" as well as the single mixes of the songs "Pour Some Sugar on Me" and "Rocket".)

The album X peaked at number 11 on the Billboard 200, selling nearly 72,000 in its first week, but did not sell to the standards of their previous releases and failed to earn any RIAA certifications. With the exception of an abbreviated version of "Now" being performed as part of an acoustic medley during the Rock of Ages Tour in 2012, nothing from this album was performed live by the band since the conclusion of its supporting tour until their Las Vegas residency in 2019.

For a short time after the album was released, Def Leppard's website Defleppard.com featured a free mp3 download of "Perfect Girl," an early version of the track "Gravity".

The album was released on vinyl for the first time in 2019 alongside 3 other albums from the 2000s, Yeah! and Songs from the Sparkle Lounge, before being released standalone later the same year.

== Reception ==
X received mixed reviews. Stephen Thomas Erlewine of AllMusic rated the album 2.5 out of 5. While commending the band for not adopting the then-popular nu metal and rap rock sound of the time, Erlewine lamented that the band's pop rock approach meant that "they've left rock behind, turning out a bunch of even-handed adult-pop that is melodic without being tuneful, or memorable for that matter." He concludes that, in some instances on X, "Leppard still shows signs of being a great band -- there's a chorus or a bridge here and there with spark, "You're So Beautiful" and "Everyday" are the kind of sugar-sweet, heavy-pop songs that make this band so irresistible—but the slick production and self-conscious maturity make X a leaden affair, unfortunately."

Conversely, Rob Sheffield of Rolling Stone was more positive, favorably comparing X to Bon Jovi's Crush. Sheffield notes how "since the Lepsters always had catchier beats and craftier tunes than the metal competition, they adapt to global pop with their signature sound intact, and X may be their niftiest since Adrenalize."

== Track listing ==
All tracks are written by Rick Allen, Vivian Campbell, Phil Collen, Joe Elliott and Rick Savage except where noted.

No.	Title	Writer(s)	Length
1.	"Now"	Allen; Campbell; Collen; Elliott; Marti Frederiksen; Savage	3:58
2.	"Unbelievable"	Per Aldeheim; Andreas Carlsson; Max Martin	3:58
3.	"You're So Beautiful"	Allen; Campbell; Collen; Elliott; Frederiksen; Savage	3:31
4.	"Everyday"	Allen; Campbell; Collen; Elliott; Frederiksen; Savage	3:08
5.	"Long, Long Way to Go"	Wayne Hector; Steve Robson	4:38
6.	"Four Letter Word"		3:07
7.	"Torn to Shreds"		2:56
8.	"Love Don't Lie"		4:46
9.	"Gravity"	Allen; Campbell; Collen; Elliott; Savage; Pete Woodroffe	2:33
10.	"Cry"		3:20
11.	"Girl Like You"		2:49
12.	"Let Me Be the One"		3:29
13.	"Scar"	Allen; Campbell; Collen; Elliott; Savage; Woodroffe	4:59

UK/Japanese bonus tracks
No.	Title	Writer(s)	Length
14.	"Kiss the Day"		4:27
15.	"Long, Long Way to Go" (acoustic)	Hector; Robson	4:43

== Personnel ==
=== Def Leppard ===
- Rick Allen – drums
- Vivian Campbell – guitar, vocals
- Phil Collen – guitar, vocals
- Joe Elliott – lead vocals
- Rick "Sav" Savage – bass guitar, vocals

=== Additional personnel ===
- Eric Carter – keyboards and drum loops on "Now", "You're So Beautiful" and "Everyday"
- Stan Schiller – shredding tele licks on "Gravity"

=== Production ===
- Producers: Def Leppard, Per Aldeheim, Andreas Carlsson, Pete Woodroffe
- Engineers: Stefan Glaumann, Richard Chycki, Ronan McHugh, Liz Sroka, Pete Woodroffe
- Mixing: Marti Frederiksen, Ronan McHugh, Pete Woodroffe
- Mastering: Tom Coyne
- A&R: Simon Collins, Jeff Fenster
- Production co-ordination: Leslie Langlo, Sue Tropio
- Editing: Brian Paturalski
- Vocal producer: Ronan McHugh
- Drum technician: Jerry Johnson
- String arrangements: David Campbell
- Programming: Ronan McHugh, Pete Woodroffe
- Photography: Clive Arrowsmith

== Charts ==
=== Weekly charts ===
Chart (2002)	Peak position
Australian Albums (ARIA)	49
Finnish Albums (Suomen virallinen lista)	33
French Albums (SNEP)	75
German Albums (Offizielle Top 100)	19
Irish Albums (IRMA)	37
Japanese Albums (Oricon)	15
Norwegian Albums (VG-lista)	19
Scottish Albums (Official Charts)	16
Swedish Albums (Sverigetopplistan)	15
Swiss Albums (Schweizer Hitparade)	9
UK Albums (Official Charts)	14
UK Rock & Metal Albums (Official Charts)	3
US Billboard 200	11

=== Year-end charts ===
Year-end chart performance for X by Def Leppard
Chart (2002)	Position
Canadian Metal Albums (Nielsen SoundScan)	46
