= Clock (American band) =

Clock is a rock band featuring Def Leppard guitarist Vivian Campbell and former No Sweat member P.J. Smith, who sang backing vocals on Def Leppard's cover of the Sweet song "Action" on Def Leppard's Retro Active (1993) album.

Clock's album Through Time (1998) features the original version of "To Be Alive", which is featured on Def Leppard's Euphoria (1999) album.

Other members have included Mark Schulman, Mark Browne, and Manny Alvarez.
