= Cybernauts =

David Bowie cover band

- Origin: England
- Genre: Glam rock
- Spinoff of: The Spiders from Mars; Def Leppard
- Past members: Joe Elliott; Phil Collen; Trevor Bolder; Mick "Woody" Woodmansey; Dick Decent

The Cybernauts were a David Bowie cover band, formed as a tribute to Mick Ronson, featuring Def Leppard members Joe Elliott and Phil Collen, former Spiders from Mars members Trevor Bolder and Mick "Woody" Woodmansey, and keyboardist/vocalist, Dick Decent.

Cybernauts released a limited edition live album in Japan only, via Universal Music/Victor Entertainment Japan.

== Track listing ==
1. "Watch That Man"
2. "Hang On to Yourself"
3. "Changes"
4. "The Supermen"
5. "Five Years"
6. "Cracked Actor"
7. "Moonage Daydream"
8. "Angel No. 9"
9. "The Jean Genie"
10. "Life on Mars"
11. "The Man Who Sold the World"
12. "Starman"
13. "The Width of a Circle"
14. "Ziggy Stardust"
15. "White Light White Heat"
16. "Rock 'N' Roll Suicide"
17. "Suffragette City"
18. "All the Young Dudes"

In 2001, Cybernauts released a two-CD set consisting of the live album plus the EP The Further Adventures of the Cybernauts which contained studio recordings, via Arachnophobia Records, England.

== The Further Adventures of the Cybernauts ==
1. "Manic Depression"
2. "All the Young Dudes"
3. "Moonage Daydream"
4. "The Man Who Sold the World"
5. "Time"
6. "Panic in Detroit"
7. "Lady Grinning Soul/Moonage Daydream" (alternate version)
