= Just for You (Lionel Richie song) =

Single by Lionel Richie

from the album Just for You
- Released: March 1, 2004
- Length: 4:33
- Label: Island Def Jam
- Songwriters: Lionel Richie; Paul Barry; Mark Taylor
- Producer: Mark Taylor

Lionel Richie singles chronology
| "To Love a Woman" (2003) | "Just for You" (2004) | "Long, Long Way to Go" (2004) |

"Just for You" is a song by American singer Lionel Richie. It was written by Richie, Paul Barry, and Mark Taylor for his same-titled seventh studio album (2004), while production was helmed by the latter. The song was released as the album's lead single and peaked at number 20 on the UK Singles Chart, also reaching the top 30 in Austria, Germany, and Switzerland as well as number six on the US Adult Contemporary chart. Richie recorded the song again for his 2012 country album Tuskegee, with country singer Billy Currington.

== Track listings ==
CD maxi single
| No. | Title | Writer(s) | Producer(s) | Length |
|---|---|---|---|---|
| 1. | "Just for You" (Radio Edit) | Lionel Richie; Paul Barry; Mark Taylor | M. Taylor | 3:38 |
| 2. | "Just for You" (Metro Mix) | Richie; Barry; M. Taylor | M. Taylor; Jeff Taylor^{[a]} | 5:59 |
| 3. | "Cinderella" (Pound Boy Radio Mix) | Richie; Barry; M. Taylor | M. Taylor; Craug C^{[a]}; Dealer^{[a]} | 3:37 |
| 4. | "All Night Long" (Live) | Richie | | 5:01 |

Notes

- ^{^[a]} signifies an additional producer

== Charts ==
=== Weekly charts ===
| Chart (2004) | Peak position |
|---|---|
| Austria (Ö3 Austria Top 40) | 24 |
| Belgium (Ultratip Bubbling Under Flanders) | 3 |
| Belgium (Ultratip Bubbling Under Wallonia) | 8 |
| Germany (GfK) | 24 |
| Hungary (Rádiós Top 40) | 9 |
| Italy (FIMI) | 25 |
| Netherlands (Single Top 100) | 47 |
| Poland (Polish Airplay Chart) | 6 |
| Sweden (Sverigetopplistan) | 51 |
| Switzerland (Schweizer Hitparade) | 35 |
| UK Singles (Official Charts) | 20 |
| US Billboard Hot 100 | 92 |
| US Adult Contemporary (Billboard) | 6 |

=== Year-end charts ===
| Chart (2004) | Position |
|---|---|
| Germany (Media Control GfK) | 91 |
| Hungary (Rádiós Top 40) | 13 |
| US Adult Contemporary (Billboard) | 13 |

| Chart (2005) | Position |
|---|---|
| Hungary (Rádiós Top 40) | 37 |
