= Phil Collen =

British guitarist (born 1957)

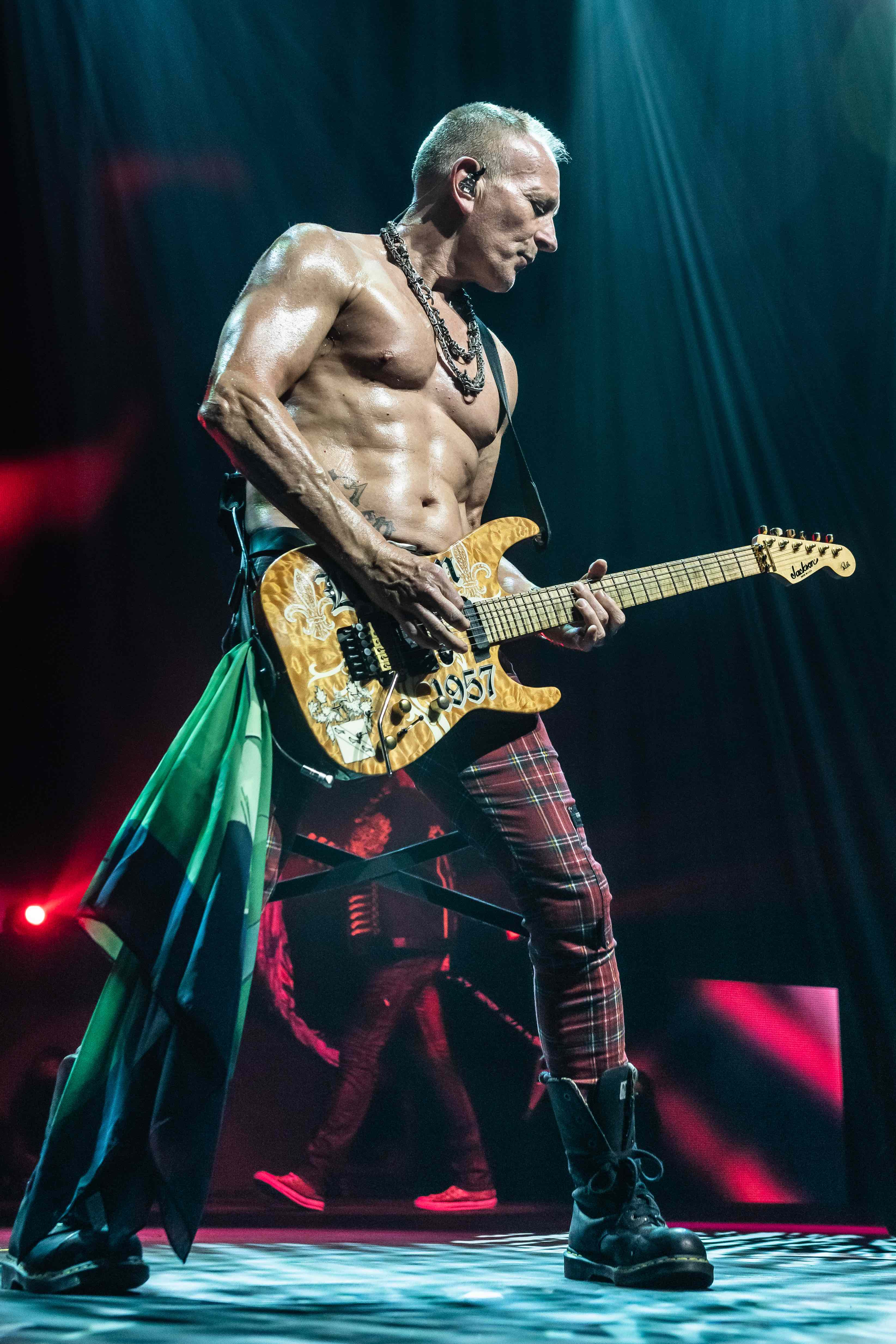

Background information
- Also known as: One-half of "The Terror Twins" with co-guitarist Steve Clark: 1983–1991
- Born: Philip Kenneth Collen; 8 December 1957 (age 68); Hackney, London, England
- Genres: Hard rock; heavy metal; glam metal; alternative rock; glam rock
- Occupation: Musician
- Instruments: Guitar; vocals
- Years active: 1974–present
- Label: Mercury
- Member of: Def Leppard; Man Raze
- Formerly of: Dumb Blondes; Girl; Cybernauts
- Website: defleppard.com/member/phil-collen/

Philip Kenneth Collen (born 8 December 1957) is an English musician who is best known as the co-lead guitarist for the rock band Def Leppard. Collen joined the band in 1982 during the recording of the Pyromania album. Before joining Def Leppard, Collen had performed with a number of bands in the burgeoning British glam metal scene. Outside of Def Leppard, he has been involved in a number of side projects; those projects include the trio Man Raze, with which he is the lead singer and sole guitarist.

Collen has been noted for his shred guitar playing style.

== Early life ==
Collen was born in Hackney, London. He got his first guitar, a red Gibson SG, on his 16th birthday, and taught himself how to play. He played with several bands including Lucy, Tush, and Dumb Blondes.

He left school to work as a motorcycle dispatch rider for a typesetter until his band Girl got their first record contract. During his tenure with Girl, Collen's career began rising, spurred by the relative success of the albums Sheer Greed and Wasted Youth, which allowed him the opportunity to play at more significant venues.

A young Collen can also be seen on the back cover of Deep Purple's live album Made in Japan as the live photo was actually taken at the Rainbow Theatre in London, a concert Collen attended, and not in Japan.

In an interview, Collen revealed that he was approached by Steve Harris to join Iron Maiden replacing guitarist Dennis Stratton.

== Def Leppard ==
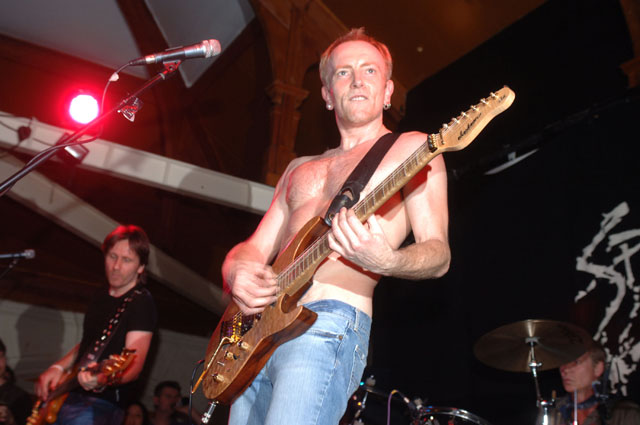
Collen in 2005

Before Collen joined Def Leppard on 12 July 1982 during the recording of Pyromania, he had previously been asked to consider joining the band during the 1981 tour for High 'n' Dry by Joe Elliott and Steve Clark, whom he knew at the time. Despite this invitation, there was no need to replace Pete Willis. As a result, Collen stayed a member of Girl.

=== Recruitment and friendship with Steve Clark ===
After Willis was fired due to alcohol problems, Joe Elliott called and asked Collen to audition. He was asked to perform the solos on the songs "Stagefright" and "Photograph" during the recording sessions of Pyromania. Mutt Lange, the band's producer, said to Collen, "just have fun on it, play some solos on it". "Photograph", "Rock of Ages", "Foolin'", "Stagefright", and "Rock Till You Drop" were all songs that he played solos on. He and fellow guitarist Clark quickly bonded, becoming close friends and leading to the trademark dual-guitar sound of Def Leppard. Collen and Clark became known as the "Terror Twins", in recognition of their talents and hard drinking lifestyles. By this time, Collen had also become noted for his trademark bare-chested stage appearances.

=== Changes in lifestyle, death of Clark and Adrenalize sessions ===
In 1988, Collen quit drinking alcohol after having developed an addiction to it. He also stopped eating meat and adopted a generally healthy lifestyle. According to Collen, he had begun suffering from blackouts due to alcohol and stopped drinking when he realized that his addiction was starting to dominate his life. Clark died due to alcohol abuse in early 1991.

After Clark died, Collen was faced with the challenge of dealing with the loss of a friend and bandmate as well as the burden and responsibility of the Adrenalize recordings. Recording the parts that had been written for Clark proved difficult. While Clark's playing style was rhythmic, melodic and sometimes even characterized as "sloppy", Collen's style was technical and precise. The contrast between their playing styles made it challenging to mimic the sound of Clark's guitar work. Due to the aftermath of Clark's death, as well as the issues with the recording of Adrenalize, Collen seriously considered leaving Def Leppard. According to Elliott, Collen did not want to continue in the band without Clark and said, "I'd rather be a plumber".

Clark would ultimately be replaced as the band's co-lead guitarist by Vivian Campbell, formerly of Dio and Whitesnake, shortly before the Adrenalize tour. The hiring of Campbell relieved Collen of some of the pressures of the "overkill" production style of Def Leppard, as well as the challenge of reproducing Clark's guitar parts for live shows.

== Side projects ==
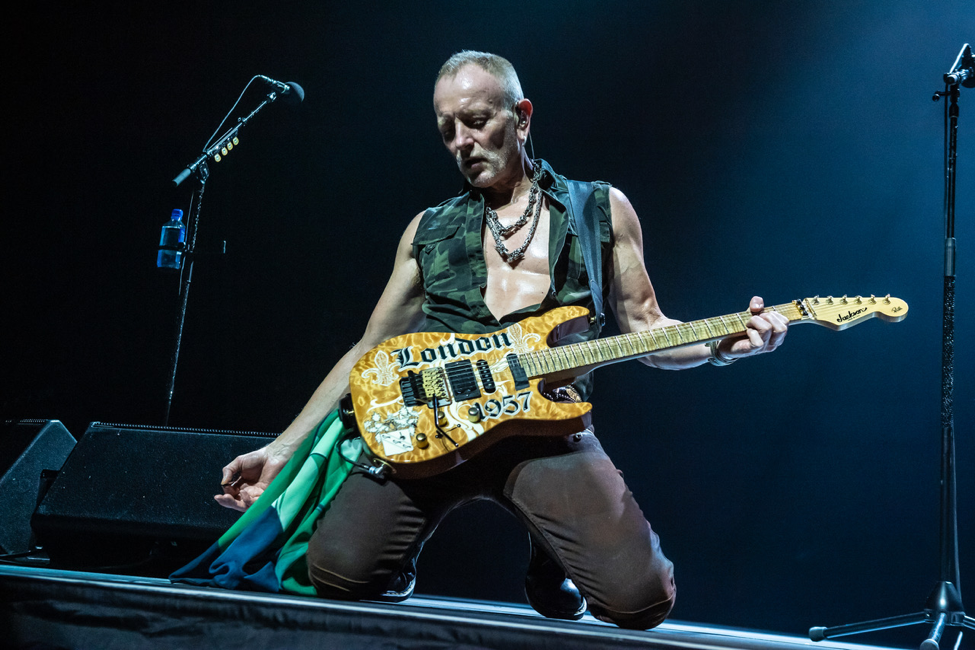
Collen performing in 2018

Collen has been involved in several side projects over his career, most notably the band Man Raze, formed as a joint collaboration with former Girl bandmate Simon Laffy as bassist and drummer Paul Cook from the Sex Pistols.

Collen played lead guitar on Donny Osmond's song "Just Between You and Me" in 1990. Due to his band disapproving of him playing on this song, he was credited as Rory James Collen on the track.

In 1990, Collen co-produced the On the Edge album of the Australian band BB Steal.

In 1991, Collen offered a song he had written, "Miss You in a Heartbeat" to the band The Law, which was featured on the band's self-titled album. This album was the band's only release. "Miss You in a Heartbeat" was later recorded and released by Def Leppard.

In 1993, Collen executive produced the album Sublime to the Ridiculous for the band, Sheer Greed, composed of former members of Girl, an act Collen was also associated earlier in his career.

Collen has also worked in side projects with Def Leppard singer Joe Elliott. One of these recent projects was a tribute to David Bowie and Mick Ronson. He and Elliott also joined with Trevor Bolder and Mick "Woody" Woodmansey from Spiders from Mars and keyboardist Dick Decent to form the band Cybernauts. In 2001 they released a live album of Bowie songs.

In 1996, Collen performed as a featured guitarist on the Jeffology: A Guitar Chronicle album – a tribute album to Jeff Beck. Collen performed on the single, "'Cause We've Ended As Lovers" from the album.

In 2010, Collen recorded the song "Hard Times Celebrate" with rapper Bazaar Royale, featured on the album "The Ride."

Collen formed a blues project by the name of Delta Deep with vocalist Debbi Blackwell Cook of the 1980s group The Jammers, which released an eponymous debut album in 2015.

In 2017, Collen was featured on three tracks of the reunited The Professionals album "What in the World."

Collen joined Joe Satriani and John Petrucci on the 2018 edition of the G3 Tour in the United States.

== Personal life ==
Collen has lived in the United States for 35 years and resides in Orange County, California. He commented, "I'm almost a California native now." He has five children: Rory (b. 1990), Samantha (b. 2004), Savannah (b. 2009), Charlotte (b. 2014) and Jaxson (b. 2018). He was married to actress Jacqueline Collen-Tarolly (1989) and Anita Thomas-Collen (1999). He married actress and costume designer Helen L. Simmons in 2010.

Collen is vegan and had previously been vegetarian since 1983 Collen is also colorblind.

Collen is known for his dedication to fitness and has trained extensively in martial arts for over 20 years. He began his martial arts training in Kenpo Karate, earning a black belt. He also has studied kickboxing with Benny Urquidez and Muay Thai with Jean Carillo.

== Equipment ==
In 1989, Collen worked with Jackson Guitars to develop the PC1 Archtop "ergonomically correct" electric guitar, although according to Collen, he designed them because "they looked cool", and they ended up having bad balance as well as a "really weird shape". Subsequently, Collen and Jackson developed the standard PC1 series.

As of 2011, his live rig with Def Leppard consists of various Jackson PC1 guitars (some modified), all equipped with DiMarzio pickups, Floyd Rose tremolo units, and a Floyd Rose sustainer driver. Collen uses several Fender acoustic guitars. Collen uses D'Addario 0.13–0.54 and 0.13–0.56 gauge strings, and he uses steel picks.

== Discography ==
=== with Girl ===
- Sheer Greed (1980)
- Wasted Youth (1981)
- Killing Time (1997)
- Live at the Marquee (2001)

=== with Def Leppard ===
- Pyromania (1983) (tracks 1–3, 6 & 7)
- Hysteria (1987)
- Adrenalize (1992)
- Retro Active (1993)
- Slang (1996)
- Euphoria (1999)
- X (2002)
- Yeah! (2006)
- Songs from the Sparkle Lounge (2008)
- Mirror Ball – Live & More (2011)
- Viva! Hysteria (2013)
- Def Leppard (2015)
- Diamond Star Halos (2022)
- Drastic Symphonies (2023)

=== with Man Raze ===
- Surreal (2008)
- PunkFunkRootsRock (2011)

=== with Delta Deep ===
- Delta Deep (2018)
