= Def Leppard =

English rock band

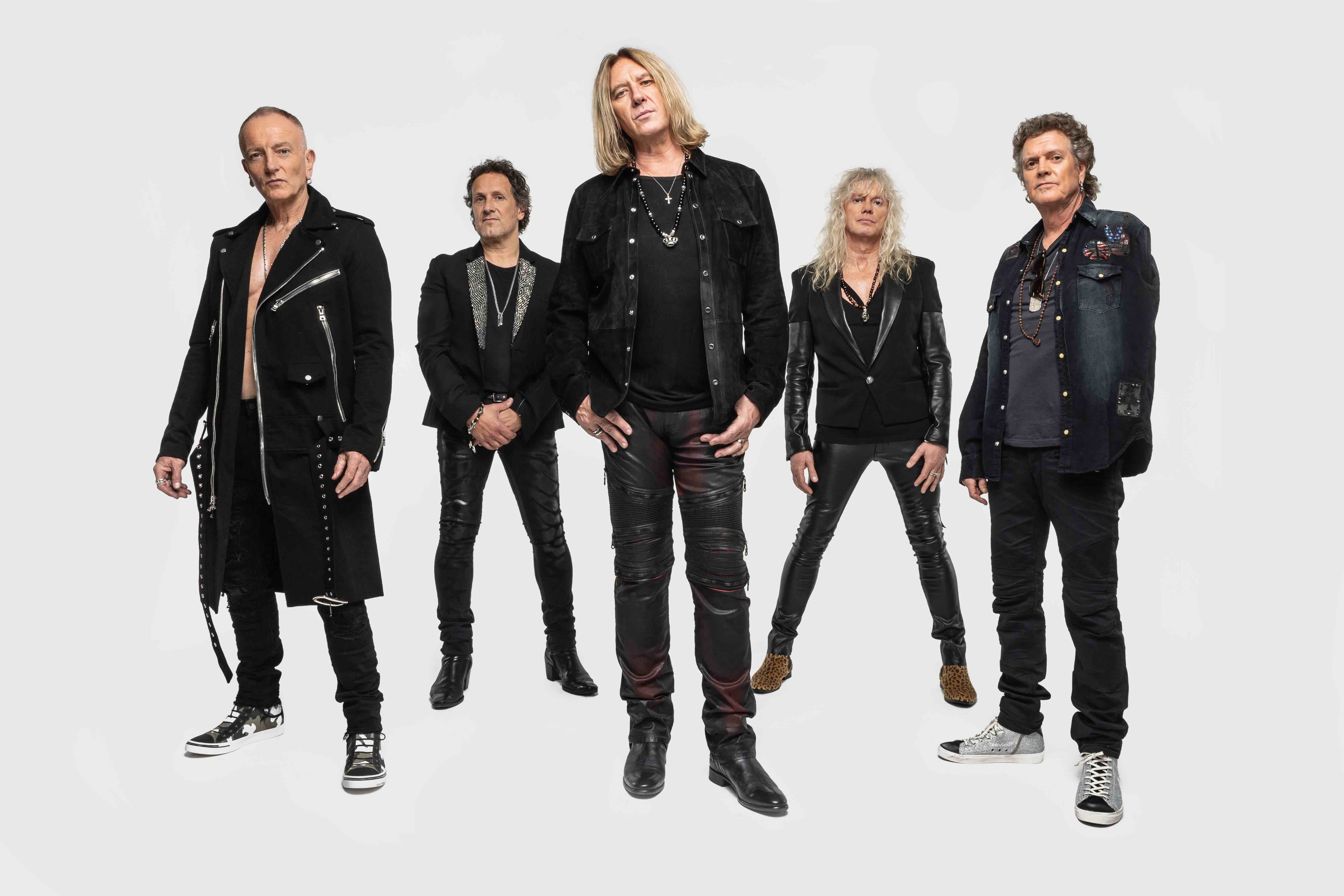
- Def Leppard band members in 2018: Phil Collen, Vivian Campbell, Joe Elliott, Rick Savage and Rick Allen

Background information
- Also known as: Atomic Mass (1976–1977); Ded Flatbird (2013)
- Origin: Sheffield, England
- Genres: Hard rock; glam metal; arena rock; power pop; heavy metal (early)
- Works: Discography
- Years active: 1976–present
- Labels: Jugoton; Croatia Records; Mercury; Universal; Phonogram; Vertigo; PolyGram; Bludgeon-Riffola; Island; Frontiers; earMUSIC
- Spinoffs: Cybernauts
- Members: Rick Savage; Joe Elliott; Rick Allen; Phil Collen; Vivian Campbell
- Past members: Steve Clark; Pete Willis; Tony Kenning
- Website: defleppard.com

Def Leppard are an English rock band formed in Sheffield in 1976. Since 1992, the band has consisted of Rick Savage (bass, backing vocals), Joe Elliott (lead vocals), Rick Allen (drums), Phil Collen (guitar, backing vocals), and Vivian Campbell (guitar, backing vocals). They became part of the new wave of British heavy metal of the early 1980s.

The band's first album, 1980's On Through the Night, reached the Top 15 in the UK but received little notice elsewhere. Their second album, 1981's High 'n' Dry, was produced by Mutt Lange, who helped them to define their melodic hard rock style. The album's most popular track, "Bringin' On the Heartbreak", became one of the first rock videos played on MTV in 1982. Their next studio album, Pyromania, the first with Collen featured on five tracks replacing guitarist Pete Willis who played rhythm guitar on the entire album before getting fired, was released in January 1983, with "Photograph" and "Rock of Ages" both topping the US Rock Tracks chart and reaching the top 20 of the Hot 100. Reaching No. 2 on the US album chart, Pyromania was certified Diamond in the US. The band's fourth album, the more pop-oriented Hysteria (1987), topped the UK, US, Canadian and Australian charts and remained on the charts for over two years. It has sold over 15 million copies worldwide, making it one of the best-selling albums of all time. Hysteria spawned six Top 20 US singles: The US Billboard Hot 100 No. 1 "Love Bites", "Pour Some Sugar on Me" (US No. 2), "Hysteria", "Armageddon It" (US No. 3), "Animal" (at No. 6, the biggest UK hit), and "Rocket".

Following the death of guitarist Steve Clark in 1991, the band recorded their next studio album, Adrenalize (1992), as a four-piece before adding Campbell for the subsequent tour. The album reached No. 1 on the UK, US and Australian charts. It contained several hits, including the Billboard chart-topper "Let's Get Rocked". The album's third single, "Have You Ever Needed Someone So Bad", was a Top 10 song in the US, UK and Canada. Adrenalize went on to sell over eight million copies worldwide. The band's 1993 album, Retro Active, contained the acoustic Top 5 hit "Two Steps Behind". Their greatest-hits album, Vault (1995), featured the UK No. 2 hit "When Love & Hate Collide" and reached the Top 10 in several countries.

As one of the world's best-selling music artists, Def Leppard have sold more than 100 million records worldwide. They have received RIAA diamond certification for two albums, Pyromania and Hysteria, making them one of only five rock bands (the others are Led Zeppelin, the Beatles, Van Halen, and Pink Floyd) with two original studio albums that have sold more than 10 million copies in the US. Def Leppard were ranked No. 31 in VH1's "100 Greatest Artists of Hard Rock" and No. 70 in "100 Greatest Artists of All Time". They were inducted into the Rock and Roll Hall of Fame in 2019.

== History ==
=== Atomic Mass and formation (1976–1979) ===
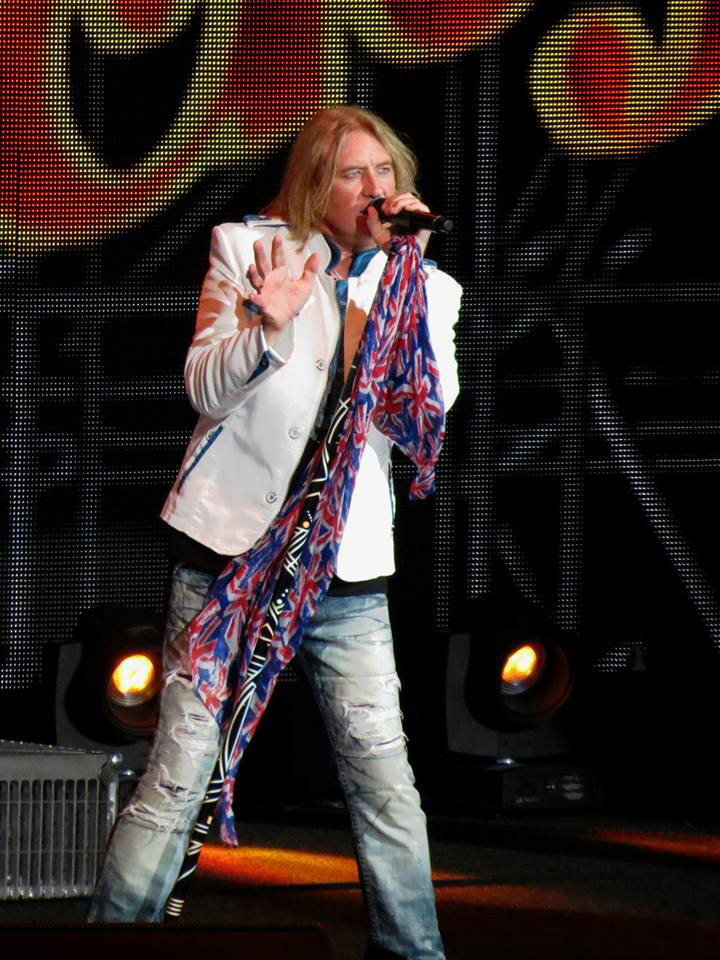
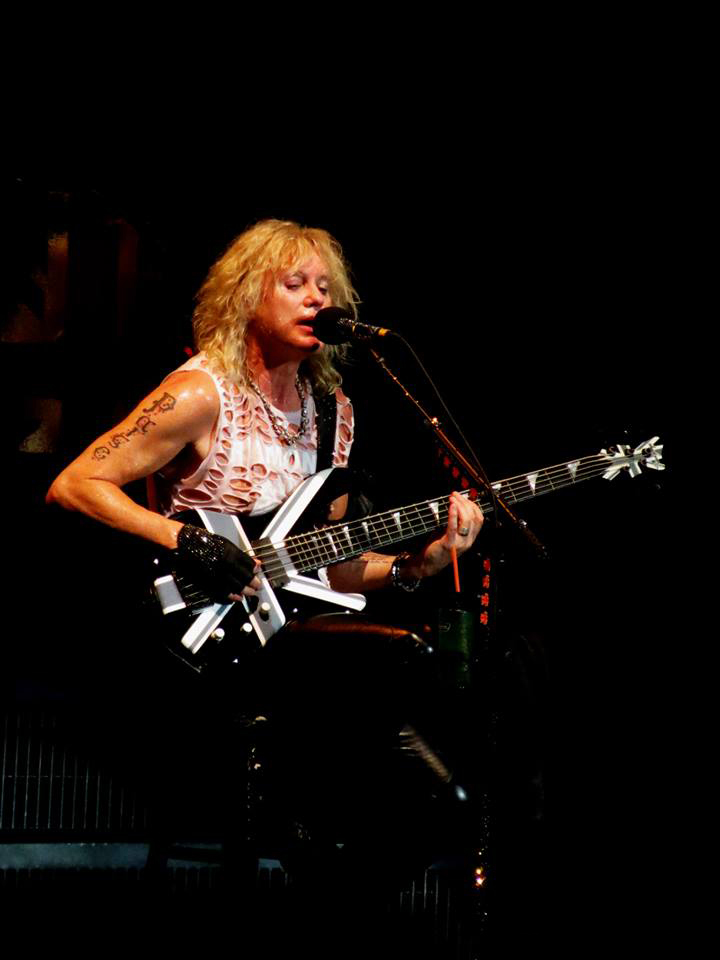
Vocalist Joe Elliott (left) and bassist Rick Savage (right), pictured in 2014, are the sole remaining original members of Def Leppard.

Rick Savage, Tony Kenning, and Pete Doubleday, all students at Tapton School in Sheffield, South Yorkshire, formed a band called Atomic Mass in 1976. Pete Willis joined in 1977, departing briefly but returning full time. The band originally consisted of Doubleday (and later Willis) on guitar, Savage on bass guitar after briefly playing guitar, Kenning on drums, Andy Nicholas on bass and Nick Mackley on lead vocals. Other members to come and go were Paul Holland (vocals), Melanie Davis (guitars, keyboards, violin, bass), Paul Hampshire (lead guitar) and Nick Hawnt (vocals). Only 18 at the time, Joe Elliott tried out for the band as a guitarist following a chance meeting with Willis after missing a bus in November 1977. During his audition it was decided that he was better suited to be the lead singer. The band's initial rehearsals took place at Portland Works, and their first gig was in the dining hall in A Block in Westfield School in Mosborough, Sheffield.

Elliott proposed the name "Deaf Leopard" which was originally a band name he thought of while designing band posters in art class. At Kenning's suggestion, the spelling was slightly modified to make the name seem less like that of a punk band. In January 1978, Steve Clark joined the band. According to Elliott, he successfully auditioned for the band by playing Lynyrd Skynyrd's "Free Bird" in its entirety.

In November, just prior to recording sessions for a three-song release known as The Def Leppard E.P., Kenning abruptly left the band; he later formed the band Cairo. He was replaced for those sessions by Frank Noon. By the end of the month, Rick Allen, then only 15 years old, had joined the band as its full-time drummer. Sales of the EP soared after the track "Getcha Rocks Off" was given extensive airtime by BBC Radio 1 DJ John Peel, considered at the time to be a champion of punk rock and new wave music.

Throughout 1979, the band developed a loyal following among British hard rock and heavy metal fans and were considered among the leaders of the new wave of British heavy metal movement. Their growing popularity led to a record deal with the major label Phonogram/Vertigo (Mercury Records in the US). Def Leppard's original management, MSB, a local duo consisting of Pete Martin and Frank Stuart-Brown, were fired after Martin and Joe Elliott got into a fistfight over an incident on the road. The band approached Peter Mensch of Leber-Krebs management, who had booked them on a tour of the UK supporting AC/DC. Mensch, who admitted that he had had his eye on the band, became their manager.

=== On Through the Night and High 'n' Dry (1980–1981) ===
Def Leppard's debut album, On Through the Night, was released on 14 March 1980. Although the album hit the Top 15 in the UK, many early fans were turned off by the perception that the band was trying too hard to appeal to American audiences by recording songs such as "Hello America" and touring more in the US (supporting Pat Travers, AC/DC, and Ted Nugent); a performance at the Reading Festival in August was marred when audience members expressed their displeasure by pelting the band with beer cans and bottles filled with urine. This incident was partially blamed on a cover story in Sounds music newspaper by the journalist Geoff Barton titled, "Has the Leppard changed its spots?", accusing the band of selling out to the American market. In a documentary on the band recorded for BBC 2, Barton recalls feelings of guilt over the story and having a "stand-up row" with the band's manager, Mensch, backstage at the show. In the documentary series Metal Evolution, Joe Elliott says that the media had exaggerated the event and all bands on the day had experienced 'abuse' from the crowd.

The band had by then caught the attention of AC/DC producer Robert John "Mutt" Lange, who agreed to work on their second album, High 'n' Dry, released on 6 July 1981. Lange's meticulous approach in the studio helped them begin to define their sound. Despite the album's unimpressive sales figures (it only peaked at number 26 in the UK and 38 in the US), the band's video for "Bringin' On the Heartbreak" became one of the first metal videos played on MTV in 1982, bringing the band increased visibility in the US. The band continued to use the up-and-coming music television industry to reach fans over the years with their unique videos and the extravagance of their concerts. After the album's release, European and American tours followed. The band opened for Ozzy Osbourne and Blackfoot.

=== Lineup changes and Pyromania (1982–1983) ===
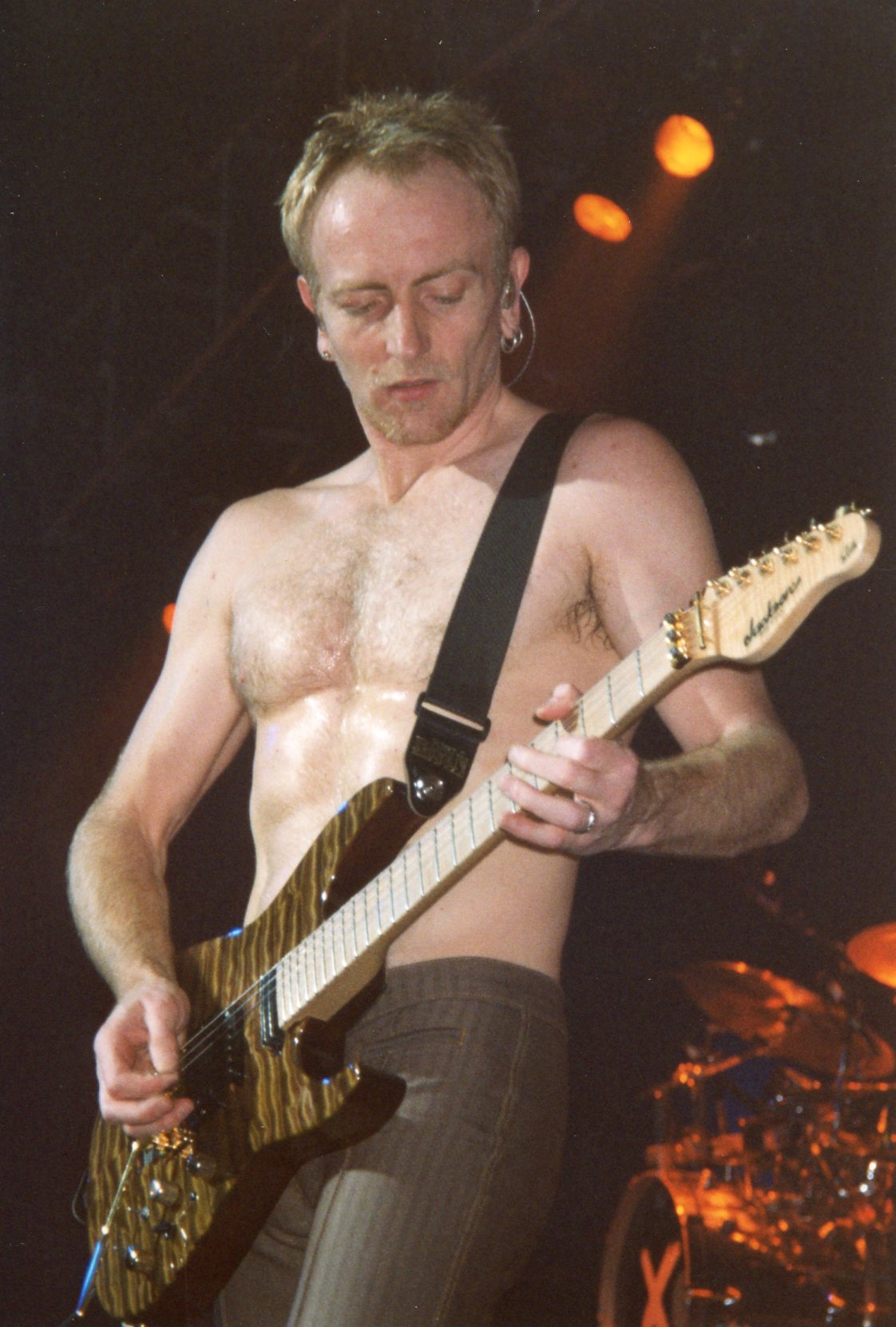
Guitarist Phil Collen (pictured in 2003) joined the band in 1982.

On 11 July 1982, Pete Willis was fired due to excessive alcohol consumption on the job and was replaced by Phil Collen of Girl the next day. This personnel change took place during the recording of their third album, Pyromania, which was released on 20 January 1983 and also produced by Lange. The cover artwork depicted a cartoon image of a huge flame emerging from the top floor of a skyscraper, with a bullseye aimed at the flame. The lead single, "Photograph", turned Def Leppard into a household name, supplanting Michael Jackson's "Beat It" as the most requested video on MTV and becoming a staple of rock radio (holding the number 1 position on the US Album Rock Track Chart for six weeks), and sparked a headline tour across the US. The second single, 'Rock of Ages, also reached number 1 on the Rock Tracks chart, with both singles reaching the Top 20 of the Hot 100 ("Photograph" number 12 and "Rock of Ages" number 16), unusual for hard rock songs.

Fuelled by "Photograph", "Rock of Ages", and the third single "Foolin'", Pyromania went on to sell six million copies in 1983 (more than 100,000 copies every week in that year) and was held from the top of the US charts only by Michael Jackson's Thriller. With the album's massive success, Pyromania was the catalyst for the 1980s pop-metal movement. In 2004, Pyromania was certified Diamond having sold over 10 million copies in the US; it was also certified 7× platinum in Canada, where it had peaked at number 4, its second highest certification. With their music videos becoming a staple of MTV Rolling Stone named them among the artists of the Second British Invasion. The Pyromania tour began in England at the Marquee Club on Wardour Street, Soho, London in February 1983. Def Leppard's US tour in support of the album began in March opening for Billy Squier and ended with a headlining performance before an audience of 55,000 at Jack Murphy Stadium in San Diego, California in September. As a testament to the band's popularity at the time, a US Gallup poll in 1984 saw Def Leppard voted as favourite rock band over the Rolling Stones, AC/DC, and Journey. Pyromania was not as successful in their native UK where it reached number 18 on the album chart.

=== Rick Allen car accident (1984) ===
Following their breakthrough, the band moved to Dublin in February 1984 for tax purposes to begin writing the follow-up to Pyromania. Mutt Lange initially joined in on the songwriting sessions but then suddenly declined to return as producer due to exhaustion. Jim Steinman of Meat Loaf's Bat Out of Hell was brought in. However, Steinman worked only briefly with the band, and the recording work was not released.

On the afternoon of 31 December 1984, drummer Rick Allen was involved in a car accident on the A57 road in the countryside a few miles west of Sheffield. While trying to pass another car at a high speed, he lost control of his Corvette C4, which hit a dry stone wall and entered a field; his left arm was severed. Doctors initially reattached the arm, but it was later amputated due to an infection.

=== Hysteria (1985–1989) ===
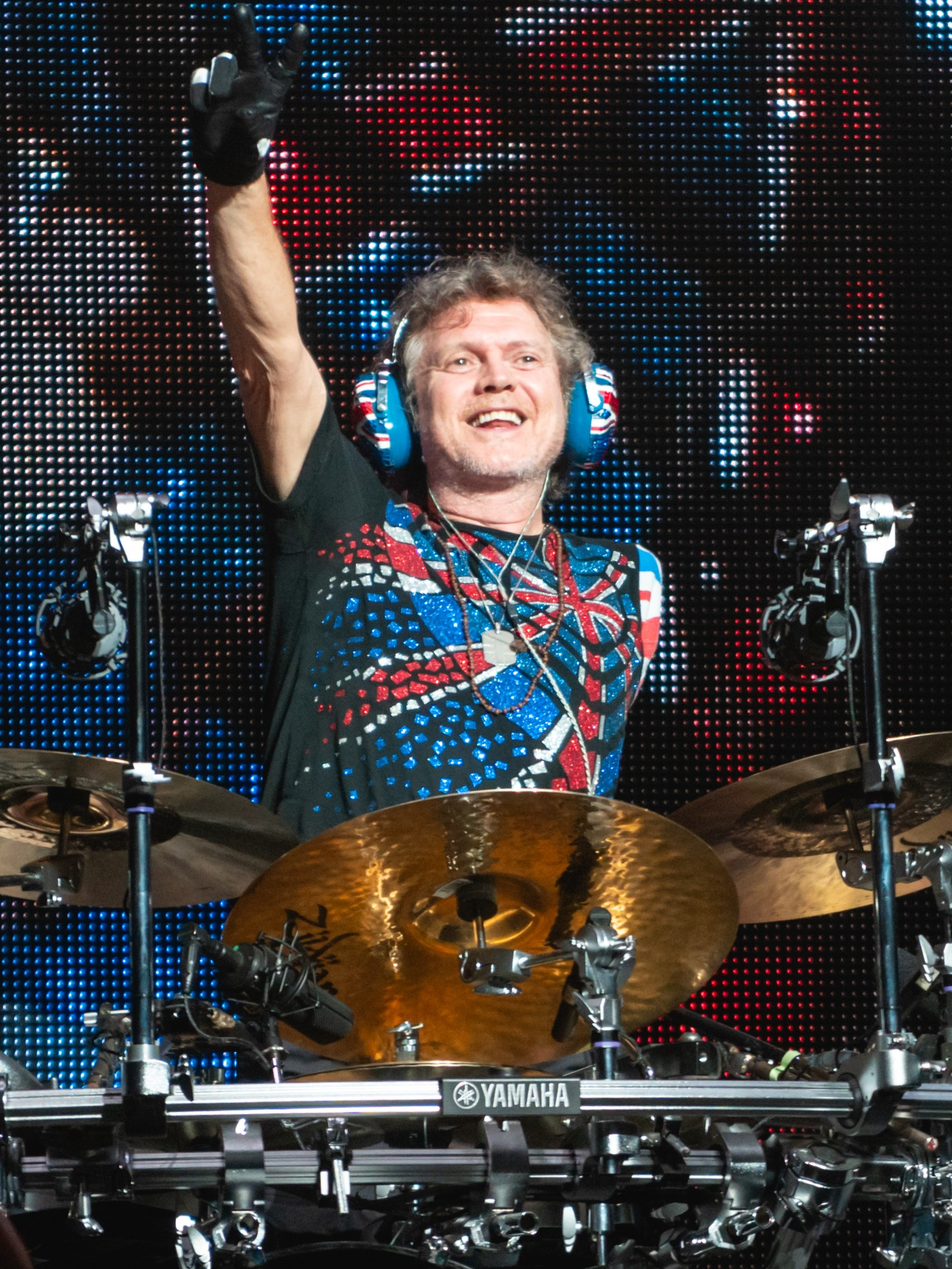
After losing his left arm in a car accident, drummer Rick Allen (pictured in 2018) used his feet to play a custom electronic drum kit.

Despite the severity of the accident, Rick Allen was committed to continuing his role as Def Leppard's drummer. Soon after, Allen realised that he could use his legs to do some of the drumming work previously done with his arms. He then worked with Simmons to design a custom electronic drum kit. The other members of the band supported Allen's recovery and never sought a replacement. Allen was placed in a separate studio to practice his new drums. After a few months, Allen gathered the band together and performed the intro to the Led Zeppelin version of "When the Levee Breaks" to showcase his progress to the band. Joe Elliott reports this as being a "very emotional moment". During this period, Mutt Lange returned as producer. Def Leppard brought in Jeff Rich in August 1986 to play alongside Allen during Def Leppard's warm-up mini tour of Ireland. When Rich turned up late for a gig, he and the band realised Allen could drum alone. Allen's comeback was sealed at the 1986 Monsters of Rock festival in England, with an emotionally charged ovation after his introduction by Joe Elliott.

After over three years of recording, Def Leppard's fourth album, Hysteria, was released on 3 August 1987. One of the first singles from the album, "Animal", became the band's first Top 10 hit in the UK, reaching No. 6 on the UK Singles Chart. "Animal" also started their run of ten consecutive US Billboard Hot 100 Top 40 singles. The next single off Hysteria, its mid-tempo title track, became the band's first Top 10 single in the US, and, peaking at number 13, their highest-charting song in Canada to that date. Hysteria topped the UK Album Charts in its first week of release, and spent 105 weeks on the chart. Initial US album sales were relatively slow (compared to Pyromania) until the release of the fourth single, "Pour Some Sugar on Me". The song hit No. 2, on the Hot 100 and Hysteria finally reached the top of the US Billboard 200 in July 1988. Although "Pour Some Sugar On Me" was not initially a big hit in other countries (number 18 in the UK, number 22 in Canada, and number 26 in Australia), it has come to be regarded as the band's signature song, and was ranked No. 2 on VH1's "100 Greatest Songs of the 80s" in 2006. Hysteria also topped the album charts in Canada, Australia, New Zealand and Norway, at No. 10, was their first album to chart in Germany, and was eventually certified Diamond in sales in the US and 13× Platinum in Canada.

The band's UK success saw them nominated for the 1988 Brit Award for Best British Group. In October 1988, the power ballad "Love Bites" reached number one on the Billboard Hot 100]]. About reaching No. 1 with "Love Bites", Elliot reflected: "It's strange because we’d been to No. 1 with the album. So now we wanted a No. 1 single because we'd never had one. So it was like, 'come on! come on!' When we got there, it was, as you can imagine, a 'yes!' moment." It was a Top 10 hit in several other countries, including reaching number six in Canada. In January 1989, the band scored another US Top five hit with "Armageddon It", and by spring of 1989 the final single "Rocket" was in the Top 15 in the US and several other countries. Wanting to give fans something new after the massive radio and video airplay for not only the seven singles but also the album tracks that radio DJs were playing off the album, the band performed "Tear It Down", a Hysteria B-side at the 1989 MTV Video Music Awards.

Hysteria is one of only a handful of albums that has charted seven singles or more on the US Hot 100: "Women" (No. 80), "Animal" (No. 19), "Hysteria" (No. 10), "Pour Some Sugar on Me" (No. 2), "Love Bites (No. 1), "Armageddon It" (No. 3), and "Rocket" (No. 12). Aside from "Women", these same songs all made the Top 25 on the UK Singles chart. It remained on the charts for three years and has sold over 15 million copies worldwide, making it one of the best-selling albums of all time. Equally successful was the accompanying 16-month Hysteria tour, in which the band performed in the round. This concept proved wildly popular with fans (as seen in the videos for "Pour Some Sugar on Me" and "Armageddon It") and was used again for the Adrenalize tour.

At the 1989 Brit Awards held at the Royal Albert Hall in London, Def Leppard were again a nominee for Best British Group, and the band performed "Pour Some Sugar on Me" at the ceremony. At the 1989 American Music Awards, Def Leppard won Favorite Heavy Metal/Hard Rock Artist, as well as Favorite Heavy Metal/Hard Rock Album (for Hysteria).

=== Adrenalize, Retro Active, and Slang (1990–1997) ===
Following Hysteria, the band quickly set out to work on their fifth album, hoping to avoid another lengthy gap. Steve Clark's alcoholism worsened to the point that he was constantly in and out of rehab. Recording sessions suffered from this distraction, and in mid-1990, Clark was granted a six-month leave of absence from the band. Clark died from a mix of prescription drugs and alcohol on 8 January 1991, in his London home. The remaining band members decided to carry on and recorded the album as a four-piece, with Collen mimicking Clark's style on his intended guitar parts.

Def Leppard's fifth album, Adrenalize, was finally released on 31 March 1992. The album simultaneously entered at number one on both the UK and US album charts, staying number one on the latter for five weeks, while also reaching the summit on the Canadian and Australian charts and hitting No. 8 in Germany. The first single, the anthemic "Let's Get Rocked", was an instant hit and remains the band's highest-charting song ever in several countries, including the UK (No. 2), Canada (No. 3), Australia (No. 6) and Germany (No. 22), while reaching No. 1 on the US Rock Tracks chart and No. 15 on the Billboard Hot 100. The band performed the song at the 1992 MTV Video Music Awards where it was nominated for Best Video of the Year. Like with Hysteria, several singles were released off Adrenalize, including the rocker "Make Love Like a Man", the ballad "Have You Ever Needed Someone So Bad" and the mid-tempo "Heaven Is", each of which made the Top 15 in the UK, with "Have You Ever Needed Someone So Bad" being the most successful track in Canada (No. 7) and on the US Hot 100 (No. 12) . Another single, the mid-tempo "Stand Up (Kick Love into Motion)", was a hit in Canada, peaking at No. 11, and also reached No. 1 on the US Rock Tracks chart, edging out "Make Love Like a Man" (No. 3) as the second most successful track off the album on US rock radio.

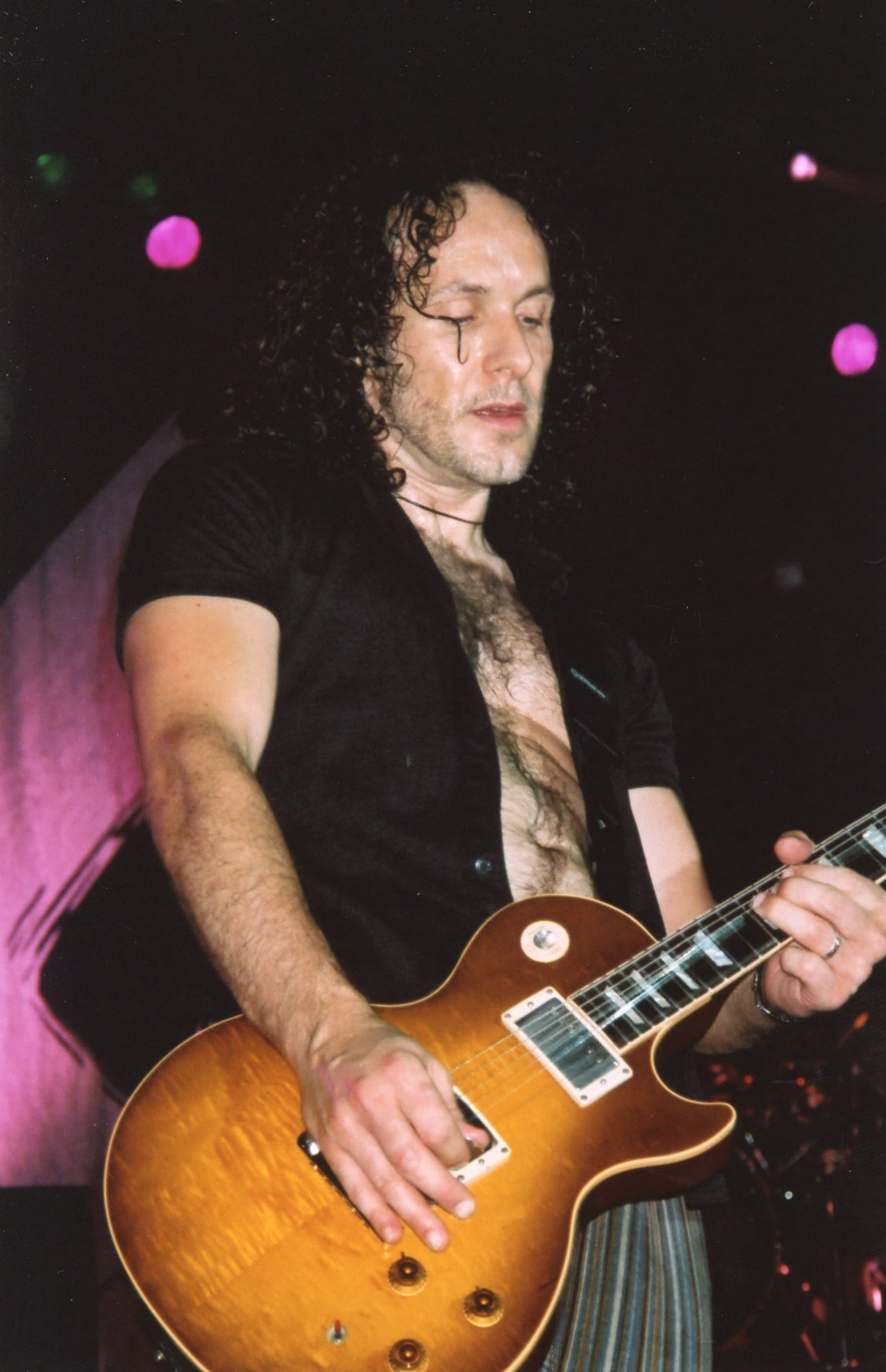
Guitarist Vivian Campbell in 2003. He joined Def Leppard in 1992.

In a period between late-1991 and early 1992, auditions for another guitarist commenced. Among the guitarists who auditioned included Adrian Smith, John Sykes, and Gary Hoey. Ultimately, the band chose Vivian Campbell in 1992, formerly of Dio and Whitesnake. In April 1992, Def Leppard appeared at The Freddie Mercury Tribute Concert at Wembley Stadium, London, performing a three-song set of "Animal", "Let's Get Rocked" and Queen's "Now I'm Here" with guitarist Brian May. Joe Elliott later performed "Tie Your Mother Down" with the remaining members of Queen and Guns N' Roses guitarist Slash. Another world tour followed but the band's fortunes began to be affected by the rise of alternative rock, including grunge. Amidst the increasing popularity of alternative rock, the band decided to balance their original image as rebellious rock stars with a slightly friendlier energy, combining heavy metal with melodies and hooks more reminiscent of pop music. On 6 June 1993, Def Leppard performed the first ever rock concert at the Don Valley Stadium in their home city of Sheffield before an audience of over 50,000.

A collection of B-sides and unreleased tracks recorded between 1984 and 1993, called Retro Active, was released in October 1993, preceded by the success of the acoustic ballad "Two Steps Behind" (from the Arnold Schwarzenegger film Last Action Hero). The song charted in many countries, reaching Top 5 in Canada and peaking at No. 12 in the US, where it was their last significant hit song. Another single from Retro Active, "Miss You in a Heartbeat", was also successful in Canada (No. 19) while a cover of Sweet's "Action" was popular in the UK, reaching No. 14. Retro Active made the Top 10 in the UK, US, and Canada and has sold 3 million copies worldwide to date. In 1995, Def Leppard issued their first greatest hits collection, Vault: Def Leppard Greatest Hits (1980–1995), which reached number 3 in the UK, Top 10 in several other countries, and eventually sold over 5 million copies in the US. Alternate track listings of the album were issued for North America, the UK, and Japan. The compilation included a new track, the power ballad "When Love & Hate Collide", which became their biggest ever hit in the UK, hitting No. 2 on the UK Singles Chart, while also hitting No. 6 in Canada., their last major hit single in both countries, but barely charted in the US.

On 23 October 1995, the band entered the Guinness Book of World Records by performing three concerts on three continents in one day (Tangiers, Morocco; Sheffield, England; and Vancouver, Canada). Slang, released in May 1996, marked a drastic musical departure for the band by featuring darker lyrics and a stripped-down alternative rock edge. The band rehearsed and played the songs together in the studio instead of recording parts separately, resulting in a much more live-sounding album. The US audience reception for Slang and its subsequent tour was a major drop-off from a decade earlier, although Q Magazine nonetheless listed Slang as one of their Top Ten Albums of 1996. The album only reached No. 14 on the US album chart, and although the track "Work It Out" reached No. 6 on the US Rock Tracks chart, neither it or any of the other singles released off the album charted on the Hot 100. For the first time, a Def Leppard studio album peaked higher in the UK than in the US as it hit No. 5 there, with two singles, the album's title track (No. 17), and "Work It Out" (No. 22) performing well on the UK singles chart. In Canada, "Work It Out" was a Top 10 single and while the album only peaked at No. 12, it eventually still went double platinum in sales.

=== Euphoria, X, and Yeah! (1998–2007) ===
VH1 revived the band's fortunes in the US in 1998 by featuring them on one of the first episodes of Behind the Music. Re-runs of the episode yielded some of the series' highest ratings and brought the band's music back into the public consciousness (following years of burial by the alternative rock climate). The episode was even parodied on Saturday Night Live. In an effort to capitalise on this new momentum, Def Leppard returned to its classic sound with the 1999 album Euphoria. The first single, "Promises", reunited the band with Mutt Lange and hit the US Mainstream Rock Track charts at No. 1 for three weeks although it did not receive much play on Top 40 radio; it was also a moderate hit in the UK and Canada. Euphoria peaked at No. 11 in both the UK and US, and at No 14 in Germany, although it was less successful in Canada and Australia.

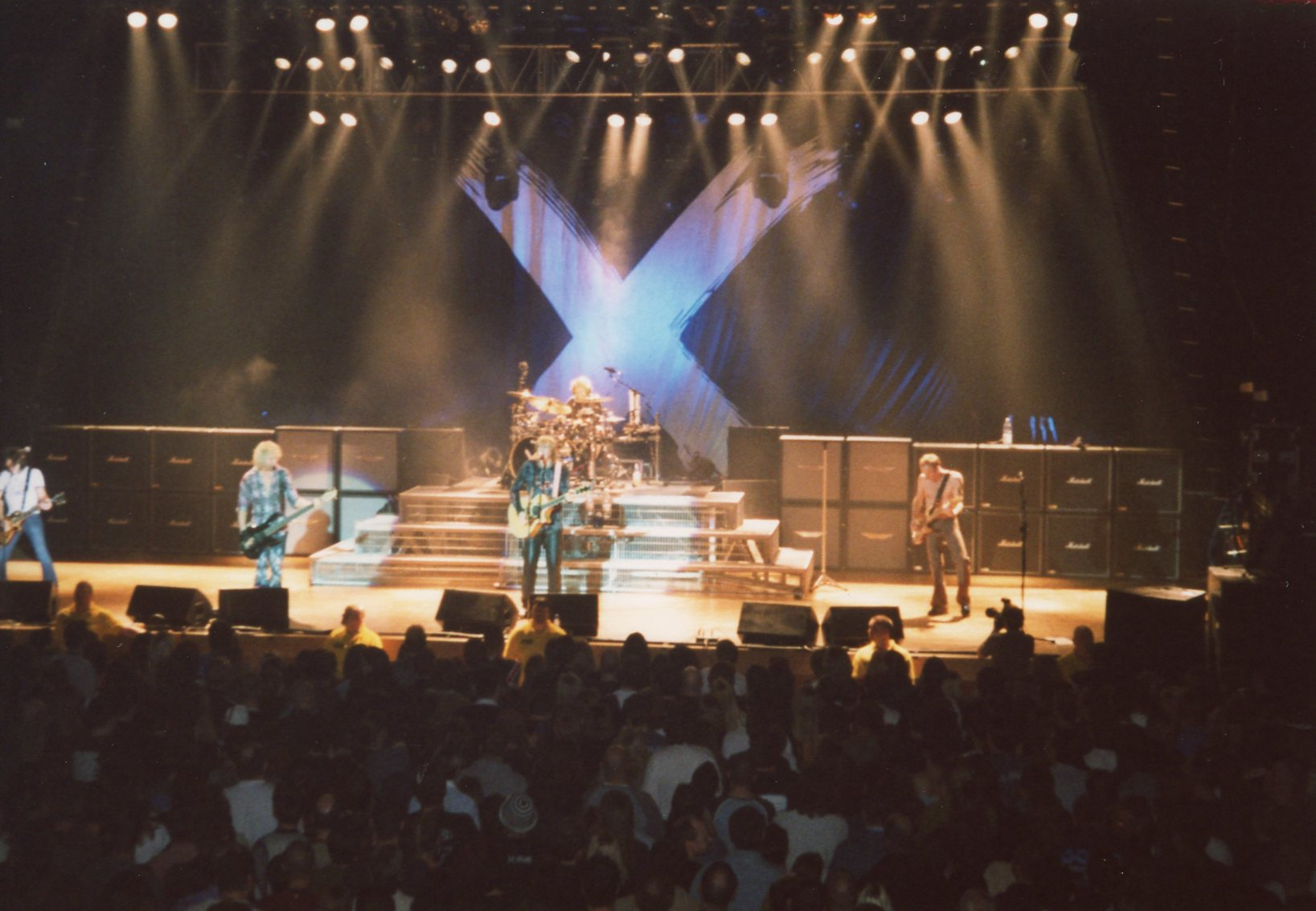
Def Leppard performing in Wolverhampton in February 2003.

On 5 September 2000, Def Leppard were inducted into Hollywood's RockWalk on Sunset Boulevard by their friend Brian May of Queen. In 2001, VH1 produced and aired Hysteria – The Def Leppard Story, a biopic that included Anthony Michael Hall as Mutt Lange and Amber Valletta as Lorelei Shellist (Steve Clark's girlfriend). The docudrama covered the band's history between 1977 through 1986, recounting the trials and triumphs of Rick Allen and Steve Clark.

Def Leppard's eighth album, X, saw the band's musical direction moving more towards pop and further away from the band's hard rock roots. X ultimately became the band's least successful release, peaking at No. 11 on the US Billboard 200. No. 14 on the UK Albums Chart, No. 12 in Canada, and No. 19 in Germany. Its first single, "Now", reached the Top 30 in the UK and Canada but missed the US Hot 100, only reaching No. 26 on the US Mainstream Rock Tracks chart.

An expanded and updated best-of collection, Best Of, was released internationally in October 2004. The North America-only version, Rock of Ages—The Definitive Collection, was released the following May. Def Leppard participated at the Live 8 show in Philadelphia and toured in the summer with Bryan Adams. In 2005, the band left their long-time management team, Q Prime, and signed with HK Management.

On 23 May 2006, Def Leppard released an all-covers album titled Yeah!. The disc pays homage to classic rock songs of their childhood, originally recorded by Blondie, The Kinks, Sweet, ELO, and Badfinger among others. Their cover of "How Does It Feel" by Slade was used as a non-album B-side. It debuted at No. 16 in the US, their tenth consecutive Top 20 album. The band toured to promote the album with Journey from June through November 2006 in Europe, the UK, and the US.

The band, along with Queen, Kiss, and Judas Priest, were the inaugural inductees of VH1 Rock Honors on 31 May 2006. During the show, The All-American Rejects paid homage to the band with a cover of "Photograph". Soon afterwards, they embarked on a US tour with Journey. That October, Hysteria was re-released in a two-disc deluxe edition format, which combined the original remastered album with B-sides, remixes, and bonus tracks from single releases. Def Leppard began their Downstage Thrust Tour, on 27 June, which took them across the US and into Canada.

=== Songs from the Sparkle Lounge (2008–2010) ===
On 25 April 2008, Def Leppard released their first album of new studio material in six years, Songs from the Sparkle Lounge. The album debuted at No. 5 on the Billboard 200 in the US. The first single was entitled "Nine Lives" and featured country singer Tim McGraw, who co-wrote the song with Joe Elliott, Phil Collen, and Rick Savage.

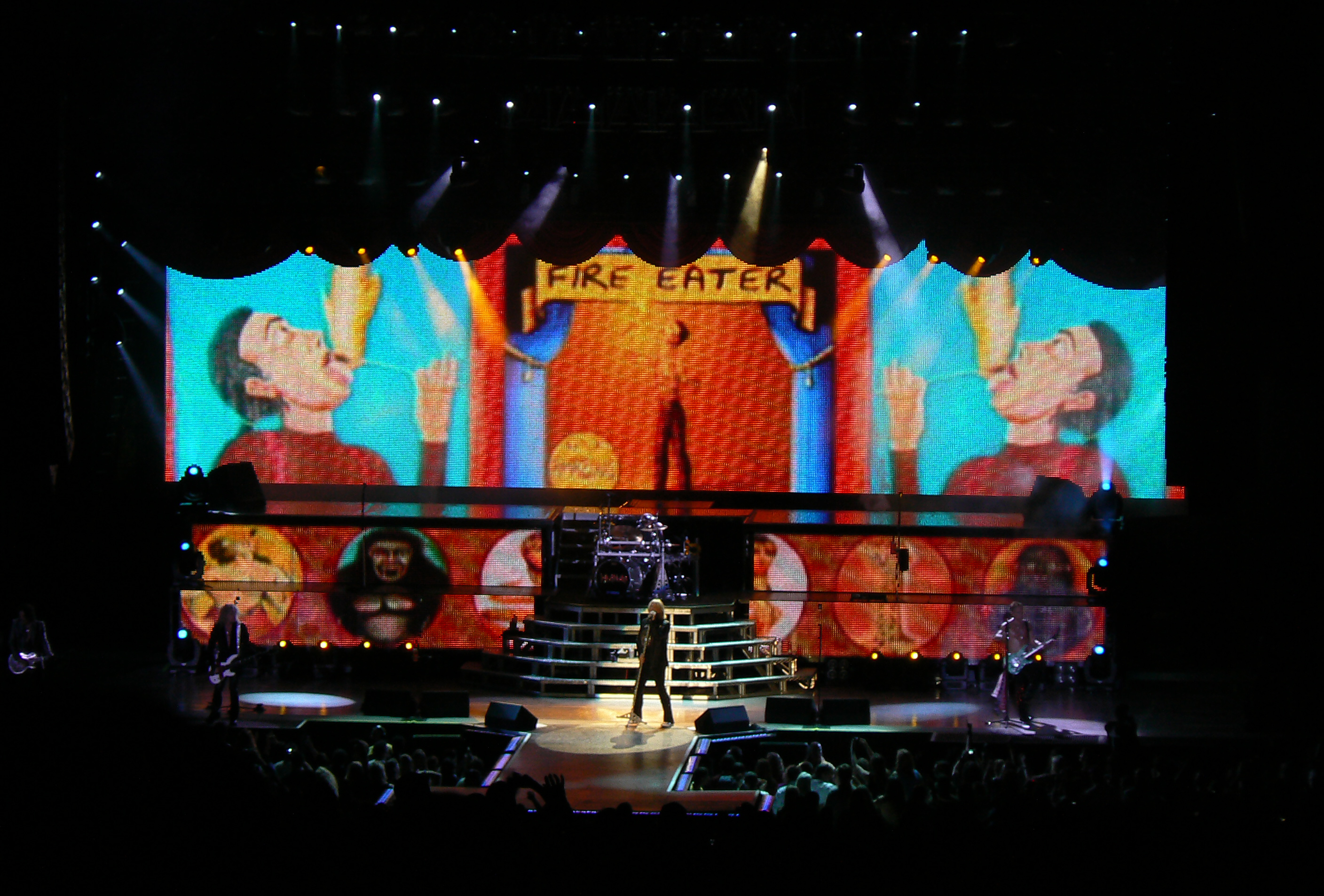
Def Leppard performing in Sacramento in September 2009.

A tour in support of the album began on 27 March 2008 in Greensboro, North Carolina, with Styx and REO Speedwagon. They also played several European rock festivals. An arena tour of the UK took place in June in which the band co-headlined with Whitesnake and were supported by Black Stone Cherry. The band then returned to Europe before coming back for a second leg of the UK tour in June. The first of these dates was at the Glasgow SECC on 17 June. Again they were joined by Whitesnake; however, hard rock band Thunder supported at some of these shows. Black Stone Cherry continued to support most of the dates, including some of the Thunder ones. Six shows which were cancelled during the USA/Canada leg of their world tour due to illnesses affecting Joe Elliott and Phil Collen were rescheduled and played in August of that year. On 11 June, Def Leppard announced further dates for their 2008 World Tour. The extension saw them visit Japan, Australia and New Zealand. Whitesnake continued to support Def Leppard for their Indian and Japanese dates. Def Leppard toured 41 US cities plus Toronto during mid-2009 with Poison and Cheap Trick and also headlined the Download Festival at Donington Park, England to a sell-out crowd of 83,000 with Whitesnake and ZZ Top.

In October 2008, Def Leppard played with country star Taylor Swift in a taped show in Nashville, Tennessee, in a show called CMT Crossroads: Taylor Swift and Def Leppard. This was released as a DVD on 16 June 2009 exclusively at Wal-Mart. The release was the best-selling DVD of the week, and the 10th best-selling Wal-Mart music release. In October 2009, the band announced that they would be cancelling the last leg of the 2009 North American tour, a total of 23 shows. The band cited, "unforeseen personal matters", as the reason for the cancellations. At the time, the band denied rumours about a break-up, saying, "We're not splitting. Not at all. We often joke, what else would we do? You just can't imagine doing anything else."

=== Touring, Viva! Hysteria (2011–2014) ===
After taking a year off from touring in 2010, the band announced on 22 February 2011 that they would be releasing their first live album in the summer. Mirror Ball – Live & More, a two-disc live album, with three new studio tracks. It was released in parts of Europe on 3 June, the rest of Europe on 6 June, and on 7 June in the US; it was announced at the same time that Def Leppard would perform at the Download Festival on 10 June 2011. Of the three new studio tracks, two were released as singles, the first single being "Undefeated" released in April 2011.

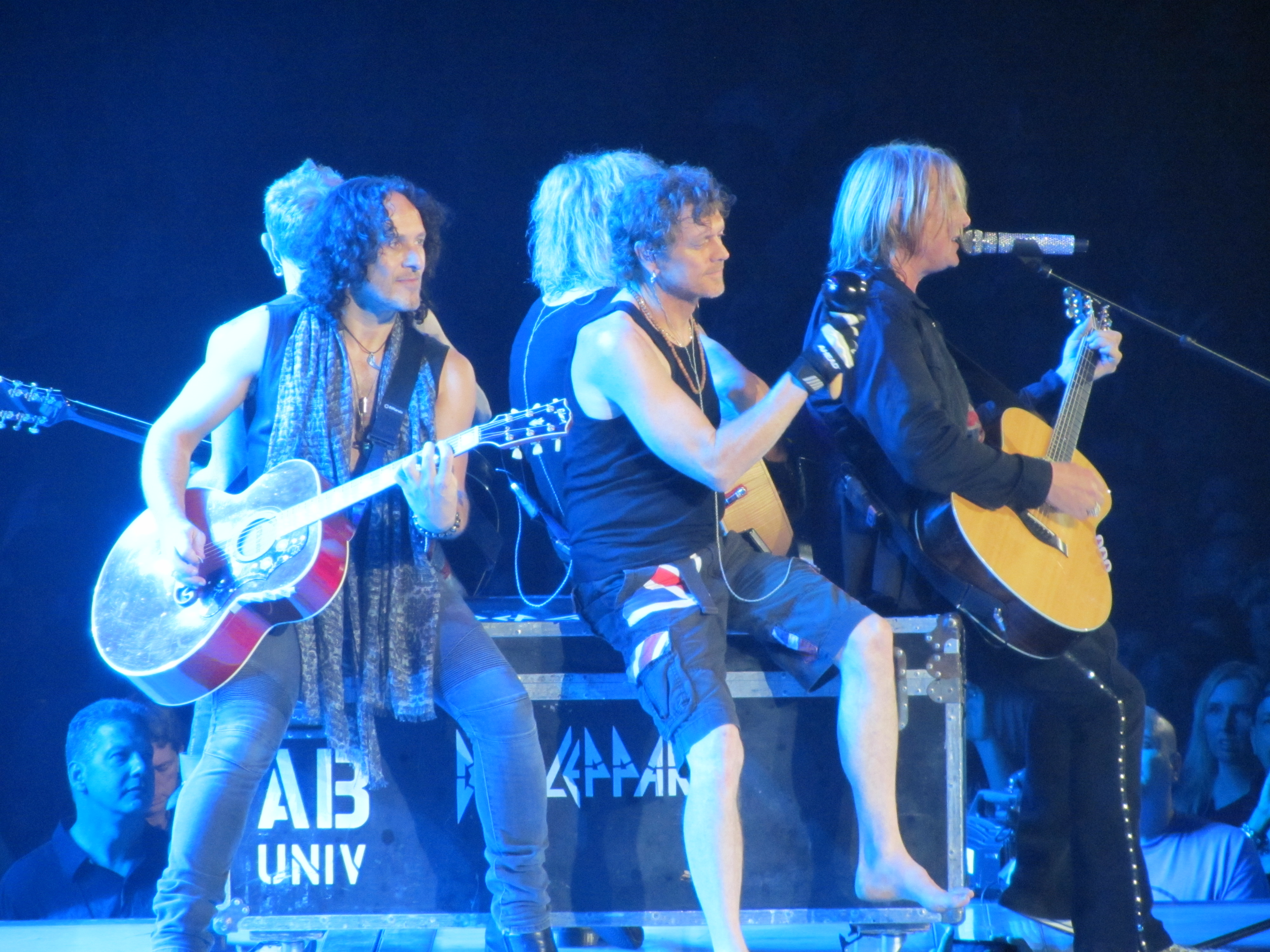
Def Leppard performing an acoustic set in Rosemont, 2012

Def Leppard embarked on a two-month US tour in the summer of 2011 with Heart, as well as another seven shows in Australia in October with The Choirboys and Heart, two shows in Japan in November, and six shows in the United Kingdom in December with Steel Panther and Mötley Crüe. The next year, they toured with Poison and Lita Ford from 20 June through 15 September, dubbed the "Rock Of Ages 2012 Tour".

The year after, Def Leppard played an 11-show residency at the Hard Rock Hotel and Casino in Las Vegas, Nevada from 22 March through to 13 April 2013. The residency, referred to as Viva! Hysteria, featured a two-part show, with the first half featuring Def Leppard opening for themselves, under the alias "Ded Flatbird", (jokingly called the best Def Leppard cover band in the world), when they played songs they very rarely play live, going back to "Good Morning Freedom", a B-side from the single "Hello America" released in February 1980, an era usually left untouched by the band. The opening set varied each night, from playing the best hits from albums like On Through the Night, Slang, and Euphoria, to being the entire first half of High 'n' Dry. The second half, and "main event" was Def Leppard, as themselves playing their best-selling album, Hysteria, from start to finish. A live album, also titled Viva! Hysteria was released on 22 October 2013. This was the first time the band had played an album live from start to finish. The band has re-recorded several hits and even the entire album Hysteria in an effort to circumvent their record label from future royalties, though of these re-recordings, only "Rock of Ages", "Pour Some Sugar on Me", and "Hysteria" have been released.

On 11 February 2014, the band released a remastered deluxe edition of their 1996 album Slang after much delay. The album, still coveted by many loyal fans of the band, now features 30 tracks including demos, B-sides, and unreleased material. From 23 June 2014 to 31 August 2014, Def Leppard and Kiss toured 42 cities, with one dollar per ticket donated to such military charities as Wounded Warrior Project. Def Leppard contributed one song, "Helen Wheels", to the Paul McCartney tribute album The Art of McCartney released on 18 November 2014. Joe Elliott also contributed another track, "Hi, Hi, Hi". At certain recent points in time the band had projects, such as a cartoon and a documentary, in development. However, these projects seem to have been shelved indefinitely. The band had originally planned to do another residency in Las Vegas, this time in honour of Pyromania (called Viva! Pyromania), but due to the "Heroes 2014" tour with Kiss, and the recording of their new studio album, the project had been pushed back indefinitely. The new album was originally planned to be an EP, but the set-list increased to 15 songs by June 2014. The album was released on 30 October 2015 with a tour following.

=== Def Leppard, Diamond Star Halos and Drastic Symphonies (2015–2023) ===
In December 2014, the band announced a 13-date Canadian tour in April and May 2015. This was followed in February 2015 with the announcement of a 2015 US summer tour with Styx and Tesla from June to October 2015. The tour was then extended to include dates in Japan and Australia throughout November, and a tour of the UK and Ireland with Whitesnake in December. Def Leppard then returned to North America with REO Speedwagon and Tesla in early-2016.

The eleventh studio album, titled Def Leppard, was recorded in 2014 and 2015, and released on 30 October 2015. The band released the lead single from their self-titled album on 15 September 2015, titled "Let's Go", with a music video for the song being released on 30 October. The 14-track album debuted at number 10 in the US and number 11 in the UK.

During the break following their 2015 tour, Def Leppard led the Hysteria on the High Seas concert cruise aboard the MSC Divina in January 2016. Joe Elliott became ill with laryngitis on the night of their cruise performance. This led to the band performing without Elliott for the first time in their history. Vivian Campbell and Phil Collen sang lead vocals on two songs of the shortened seven song set in addition to two songs with vocals by Andrew Freeman and two more with Eric Martin and Kip Winger. in addition to this, Campbell and Freeman's Last in Line bandmate Jimmy Bain, former bassist of Dio died of lung cancer aboard the ship the same night, causing Last in Line to cancel their show the following day. Back on land, Elliott struggled through the first concert of the 2016 tour, resulting in Tesla's Jeff Keith joining Elliott on lead vocals. The following day's concert was also postponed "due to illness", with Rick Allen stating on Twitter "The Doctor basically said that if Joe continues to sing without resting his throat for a month he might do permanent damage." By July 2016, the band were performing regularly again and intended to complete 48 dates. When the tour stopped at DTE Energy Music Theatre in Clarkston, Michigan, on 15 July, the show was recorded for future release. On 10 February 2017, the band released And There Will be a Next Time ... Live from Detroit, a double live album and concert video. In August 2017, the band celebrated the 30th anniversary of Hysteria by releasing a collector's edition box. The singles were also re-released on vinyl.

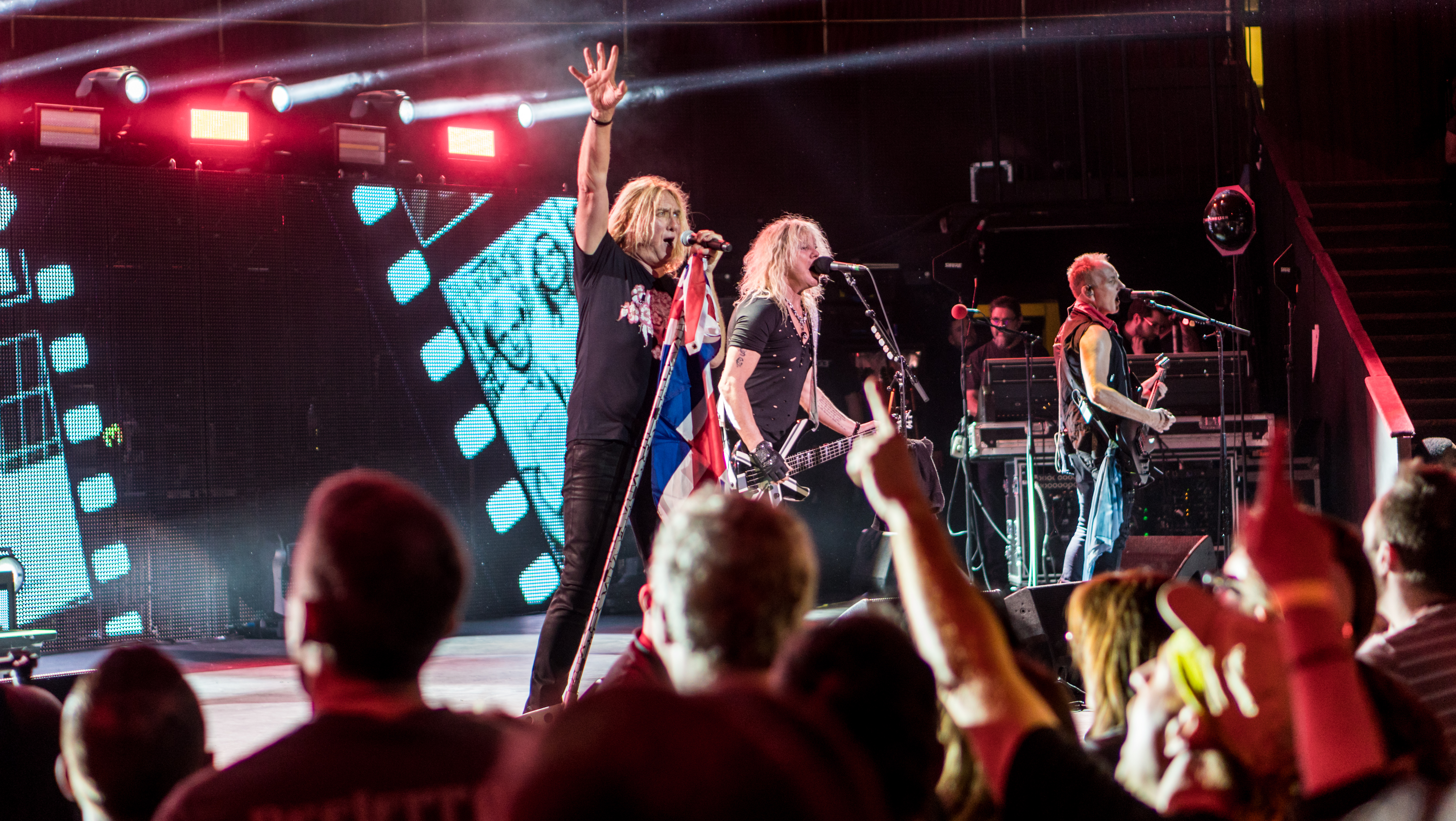
Def Leppard performing at a charity concert for the Teenage Cancer Trust held at the Royal Albert Hall in 2018.

In January 2018, Def Leppard announced they would embark on a 58-date North American tour with Journey. The tour included ten dates in baseball stadiums, a first for the band, with special guests Cheap Trick. The tour was highly successful, as the bands played in front of more than a million fans in North America in just three months, marking the tour out as one of the most successful in 2018. In addition, the group's discography was made available for streaming and digital download after a deal was reached between the band and Universal Music Group.

On 30 November 2018, the band released a new two-disc best of compilation, The Story So Far – The Best Of. In addition to 34 of Def Leppard's greatest hits, the collection featured the band's new cover of the Depeche Mode hit "Personal Jesus" (which was originally released in July 2018 for Spotify Singles), the new Christmas track "We All Need Christmas", and the new remix of "Rock On". On the same day, a new limited edition, 10-disc vinyl box set featuring all of the 7" singles from the Hysteria album was released. The band finished the year off with a sell-out tour of the UK and Ireland titled Hysteria & More Tour. They embarked on a world tour in 2019 beginning with the Sweden Rock Festival on 6 June. In March 2019, it was announced that the band would undertake a second Las Vegas residency titled Def Leppard Hits Vegas—The Sin City Residency. The box set The Early Years 79-81 was released in March 2020, featuring remastered versions of the band's first two albums plus a variety of live recordings, B-sides, and studio outtakes from the 1979 to 1981 period.

On 4 December 2019, the band announced they would be touring with Mötley Crüe, Poison, and Joan Jett on The Stadium Tour in summer 2020, which was later rescheduled to 2021, and then to 2022 due to the COVID-19 pandemic.

On 15 March 2022, Def Leppard announced their twelfth studio album, Diamond Star Halos. The album is named after a lyric in the Marc Bolan-penned T. Rex song "Get It On". On 17 March, the band released the lead single, "Kick". The album released on 27 May, received generally positive reviews, reaching Number 10 on the US Billboard 200 and Number 5 in the UK (it also charted in the top 10 in many other territories). 'Diamond Star Halos' is the band's highest-charting album since 1992's Adrenalize. It was supported by a worldwide Stadium Tour with Mötley Crüe seeing the band headline Wembley Stadium in London for the first time.

In January 2023, Joe Elliot was featured on a new version of Ghost's single Spillways released as Ghost and Def Leppard.

On 16 March 2023, a teaser video was uploaded to the official Def Leppard YouTube channel, announcing an album titled Drastic Symphonies. The album was released on 19 May and featured 16 tracks from previous albums reworked, stripped, or re-recorded. All tracks feature newly composed orchestra combined with most of the original vocals, performed by the Royal Philharmonic Orchestra. The album reached number 4 on the UK album chart, making this their highest chart position in the UK since 1995's Vault: Def Leppard Greatest Hits (1980–1995).

=== Upcoming thirteenth studio album (2024–present) ===
On 13 June 2024, Def Leppard released its first song in two years, "Just Like 73", featuring a guest guitar solo by Tom Morello. When asked that same month on SiriusXM's Trunk Nation With Eddie Trunk if it is a one-off single or the seed of the band's next album, guitarist Phil Collen said, "Oh, it's absolutely the seed of another Def Leppard record. I mean, it was a leftover from the album before, but it was also the start of a new album. So, without a doubt. [Joe and I] write all the time. We send each other things. Sav gets in on there. Just between the three of us, there's just a lot of stuff floating around already. So we've, yeah, got a bunch of stuff. It's really exciting. And it's a great place to be. It's never that thing where, 'Well, we've got to sit down and write an album.' It's, like, 'Wow, I can't wait to play this to the guys and see what the reaction is.' And we keep pushing the boat out even further." He also mentioned a possible 2025 or 2026 release date for the new album, "You know how these things go. We have these tours and everything, but we've got a new song. So that's really exciting. So that'll be on the go pretty soon."

On 22 January 2026, the band released new single "Rejoice". It is the lead single of the band's thirteenth studio album, which was set for release in early 2027; Collen later stated, however, that it may not be released until 2028.

On 8 October 2026, Def Leppard announced an extensive 45-date North American tour, commencing 2 March 2027 and running through 2 July 2027. Goo Goo Dolls and The Struts have been announced as the tour's supporting acts.

== Musical style and influences ==
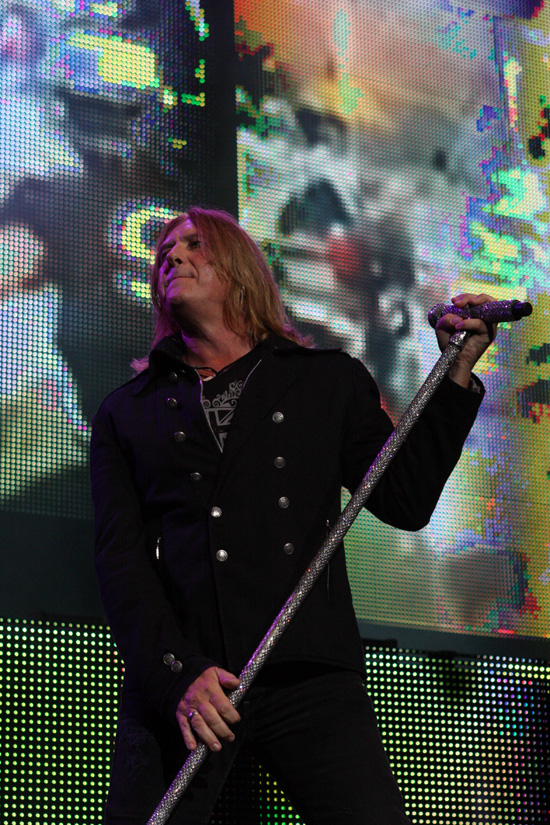
Joe Elliott is known for his distinctive raspy singing voice.

Def Leppard has a "catchy" and "guitar-driven" musical style, described as hard rock, glam metal, pop metal, arena rock, and power pop, while their early work has been characterized as heavy metal. The band's music combines hard rock, AOR, pop and heavy metal elements, with its multi-layered, harmonic vocals and its melodic guitar riffs. In addition, making a concession to popular tastes of its time, Slang featured a sparser sound and alternative rock feel. Though they were often considered one of the top bands of the new wave of British heavy metal movement of the late 1970s, the band disliked the branding, stating: "We didn't agree that our music was anything like Iron Maiden's." The band's music also contains sentimental ballads. Lyrical themes explored by the band include sexual intercourse.

In the mid-1980s, the band were associated with the growing glam metal scene, mainly due to their mainstream success and glossy production. Pyromania has been cited as the catalyst for the 1980s pop-metal movement. Def Leppard, however, expressed their dislike of the "glam metal" label as well, as they thought it did not accurately describe their look or musical style. By the release of the Hysteria album, the band had developed a distinctive sound featuring electronic drums and effects-laden guitar sounds overlaid with a multi-layered wall of husky, harmonised vocals. According to Joe Elliott, the band is influenced by "everything from pure pop to downright hardcore rock". He has cited Ian Hunter and Mott the Hoople among the band's early influences. Def Leppard themselves have been cited as an influence by a wide range of musical artists, including Matt Nathanson, and Taylor Swift.

== Legacy ==
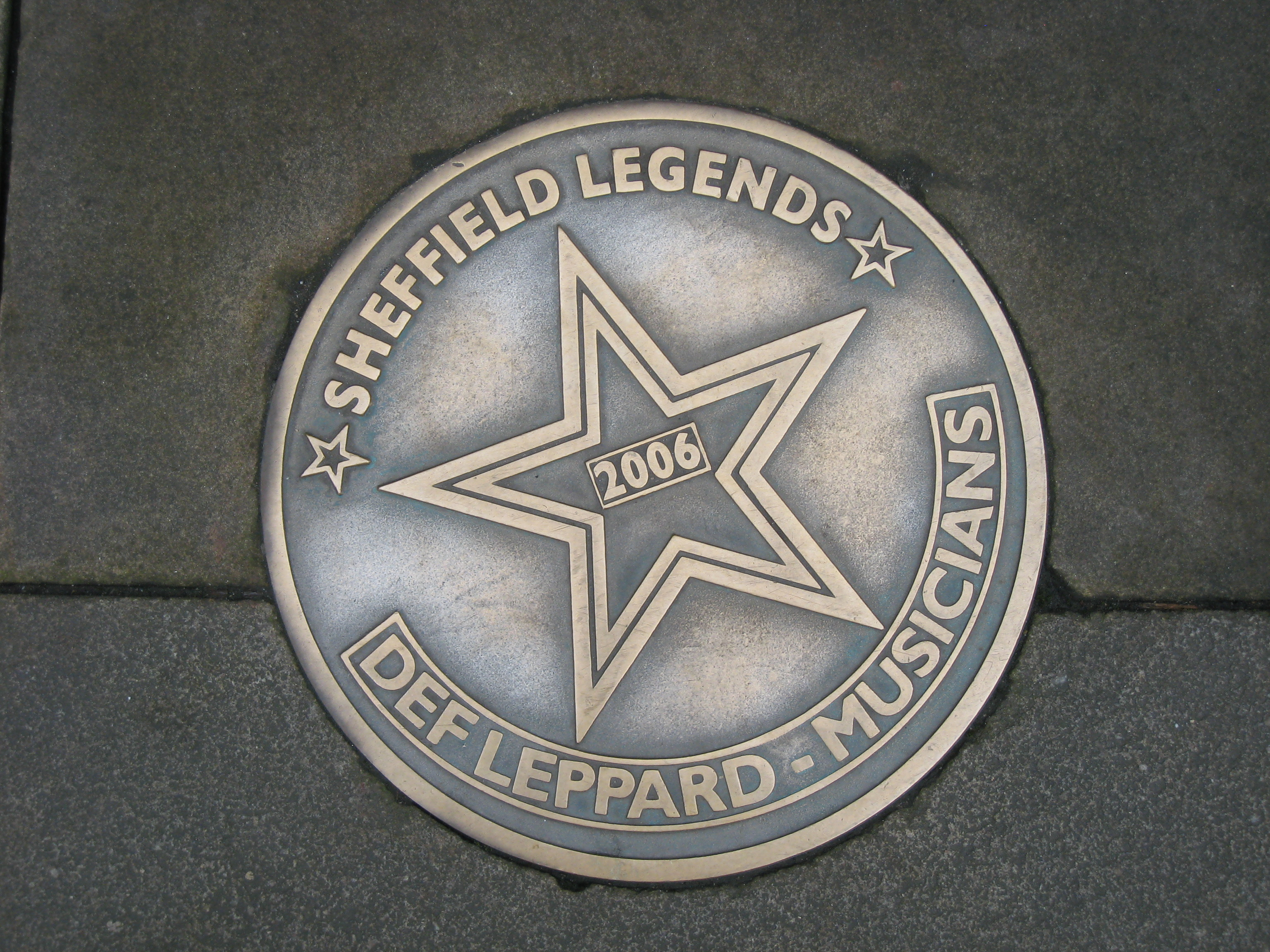
Sheffield Legends plaque in their home city of Sheffield, England, installed in 2006.

With Pyromania and Hysteria both certified Diamond by the RIAA, Def Leppard are one of only five rock bands with two original studio albums selling over 10 million copies each in the US, alongside the Beatles, Led Zeppelin, Pink Floyd, and Van Halen. Both Pyromania and Hysteria feature in Rolling Stone's list of the 500 Greatest Albums of All Time.

Def Leppard were among the most successful of the new wave of British heavy metal bands in the early 1980s. They combined the raw power of metal with a pop emphasis on melody, catchy hooks and vocal harmonies that, particularly later on, contrasted sharply with harsher contemporary metal and punk bands. Their early album On Through the Night (1980) appealed to metal fans like of Dimebag Darrell of Pantera and Jeff Hanneman of Slayer. Their hugely popular later albums, such as Hysteria (1987), were different due to their perfectionism in the studio, but appealed to a broad range of music fans.

In 2006, the band received a Sheffield Legends plaque in their hometown of Sheffield. Despite their huge commercial success, Elliott has said in an interview that he feels the band does not receive its fair share of respect from the British music press and he said the band had been barred from the BBC's Later with Jools Holland series because they were "not cool enough".

In 2025, Ultimate Classic Rock said Def Leppard were among the "Big Four" of glam metal, along with Mötley Crüe, Bon Jovi and Poison. The following year, Loudwire said they were one of the "Big Four" bands of '80s rock, along with Van Halen, Guns N' Roses and Motley Crue.

=== Rock and Roll Hall of Fame induction ===
Not everybody realises that these guys are not just crowd pleasers. They also embody such an amazing technical excellence. They have it all. I regard all these guys as great friends and kind of part of my family, that's why it's so important for me to be here. I wouldn't have let anybody else do this.

— Brian May, inducting Def Leppard into the Rock and Roll Hall of Fame.

On 9 October 2018, Def Leppard received an induction nomination from the Rock and Roll Hall of Fame. In addition to the 1,000 members of the Hall of Fame voting committee, the general public also had an opportunity to participate in the "Fan Vote". On 13 December 2018, Def Leppard were named in the Rock and Roll Hall of Fame's Class of 2019. The band won the Klipsch Audio Fan Vote, beating 14 other nominees with 547,647 general public votes (119,803 and 28% more than second vote receiver Stevie Nicks).

The current line-up of the band, along with past members Pete Willis and Steve Clark, were inducted into the Rock and Roll Hall of Fame on 29 March 2019 at a ceremony at Brooklyn's Barclays Center. Def Leppard were inducted by Queen guitarist Brian May, who said they were "a magnificent rock group, in the classic tradition of what a rock group really is" and "a bunch of magnificent human beings".

== Band members ==
Current members

- Joe Elliott – lead vocals, keyboards, piano, occasional guitar (1976–present)
- Rick Savage – bass, keyboards, backing vocals, occasional guitar (1976–present)
- Rick Allen – drums, percussion, backing vocals (1978–present)
- Phil Collen – guitar, backing vocals (1982–present)
- Vivian Campbell – guitar, backing vocals (1992–present)

== Side projects ==
Phil Collen played guitar, uncredited, on Sam Kinison's "Wild Thing" in 1988. The video featured members of bands such as Poison, Bon Jovi, Mötley Crüe, Guns N' Roses, Ratt, and Aerosmith. Collen also produced and played on the 1991 album On the Edge by Australian band BB Steal.

Joe Elliott sang lead vocals on two tracks on Rolling Stones guitarist Ronnie Wood's 1992 solo album, Slide on This. His then-wife Karla appeared in the videos for "Always Wanted More" and "Somebody Else Might". Various members of Def Leppard have played on tribute records for Jeff Beck, AC/DC, and Alice Cooper.

A fan of his local football club Sheffield United F.C., Elliott performed on two tracks to the soundtrack of the 1996 Sheffield-set motion picture, When Saturday Comes (featuring fellow Sheffield native Sean Bean as a star football player), the title track and an instrumental, "Jimmy's Theme". Elliott sang and co-wrote the opening track, "Don't Look Down" on Mick Ronson's farewell album Heaven and Hull. A promotional video was issued for the song as well.

Cybernauts was a side project consisting of Elliott and Collen teamed with members of The Spiders From Mars (David Bowie's former band), minus the late Mick Ronson. The group played several shows, covering Bowie's Ziggy Stardust-era songs and released one internet-only album (since deleted).

Vivian Campbell has played with two side bands in recent years, Clock and the Riverdogs, and recorded a solo album, Two Sides of If, released in 2005. Campbell toured with Thin Lizzy in early 2011 before joining Def Leppard on their Mirrorball tour.

Collen sings lead vocals and plays guitar in a side band called Man Raze with Sex Pistols drummer Paul Cook and former Girl bandmate Simon Laffy. They released their debut album Surreal in 2008 and a second album, PunkFunkRootsRock, in 2011.

Joe Elliott founded and fronts the band Down 'n' Outz with members of The Quireboys. The band plays covers of Mott the Hoople and related artists such as British Lions and Ian Hunter. They have released two studio albums of covers, one of original material and one live album since their incarnation in 2009.

Following the death of Ronnie James Dio, Vivian Campbell reunited with the rest of the original Dio line-up with vocalist Andrew Freeman to form Last in Line. The band pays tribute to Dio by playing songs from their original tenure in the band and released an album titled Heavy Crown in February 2016.

Joe Elliott, along with various other musicians including Glenn Hughes, Duff McKagan, Sebastian Bach, Matt Sorum, Gilby Clarke and Steve Stevens formed a supergroup called Kings of Chaos, whose catalogue consists of songs by Deep Purple, Def Leppard, Guns N' Roses and others. In 2012, Kings of Chaos recorded their version of Deep Purple's classic, "Never Before" featuring Elliott singing lead vocals. Kings of Chaos played Stone Fest in Australia along with a few dates in South America in 2013.

Phil Collen formed a blues project by the name of Delta Deep with vocalist Debbi Blackwell Cook which released an eponymous debut in 2015.

In October 2020, Joe Elliott and Phil Collen played on the Struts song, "I Hate How Much I Want You", part of their Strange Days album.

In June 2020, Joe Elliot sang on Ghost's "Spillways" song.

== Awards and nominations ==
Def Leppard won two awards at the 1989 American Music Awards for favourite Heavy Metal/Hard Rock Artist and album for Hysteria.

On 7 October 2025, the band received a star on Hollywood Walk of Fame.

== Discography ==
Studio albums

- On Through the Night (1980)
- High 'n' Dry (1981)
- Pyromania (1983)
- Hysteria (1987)
- Adrenalize (1992)
- Slang (1996)
- Euphoria (1999)
- X (2002)
- Yeah! (2006)
- Songs from the Sparkle Lounge (2008)
- Def Leppard (2015)
- Diamond Star Halos (2022)

== See also ==
- List of artists who reached number one in the United States
- List of artists who reached number one on the U.S. Mainstream Rock chart
- List of best-selling music artists
- List of glam metal bands and artists
- List of new wave of British heavy metal bands
