= Surreal (album) =

Studio album by Man Raze
- Released: June 3, 2008
- Recorded: 2006
- Genre: Rock, Alternative & Dub
- Length: 40:00
- Label: Surrealist Records/VH1 Classic Records
- Producer: Man Raze/Ger McDonnell

Man Raze chronology
Surreal (2008)	PunkFunkRootsRock (2011)

Professional ratings
Review scores
Source	Rating
Allmusic	link
BringBackGlam	link
TheCelebrityCafe	link
Metromix	link
Rocknrolluniverse	link
Thrash Hits	link

Surreal is the debut album from UK alternative rock band Man Raze. The album was written over a two-year period from 2004 to 2006 and recorded during April 2006 in Dublin in only two weeks. It features the singles "Skin Crawl" and "Turn It Up". The album was released in the United States on June 3, 2008. The UK Edition featuring a 5 track bonus disc is available from December 1, 2008.

== Track listing ==
1. "This Is" – 2:33
2. "Turn It Up" – 2:12
3. "Runnin' Me Up" – 4:06
4. "Every Second Of Every Day" – 4:00
5. "Spinning Out" – 3:22
6. "Can't Find My Own Way" – 3:11
7. "Skin Crawl" – 3:53
8. "Low" – 3:49
9. "Connected To You" – 2:39
10. "Halo" – 2:57
11. "It's Entertainment" – 2:33
12. "Shadow Man" – 4:16
13. "Turn It Up (Dub)" – 5:06 (US iTunes Bonus Track)

== UK/European Bonus Disc ==
1. "You're So Wrong"
2. "Low (Live In Burbank '08)"
3. "Turn It Up (Deep Dub)"
4. "Runnin' Me Up (Instrumental Dub)"
5. "Can't Find My Own Way (Live Acoustic)"

== Personnel ==
- Phil Collen: Lead Vocals, Guitar, Background Vocals
- Simon Laffy: Bass Guitar, Background Vocals
- Paul Cook: Drums, Background Vocals

== Production credits ==
- Phil Collen: Engineer
- Simon Laffy: Programming, Engineer
- Bob Ludwig: Mastering
- Ger McDonnell: Producer, Engineer
- Laurence Brazil: Engineer
- Richard Proctor: Artwork
- Shannon Toumey: Packaging Manager
