= PunkFunkRootsRock =

Studio album by Man Raze
- Released: 2011
- Genre: Hard rock
- Label: Rocket Science Ventures

Man Raze chronology
Surreal (2008)	PunkFunkRootsRock (2011)

PunkFunkRootsRock is the second album by the band Man Raze. A music video for "Fire" was released.

== Track listing ==
No.	Title	Length
1.	"Over My Dead Body"	3:25
2.	"I C U In Everything"	3:01
3.	"All I Wanna Do"	3:48
4.	"Closer to Me"	3:56
5.	"Lies Lies All Lies"	2:47
6.	"Get Action"	3:03
7.	"Edge of the World"	3:47
8.	"Dreamland"	3:46
9.	"Fire"	3:18
10.	"I, Superbiker"	3:00
11.	"Bittersweet"	4:08
12.	"Dog Bite"	4:08
Total length:		42:07

== Personnel ==
- Phil Collen – guitar, vocals
- Simon Laffy – bass
- Paul Cook – drums
- Kadota Combs – producing
