= Soul Shine Magazine =

Online music magazine

Soul Shine Magazine is a Canadian online music magazine covering independent and mainstream artists from a variety of genres and backgrounds.

== History and profile ==
Soul Shine Magazine was founded in 2002. The magazine is based in Toronto, Ontario.

Lindsay and Paul Whitfield are the magazine's creative team, providing coverage of independent and mainstream artists, daily music news, interviews, gig and album reviews, gig listings, games, contests, and Soul Shine's indie radio.
