= Man Raze =

English alternative rock band

Manraze
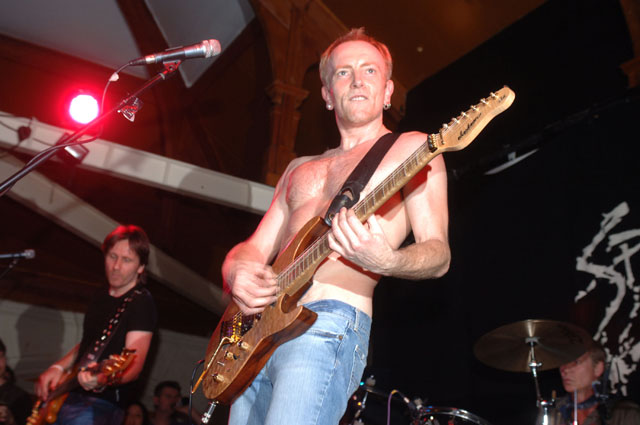
- Man Raze performing in 2005

Background information
- Origin: Finchley, London, England
- Genres: Alternative rock, post-grunge, hard rock
- Years active: 2004–present
- Labels: Surrealist, VH1 Classic, Rocket Science Ventures
- Members: Phil Collen; Simon Laffy; Paul Cook
- Website: www.manraze.com

Man Raze are an English three-piece alternative rock band originally from Finchley, London, England formed in 2004, featuring Phil Collen, Simon Laffy and Paul Cook.

== History ==
Man Raze played a sold-out show at the Spitz club near Old Spitalfields Market in London, England, on 27 September 2005. Man Raze then released their first single called "Skin Crawl" as a maxi-single CD on 31 October 2005 in the UK. The single was released on their own label, Surrealist Records, and reached number 9 on the UK Top 40 Rock Singles Chart.

=== New website and digital download (2007) ===
In June 2007 the band re-launched their official website and added a new digital store. At this time they also released their second single. "Turn It Up", which was part of a digital bundle that also featured album track 'Connected To You' plus a newly recorded version of 'You're So Wrong'. The promo video for 'Turn It Up' was also included, the band's first video. Shot in black and white in a rehearsal studio. The song "Turn It Up" was featured on ESPN (American Sports Channel) College Football coverage. The album was due for release in September 2007 and then delayed to January 2008, due to external commitments of band members.

In June 2007, Man Raze made their first TV appearance on the UK channel Rockworld TV Performing three acoustic songs and being interviewed by Gary Crowley on his Gary Crowley Presents... show. The show was later re-broadcast and titled "Man Raze In Session".

=== Second live show and documentary (2008) ===
In March 2008, the band came together in California to rehearse and to film a documentary. Footage was shot for broadcast on TV and as bonus footage for the album release. On 19 March the band played their second live show at a rehearsal studio in Los Angeles. 15 members of the official online Man Raze Street Team won the chance to be there and meet the band. The band played nine songs, including three for the very first time. VH1 Classic in the US are set to broadcast footage from the show in June 2008.

=== Debut album release (2008) ===
The debut album Surreal was released in the USA on the VH1 Classic label on 3 June 2008. The album contains 12 tracks and the band aim to play live shows in between other band commitments. The song 'Turn It Up' was released to radio in the USA during May and a 30-second advert for the album was added to the VH1 Classic channel.

Surreal was released online on 14 May 2008 featuring a bonus Dub version of 'Turn It Up' and its video.

The band launched an official video channel on YouTube in May 2008. It features videos approved only by the band including live footage and interviews. During June 2008, 12 video clips were added to the channel previewing the documentary 'Man Raze The Film' which is due to be shown on TV later in the year.

=== UK album release/UK Tour (2008) ===
The debut album Surreal was released in the UK on 1 December 2008. It included a 5-track European bonus disc.

To support the release of the album in their homeland the band embarked on their first ever tour, playing four dates around the UK: 3 December at Manchester, 4 December at Birmingham, and 8–9 December at London.

=== UK Tour with Alice Cooper (2009) ===
Man Raze were the intended for support for Def Leppard on their 2009 North American but the tour was cancelled. The band were invited to support Alice Cooper on all of his UK dates in late November/early December 2009.

== Band members ==
- Phil Collen - guitar, lead vocals (2004–present)
- Simon Laffy - bass guitar, backing vocals (2004–present)
- Paul Cook - drums (2004–present)

== Discography ==
=== Albums ===
- Surreal - (USA June 2008/UK December 2008)
- PunkFunkRootsRock (2011)

=== Singles ===
- "Skin Crawl" CD Maxi Single - (October 2005) UK Top 40 Rock Singles No. 9
- "Turn It Up" Digital Download - (June 2007)

=== Compilations/box sets ===
- "Lock, Stock & Barrel (Complete Recordings 2008-2011)" - (May 2026)
