= Rock of Ages: The DVD Collection =

Video by Def Leppard
- Released: November 15, 2005
- Recorded: 1982–2005
- Genre: Rock
- Length: 146 minutes approx.
- Label: Island Records

Def Leppard video chronology
Best of the Videos (2004)	Rock of Ages: The DVD Collection (2005)	Viva! Hysteria (2013)

Rock of Ages: The DVD Collection is a DVD featuring music videos by Def Leppard. This one-disc collection contains a total of 19 commercial single videos that helped jump the band to success after the release of their breakthrough 1983 album, Pyromania. Only one video featured on the compilation, "Bringin' On the Heartbreak", was not released after Pyromania.

This DVD collection was released alongside its own compilation CD album Rock of Ages: The Definitive Collection, which included various songs that were not released as singles and singles that did not have music videos made for them.

== Track listing ==
DVD
No.	Title	Writer(s)	Origin	Length
1.	"Pour Some Sugar on Me"	Steve Clark; Phil Collen; Joe Elliott; Robert John "Mutt" Lange; Rick Savage	Hysteria (1987)
2.	"Photograph"	Clark; Elliott; Lange; Savage; Pete Willis	Pyromania (1983)
3.	"Love Bites"	Clark; Collen; Elliott; Lange; Savage	Hysteria
4.	"Let's Get Rocked"	Collen; Elliott; Lange; Savage	Adrenalize (1992)
5.	"Two Steps Behind"	Elliott	Last Action Hero soundtrack (1993)
6.	"Animal"	Clark; Collen; Elliott; Lange; Savage	Hysteria
7.	"Foolin'"	Clark; Elliott; Lange	Pyromania
8.	"Rocket"	Clark; Collen; Elliott; Lange; Savage	Hysteria
9.	"When Love & Hate Collide"	Elliott; Savage	Vault: Def Leppard Greatest Hits (1980–1995) (1995)
10.	"Armageddon It"	Clark; Collen; Elliott; Lange; Savage	Hysteria
11.	"Have You Ever Needed Someone So Bad"	Collen; Elliott; Lange	Adrenalize
12.	"Rock of Ages"	Clark; Elliott; Lange	Pyromania
13.	"Hysteria"	Clark; Collen; Elliott; Lange; Savage	Hysteria
14.	"Bringin' On the Heartbreak"	Clark; Elliott; Willis	High 'n' Dry (1981)
15.	"Promises"	Collen; Lange	Euphoria (1999)
16.	"Women"	Clark; Collen; Elliott; Lange; Savage	Hysteria
17.	"Slang"	Collen; Elliott	Slang (1996)
18.	"Work It Out"	Vivian Campbell	Slang
19.	"Now"	Rick Allen; Campbell; Collen; Elliott; Marti Frederiksen; Savage	X (2002)

Note: *The video for "Bringin' On the Heartbreak" is the Phil Collen version (taped in 1984), however, the audio is the original Pete Willis version (1981). This may have been done on purpose for the Greatest Hits collection to merge the more popular version of the song with the more well-known music video.

== Extra features ==
- "No Matter What" (Rehearsal video)
- Track-by-track commentary by the entire band
- Personal playlist option

== Certifications ==
Region	Certification	Certified units/sales
United States (RIAA)	Gold	50,000^{^}
^{^} Shipments figures based on certification alone.
