= List of UK Rock & Metal Singles Chart number ones of 1996 =

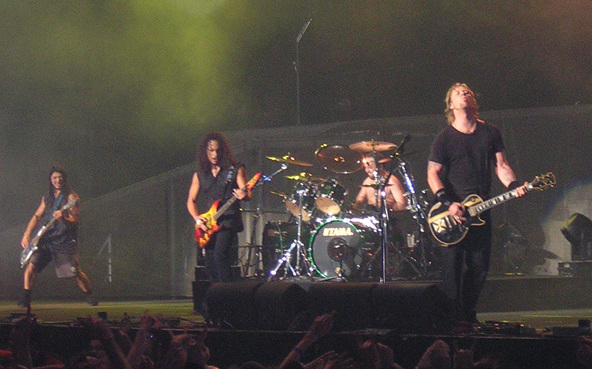
"Hero of the Day" by Metallica was the joint longest-running number-one single of 1996, spending five weeks atop the chart. The band also reached number one with "Until It Sleeps" and "Mama Said".

The UK Rock & Metal Singles Chart is a record chart which ranks the best-selling rock and heavy metal songs in the United Kingdom. Compiled and published by the Official Charts Company, the data is based on each track's weekly physical sales, digital downloads and streams. In 1996, there were 30 singles that topped the 52 published charts. The first number-one single of the year was "When Love & Hate Collide", the only single from the Def Leppard compilation Vault: Def Leppard Greatest Hits (1980–1995). The final number-one single of the year was "In the Meantime", the debut single by alternative rock band Spacehog.

The most successful songs on the UK Rock & Metal Singles Chart in 1996 were "Hero of the Day" by Metallica and "Let's Make a Night to Remember" by Bryan Adams, both of which spent five weeks atop the chart. Metallica also spent two weeks at number one with "Until It Sleeps" and one with "Mama Said", while Adams also topped the chart with "The Only Thing That Looks Good on Me Is You". Sepultura spent five weeks at number one with three songs; Def Leppard spent four weeks at number one with four songs; and Bon Jovi spent four weeks at number one with two songs. Songs by Dog Eat Dog, Sex Pistols and The Presidents of the United States of America each spent three weeks at number one; while Whale, Rage Against the Machine, Terrorvision and Soundgarden all spent two weeks atop the chart.

== Chart history ==
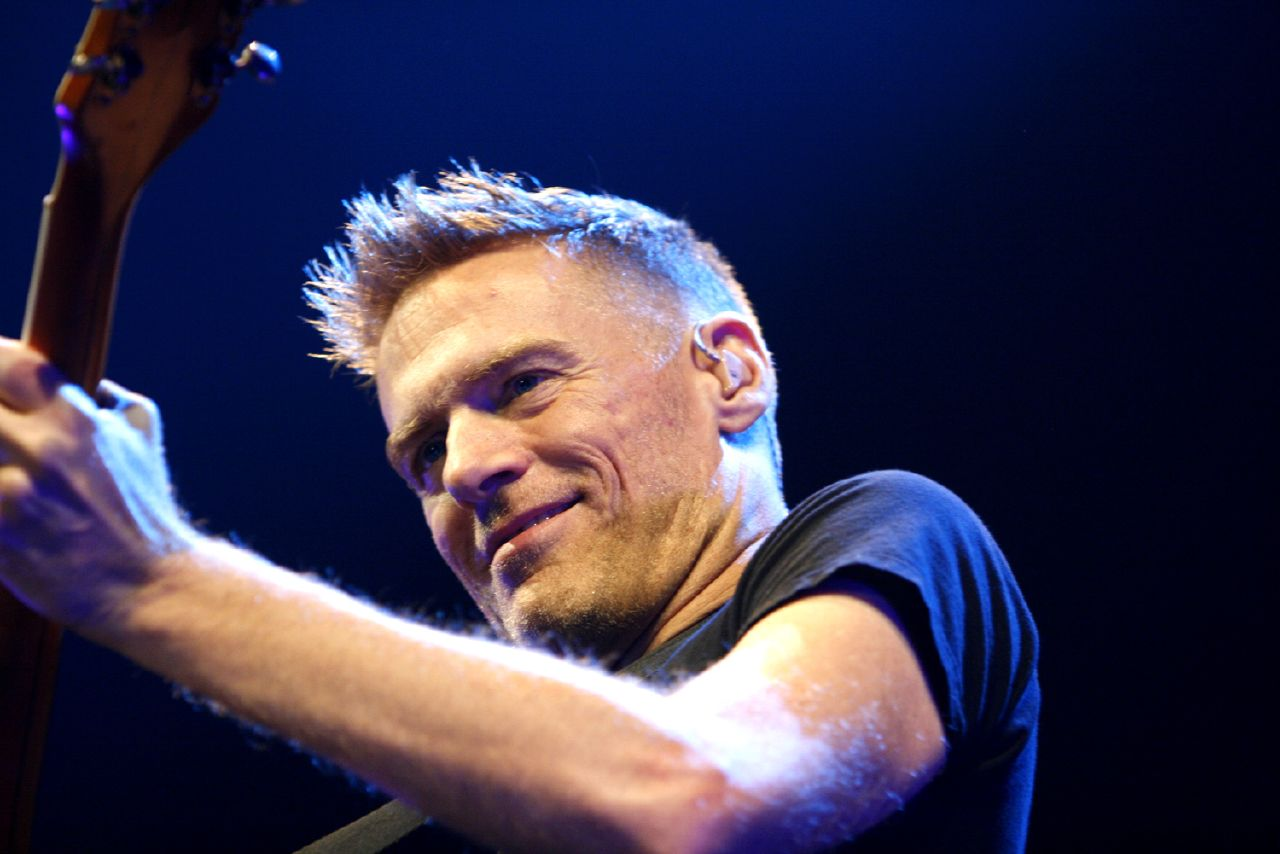
Bryan Adams spent five weeks at number one with "Let's Make a Night to Remember" and one with "The Only Thing That Looks Good on Me Is You".

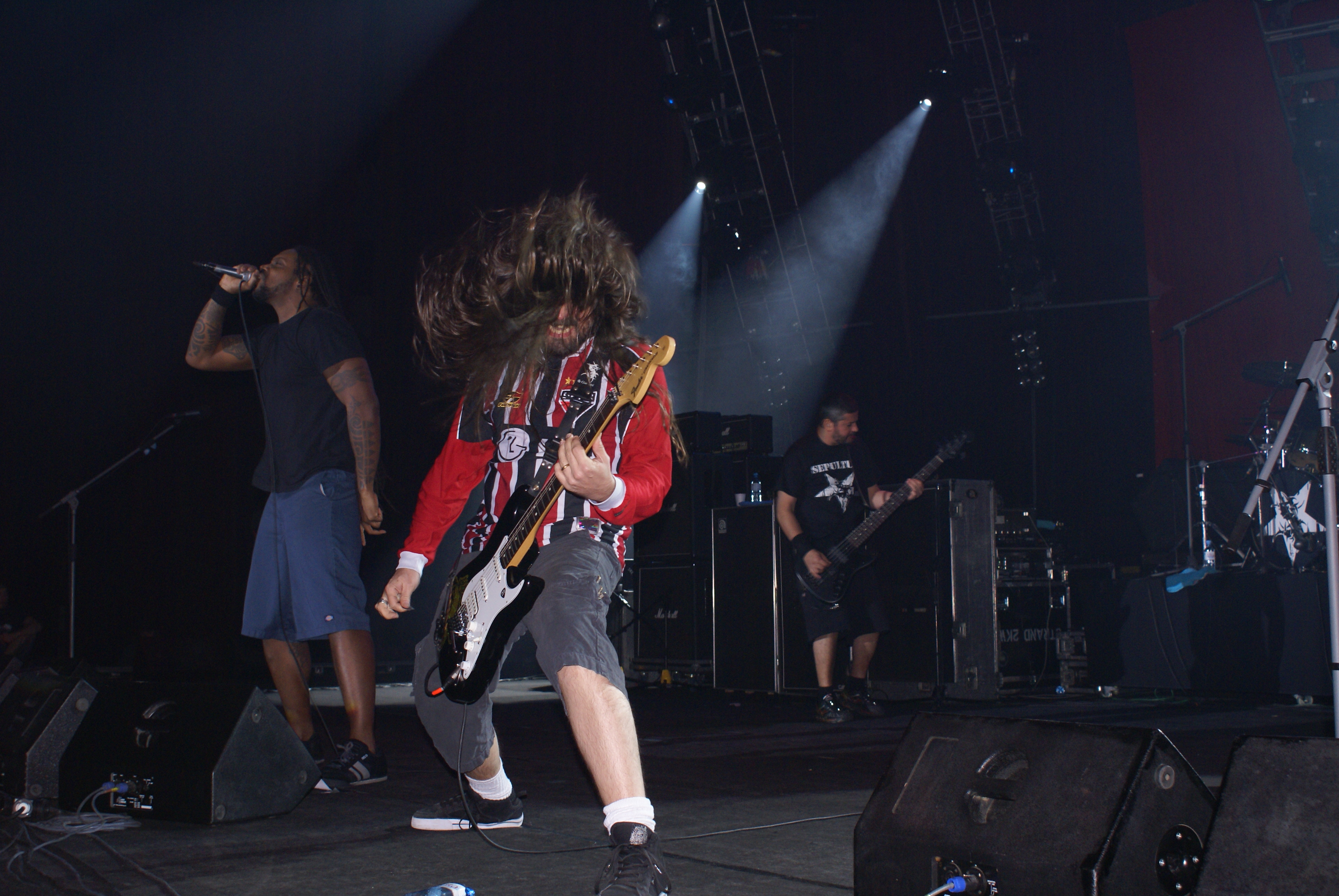
Sepultura spent five weeks at number one in 1996, with "Roots Bloody Roots", "Attitude" (two weeks each) and "Ratamahatta" all topping the chart.

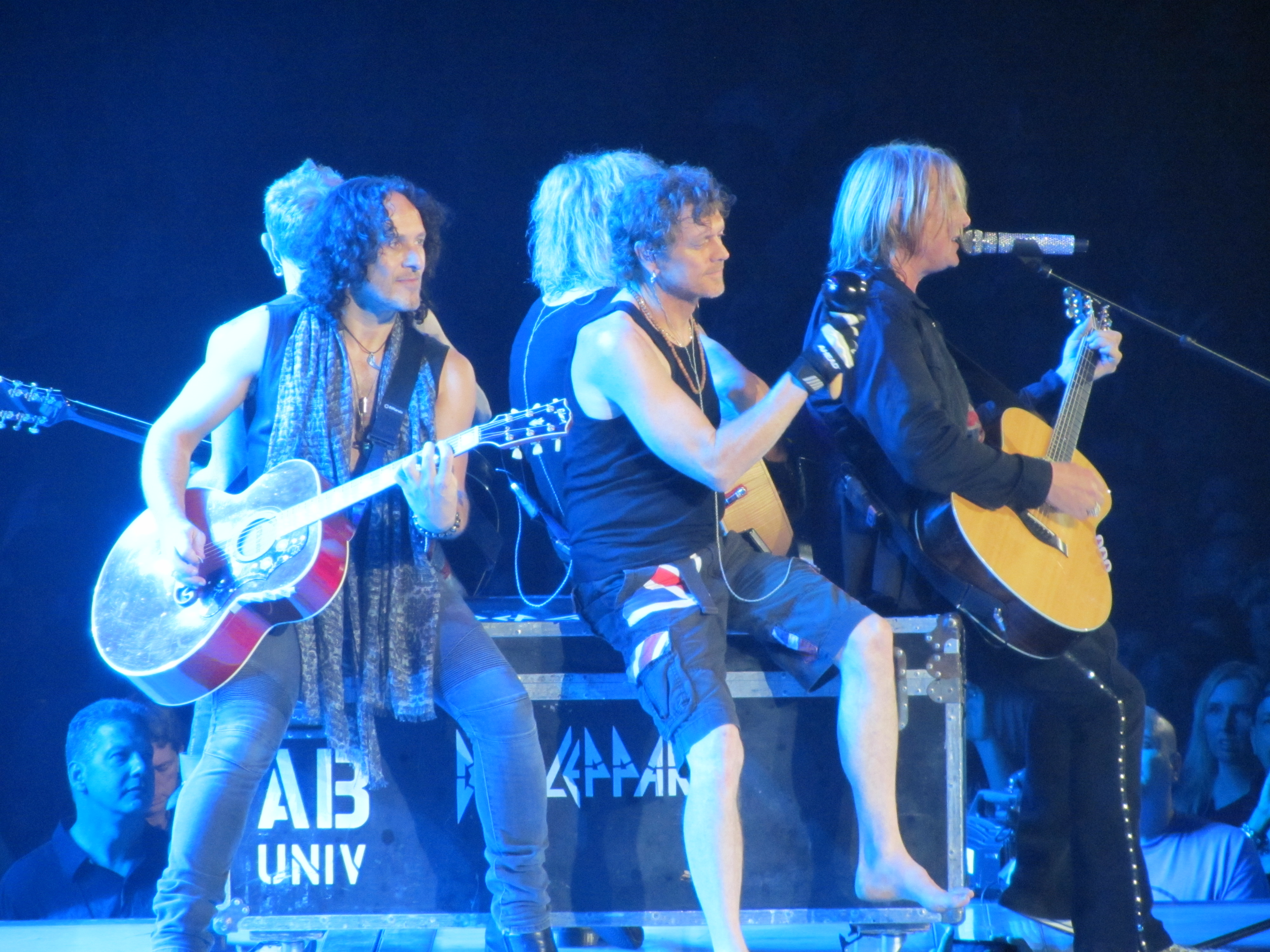
Four Def Leppard songs – "When Love & Hate Collide", "Slang", "Work It Out" and "Breathe a Sigh" – topped the UK Rock & Metal Singles Chart in 1996.

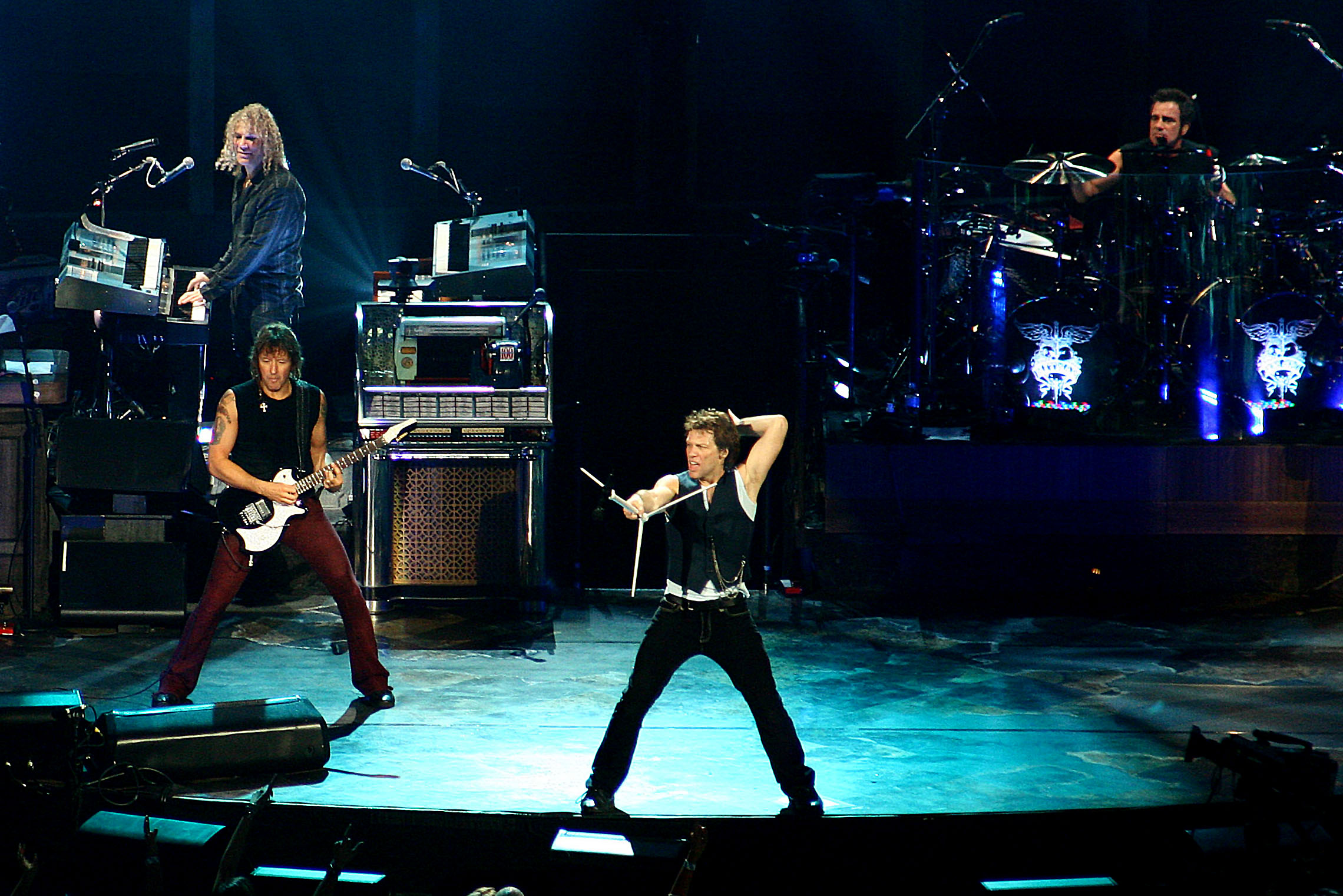
Bon Jovi spent four weeks at number one during 1996 with "These Days" (for three weeks) and "Hey God".

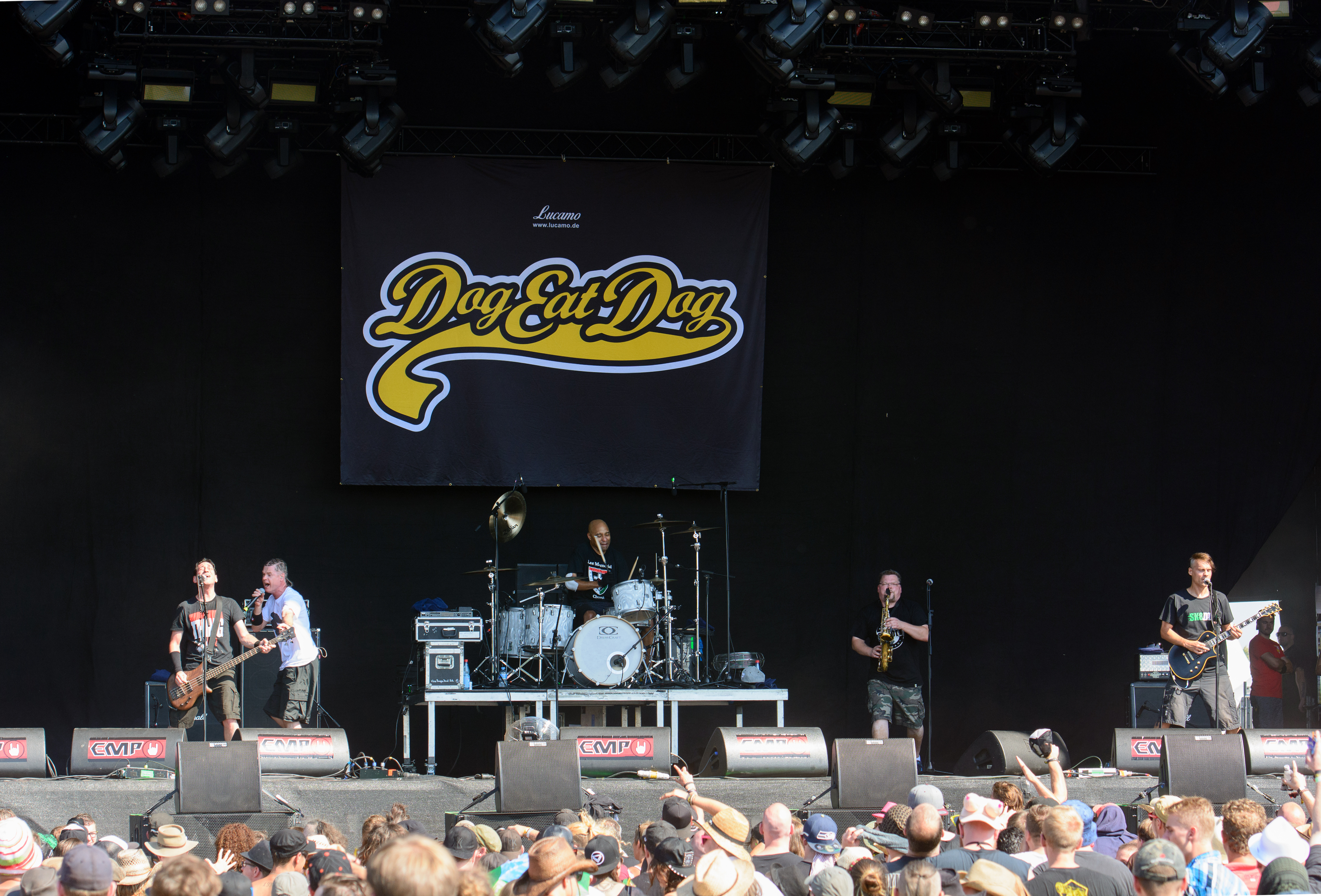
Dog Eat Dog topped the chart with "No Fronts" for three weeks in 1996.

Issue date	Single	Artist(s)	Record label(s)	Ref.
6 January	"When Love & Hate Collide"	Def Leppard	Bludgeon Riffola	
13 January	"Hobo Humpin' Slobo Babe"	Whale	Hut	
20 January	"Hobo Humpin' Slobo Babe"	Whale	Hut	
27 January	"Stuck with Me"	Green Day	Reprise	
3 February	"No Fronts"	Dog Eat Dog	Roadrunner	
10 February	"No Fronts"	Dog Eat Dog	Roadrunner	
17 February	"No Fronts"	Dog Eat Dog	Roadrunner	
24 February	"Roots Bloody Roots"	Sepultura	Roadrunner	
2 March	"Roots Bloody Roots"	Sepultura	Roadrunner	
9 March	"These Days"	Bon Jovi	Mercury	
16 March	"These Days"	Bon Jovi	Mercury	
23 March	"These Days"	Bon Jovi	Mercury	
30 March	"Stupid Girl"	Garbage	Mushroom	
6 April	"Big Me"	Foo Fighters	Roswell	
13 April	"Bulls on Parade"	Rage Against the Machine	Epic	
20 April	"Bulls on Parade"	Rage Against the Machine	Epic	
27 April	"Animal Army"	Babylon Zoo	EMI	
4 May	"Celebrity Hit List"	Terrorvision	Total Vegas	
11 May	"Slang"	Def Leppard	Bludgeon Riffola	
18 May	"Pretty Noose"	Soundgarden	A&M	
25 May	"Pretty Noose"	Soundgarden	A&M	
1 June	"Until It Sleeps"	Metallica	Vertigo	
8 June	"Until It Sleeps"	Metallica	Vertigo	
15 June	"The Only Thing That Looks Good on Me Is You"	Bryan Adams	A&M	
22 June	"Bis vs. the D.I.Y. Corps"	Bis	Teen-C	
29 June	"Let Me Live"	Queen	Parlophone	
6 July	"Hey God"	Bon Jovi	Mercury	
13 July	"Work It Out"	Def Leppard	Bludgeon Riffola	
20 July	"Bad Actress"	Terrorvision	Total Vegas	
27 July	"Pretty Vacant"	Sex Pistols	Virgin	
3 August	"Pretty Vacant"	Sex Pistols	Virgin	
10 August	"Pretty Vacant"	Sex Pistols	Virgin	
17 August	"Ratamahatta"	Sepultura	Roadrunner	
24 August	"Let's Make a Night to Remember"	Bryan Adams	A&M	
31 August	"Let's Make a Night to Remember"	Bryan Adams	A&M	
7 September	"Let's Make a Night to Remember"	Bryan Adams	A&M	
14 September	"Let's Make a Night to Remember"	Bryan Adams	A&M	
21 September	"Let's Make a Night to Remember"	Bryan Adams	A&M	
28 September	"Hero of the Day"	Metallica	Vertigo	
5 October	"Hero of the Day"	Metallica	Vertigo	
12 October	"Hero of the Day"	Metallica	Vertigo	
19 October	"Hero of the Day"	Metallica	Vertigo	
26 October	"Hero of the Day"	Metallica	Vertigo	
2 November	"Mach 5"	The Presidents of the United; States of America	Columbia	
9 November	"Mach 5"	The Presidents of the United; States of America	Columbia	
16 November	"Mach 5"	The Presidents of the United; States of America	Columbia	
23 November	"Thirty-Three"	The Smashing Pumpkins	Virgin	
30 November	"Breathe a Sigh"	Def Leppard	Bludgeon Riffola	
7 December	"Mama Said"	Metallica	Vertigo	
14 December	"Attitude"	Sepultura	Roadrunner	
21 December	"Attitude"	Sepultura	Roadrunner	
28 December	"In the Meantime"	Spacehog	Elektra	

== See also ==
- 1996 in British music
- List of UK Rock & Metal Albums Chart number ones of 1996
