= Adrenalize World Tour =

1992–93 concert tour by Def Leppard

Adrenalize "Seven Day Weekend" World Tour
- Tour by Def Leppard
- Adrenalize "Seven Day Weekend" World Tour Advertisement
- Location: Europe; North America; Oceania; Japan
- Associated album: Adrenalize
- Start date: 15 April 1992
- End date: 29 September 1993
- No. of shows: 244

Def Leppard concert chronology
- Hysteria World Tour (1987–1988); Adrenalize World Tour (1992–1993); Slang World Tour (1996–1997)

The Adrenalize World Tour – also known as the Adrenalize "Seven Day Weekend" Tour – was a concert tour by English hard rock band Def Leppard to support the Adrenalize album, released in March 1992. It was their first tour without guitarist Steve Clark, who died in January 1991 while the album was recorded. Former Dio and Whitesnake guitarist Vivian Campbell joined six weeks before the tour began.

The tour kicked off with a club show in Dublin, Ireland on April 15, 1992. Campbell's first public appearance with the band, it was a warm-up for The Freddie Mercury Tribute Concert on April 20 in London.

In 1992 and early 1993, the tour was performed in the round, with the stage surrounded by the audience; a format Leppard first used on the 1987/1988 Hysteria World Tour.

"We started the tour as a huge, long-haired, dressed-up, arena rock band," Campbell observed, "and we finished it looking like Pearl Jam: wearing ratty jeans, growing goatees and cutting our hair. During the course of that fifteen-month tour, the entire musical landscape changed."

== Opening acts ==
- GUN (Scotland)
- Ugly Kid Joe
- Thunder
- Terrorvision

== Set lists ==
Taken from 15 April 1992 show in Dublin, Ireland

1. "Stagefright"
2. "Rock! Rock! (Till You Drop)"
3. "Women"
4. "Too Late for Love"
5. "Hysteria"
6. "Gods of War"
7. "Die Hard the Hunter"
8. "Love Bites"
9. "Foolin'"
10. "Rock of Ages"
11. "Armageddon It"
12. "Pour Some Sugar on Me"
13. "Let's Get Rocked"
14. "Animal"
15. "Now I'm Here" (Queen cover)
16. "Photograph"
17. "Tear It Down"

Taken from 23 June 1992 show in Sheffield, England

1. "Stagefright"
2. "Tear It Down"
3. "Women"
4. "Too Late for Love"
5. "Hysteria" (mid-song power loss)
6. "Make Love Like a Man"
7. Phil Collen guitar solo
8. "White Lightning"
9. "Foolin'"
10. "Animal"
11. Vivian Campbell guitar solo
12. "Gods of War"
13. "Rocket"
14. "S.M.C."
15. "Bringin' On the Heartbreak" (acoustic/electric)
16. "From the Inside" (live debut: Joe Elliott acoustic)
17. "Have You Ever Needed Someone So Bad"
18. "Photograph"
19. "Armgeddon It"
20. "Pour Some Sugar on Me"
21. "Let's Get Rocked"
22. "Rock of Ages"

Taken from 31 December 1992 show in Phoenix, Arizona

1. "Let's Get Rocked"
2. "Tear It Down"
3. "Women"
4. "Too Late for Love"
5. "Hysteria"
6. "Make Love Like A Man"
7. Phil Collen guitar solo
8. "White Lightning"
9. "Foolin'"
10. "Animal"
11. Vivian Campbell guitar solo
12. "Gods of War"
13. "Rocket"
14. "Bringin' On the Heartbreak"
15. "Have You Ever Needed Someone So Bad"
16. "Armageddon It"
17. "Rock of Ages"
18. "Pour Some Sugar on Me"
19. "Love Bites"
20. "Photograph"

== Tour dates ==
Date	City	Country	Venue
Club Show
15 April 1992	Dublin	Ireland	McGonagles Club
The Freddie Mercury Tribute Concert
20 April 1992	London	England	Wembley Stadium
Club Tour
19 May 1992	Madrid	Spain	Sala Canciller
21 May 1992	Paris	France	Élysée Montmartre
22 May 1992	Villeurbanne	France	Le Transbordeur
24 May 1992	Munich	Germany	Theaterfabrik
25 May 1992	Milan	Italy	Rolling Stone
27 May 1992	Frankfurt	Germany	Music Hall
29 May 1992	Bonn	Germany	Biskuithalle
30 May 1992	Brussels	Belgium	Ancienne Belgique
31 May 1992	Hamburg	Germany	Docks
3 June 1992	Stockholm	Sweden	Melody Club
4 June 1992	Oslo	Norway	Rockefeller Music Hall
5 June 1992	Copenhagen	Denmark	Pumpehuset
7 June 1992	Amsterdam	Netherlands	Paradiso
Europe
19 June 1992	Dublin	Ireland	Point Theatre
21 June 1992	Glasgow	Scotland	Scottish Exhibition and Conference Centre
23 June 1992	Sheffield	England	Sheffield Arena
24 June 1992	Sheffield	England	Sheffield Arena
26 June 1992	London	England	Earls Court Exhibition Centre
27 June 1992	London	England	Earls Court Exhibition Centre
29 June 1992	Birmingham	England	National Exhibition Centre
30 June 1992	Birmingham	England	National Exhibition Centre
1 July 1992	Birmingham	England	National Exhibition Centre
3 July 1992	Belfast	Northern Ireland	King's Hall
Oceania
11 July 1992	Perth	Australia	Perth Entertainment Centre
14 July 1992	Adelaide	Australia	Adelaide Entertainment Centre
17 July 1992	Brisbane	Australia	Brisbane Entertainment Centre
19 July 1992	Melbourne	Australia	National Tennis Centre
20 July 1992	Melbourne	Australia	National Tennis Centre
22 July 1992	Sydney	Australia	Sydney Entertainment Centre
23 July 1992	Sydney	Australia	Sydney Entertainment Centre
25 July 1992	Auckland	New Zealand	The Supertop
26 July 1992	Auckland	New Zealand	The Supertop
28 July 1992	Sydney	Australia	Sydney Entertainment Centre
North America I
10 August 1992	New York City	United States	Madison Square Garden
13 August 1992	Norfolk	United States	Norfolk Scope
14 August 1992	Philadelphia	United States	The Spectrum
15 August 1992	Philadelphia	United States	The Spectrum
19 August 1992	Montreal	Canada	Montreal Forum
20 August 1992	Quebec City	Canada	Colisée de Québec
22 August 1992	Toledo	United States	John F. Savage Hall
23 August 1992	Toledo	United States	John F. Savage Hall
25 August 1992	Saginaw	United States	Wendler Arena
26 August 1992	Fort Wayne	United States	Allen County War Memorial Coliseum
28 August 1992	Rosemont	United States	Rosemont Horizon
29 August 1992	Rosemont	United States	Rosemont Horizon
30 August 1992	La Crosse	United States	La Crosse Center
1 September 1992	Cedar Rapids	United States	Five Seasons Center
2 September 1992	Manhattan	United States	Bramlage Coliseum
4 September 1992	Sioux Falls	United States	Sioux Falls Arena
5 September 1992	Bismarck	United States	Bismarck Civic Center
6 September 1992	Rapid City	United States	Rushmore Plaza Civic Center
11 September 1992	Salt Lake City	United States	Delta Center
12 September 1992	Boise	United States	BSU Pavilion
13 September 1992	Yakima	United States	Yakima Valley Sundome
15 September 1992	Casper	United States	Casper Events Center
16 September 1992	Billings	United States	MetraPark Arena
18 September 1992	Las Vegas	United States	Thomas & Mack Center
19 September 1992	San Diego	United States	San Diego Sports Arena
20 September 1992	Fresno	United States	Selland Arena
23 September 1992	Las Cruces	United States	Pan American Center
25 September 1992	Sacramento	United States	ARCO Arena
26 September 1992	Oakland	United States	Oakland-Alameda County Coliseum Arena
29 September 1992	Portland	United States	Portland Memorial Coliseum
30 September 1992	Pullman	United States	Beasley Coliseum
2 October 1992	Seattle	United States	Seattle Center Coliseum
3 October 1992	Vancouver	Canada	Pacific Coliseum
5 October 1992	Calgary	Canada	Olympic Saddledome
7 October 1992	Edmonton	Canada	Northlands Coliseum
8 October 1992	Saskatoon	Canada	Saskatchewan Place
10 October 1992	Winnipeg	Canada	Winnipeg Arena
North America II
21 October 1992	Toronto	Canada	Maple Leaf Gardens
22 October 1992	Binghamton	United States	Broome County Veterans Memorial Arena
24 October 1992	Richfield	United States	Richfield Coliseum
27 October 1992	East Rutherford	United States	Brendan Byrne Arena
28 October 1992	Albany	United States	Knickerbocker Arena
30 October 1992	Auburn Hills	United States	The Palace of Auburn Hills
31 October 1992	Rochester	United States	Rochester Community War Memorial
1 November 1992	Erie	United States	Erie Civic Center
3 November 1992	Landover	United States	Capital Centre
4 November 1992	Roanoke	United States	Roanoke Civic Center
6 November 1992	Richmond	United States	Richmond Coliseum
7 November 1992	Pittsburgh	United States	Pittsburgh Civic Arena
8 November 1992	Hershey	United States	Hersheypark Arena
10 November 1992	Indianapolis	United States	Market Square Arena
11 November 1992	Madison	United States	Dane County Coliseum
13 November 1992	Minneapolis	United States	Target Center
14 November 1992	Duluth	United States	Duluth Arena
16 November 1992	Milwaukee	United States	MECCA Arena
17 November 1992	South Bend	United States	Joyce Center
20 November 1992	Cincinnati	United States	Riverfront Coliseum
21 November 1992	Louisville	United States	Freedom Hall
22 November 1992	Birmingham	United States	BJCC Coliseum
24 November 1992	Atlanta	United States	The Omni Coliseum
25 November 1992	Johnson City	United States	Freedom Hall Civic Center
27 November 1992	Murfressboro	United States	Murphy Center
28 November 1992	Knoxville	United States	Thompson-Boling Arena
29 November 1992	Charleston	United States	Charleston Civic Center
1 December 1992	Battle Creek	United States	Kellogg Arena
2 December 1992	East Lansing	United States	Breslin Center
4 December 1992	Chattanooga	United States	UTC Arena
5 December 1992	Evansville	United States	Roberts Municipal Stadium
6 December 1992	Champaign	United States	Assembly Hall
8 December 1992	Green Bay	United States	Brown County Veterans Memorial Arena
9 December 1992	Green Bay	United States	Brown County Veterans Memorial Arena
11 December 1992	Huntsville	United States	Von Braun Civic Center
12 December 1992	Carbondale	United States	SIU Arena
13 December 1992	Rockford	United States	Rockford MetroCentre
15 December 1992	Des Moines	United States	Iowa Veterans Memorial Auditorium
16 December 1992	St. Louis	United States	St. Louis Arena
18 December 1992	Little Rock	United States	Barton Coliseum
19 December 1992	Kansas City	United States	Kemper Arena
20 December 1992	Tulsa	United States	Tulsa Convention Center
22 December 1992	Omaha	United States	Omaha Civic Auditorium
23 December 1992	Valley Center	United States	Britt Brown Arena
26 December 1992	Tucson	United States	Tucson Convention Center
28 December 1992	Albuquerque	United States	Tingley Coliseum
30 December 1992	Inglewood	United States	Great Western Forum
31 December 1992	Phoenix	United States	America West Arena
North America III
29 January 1993	St. Petersburg	United States	Bayfront Center
30 January 1993	Fort Myers	United States	Lee County Civic Center
2 February 1993	Miami	United States	Miami Arena
3 February 1993	Orlando	United States	Orlando Arena
5 February 1993	Jacksonville	United States	Jacksonville Memorial Coliseum
6 February 1993	Pensacola	United States	Pensacola Civic Center
7 February 1993	Tallahassee	United States	Leon County Civic Center
9 February 1993	Memphis	United States	Mid-South Coliseum
10 February 1993	Cape Girardeau	United States	Show Me Center
12 February 1993	Norman	United States	Lloyd Noble Center
13 February 1993	Austin	United States	Frank Erwin Center
14 February 1993	Odessa	United States	Ector County Coliseum
16 February 1993	Shreveport	United States	Hirsch Memorial Coliseum
17 February 1993	New Orleans	United States	UNO Lakefront Arena
19 February 1993	Dallas	United States	Reunion Arena
20 February 1993	Houston	United States	The Summit
21 February 1993	San Antonio	United States	Hemisfair Arena
23 February 1993	Lubbock	United States	Lubbock Municipal Coliseum
24 February 1993	Amarillo	United States	Amarillo Civic Center
26 February 1993	Denver	United States	McNichols Sports Arena
27 February 1993	Denver	United States	McNichols Sports Arena
28 February 1993	Rapid City	United States	Rushmore Plaza Civic Center
North America IV
8 March 1993	Lincoln	United States	Pershing Auditorium
10 March 1993	Peoria	United States	Peoria Civic Center
12 March 1993	Greenville	United States	Greenville Memorial Auditorium
14 March 1993	Chapel Hill	United States	Dean Smith Center
15 March 1993	Charlotte	United States	Charlotte Coliseum
16 March 1993	North Charleston	United States	North Charleston Coliseum
18 March 1993	Baltimore	United States	Baltimore Arena
19 March 1993	Buffalo	United States	Buffalo Memorial Auditorium
20 March 1993	Fairborn	United States	Ervin J. Nutter Center
23 March 1993	Lexington	United States	Rupp Arena
24 March 1993	Wheeling	United States	Wheeling Civic Center
26 March 1993	Uniondale	United States	Nassau Veterans Memorial Coliseum
27 March 1993	Hartford	United States	Hartford Civic Center
28 March 1993	Worcester	United States	The Centrum
30 March 1993	Providence	United States	Providence Civic Center
31 March 1993	Portland	United States	Cumberland County Civic Center
3 April 1993	Ottawa	Canada	Ottawa Civic Centre
5 April 1993	Moncton	Canada	Moncton Coliseum
6 April 1993	Halifax	Canada	Halifax Metro Centre
Europe
30 April 1993	Stockholm	Sweden	Globen Arena
1 May 1993	Gothenburg	Sweden	Scandinavium
2 May 1993	Oslo	Norway	Oslo Spektrum
4 May 1993	Helsinki	Finland	Helsinki Ice Hall
6 May 1993	Copenhagen	Denmark	Forum Copenhagen
7 May 1993	Hamburg	Germany	Alsterdorfer Sporthalle
9 May 1993	Würzburg	Germany	Carl-Diem-Halle
10 May 1993	Zürich	Switzerland	Hallenstadion
11 May 1993	Lausanne	Switzerland	Patinoire de Malley
13 May 1993	Brussels	Belgium	Forest National
14 May 1993	Paris	France	Zénith de Paris
16 May 1993	Toulouse	France	Palais des Sports de Toulouse
17 May 1993	Barcelona	Spain	Palau dels Esports de Barcelona
20 May 1993	Cascais	Portugal	Pavilhão de Cascais
21 May 1993	Madrid	Spain	Palacio de los Deportes
22 May 1993	San Sebastián	Spain	Velódromo de Anoeta
24 May 1993	Grenoble	France	Le Summum
25 May 1993	Sesto San Giovanni	Italy	Palasesto
27 May 1993	Munich	Germany	Olympiahalle
29 May 1993	Vienna	Austria	Rock in Vienna Festival
30 May 1993	Nürburg	Germany	Rock am Ring
6 June 1993	Sheffield	England	Don Valley Stadium
Japan
15 June 1993	Sendai	Japan	Sendai Sun Plaza
16 June 1993	Yokohama	Japan	Yokohama Bunka Taiikukan
18 June 1993	Osaka	Japan	Osaka Castle Hall
19 June 1993	Hiroshima	Japan	Hiroshima Kōsei Nenkin Kaikan
21 June 1993	Tokyo	Japan	Nippon Budokan
22 June 1993	Tokyo	Japan	Nippon Budokan
23 June 1993	Tokyo	Japan	Nippon Budokan
North America V
1 July 1993	Camrose	Canada	Camrose Exhibition Grounds
3 July 1993	Sea Bird Island	Canada	The Fox Festival
4 July 1993	George	United States	The Gorge Amphitheatre
6 July 1993	Sacramento	United States	Cal Expo Amphitheatre
7 July 1993	Mountain View	United States	Shoreline Amphitheatre
9 July 1993	San Bernardino	United States	Blockbuster Pavilion
10 July 1993	Irvine	United States	Irvine Meadows Amphitheatre
11 July 1993	Phoenix	United States	Desert Sky Pavilion
13 July 1993	Park City	United States	Park West Amphitheatre
14 July 1993	Greenwood Village	United States	Fiddler's Green Amphitheatre
16 July 1993	Moline	United States	MARK of the Quad Cities
17 July 1993	Lampe	United States	Swiss Villa Amphitheatre
18 July 1993	Bonner Springs	United States	Sandstone Amphitheatre
20 July 1993	Cincinnati	United States	Riverbend Music Center
21 July 1993	Cuyahoga Falls	United States	Blossom Music Center
23 July 1993	Clarkston	United States	Pine Knob Music Theatre
24 July 1993	Charlevoix	United States	Castle Farms Music Theatre
25 July 1993	East Troy	United States	Alpine Valley Music Theatre
30 July 1993	Middletown	United States	Orange County Fair Speedway
31 July 1993	Weedsport	United States	Cayuga County Fair Speedway
1 August 1993	Harveys Lake	United States	Bud Light Amphitheatre
3 August 1993	Allentown	United States	Great Allentown Fair
4 August 1993	Groton	United States	Thames River Pavilion
6 August 1993	Mansfield	United States	Great Woods Performing Arts Center
7 August 1993	Stowe	United States	Stowe Mountain Performing Arts Center
8 August 1993	Saratoga Springs	United States	Saratoga Performing Arts Center
10 August 1993	Holmdel Township	United States	Garden State Arts Center
11 August 1993	Philadelphia	United States	Mann Music Center
13 August 1993	Wantagh	United States	Jones Beach Marine Theater
14 August 1993	Wantagh	United States	Jones Beach Marine Theater
15 August 1993	Corfu	United States	Darien Lake Performing Arts Center
20 August 1993	St. John's	Canada	Labatt Ice Summer Blast '93
22 August 1993	Shediac	Canada	Labatt Ice Summer Blast '93
24 August 1993	Ottawa	Canada	Lansdowne Park
25 August 1993	Toronto	Canada	CNE Grandstand
27 August 1993	Columbus	United States	Cooper Stadium
28 August 1993	Tinley Park	United States	New World Music Theatre
29 August 1993	Maryland Heights	United States	Riverport Amphitheatre
31 August 1993	Fargo	United States	Fargodome
1 September 1993	Saint Paul	United States	Minnesota State Fair
3 September 1993	Noblesville	United States	Deer Creek Music Center
4 September 1993	Burgettstown	United States	Coca-Cola Star Lake Amphitheater
5 September 1993	Columbia	United States	Merriweather Post Pavilion
7 September 1993	Raleigh	United States	Hardee's Walnut Creek Amphitheatre
8 September 1993	Charlotte	United States	Blockbuster Pavilion
10 September 1993	Antioch	United States	Starwood Amphitheatre
11 September 1993	Atlanta	United States	Coca-Cola Lakewood Amphitheatre
12 September 1993	Jackson	United States	Mississippi Coliseum
14 September 1993	Biloxi	United States	Mississippi Coast Coliseum
15 September 1993	Baton Rouge	United States	LSU Assembly Center
17 September 1993	Dallas	United States	Coca-Cola Starplex Amphitheatre
18 September 1993	The Woodlands	United States	Cynthia Woods Mitchell Pavilion
20 September 1993	Oklahoma City	United States	Oklahoma State Fair
25 September 1993	Monterrey	Mexico	Auditorio Coca-Cola
28 September 1993	Mexico City	Mexico	Palacio de los Deportes
29 September 1993	Mexico City	Mexico	Palacio de los Deportes

== Touring personnel ==
Band

- Joe Elliott – lead vocals, rhythm and acoustic guitar, keyboards
- Phil Collen – lead and rhythm guitars, backing vocals
- Vivian Campbell – lead and rhythm guitars, backing vocals
- Rick Savage – bass, keyboards, rhythm and acoustic guitars, backing vocals
- Rick Allen – drums, backing vocals

Management

- Malvin Mortimer – tour manager
- Mark Spring – production manager
- Dick Adams – tour accountant
- Gary Perkins – stage manager
- Jonathan Smeeton – lighting/set designer
- Butch Allen – lighting director
- Robert Scovill – sound engineer
- Phil Wilkey – monitor engineer

Crew

- Peter Lothian – Vari*Lite programmer/operator
- Barry Branford – Intellabeam technician
- David Sutherland – bass technician
- Tony Moon – drum technician
- Stan Schiller – guitar technician
- Liam Col – guitar technician
- Mick Panasci – Vari*Lite technician
- Stewart Felix – Vari*Lite technician
- J.R. "Weasel" Engington – Dimmer technician
- Joe "Keebler" Campbell – tracking technician
- Ted Leamy – head sound technician
- Larry Vodopivek – sound technician
- David Stogner – sound technician
- Mark Tooch – sound technician
- Charlie Passarelli – head laser technician
- Harald Kohl – laser technician
- Gordon Hum – laser technician
