= Slang (disambiguation) =

Slang is the use of informal words and expressions in certain social settings.

Slang may also refer to:

- Slang (album), by Def Leppard
  - Slang (song), a song off the above-mentioned album
- S-Lang, an array-based scripting language, and programming library
- Slang (programming language), a subset of Smalltalk dialect used by OpenSmalltalk
- Slang (shading language)
- S (programming language), a statistical processing language and precursor to R
