= Breathe a Sigh =

1996 single by Def Leppard

- UK CD1

Single by Def Leppard

from the album Slang
- Released: 18 November 1996
- Length: 4:06
- Label: Mercury; Bludgeon Riffola
- Songwriter: Phil Collen
- Producers: Def Leppard; Pete Woodroffe

Def Leppard singles chronology
"All I Want Is Everything" (1996)	"Breathe a Sigh" (1996)	"Promises" (1999)

Alternative cover
- UK CD2

"Breathe a Sigh" is a song by English hard rock band Def Leppard from their sixth studio album, Slang (1996). It peaked at number 43 on the UK Singles Chart. The single was not accompanied with a music video.

== Background ==
In reference to the song, lead singer Joe Elliott said in the album's commentary that Breathe a Sigh is "a massive challenge for [him] to sing" and was "tried a lot of different ways [in the studio], but none of them ever seemed to do it any justice", so Def Leppard "stripped it right back" The song has not been played live since the Slang World Tour in 1997.

== Track listings ==
UK CD1

1. "Breathe a Sigh"
2. "Rock! Rock! (Till You Drop)" (live)
3. "Deliver Me" (live)
4. "Slang" (live)

UK CD2

1. "Breathe a Sigh"
2. "Another Hit & Run" (live)
3. "All I Want Is Everything" (live)
4. "Work It Out" (live)

== Charts ==
Chart (1996)	Peak position
Scotland Singles (OCC)	51
UK Singles (OCC)	43
UK Rock & Metal (OCC)	1

== Release history ==
Region	Date	Format(s)	Label(s)	Ref.
United States	12 November 1996	Contemporary hit radio	Mercury	
United Kingdom	18 November 1996	CD; cassette	Mercury; Bludgeon Riffola	
