= Slang World Tour =

1996–1997 concert tour by Def Leppard

- World tour by Def Leppard
- Promotional poster for the tour
- Location: Southeast Asia; North America; Europe; South Africa; South America
- Associated album: Slang
- Start date: 27 May 1996
- End date: 27 April 1997
- Legs: 4
- No. of shows: 127

Def Leppard concert chronology
- Adrenalize World Tour (1992–1993); Slang World Tour (1996–1997); Euphoria World Tour (1999–2000)

The Slang World Tour was a worldwide concert tour by English hard rock band Def Leppard in support of their album Slang, which was released in May 1996. Although Slang was the first Def Leppard album to feature new material with guitarist Vivian Campbell, this was his second tour with the band. Campbell joined Def Leppard just prior to their Adrenalize World Tour in 1992.

Musically, Slang was considered a radical departure from the band's signature sound of highly polished 1980s hard rock. Introspective songwriting, minimal studio production and Rick Allen's return to acoustic drums resulted in a more raw and organic sound. In a 2016 interview, Vivian Campbell reflected on the influence that 1990s grunge era bands such as Soundgarden had on the band's songwriting.

Concert production was also a radical departure from previous tours. The Slang World Tour introduced a completely revamped concert stage design. This was the first Def Leppard tour since the early 1980s to only employ "end stage" production design. Previous tours (Hysteria World Tour, Adrenalize World Tour) often employed "in the round" stage design. Rather than getting a 360-degree view of the band's performance with "in-the-round" staging, the "end stage" format created an atmosphere where all spectators faced the performance from one side. The new simplified configuration consisted of a rectangular stage with a wall of Marshall amplifiers positioned on each side of Rick Allen's drum kit. Also, in contrast to previous tours, the Slang World Tour featured a minimalist light show without laser effects.

== Opening acts ==
- Tripping Daisy
- Terrorvision

== Set list ==
Wings Stadium, Kalamazoo, Michigan (26 June 1996)

1. "Gift of Flesh"
2. "Another Hit and Run"
3. "Rock! Rock! (Till You Drop)"
4. "Foolin'"
5. "Animal"
6. "All I Want Is Everything"
7. "Have You Ever Needed Someone So Bad"
8. "Deliver Me"
9. "Hysteria"
10. "Work It Out"
11. "Slang"
12. "Bringin' On the Heartbreak"
13. "Switch 625"
14. "Two Steps Behind" (acoustic)
15. "Photograph"
16. "Rocket"
17. "Armageddon It"
18. "Pour Some Sugar on Me"
  Encore
19. "Love Bites"
20. "Let's Get Rocked"
21. "Rock of Ages"

== Tour dates ==
Date	City	Country	Venue
Asia / North America
27 May 1996	Bangkok	Thailand	Hua Mark Indoor Stadium
30 May 1996	Singapore		Singapore Indoor Stadium
1 June 1996	Jakarta	Indonesia	Jakarta Convention Center
4 June 1996	Kuala Lumpur	Malaysia	Stadium Negara
6 June 1996	Manila	Philippines	Folk Arts Theater
8 June 1996	Seoul	South Korea	Olympic Park Gymnasium
11 June 1996	Nagoya	Japan	Nagoya Congress Center
13 June 1996	Hiroshima	Japan	Hiroshima Kōsei Nenkin Kaikan
14 June 1996	Fukuoka	Japan	Fukuoka Sunpalace
17 June 1996	Osaka	Japan	Osaka-jō Hall
18 June 1996	Tokyo	Japan	Nippon Budokan
19 June 1996	Tokyo	Japan	Nippon Budokan
21 June 1996	Yokohama	Japan	Yokohama Cultural Gymnasium
22 June 1996	Sendai	Japan	Sendai Sun Plaza
26 June 1996	Kalamazoo	United States	Wings Stadium
28 June 1996	Cuyahoga Falls	United States	Blossom Music Center
29 June 1996	Noblesville	United States	Deer Creek Music Center
30 June 1996	Milwaukee	United States	Marcus Amphitheater
2 July 1996	Cincinnati	United States	Riverbend Music Center
3 July 1996	Columbus	United States	Polaris Amphitheater
5 July 1996	Tinley Park	United States	New World Music Theatre
6 July 1996	Charlevoix	United States	Castle Farms
7 July 1996	Clarkston	United States	Pine Knob Music Theatre
9 July 1996	Burgettstown	United States	Star Lake Amphitheatre
10 July 1996	Toronto	Canada	Molson Amphitheatre
12 July 1996	Corfu	United States	Darien Lake Performing Arts Center
13 July 1996	Hartford	United States	Meadows Music Theater
14 July 1996	Camden	United States	E-Center
16 July 1996	Mansfield	United States	Great Woods
17 July 1996	Wantagh	United States	Jones Beach Amphitheater
19 July 1996	Middletown	United States	Orange County Fair
20 July 1996	Scranton	United States	Toyota Pavilion at Montage Mountain
21 July 1996	Holmdel	United States	PNC Bank Arts Center
23 July 1996	Bristow	United States	Nissan Pavilion
24 July 1996	Virginia Beach	United States	Virginia Beach Amphitheatre
26 July 1996	Raleigh	United States	Walnut Creek Amphitheatre
27 July 1996	Charlotte	United States	Blockbuster Pavilion
28 July 1996	Pelham	United States	Oak Mountain Amphitheatre
30 July 1996	St. Louis	United States	Riverport Amphitheatre
31 July 1996	Little Rock	United States	Riverfront Amphitheatre
2 August 1996	Dallas	United States	Starplex Amphitheatre
3 August 1996	Austin	United States	South Park Meadows
4 August 1996	The Woodlands	United States	Cynthia Woods Mitchell Pavilion
North America
14 August 1996	West Palm Beach	United States	West Palm Beach Amphitheatre
16 August 1996	Atlanta	United States	Lakewood Amphitheatre
17 August 1996	Antioch	United States	Starwood Amphitheatre
18 August 1996	Lampe	United States	Black Oak Mountain
19 August 1996	Little Rock	United States	Barton Coliseum
20 August 1996	Oklahoma City	United States	Oklahoma City Zoo and Botanical Garden
21 August 1996	Bonner Springs	United States	Sandstone Amphitheater
23 August 1996	Greenwood Village	United States	Fiddler's Green Amphitheatre
24 August 1996	Ogden	United States	Wolf Mountain
26 August 1996	Phoenix	United States	Desert Sky Pavilion
27 August 1996	San Diego	United States	SDSU Open Air Theatre
29 August 1996	Irvine	United States	Irvine Meadows
30 August 1996	Sacramento	United States	California State Fair
31 August 1996	Mountain View	United States	Shoreline Amphitheatre
2 September 1996	George	United States	The Gorge Amphitheatre
3 September 1996	Vancouver	Canada	General Motors Place
5 September 1996	Calgary	Canada	Olympic Saddledome
6 September 1996	Edmonton	Canada	Edmonton Coliseum
7 September 1996	Saskatoon	Canada	Saskatchewan Place
9 September 1996	Winnipeg	Canada	Winnipeg Arena
11 September 1996	Sudbury	Canada	Sudbury Arena
13 September 1996	Montreal	Canada	Molson Centre
14 September 1996	Ottawa	Canada	Corel Centre
15 September 1996	Quebec City	Canada	Colisée Pepsi
17 September 1996	Saint John	Canada	Harbour Station
19 September 1996	Halifax	Canada	Halifax Metro Centre
20 September 1996	Moncton	Canada	Moncton Coliseum
Europe / Africa
5 October 1996	Oslo	Norway	Sentrum Scene
7 October 1996	Stockholm	Sweden	Cirkus
8 October 1996	Copenhagen	Denmark	K.B. Hallen
10 October 1996	Hamburg	Germany	Grosse Freiheit
11 October 1996	Berlin	Germany	Tempodrom
12 October 1996	Hanover	Germany	Music Hall
14 October 1996	Budapest	Hungary	Sports Hall
15 October 1996	Žilina	Slovakia	Sports Hall
16 October 1996	Prague	Czech Republic	Sports Hall
19 October 1996	Cologne	Germany	E-Werk
20 October 1996	Paris	France	Zenith
22 October 1996	Neu-Isenburg	Germany	Hugenottenhalle
23 October 1996	Stuttgart	Germany	Messe Congresscentrum
24 October 1996	Geneva	Switzerland	Arena
26 October 1996	San Sebastian	Spain	Polideportivo
27 October 1996	Barcelona	Spain	Zeleste
28 October 1996	Madrid	Spain	Riviera
30 October 1996	Lisbon	Portugal	Cascais Hall
3 November 1996	Innsbruck	Austria	Olympiahalle
4 November 1996	Vienna	Austria	Kurhalle
5 November 1996	Munich	Germany	Circus Krone
7 November 1996	Milan	Italy	Palalido
8 November 1996	Zürich	Switzerland	Hallenstadion
10 November 1996	Luxembourg City	Luxembourg	Pétange Centre Sportif
11 November 1996	Leuven	Belgium	Brabatnhall
14 November 1996	Sheffield	England	Sheffield Arena
15 November 1996	Birmingham	England	Birmingham NEC
18 November 1996	Belfast	Northern Ireland	Kings Hall
20 November 1996	Dublin	Ireland	The Point Theatre
22 November 1996	Manchester	England	Manchester Arena
23 November 1996	Newcastle	England	Newcastle Arena
24 November 1996	Glasgow	Scotland	Glasgow SECC
26 November 1996	London	England	Wembley Arena
27 November 1996	London	England	Wembley Arena
28 November 1996	Exeter	England	University of Exeter
29 November 1996	Cardiff	Wales	International Arena
30 November 1996	Bournemouth	England	International Centre
1 December 1996	Brighton	England	Brighton Centre
5 December 1996	Johannesburg	South Africa	Johannesburg Stadium
7 December 1996	Durban	South Africa	Kings Park Stadium
10 December 1996	Cape Town	South Africa	Green Point Stadium
Latin America
2 April 1997	Monterrey	Mexico	Auditorio Coca-Cola
4 April 1997	Mexico City	Mexico	Palacio de los Deportes
6 April 1997	Guatemala City	Guatemala	Plaza de Toros
8 April 1997	San Salvador	El Salvador	Estadio Nacional Adolfo Pineda
10 April 1997	Panama City	Panama	Entrada de Albrook
12 April 1997	Bogotá	Colombia	Parque Simón Bolívar
15 April 1997	Quito	Ecuador	Ruminahui Coliseum
~~18 April 1997~~	~~Santiago~~	~~Chile~~	~~Teatro Monumental~~
19 April 1997	Buenos Aires	Argentina	Teatro Gran Rex
20 April 1997	Buenos Aires	Argentina	Dr. Jekyll Pub
22 April 1997	Rio de Janeiro	Brazil	Metropolitan
23 April 1997	São Paulo	Brazil	Olympia
~~24 April 1997~~	São Paulo	Brazil	Olympia
27 April 1997	San Juan	Puerto Rico	Anfiteatro Luís Muñoz Marín

Key
~~Show~~	Denotes concert dates that were cancelled and/or rescheduled.

== Personnel ==
Credits taken from the Slang World Tour itinerary.

The band

- Joe Elliott – lead vocals
- Phil Collen – lead & rhythm guitars, backing vocals
- Vivian Campbell – lead & rhythm guitars, backing vocals
- Rick Savage – bass, backing vocals
- Rick Allen – drums

Management

- Malvin Mortimer – tour manager
- Jim Pendolino – tour accountant
- Mark Spring – production manager
- Butch Allen – set/lighting designer
- Brad Madix – FOH engineer
- Phil Wilkey – monitor engineer

Crew

- David Sutherland – stage manager/bass technician
- Stan Schiller – guitar technician
- David Wolff – guitar technician
- Tony Moon – drum technician
- Rich Locklin – lighting crew chief
- Jim Michaelis – lighting technician
- Ken Zibrat – lighting technician
- Michael Greene – lighting technician
- Larry Vodopivek – sound crew chief
- Rudy Dearing – sound technician
- Brad Judd – sound technician
