= All I Want Is Everything (Def Leppard song) =

1996 single by Def Leppard

- UK CD1 artwork, also used for most formats worldwide

Single by Def Leppard

from the album Slang
- B-side: "When Saturday Comes"; "Jimmy's Theme"; "'Cause We Ended as Lovers"; "Led Boots"
- Released: 16 September 1996
- Length: 5:20 (album version); 4:23 (radio edit)
- Label: Bludgeon Riffola; Mercury
- Songwriter: Joe Elliott
- Producers: Def Leppard; Pete Woodroofe

Def Leppard singles chronology
"Work It Out" (1996)	"All I Want Is Everything" (1996)	"Breathe a Sigh" (1996)

Alternative cover
- UK CD2 artwork

"All I Want Is Everything" is a song by the English hard rock band Def Leppard from their sixth studio album, Slang. The song reached number 38 on the UK Singles Chart and has not been played live by the band since the Slang World Tour in 1997.

== Background ==
In reference to the song, lead singer Elliott said in the album's commentary that "All I Want Is Everything" was "demoed as almost a country song, [the song] went through a lot of changes in the studio." Elliott also says that the song has "almost a U2 feel to it", and the "very solemn" lyrics sum up "a lot of what the band was going through at the time: births, deaths, divorces."

== Music video ==
The music video was directed by Matt Mahurin and shot at "Studios & Location" in August 1996. The video was released in September 1996.

== Track listings ==
CD: Bludgeon Riffola – Mercury / LEPCD 17 / 578 537-2

1. "All I Want Is Everything"
2. "When Saturday Comes"
3. "Jimmy's Theme"
4. "All I Want Is Everything" (edit)

CD: Bludgeon Riffola – Mercury / LEPDD 17 (UK) / 578 539-2

This version includes "Strictly Limited Edition Collector's Postcards". It contains the Slang, Retroactive, Adrenalize and Vault postcards, with the band members' comments on the back of each one.

1. "All I Want Is Everything"
2. "'Cause We Ended as Lovers"
3. "Led Boots"
4. "All I Want Is Everything" (edit)

CD: Bludgeon Riffola – Mercury / 314 578 548-2 / US

1. "All I Want Is Everything"
2. "Move With Me Slowly"

== Charts ==
Chart (1996)	Peak position
Canada Top Singles (RPM)	14
Scottish Singles Sales (Official Charts)	42
UK Singles (Official Charts)	38
UK Rock & Metal (Official Charts)	2

== Release history ==
Region	Date	Format(s)	Label(s)	Ref.
United States	16 July 1996	Contemporary hit radio	Mercury	
United Kingdom	16 September 1996	CD; cassette	Bludgeon Riffola; Mercury	
Japan	25 November 1996	CD	Bludgeon Riffola; Mercury	
