= List of UK Rock & Metal Albums Chart number ones of 1996 =

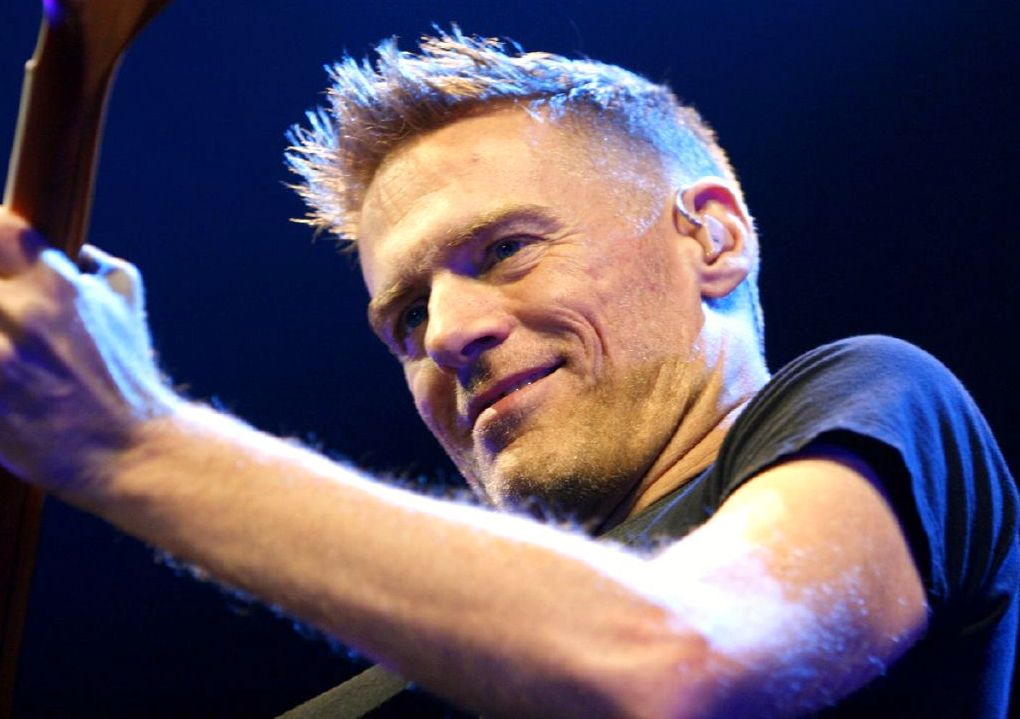
18 til I Die by Bryan Adams was the longest-running UK Rock & Metal Albums Chart number-one album of 1996, spending 15 weeks atop the chart.

The UK Rock & Metal Albums Chart is a record chart which ranks the best-selling rock and heavy metal albums in the United Kingdom. Compiled and published by the Official Charts Company, the data is based on each album's weekly physical sales, digital downloads and streams. In 1996, there were 22 albums that topped the 52 published charts. The first number-one album of the year was Queen's fifteenth and final studio album Made in Heaven, which spent the first four weeks of the year atop the chart at the end of an eleven-week run beginning in November 1995. The final number-one album of the year was 18 til I Die, the seventh studio album by Bryan Adams, which spent the last six weeks of the year at number one in its fifth spell of the year.

The most successful album on the UK Rock & Metal Albums Chart in 1996 was 18 til I Die by Bryan Adams, which spent a total of 15 weeks at number one over five different spells. It was also the best-selling rock album of the year, ranking 24th in the UK End of Year Albums Chart. The self-titled debut album by Garbage spent six weeks at number one in 1996, and was the 25th best-selling album of the year. Queen's Made in Heaven was number one for four weeks of the year, while Status Quo's Don't Stop and To the Faithful Departed by The Cranberries each spent three weeks atop the chart. Four albums – Sepultura's Roots, Pearl Jam's No Code, Nirvana's From the Muddy Banks of the Wishkah and Skunk Anansie's Stoosh – each spent two weeks at number one.

== Chart history ==
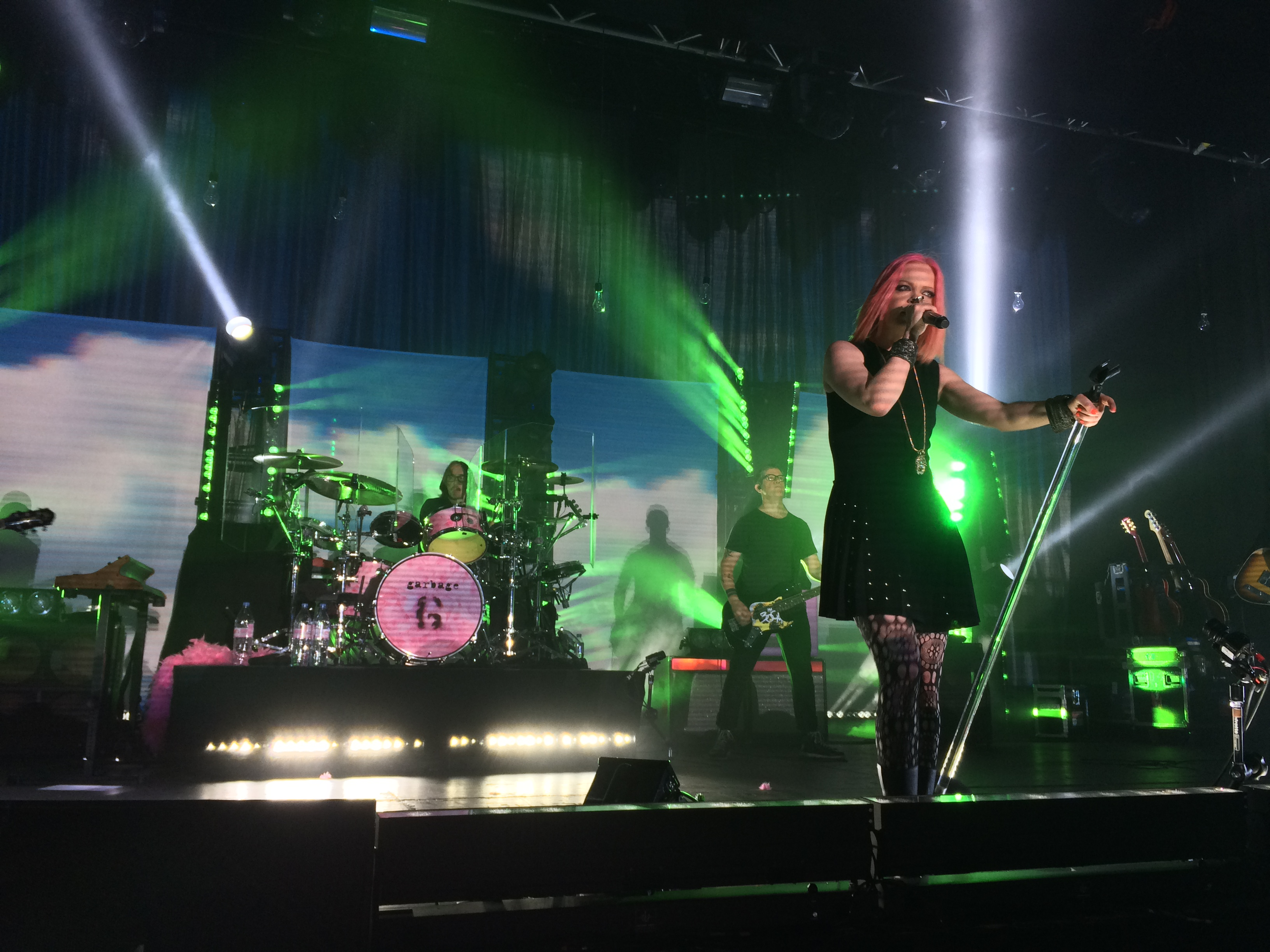
The self-titled debut album by Garbage spent six weeks at number one on the UK Rock & Metal Albums Chart in 1996.

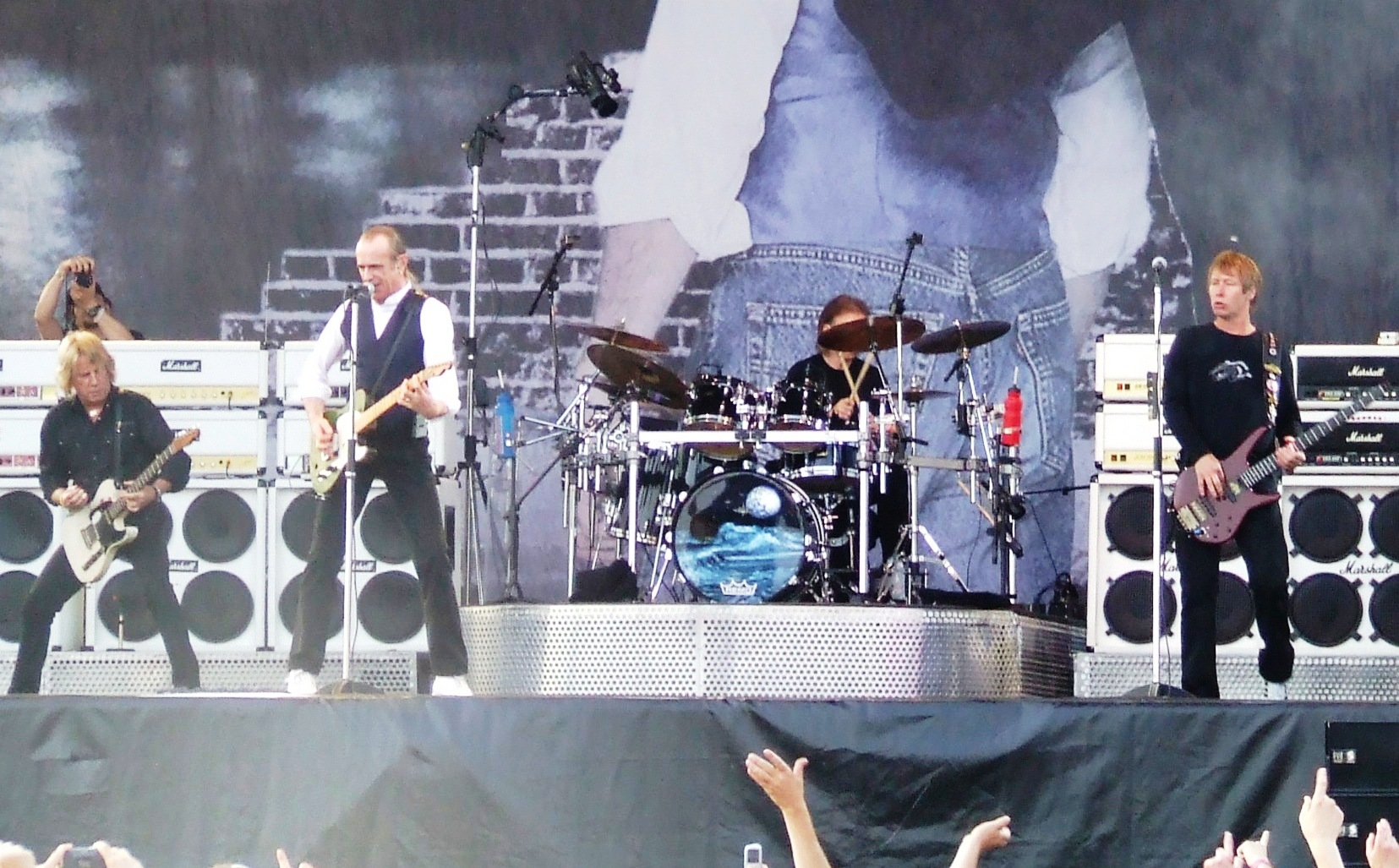
Status Quo were number one for three weeks in 1996 with Don't Stop.

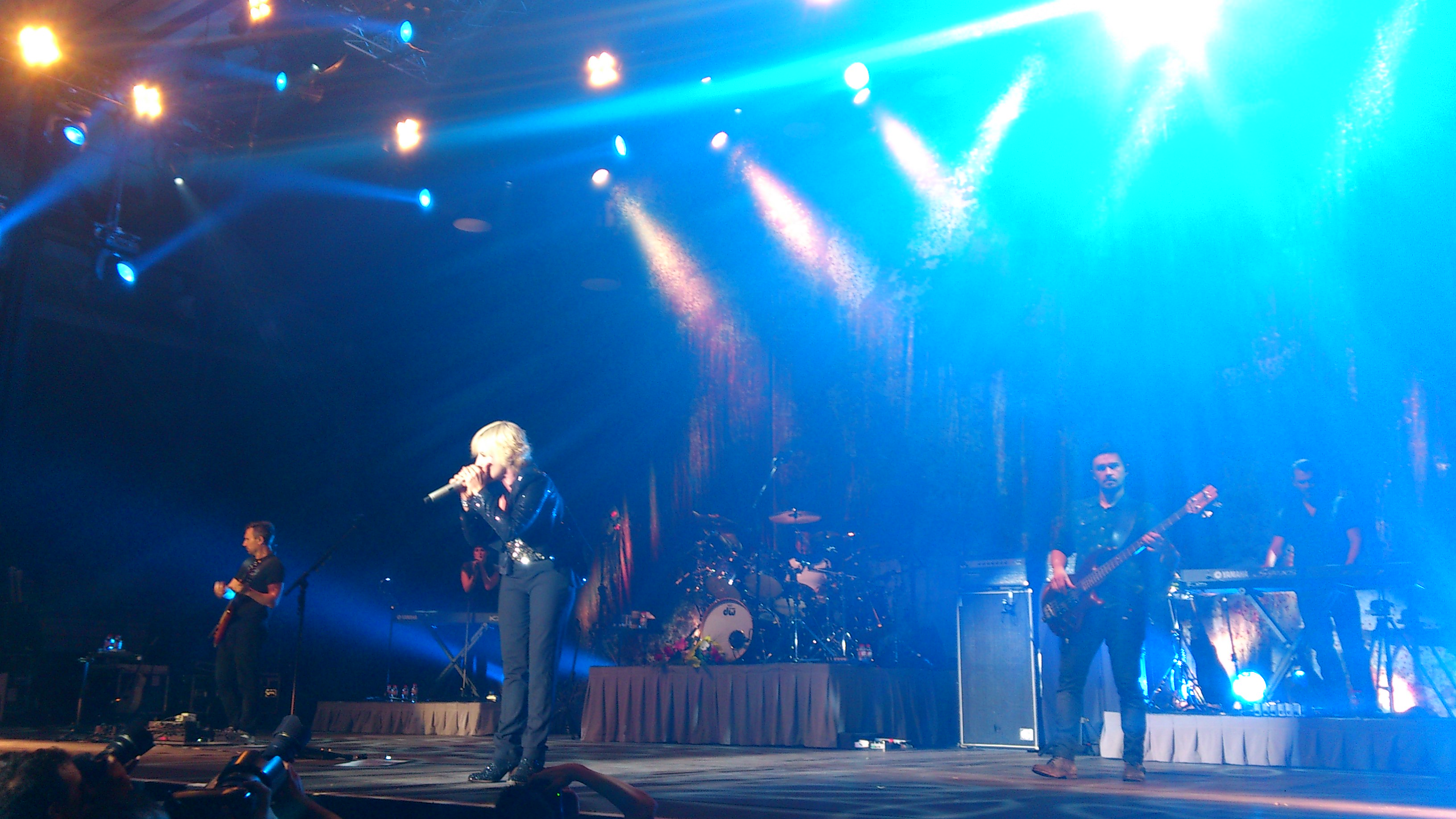
To the Faithful Departed, the third studio album by The Cranberries, spent three weeks at number one.

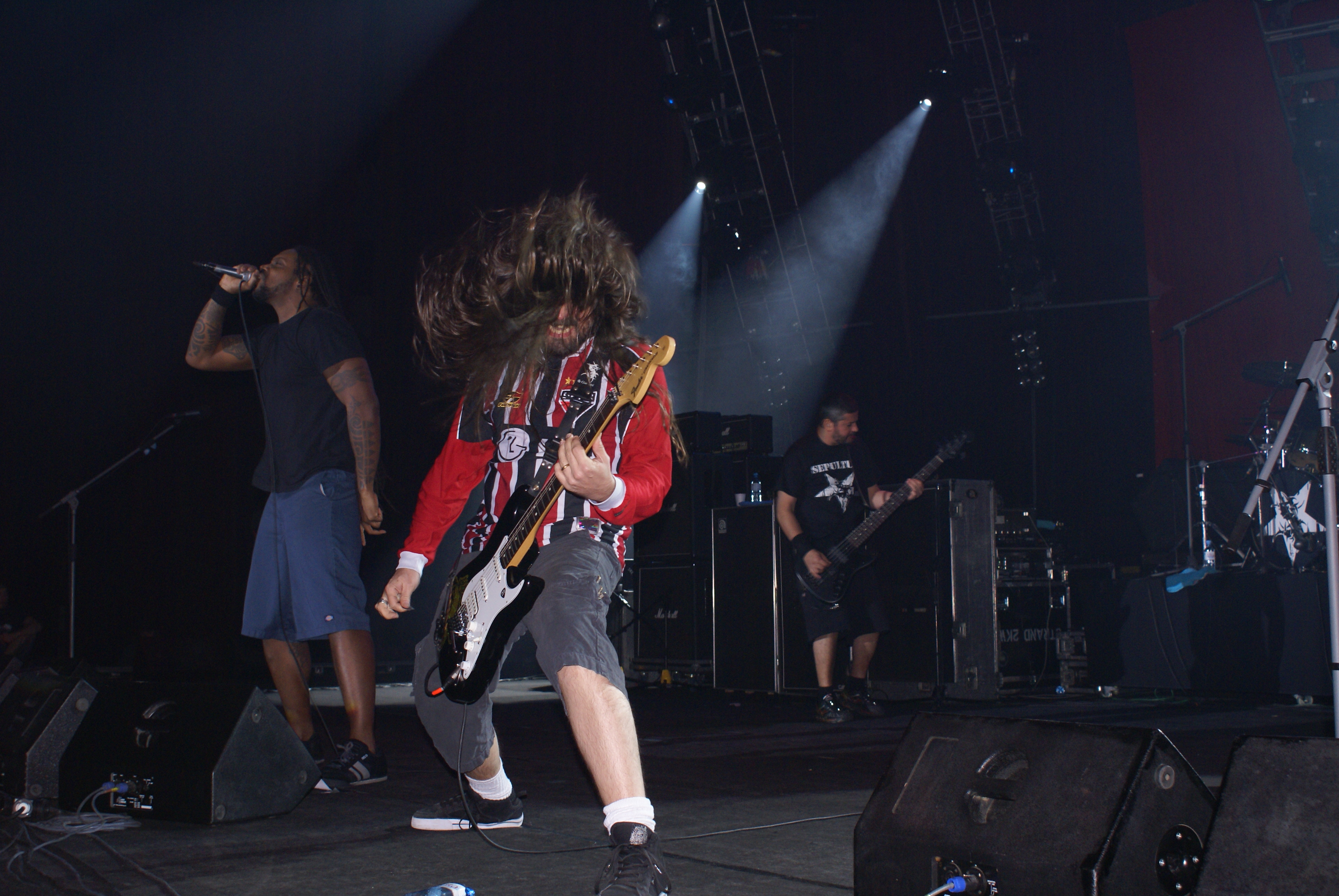
Sepultura's sixth studio album Roots spent two weeks at number one.

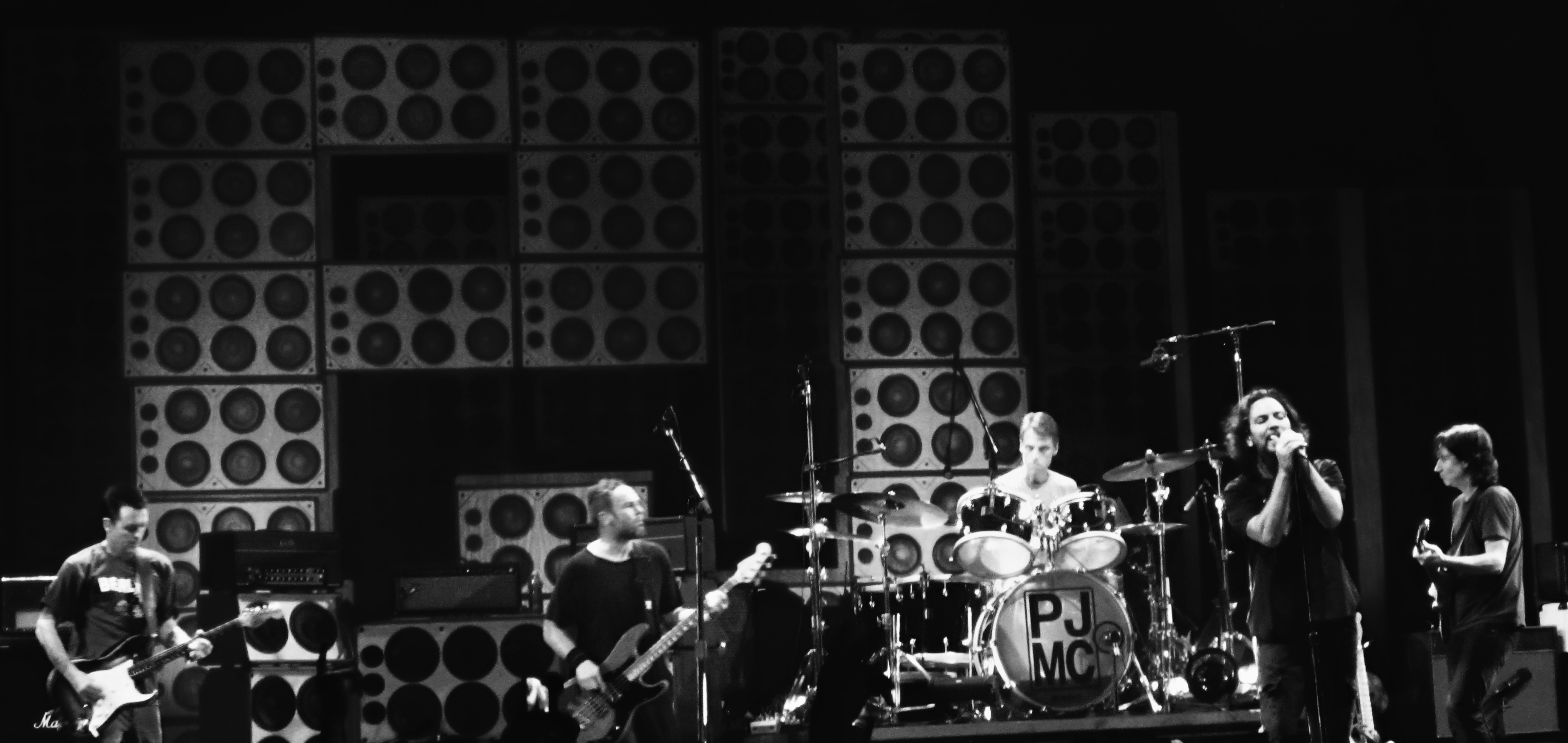
No Code by Pearl Jam was number one for two weeks in September.

Key
†	Indicates best-selling rock album of 1996

Issue date	Album	Artist(s)	Record label(s)	Ref.
6 January	Made in Heaven	Queen	Parlophone	
13 January	Made in Heaven	Queen	Parlophone	
20 January	Made in Heaven	Queen	Parlophone	
27 January	Made in Heaven	Queen	Parlophone	
3 February	Welcome to the Neighbourhood	Meat Loaf	Virgin	
10 February	Filth Pig	Ministry	Warner Bros.	
17 February	Don't Stop	Status Quo	PolyGram	
24 February	Don't Stop	Status Quo	PolyGram	
2 March	Don't Stop	Status Quo	PolyGram	
9 March	Roots	Sepultura	Roadrunner	
16 March	Roots	Sepultura	Roadrunner	
23 March	Regular Urban Survivors	Terrorvision	Total Vegas	
30 March	Garbage	Garbage	Mushroom	
6 April	Garbage	Garbage	Mushroom	
13 April	Garbage	Garbage	Mushroom	
20 April	Garbage	Garbage	Mushroom	
27 April	Evil Empire	Rage Against the Machine	Epic	
4 May	Garbage	Garbage	Mushroom	
11 May	To the Faithful Departed	The Cranberries	Island	
18 May	To the Faithful Departed	The Cranberries	Island	
25 May	To the Faithful Departed	The Cranberries	Island	
1 June	Down on the Upside	Soundgarden	A&M	
8 June	Garbage	Garbage	Mushroom	
15 June	Load	Metallica	Vertigo	
22 June	18 til I Die †	Bryan Adams	A&M	
29 June	18 til I Die †	Bryan Adams	A&M	
6 July	18 til I Die †	Bryan Adams	A&M	
13 July	18 til I Die †	Bryan Adams	A&M	
20 July	These Days	Bon Jovi	Mercury	
27 July	18 til I Die †	Bryan Adams	A&M	
3 August	Three Snakes and One Charm	The Black Crowes	American	
10 August	18 til I Die †	Bryan Adams	A&M	
17 August	18 til I Die †	Bryan Adams	A&M	
24 August	18 til I Die †	Bryan Adams	A&M	
31 August	Zero	The Smashing Pumpkins	Virgin	
7 September	No Code	Pearl Jam	Epic	
14 September	No Code	Pearl Jam	Epic	
21 September	Test for Echo	Rush	Atlantic	
28 September	18 til I Die †	Bryan Adams	A&M	
5 October	Best of the Beast	Iron Maiden	EMI	
12 October	From the Muddy Banks of the Wishkah	Nirvana	Geffen	
19 October	Stoosh	Skunk Anansie	One Little Indian	
26 October	Stoosh	Skunk Anansie	One Little Indian	
2 November	From the Muddy Banks of the Wishkah	Nirvana	Geffen	
9 November	Best Of: Volume I	Van Halen	Warner Bros.	
16 November	II	The Presidents of the United States of America	Columbia	
23 November	18 til I Die †	Bryan Adams	A&M	
30 November	18 til I Die †	Bryan Adams	A&M	
7 December	18 til I Die †	Bryan Adams	A&M	
14 December	18 til I Die †	Bryan Adams	A&M	
21 December	18 til I Die †	Bryan Adams	A&M	
28 December	18 til I Die †	Bryan Adams	A&M	

== See also ==
- 1996 in British music
- List of UK Rock & Metal Singles Chart number ones of 1996
