= Bud Light Amphitheatre =

Coordinates: 41.35296°N 76.03246°W

The Bud Light Amphitheatre was a 4,500-seat amphitheatre located in Harveys Lake, Pennsylvania. It opened in 1992 and closed in 1998. It hosted major artists such as Def Leppard, Deep Purple, Johnny Cash, Dream Theater, Sammy Hagar, Scorpions, Hall & Oates, Stone Temple Pilots, John Denver and Kenny Rogers.
