= Euphoria (Def Leppard album) =

Studio album by Def Leppard
- Released: 8 June 1999
- Recorded: May 1998 – March 1999
- Studios: Joe's Garage, Studios 1 and 2 (Dublin, Ireland)
- Genre: Pop metal
- Length: 51:07
- Label: Mercury
- Producers: Pete Woodroffe; Def Leppard

Def Leppard chronology
Slang (1996)	Euphoria (1999)	X (2002)

Singles from Euphoria
- 1. "Promises" Released: 24 May 1999 (Note: Released as a double A-side with "Back in Your Face" in the United Kingdom on 12 July.); 2. "Paper Sun" Released: 24 August 1999; 3. "Goodbye" Released: 20 September 1999; 4. "Day After Day" Released: 11 January 2000; 5. "21st Century Sha La La La Girl" Released: 20 June 2000

Professional ratings
Review scores
Source	Rating
AllMusic	4/5 stars
Entertainment Weekly	B+
Q	3/5 stars
Rolling Stone	2/5 stars

Euphoria is the seventh studio album by English rock band Def Leppard, released on 8 June 1999 in the United States and on 14 June 1999 in the United Kingdom by Mercury Records. The album aimed to return to their signature sound made famous by the band in the 1980s. It was produced by the band with Pete Woodroffe. The album charted at No. 11 on the Billboard 200 and No. 11 on the UK Albums Chart. It includes the song "Promises", which hit the number one spot on Billboard's Mainstream Rock chart.

== Overview ==
Following Slang, the band was initially unsure of which direction to take upon reconvening in April 1998. "We just let ourselves go in any way we wanted," recalled Joe Elliott. With Slang we did: we said we're not gonna do the typical Def Leppard things. But with Euphoria we didn't rule them out… because it had been eight [sic] years since Adrenalize. That's a long time to have abandoned your main style of music. So we embraced it."

Former producer Robert John "Mutt" Lange returned for four days. "It was a bit weird, because he wasn't working the same way," recalled Elliott. "He wasn't hands-on. He was more observant. He'd say, 'Stop,' and make a suggestion… We also wrote another song where we did kind of start from scratch. We said, 'Let's do something really off the wall.' That ended up being the song 'All Night' – all groovy noises and orgasmic songs." Three songs were co-written with Lange, who performed backing vocals (as he had on other albums): "It's Only Love", "All Night" and "Promises".

A song first recorded by Vivian Campbell's side band Clock, "To Be Alive", received a Leppard makeover. For the first time since 1981's High 'n' Dry, an instrumental was included: Phil Collen's "Disintegrate". This instrumental was known before as "Spanish Sky", a ballad that evolved into this track.

1996 Formula One racing champion Damon Hill, a neighbour of Rick Savage, would contribute a guitar solo to the track "Demolition Man".

In its first week of release, Euphoria sold over 98,000 copies in the U.S. and just missed the Top 10 of the Billboard 200, reaching No. 11. First single "Promises" topped Billboard's Mainstream Rock chart in June 1999, a spot the band had not held in six years.

Euphoria would later be certified gold in the US, Canada and Japan. The album-supporting tour stretched from May 1999 to September 2000.

The album was released for the first time on vinyl on 21 June 2019, as a part of The Collection: Volume 2 box set. It was then issued on its own in 2022.

== Reception ==
Euphoria received fairly positive reviews. Rating the album 4 out of 5, Stephen Thomas Erlewine of AllMusic notes in his retrospective assessment that despite the band returning to their signature sound "no longer guarantees a hit at the close of the '90s", Euphoria is "a tight, attractive album with more than its share of big hooks, strong riffs, and memorable melodies." He concludes by saying that "what's best about Euphoria is that it's utterly not self-conscious. Def Leppard feels free to try straight pop, appropriate Gary Glitter riffs, or play straight metal, without caring whether it's hip or commercial. That doesn't mean Euphoria is a classic, but it does mean that it's their most appealing effort in over a decade."

Greg Kot of Rolling Stone, however, was more critical. He notes that "the defining characteristic of Euphoria is its bloodlessness, from the robotic drum tracks to the disconcertingly inhuman tone of those trademark massed vocal choruses", concluding that "the flesh-and-blood Def Leppard apparently never made it out of the Eighties alive."

== Track listing ==
No.	Title	Writer(s)	Length
1.	"Demolition Man"	Phil Collen; Vivian Campbell; Joe Elliott	3:24
2.	"Promises"	Collen; Robert John "Mutt" Lange	4:00
3.	"Back in Your Face"	Elliott; Collen	3:20
4.	"Goodbye"	Rick Savage	3:36
5.	"All Night"	Collen; Lange	3:38
6.	"Paper Sun"	Collen; Campbell; Elliott; Savage; Pete Woodroffe	5:27
7.	"It's Only Love"	Elliott; Lange; Savage; Campbell	4:06
8.	"21st Century Sha La La La Girl"	Collen; Elliott; Savage	4:07
9.	"To Be Alive"	Campbell; P.J. Smith	3:53
10.	"Disintegrate" (instrumental)	Collen	2:51
11.	"Guilty"	Collen; Savage; Elliott; Campbell; Woodroffe	3:47
12.	"Day After Day"	Collen; Elliott; Campbell	4:36
13.	"Kings of Oblivion"	Elliott; Collen; Savage	4:22
Total length:			51:07

Japanese bonus track
No.	Title	Writer(s)	Length
14.	"I Am Your Child"	Elliott; Collen; Savage	3:27

Australian bonus tracks
No.	Title	Writer(s)	Length
14.	"Worlds Collide"	Elliott; Savage	3:45
15.	"Under My Wheels" (Alice Cooper cover)	Michael Bruce; Dennis Dunaway; Bob Ezrin	3:21

== Personnel ==
=== Def Leppard ===
- Joe Elliott – lead vocals
- Phil Collen – guitar, backing vocals
- Vivian Campbell – guitar, backing vocals
- Rick Savage – bass guitar, backing vocals
- Rick Allen – drums

=== Additional musicians ===
- Robert John "Mutt" Lange – additional vocals (on "Promises" and "All Night"), additional guitars (on "All Night")
- Damon "Demon" Hill – end guitar solo (on "Demolition Man")
- Ciaran McGoldrick – hey's & claps (on "Back in Your Face")
- Gary Sullivan – hey's & claps (on "Back in Your Face")
- Ricky Warwick – hey's & claps (on "Back in Your Face")

=== Technical personnel ===
- Pete Woodroffe – producer, engineer, mixing engineer (at The Townhouse, London)
- Ronan McHugh – engineer
- Ger McDonnell – engineer
- Bob Ludwig – mastering engineer (at Gateway Mastering, Portland, Maine)
- Andie Airfix – artwork
- Andy Earl – photography

== Charts ==
=== Weekly charts ===
Chart (1999)	Peak position
Australian Albums (ARIA)	59
Austrian Albums (Ö3 Austria)	48
Canada Top Albums/CDs (RPM)	32
Finnish Albums (Suomen virallinen lista)	16
French Albums (SNEP)	63
German Albums (Offizielle Top 100)	14
Japanese Albums (Oricon)	11
Norwegian Albums (VG-lista)	30
Scottish Albums (Official Charts)	20
Swedish Albums (Sverigetopplistan)	7
Swiss Albums (Schweizer Hitparade)	14
UK Albums (Official Charts)	11
UK Rock & Metal Albums (Official Charts)	1
US Billboard 200	11

=== Year-end charts ===
Chart (1999)	Position
US Billboard 200	193

== Certifications ==
Region	Certification	Certified units/sales
Canada (Music Canada)	Gold	50,000^{^}
Japan (RIAJ)	Gold	100,000^{^}
United States (RIAA)	Gold	500,000^{^}
^{^} Shipments figures based on certification alone.
