= Slang (album) =

1996 studio album by Def Leppard

Studio album by Def Leppard
- Released: 13 May 1996
- Recorded: May 1994–February 1996
- Studios: Marbella, Spain; Joe's Garage (Dublin, Ireland); Bow Lane Studios (Dublin, Ireland)
- Genre: Alternative rock
- Length: 45:58
- Label: Mercury
- Producers: Pete Woodroffe; Def Leppard

Def Leppard chronology
Vault: Def Leppard Greatest Hits (1980–1995) (1995)	Slang (1996)	Euphoria (1999)

Singles from Slang
- 1. "Slang" Released: 22 April 1996; 2. "Work It Out" Released: 10 May 1996; 3. "All I Want Is Everything" Released: 16 September 1996; 4. "Breathe a Sigh" Released: 18 November 1996

Slang is the sixth studio album by English rock band Def Leppard, released on 13 May 1996. The album marked a musical departure from their signature sound; it was produced by the band with Pete Woodroffe and was their first album since 1980 without involvement by Robert John "Mutt" Lange. Slang is the first album with new material to feature new guitarist Vivian Campbell (Campbell had previously played on the B-side collection Retro Active in 1993 and on the new song on Vault a year earlier). It charted at number 14 on the Billboard 200 and number 5 on the UK Albums Chart. It is also the only Def Leppard album that does not feature their recognisable font logo on the album cover, though all its singles still bore the classic logo.

== Overview ==
Between the releases of Retro Active and Slang, Def Leppard endured hardships including guitarist Phil Collen's divorce from actress Jacqueline Collen, bassist Rick Savage's battle with Bell's palsy and the death of his father, and the arrests of both drummer Rick Allen and lead singer Joe Elliott for spousal abuse and assault, respectively. Though the band says Adrenalize was recorded during a bleaker time, the absence of Mutt Lange (for the first time on a Def Leppard album since 1980) made it possible for the band to show what they were really feeling. Said Elliott, "There was a period with Mutt where if you came out with anything slightly negative, it was 'Fuck it!' and it was gone!" Collen continued: "We've all got personal things that have happened during the recording of Slang, and we've just ploughed on and some of it has come out on the record."

Doing without Lange's services, the band changed another habit by recording together as a band in the studio, in a rented townhouse in Marbella, Spain. The sessions commenced in May 1994, recording in Spain until November that year when sessions moved temporarily to Elliott's studio in Dublin. The band break between July and November 1995 to complete and promote the Vault compilation, briefly considering "Blood Runs Cold" and "Breathe A Sigh" for inclusion. Overdubs were completed in January and February 1996 at Bow Lane Studios in Dublin, Ireland. Slang would feature less production in favour of a more organic sound, catalysed by Allen's reversion to a semi-acoustic drum kit. "We'd got so sick of recording the old way [of doing parts separately]. We didn't want to do it any more. We wanted the music to be more personalised and let the character of the individuals come out," explained Savage.

"We knew we couldn't make a typical Def Leppard album in the mid-1990s," said Vivian Campbell. "Grunge was very much happening and our stuff was anathema at the time… Personally, I think we could have bolstered the songs with a little more of that Def Lep fairy dust… but instead we went, 'No, let's keep it raw: no backing vocals; let's not do that part because it's too melodic; let's be more monotone… At least it gave us the chance to grow up a little. We live in a state of arrested development in this band, singing songs like 'Let's Get Rocked'. So we did get to write some grown-up lyrics. And we were going through a lot of shit at that time: Sav's dad died on the eve of the first recording day; both Joe and Phil were going through divorces… So it gave us an opportunity to write lyrics that reflected the reality of our lives." Campbell also cited Soundgarden's album Superunknown (1994) as a major influence on the album's style, saying that it "was the record that we referenced in terms of the sonics and the mood of it when making Slang."

Songs such as "Turn to Dust" introduced sarangi and other instrumentation atypical for the band. The lyrical content featured a darker and more introspective turn for the most part, with lighter fare restricted to the Prince-influenced "Slang".

Slang was the first Def Leppard album to fail to achieve platinum sales in the US. Elsewhere, it performed better: it placed four singles on the UK charts, and went platinum in Canada. On the supporting tour the band performed for the first time in Southeast Asia, South Africa and South America. Only the album's title track has been played live after the Slang World Tour of 1996 to 1997 with it being performed regularly in the early 2000's and occasionally after, mostly recently during their 2023 performance at The Leadmill in Sheffield.

A limited edition release included a six-track bonus disc, "Acoustic in Singapore", recorded live in October 1995.

=== Deluxe edition ===
On 22 November 2011, Collen revealed in an interview with the Birmingham Express And Star newspaper that the band would plan to reissue Slang with extra tracks. He stated the band "...did have a lot of songs when we recorded, different versions, songs that never quite got finished." On 26 December 2011, Campbell gave an update on the reissue while speaking on his Facebook page in response to fan questions about Christmas songs. "We did once record a song called "Heavy Metal Christmas" during the Slang sessions - tongues very firmly in cheeks! It was actually a proper (and rather good!) song but was lacking lyrics - hence the goof-off title. It'll likely see the light of day when we re-release Slang soon. Some unheard stuff, too, as far as I know."

On 18 January 2012, Campbell mentioned on his Facebook that "Ownership of Slang masters (and all out-takes) revert to us later this year, so there's a good chance that we'll re-release with bonus material."

Elliott confirmed on his 25 August 2012 Planet Rock radio show that "...in a few months time we are re-releasing Slang as a double vinyl, a double CD with loads and loads of different mixes, bonus tracks and all sorts of stuff." This was followed by Elliott playing the band's 1999 Euphoria b-side 'Burnout' (first released on the "Goodbye" CD single) at the end of the show and revealing it had been recorded during the 1995/1996 Slang sessions. The singer described it as "...a little teaser", implying that the song may be included on the re-issue.

On 21 January 2014, it was announced on Def Leppard's Twitter page that Slang will be reissued on 11 February 2014. The album included 19 additional tracks, made up of various early versions of songs on the original, as well as previously unreleased material.

As of 2023, Slang remains the only album in Def Leppard's discography to not receive a re-release on vinyl outside of its inclusion in the "Volume 2" boxset in 2019, even after other albums from the 1990s such as Adrenalize, Retro Active and Euphoria were reissued in the preceding year.

== Reception ==
Professional ratings
Review scores
Source	Rating
AllMusic	link
Chicago Sun-Times	1.5/4 stars
The Cincinnati Post	(D+)
Entertainment Weekly	(B+) link
Sputnik Music	link
Rolling Stone	(mixed) link
Q	4/5 stars

Slang received mixed reviews. Stephen Thomas Erlewine of AllMusic rated the album three out of five, writing that the band's change in their approach with Slang was "apparent and welcome -- Def Leppard hasn't sounded so immediate since Pyromania." He further adds that the band "expand their musical vocabulary slightly, working elements of R&B and funk into the rhythms." Erlewine concludes that "Slang would have been even better if they had come up with a set of hooks that sounded as alive as their performance, but the album is a much-needed return to form for the group."

Conversely, Sputnik Music was more critical of the album, rating it two and a half out of five. They criticized Slang's seeming lack of direction and how "the veteran Sheffield outfit (alongside new co-producer Pete Woodroffe) decide to throw absolutely everything at the wall to see what sticks." They further added that "in progressing outside of their comfort zone, their limitations have become a little too apparent." Sputnik Music was, however, more positive towards "All I Want is Everything", "Work It Out", "Breath a Sigh" and "Deliver Me", deeming them to be "a solid and workmanlike mid-album quartet of tracks which make the album passable." They concluded that Slang "may be a passable release (if only just), but it leaves Def Leppard’s future very much up in the air."

"The whole thing is potty," David Quantick wrote in Q, "but in a supple and melodic way – even the ballads lack the usual Def Leppard sense of having been written for lead-lined hippos to sing. Slang is the sound of a band doing something fast and interesting, at the exact point in their lives when most bands are taking up golf and inhaling the contents of aquariums in country manors." Q later included the album among its 'best of 1996', describing it as "the work of a huge band, aware that the straight-ahead rock they once plied so enthusiastically is dead and who have embraced the new breed with élan."

In rankings of the band's albums, it was ranked sixth by Chad Childers of Loudwire, and eighth by Nick DeRiso of Ultimate Classic Rock. Childers called it one of the more polarising Def Leppard albums, in which "[the] band pushed the boundaries of their sound further than ever, experimenting with more industrial and electronic sounds." He added that while Slang was largely overlooked upon release, it has "aged quite well, with the catchy title track, the electronic 'All I Want Is Everything' and the snappy ballad 'Breathe a Sigh' among the standout tracks. The album showed the group willing to take risks and venture beyond the "Mutt"-mastered sound that had shot them to fame." DeRiso called it superior to how it was received in 1996, showcasing the group "in an introspective, guitar-focused mood." He continued, "Critics mocked them for 'going grunge,' and fans clearly weren't interested. (Slang became their first album not to go at least platinum.) But there's a welcome industrial crunch to 'Truth?,' and 'Work It Out' sounds like a cool hat tip to Rush. Give them credit for trying something new."

== Track listing ==
No.	Title	Writer(s)	Length
1.	"Truth?"	Vivian Campbell; Phil Collen; Joe Elliott; Rick Savage	3:00
2.	"Turn to Dust"	Collen	4:21
3.	"Slang"	Collen; Elliott	2:37
4.	"All I Want Is Everything"	Elliott	5:20
5.	"Work It Out"	Campbell	4:49
6.	"Breathe a Sigh"	Collen	4:06
7.	"Deliver Me"	Collen; Elliott	3:04
8.	"Gift of Flesh"	Collen	3:48
9.	"Blood Runs Cold"	Collen; Elliott	4:26
10.	"Where Does Love Go When It Dies"	Collen; Elliott	4:04
11.	"Pearl of Euphoria"	Collen; Elliott; Savage	6:21

Japanese bonus track
No.	Title	Writer(s)	Length
12.	"Move with Me Slowly"	Collen	6:19

1996 limited edition bonus disc: Acoustic in Singapore
No.	Title	Writer(s)	Length
1.	"Armageddon It"	Steve Clark; Collen; Elliott; Robert John "Mutt" Lange; Savage	4:16
2.	"Two Steps Behind"	Elliott	4:01
3.	"From the Inside"	Elliott	3:28
4.	"Animal"	Clark; Collen; Elliott; Lange; Savage	3:47
5.	"When Love & Hate Collide"	Elliott; Savage	4:18
6.	"Pour Some Sugar on Me"	Clark; Collen; Elliott; Lange; Savage	4:08

2014 deluxe edition: disc one
No.	Title	Writer(s)	Length
12.	"Move with Me Slowly"	Collen	6:19
13.	"Truth?" (original version (B-Side from "Work It Out" UK single)	Campbell; Collen; Elliott; Savage	5:09
14.	"Burn Out" (B-Side from "Goodbye" UK single)	Rick Allen; Campbell; Collen; Elliott; Savage	4:10
15.	"Worlds Collide" (B-Side from "Promises" UK single)	Elliott; Savage	3:43
16.	"Can't Keep Away from the Flame" (Japanese bonus track from Vault: Def Leppard Greatest Hits (1980–1995) and B-Side from "Slang" souvenir pack)	Collen; Elliott	2:36

2014 deluxe edition: disc two
No.	Title	Writer(s)	Length
1.	"Turn to Dust" (Phil verse vocal)	Collen	4:03
2.	"Raise Your Love" (version of "Slang")	Collen; Elliott	3:01
3.	"All I Want Is Everything" (1st draft)	Elliott	5:19
4.	"Work It Out" (1st draft)	Campbell	5:19
5.	"Breathe a Sigh" (Feb '96 rough mix)	Collen	4:08
6.	"Deliver Me" (Feb '96 rough mix)	Collen; Elliott	3:17
7.	"Black Train" (version of "Gift of Flesh")	Collen	4:06
8.	"Blood Runs Cold" (Feb '96 rough mix)	Collen; Elliott	4:12
9.	"Where Does Love Go When It Dies" (1st draft)	Collen; Elliott	4:36
10.	"Pearl of Euphoria" (Feb '96 rough mix)	Collen; Elliott; Savage	5:49
11.	"All on Your Touch" (2012 revisit)	Campbell	3:58
12.	"Anger" ("Deliver Me" 1st draft)	Collen; Elliott	3:15
13.	"Move on Up" (Vivian demo)	Campbell	3:31
14.	"Gift of Flesh" (Phil vocal)	Collen	4:03

2014 deluxe edition: iTunes Store bonus tracks
No.	Title	Writer(s)	Length
1.	"Truth?" (demo version) (B-Side from "Work It Out" UK single)	Campbell; Collen; Elliott; Savage	4:56
2.	"Work It Out" (original demo) (B-Side from "Work It Out" UK single)	Campbell	3:33
3.	"All I Want Is Everything" (demo version)	Elliott	5:03
4.	"Move with Me Slowly" (1st draft)	Collen	6:22
5.	"When Saturday Comes" (from the film When Saturday Comes and "All I Want Is Everything" single)	Elliott	4:21
6.	"Jimmy's Theme" (from the film When Saturday Comes and "All I Want Is Everything" single)	Eliott	3:20
7.	"Cause We Ended as Lovers" (from the Jeff Beck tribute album Jeffology: A Guitar Chronicle and "All I Want Is Everything" single)	Stevie Wonder	6:04
8.	"Led Boots" (from the Jeff Beck tribute album Jeffology: A Guitar Chronicle and "All I Want Is Everything" single)	Max Middleton	4:03

== Personnel ==
=== Def Leppard ===
- Joe Elliott – lead vocals, additional guitar and bass on "Pearl of Euphoria", production
- Phil Collen – guitars, mandolin, backing vocals, co - lead vocals on "Slang", production
- Vivian Campbell – guitars, dulcimer, backing vocals, production
- Rick Savage – bass, acoustic guitars, synth bass, backing vocals, production
- Rick Allen – drums, percussion, production

=== Additional personnel ===
- Gloria Flores – Spanish voice on "Slang"
- Ram Narayan – intro sarangi sample on "Turn to Dust"
- Craig Pruess – string and percussion arranging and conducting on "Turn to Dust"
- Av Singh – dohl on "Turn to Dust"
- Shyam Vatish – outro sarangi sample on "Turn to Dust"
- Pete Woodroffe – piano on "Blood Runs Cold", keyboard strings on "Where Does Love Go When It Dies", production, engineering, mixing
- Gavyn Wright – string leader on "Turn to Dust"

=== Technical personnel ===
- Ger McDonnell – engineering, programming on "Truth?"
- Matt Pakucko – mixing assistant
- Bob Ludwig – mastering
- Brad Buxer, Bobby Brooks – programming on "Slang" and "Breathe a Sigh"
- Hugh Drumm – programming on "Truth?"
- Jeff Murray – art direction
- Jager di Paola – design
- Cynthia Levine, Jeff Rooney – photography

== Charts ==
Chart (1996)	Peak position
Australian Albums (ARIA)	12
Canada Top Albums/CDs (RPM)	12
French Albums (SNEP)	24
Finnish Albums (Suomen virallinen lista)	13
Dutch Albums (Album Top 100)	61
German Albums (Offizielle Top 100)	34
Japanese Albums (Oricon)	38
Norwegian Albums (VG-lista)	25
New Zealand Albums (RMNZ)	14
Scottish Albums (Official Charts)	9
Swedish Albums (Sverigetopplistan)	5
Swiss Albums (Schweizer Hitparade)	19
UK Albums (Official Charts)	5
UK Rock & Metal Albums (Official Charts)	7
US Billboard 200	14

Chart (2014)	Peak position
UK Independent Albums (Official Charts)	49

== Certifications ==
Region	Certification	Certified units/sales
Canada (Music Canada)	Platinum	100,000^{^}
United Kingdom (BPI)	Gold	100,000^{^}
United States (RIAA)	Gold	500,000^{^}
^{^} Shipments figures based on certification alone.

== Notes ==
- Slang (CD booklet). Def Leppard. London, England: Mercury. 1996. 314 532 486-2.
- "Band Biography". DefLeppard.com. Def Leppard. Archived from the original on 11 December 2007.
