= Lampe, Missouri =

Unincorporated community in Missouri, U.S.

Coordinates: 36°33′49″N 93°26′17″W

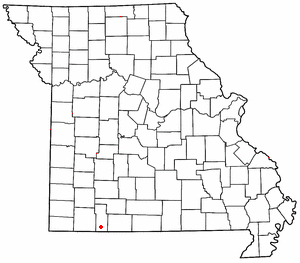

Lampe is an unincorporated community in southern Stone County, Missouri, United States. It is located on Route 13, south of Table Rock Lake.

The community is part of the Branson, Missouri Micropolitan Statistical Area. The ZIP Code for Lampe is 65681.
