= Promises (Def Leppard song) =

1999 single by Def Leppard

Single by Def Leppard

from the album Euphoria
- B-side: "Back in Your Face"
- Released: 24 May 1999
- Length: 3:58
- Label: Mercury; Bludgeon Riffola
- Songwriters: Phil Collen; Robert John "Mutt" Lange
- Producers: Pete Woodroffe; Def Leppard

Def Leppard singles chronology
"Breathe a Sigh" (1996)	"Promises" (1999)	"Paper Sun" (1999)

Part two artwork
- Part two of the UK "Promises" / "Back in Your Face" set

Music video
- "Promises" on YouTube

"Promises" is a song by English rock band Def Leppard from their seventh studio album, Euphoria (1999). It was released as a single in the United States in May 1999 and reached number one on the US Billboard Mainstream Rock Tracks chart. Two months later, the single was released in the United Kingdom and peaked at number 41 on the UK Singles Chart. "Promises" is a staple of the band's live performances. Due to its popularity among fans, Def Leppard has performed the song over six hundred times as of November 2026, making it one of the group's top 25 most played pieces.

== Overview ==
The song was also featured on the second disc of their compilation Rock of Ages: The Definitive Collection, released in 2005. A live version is featured on their live album Viva! Hysteria, released in October 2013. In addition to the CD versions of the single, a 7-inch was released for jukeboxes with "Pour Some Sugar on Me" as the B-side. It would be the final Def Leppard single released on the 7-inch format until 2018. It is also one of the few songs from that period of their career that has been performed live on successive tours other than the one directly supporting its parent album.

== Reception ==
AllMusic wrote: ""Promises" is Def Leppard at its best: infectious melodies and childishly poignant lyrics."

== Track listings ==
UK CD1

1. "Promises"
2. "Back in Your Face"
3. Album snippets
4. "Promises" (video)

UK CD2

1. "Back in Your Face"
2. "Promises"
3. "Worlds Collide"

US CD single

1. "Promises"
2. "Paper Sun"

UK 7-inch single

1. "Promises"
2. "Pour Some Sugar on Me"

== Charts ==
=== Weekly charts ===
Weekly chart performance for "Promises"
Chart (1999)	Peak position
Canada Top Singles (RPM)	18
Canada Rock/Alternative (RPM)	2
Scottish Singles Sales (Official Charts)	43
UK Singles (Official Charts)	41
UK Rock & Metal (Official Charts)	1
US Bubbling Under Hot 100 (Billboard)	2
US Mainstream Rock Airplay (Billboard)	1
US Pop Airplay (Billboard)	38

=== Year-end charts ===
Year-end chart performance for "Promises"
Chart (1999)	Position
Canada Rock/Alternative (RPM)	4
US Mainstream Rock Tracks (Billboard)	17

== Release history ==
Release dates and formats for "Promises"
Region	Date	Format(s)	Label(s)	Ref(s).
United States	24 May 1999	Mainstream rock; active rock radio	Mercury; Bludgeon Riffola	
United Kingdom	12 July 1999	CD; cassette	Mercury; Bludgeon Riffola	

== Other versions ==
In 2018, singer-songwriter Matt Nathanson included his cover of "Promises" on Pyromattia. The album is composed entirely of Def Leppard covers and features songs from High 'N' Dry, Pyromania, Hysteria, and Euphoria.
