= When Love & Hate Collide =

1995 single by Def Leppard

- UK CD1 artwork, also used for the cassette

Single by Def Leppard

from the album Vault: Def Leppard Greatest Hits (1980–1995)
- B-side: "Can't Keep Away from the Flame"
- Written: 1990
- Released: 2 October 1995
- Genre: Rock
- Length: 4:18
- Label: Mercury; Bludgeon Riffola
- Songwriters: Joe Elliott; Rick Savage
- Producers: Def Leppard; Pete Woodroofe

Def Leppard singles chronology
"Action" (1994)	"When Love & Hate Collide" (1995)	"Slang" (1996)

Alternative cover
- UK CD2 artwork, also used in Germany

Music video
- "When Love & Hate Collide" on YouTube

"When Love & Hate Collide" is a song by English rock band Def Leppard from their 1995 greatest hits album Vault, written by Joe Elliott and Rick Savage. The power ballad, released by Mercury Records, was originally written and demoed for Adrenalize, but not finalized until 1995 for its inclusion on Vault. The demo version is much more heavily produced in the signature style of Hysteria and Adrenalize, and the final version is more stripped down, supposedly toward the style of the following studio album Slang. The original demo version contains the final recorded guitar solo by late original guitarist Steve Clark.

"When Love & Hate Collide" became one of their most successful singles in the band's homeland, where it reached number two in the UK Singles Charts, but it failed to make a significant impact in the United States, reaching number 58 on the Billboard Hot 100. It did become a top-10 hit in Canada, climbing to number six on the RPM 100 Hit Tracks chart. The song also reached the top spot in Ireland. In 2008, the song was re-recorded, this time with featured vocals of American singer-songwriter Taylor Swift. The original version was re-released as a digital download on 12 February 2013.

== Background ==
"When Love & Hate Collide" was written by lead singer Joe Elliott and bassist Rick Savage in Summer 1990 during the writing and recording sessions for the band's fifth studio album Adrenalize. According to Elliott on the liner notes on the band's Best of compilation, the song was written when guitarist Steve Clark was in rehab. They then recorded a demo of the song at Savage’s home studio, featuring what turned out to be Clark's final recorded guitar solo before his leave of absence in September 1990 and his subsequent death in 1991.

The song was ultimately left off the track listing for Adrenalize, with the band preferring "Have You Ever Needed Someone So Bad" according to guitarist Phil Collen. According to Elliott on the Adrenalize Deluxe Edition liner notes, the inclusion of the song would have been "one ballad too many" so they set it aside for their next album.

The song resurfaced whilst the band were recording their sixth studio album Slang in 1994. According to new guitarist Vivian Campbell on the Best of liner notes, their record label wanted a "syrupy-sounding" single for a possible compilation album, but they had "nothing at all in that vein". So the band sent over the demo to the label. As "the suits at the label really loved it", the band took a break from the production of Slang to record a new version of the song. According to Collen, the new recording took two weeks to complete, "which was really good for us". They re-used Stevie Vann’s backing vocals from the original 1990 demo.

Elliott said to a fan question "Why did it take so long to release Vault?" during a late 1995 promotional appearance on the MuchMusic programme Intimate and Interactive that the band had not come to fully agreeing to that decision until July of that year. Before the decision had come, the song was already considered for Slang, but evidently it did not suit the change in musical direction they took for the album. The decision to release Vault instead allowed the band to fully "close the door" on the Steve Clark era and to continue working on Slang.

== Critical reception ==
Pan-European magazine Music & Media wrote in their review of the single, "An epic ballad in the finest Leppard tradition, this track comes armed with a killer hook."

== Music video ==
There are 3 different versions of the accompanying music video for "When Love & Hate Collide", all of which are available on DVD:

- Band-only version (most commonly used version available on Visualize / Video Archive DVD)
- 4-minute "epic" version (available on Visualize/Video Archive DVD and Best of the Videos DVD, this version features future Survivor: The Australian Outback contestant Jerri Manthey)
- 8-minute condensed epic version (available on Best of the Videos DVD as a bonus feature)

== Track listings ==
- CD: Mercury / Bludgeon Riffola / PY 840 / 852 429-2 / LC-7179 (UK)
1. "When Love & Hate Collide"
2. "Rocket"
3. "Armageddon It"
- CD: Mercury / Bludgeon Riffola / 422 852 424-2 (US)
1. "When Love & Hate Collide"
2. "Can't Keep Away From the Flame"
- Cassette: Mercury / Bludgeon Riffola / LEPMC 14 (UK) / 852 401-4 (INT)
1. "When Love & Hate Collide"
2. "Pour Some Sugar on Me"
- CD: Mercury / Bludgeon Riffola / LEPCD 14 (UK) / 852 401-2 (INT)
1. "When Love & Hate Collide"
2. "Pour Some Sugar on Me"
3. "Armageddon It"
4. "When Love & Hate Collide" (original demo with Steve Clark's final solo)
- CD: Mercury / Bludgeon Riffola / LEPDD 14 / PY 940 / LC 7179 (UK)
1. "When Love & Hate Collide"
2. "Rocket"
3. "Excitable"
- CD: Mercury / Bludgeon Riffola / LEPCJ 14 (UK) / Not for Resale
1. "When Love & Hate Collide" (album version) – 4:16
2. "When Love & Hate Collide" (A/C mix) – 4:17
3. "When Love & Hate Collide" (no strings) – 4:17

== Personnel ==
=== Def Leppard ===
- Joe Elliott – lead vocals, producer
- Phil Collen – lead guitar, backing vocals, producer
- Vivian Campbell – rhythm guitar, backing vocals, producer (1995 final recording)
- Steve Clark – rhythm guitar, guitar solo (1990 demo)
- Rick Savage – bass, backing vocals, producer
- Rick Allen – drums, producer

=== Additional personnel ===
- Pete Woodroffe – producer, engineer (1995 final recording)
- Michael Kamen – string arrangements (1995 final recording)
- Stevie Vann – backing vocals
- Randy Kerber – piano (1995 final recording)

== Charts ==
=== Weekly charts ===
Chart (1995–1996)	Peak position
Australia (ARIA)	22
Belgium (Ultratop 50 Wallonia)	28
Canada Top Singles (RPM)	6
Canada Adult Contemporary (RPM)	41
Estonia (Eesti Top 20)	17
Europe (Eurochart Hot 100)	16
Europe (European Hit Radio)	6
European Adult Contemporary (Music & Media)	14
Finland Airplay (IFPI Finland)	35
Germany (GfK)	67
Hungary Airplay (Music & Media)	7
Iceland (Íslenski Listinn Topp 40)	27
Ireland (IRMA)	1
Israel (Israeli Singles Chart)	13
Mexico International (Notitas Musicales)	4
Netherlands (Single Top 100)	41
New Zealand (Recorded Music NZ)	27
Poland Airplay (Music & Media)	2
Quebec Airplay (ADISQ)	4
Scottish Singles Sales (Official Charts)	3
Spain Airplay (Music & Media)	14
Switzerland (Schweizer Hitparade)	36
UK Singles (Official Charts)	2
UK Rock & Metal (Official Charts)	1
US Billboard Hot 100	58
US Adult Pop Airplay (Billboard)	39
US Pop Airplay (Billboard)	29
US Cash Box Top 100	56

=== Year-end charts ===
Chart (1995)	Position
UK Singles (OCC)	54
UK Airplay (Music Week)	36

Chart (1996)	Position
Canada Top Singles (RPM)	64
US Top 40/Mainstream (Billboard)	99

== Release history ==
Region	Date	Format(s)	Label(s)	Ref.
United Kingdom	2 October 1995	CD1; cassette	Mercury; Bludgeon Riffola	
United Kingdom	9 October 1995	CD2	Mercury; Bludgeon Riffola	
Australia	16 October 1995	CD; cassette	Mercury; Bludgeon Riffola	
United States	23 October 1995	Rock radio	Mercury; Bludgeon Riffola	
United States	24 October 1995	Contemporary hit radio	Mercury; Bludgeon Riffola	
