= Work It Out (Def Leppard song) =

1996 single by Def Leppard

- UK CD1 artwork, also used for most formats worldwide

Single by Def Leppard

from the album Slang
- Released: 10 May 1996
- Studio: Marbella, Spain; Fine Bow Lane (Dublin, Ireland)
- Length: 4:49
- Label: Mercury; Bludgeon Riffola
- Songwriter: Vivian Campbell
- Producers: Def Leppard; Pete Woodroffe

Def Leppard singles chronology
"Slang" (1996)	"Work It Out" (1996)	"All I Want Is Everything" (1996)

Alternative cover
- UK CD2 artwork

"Work It Out" is a song by the English hard rock band Def Leppard from their sixth studio album, Slang. It was written entirely by their new guitarist Vivian Campbell. It was released as a single in Japan on 10 May 1996 and in the United Kingdom on 1 July, reaching number six on the US Billboard Mainstream Rock Tracks chart and number 22 on the UK Singles Chart.

== Background ==
Lead singer Joe Elliott said in the album's commentary that Work It Out " was Vivian Campbell's first songwriting contribution to the band" and that Elliott "had this opportunity to channel [his] inner Iggy Pop instead of screeching in this high register like [he had] always done in the past". The music video was directed by Nigel Dick in April 1996 at Occidental Studios in Los Angeles, California. The video was released in May 1996. "Work It Out" has not been played live by the band since the Slang World Tour in 1997.

== Track listing ==
CD Bludgeon Riffola - Mercury/LEPDD16 (UK)/578 271-2 (INT)

This single contains collector's postcards of classic Def Leppard album covers. It contains the On Through the Night, High 'n' Dry, Pyromania and Hysteria postcards, with band members comments on the back.

- "Work It Out"
- "Work It Out" (original demo version)
- "Truth?" (original demo Version)

CD Bludgeon Riffola - Mercury/LEPCD16 (UK)/578 270-2 (INT)

- "Work It Out"
- "Move With Me Slowly"
- "Two Steps Behind" (live acoustic version)

CD Bludgeon Riffola - Mercury/LC0268 (UK)/578 293-2 (INT)

- "Work It Out"
- "Move With Me Slowly"
- "Work It out" (original demo)
- "Truth?" (original version)

== Charts ==
=== Weekly charts ===
Chart (1996)	Peak position
Australia (ARIA)	43
Canada Top Singles (RPM)	10
Europe (Eurochart Hot 100)	72
Scottish Singles Sales (Official Charts)	30
UK Singles (Official Charts)	22
UK Rock & Metal (Official Charts)	1
US Mainstream Rock (Billboard)	6

=== Year-end charts ===
Chart (1996)	Position
Canada Top Singles (RPM)	95
US Mainstream Rock Tracks (Billboard)	48

== Release history ==
Region	Date	Format(s)	Label(s)	Ref.
Japan	10 May 1996	CD	Mercury; Bludgeon Riffola	
United States	21 May 1996	Contemporary hit radio	Mercury; Bludgeon Riffola	
United Kingdom	1 July 1996	—N/a	Mercury; Bludgeon Riffola	
