= Slang (song) =

1996 single by Def Leppard

Single by Def Leppard

from the album Slang
- B-side: "Animal" (acoustic); "Ziggy Stardust" (acoustic); "Pour Some Sugar on Me" (acoustic)
- Released: 22 April 1996
- Length: 2:37
- Label: Bludgeon Riffola; Mercury
- Songwriters: Joe Elliott; Phil Collen
- Producers: Def Leppard; Pete Woodroffe

Def Leppard singles chronology
| "When Love & Hate Collide" (1995) | "Slang" (1996) | "Work It Out" (1996) |

"Slang" is a song by the English rock band Def Leppard and the title track from their album of the same name. It reached number 17 on the UK Singles Chart. The song is the only one from its parent album to be played after the 1996–1997 Slang World Tour, with Def Leppard performing the song most recently during their 2026 tour.

== Background ==
In reference to the song, lead singer Elliot said in the album's commentary that Slang is "a bit of a throwback to [Def Leppard's] original sound, in other words loads and loads of backing vocals" and said that "live, this song has always been a favourite with fans".

== Music video ==
The music video was directed by Nigel Dick. Recorded on Occidental Studios, Los Angeles in April 1996. The video was released in May 1996. An additional "Director's Cut" video was released in October 2004, included on the Best of the Videos DVD.

== Track listing ==
Mexican single

1. "Slang"
2. "Animal" (Acoustic)
3. "Ziggy Stardust" (Acoustic)
4. "Pour Some Sugar on Me" (Acoustic)

Souvenir Pack

1. "Slang"
2. "Can't Keep Away from the Flame"
3. "When Love & Hate Collide (Strings & Piano only version)"

== Charts ==
| Chart (1996) | Peak position |
|---|---|
| Australia (ARIA) | 90 |
| Canada Top Singles (RPM) | 30 |
| Europe (Eurochart Hot 100) | 72 |
| Scottish Singles Sales (Official Charts) | 18 |
| Sweden (Sverigetopplistan) | 57 |
| UK Singles (Official Charts) | 17 |
| UK Rock & Metal (Official Charts) | 1 |
