= Winger discography =

Discography of Winger, an American hard rock band

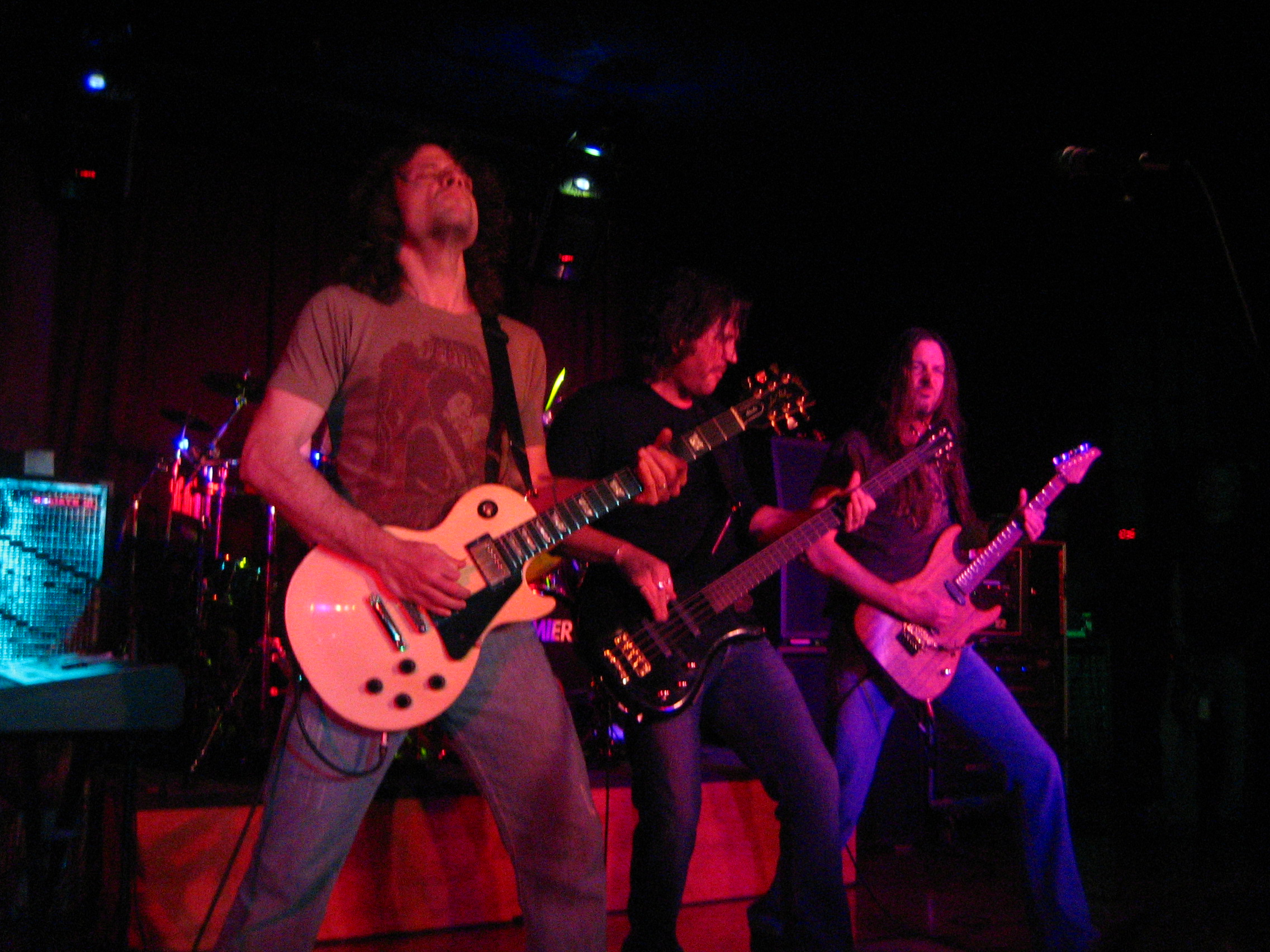
- Studio albums: 7
- Live albums: 1
- Compilation albums: 2
- Singles: 8
- Music videos: 20

The discography of Winger, an American hard rock band, consists of seven studio albums, one live album, two compilation albums and eight singles.

== Albums ==
=== Studio albums ===
Title	Details	Peak positions	Certifications (sales threshold)
Title	Details	US	Certifications (sales threshold)
Winger	Release date: August 1, 1988; Label: Atlantic; Format: LP, cassette, CD	21	US: Platinum; CAN: Gold; JPN: Gold
In the Heart of the Young	Release date: July 24, 1990; Label: Atlantic; Format: LP, cassette, CD	15	US: Platinum
Pull	Release date: May 18, 1993; Label: Atlantic; Format: LP, cassette, CD	83	
IV	Release date: October 20, 2006; Label: Frontiers; Formats: CD, digital download	—	
Karma	Release date: October 16, 2009; Label: Frontiers; Format: LP, CD, digital download	—	
Better Days Comin'	Release date: April 22, 2014; Label: Frontiers; Format: LP, CD, digital download	85	
Seven	Release date: May 5, 2023; Label: Frontiers; Format: LP, CD, digital download	—	

=== Live albums ===
Title	Details
Winger Live	Release date: November 27, 2007; Label: Frontiers Records; Formats: CD, digital download

=== Compilation albums ===
Title	Details
The Very Best of Winger	Release date: October 2, 2001; Label: Atlantic/Rhino Entertainment; Formats: CD, cassette
Demo Anthology	Release date: July 17, 2007; Label: Cleopatra Records; Formats: CD, digital download

== Singles ==
Year	Single	Peak chart positions			Album
Year	Single	US	US Main	UK	Album
1988	"Madalaine"	—	27	—	Winger
1989	"Seventeen"	26	19	—	Winger
1989	"Headed for a Heartbreak"	19	8	—	Winger
1989	"Hungry"	85	34	—	Winger
1990	"Can't Get Enuff"	42	6	—	In the Heart of the Young
1990	"Miles Away"	12	14	56	In the Heart of the Young
1991	"Easy Come Easy Go"	41	17	—	In the Heart of the Young
1993	"Down Incognito"	—	15	—	Pull
"—" denotes releases that did not chart

== Videos ==
=== Video albums ===
- The Videos: Volume One (1989)
- In the Heart of the Young Part 1 (1990)
- In the Heart of the Young Part 2 (1991)
- Live in Tokyo (1991)
- The Making of Pull (1993)
- The Making of Winger IV (2006)
- Winger Live (2007)

=== Music videos ===
- "Madalaine" (Winger)
- "Seventeen" (Winger)
- "Headed for a Heartbreak" (Winger)
- "Hungry" (Winger)
- "Can't Get Enuff" (In the Heart of the Young)
- "Miles Away" (In the Heart of the Young)
- "Silent Night" (In the Heart of the Young)
- "Easy Come, Easy Go" (In the Heart of the Young)
- "You Are the Saint, I Am the Sinner" (In the Heart of the Young)
- "Down Incognito" (Pull)
- "Spell I'm Under" (Pull)
- "In My Veins" (Pull)
- "Who's the One" (Pull)
- "Blue Suede Shoes (acoustic)" (IV)
- "Deal With The Devil" (Karma)
- "Rat Race" (Better Days Comin')
- "Midnight Driver Of a Love Machine" (Better Days Comin')
- "Tin Soldier" (Better Days Comin')
- "Better Days Comin'" (Better Days Comin')
- "Queen Babylon" (Better Days Comin')
- "Proud Desperado" (Seven)
- "It All Comes Back Around" (Seven)
- "Tears Of Blood" (Seven)
- "Voodoo Fire" (Seven)

== Soundtracks and B-sides ==
- "Out for the Count" – Only released on The Karate Kid Part III Soundtrack. 1989
- "All I Ever Wanted" – Session track from In the Heart of the Young. Released as a B-side to the single "Miles Away"; track 3. 1990
- "Never" – Session track from In the Heart of the Young. Released as a B-side to the single "Headed For A Heartbreak (1991 Remix)"; Track 4. 1991
- "Battle Stations" – Only released on the Bill & Ted's Bogus Journey Soundtrack. 1991
