= The Very Best of Winger =

Greatest hits album by Winger
- Released: October 2, 2001
- Recorded: 1988–2001
- Genres: Glam metal; hard rock; heavy metal
- Length: 73:48
- Labels: Atlantic; Rhino Entertainment
- Producers: Beau Hill; Mike Shipley; Kip Winger

Winger chronology
Pull (1993)	The Very Best of Winger (2001)	IV (2006)

The Very Best of Winger is a greatest hits album by American rock band Winger, released by Atlantic Records and Rhino Entertainment in October 2001.

Most of the songs on the album were collected from the first three Winger studio albums: Winger (1988), In the Heart of the Young (1990), and Pull (1993). However, one new recording called "On the Inside" was featured, as well as a Japanese bonus track from Pull called "Hell to Pay". According to frontman Kip Winger, "On the Inside" was a leftover riff from the Pull sessions that he and Reb Beach worked into a complete song for the release of this compilation.

The album has a track listing essentially in reverse chronological order, with the more recently finished the song the earlier it appears.

== Reception ==
Professional ratings
Review scores
Source	Rating
AllMusic	4/5 stars

AllMusic critic Stephen Thomas Erlewine lauded the release, stating that it proved that the group had "some good hooks, a good guitarist in Reb Beach, nice chemistry within the band, and a knack for a power ballad". Erlewine noted that among heavy-sounding "bands of the late '80s/early '90s... they were the brunt of more jokes than any of their peers", most notably on the subversive program Beavis and Butt-Head. However, in his view, that did not change Winger's ability to generate multiple "classics", which the album collects. Erlewine additionally praised the album's detailed liner notes.

== Track listing ==
1. "On the Inside" (Kip Winger, Reb Beach) – 4:24
2. "Blind Revolution Mad" (Winger, Beach) – 5:26
3. "Down Incognito" (Winger, Beach) – 3:48
4. "Spell I'm Under" (Winger) – 3:56
5. "Who's the One" (Winger, Beach) – 5:46
6. "Junkyard Dog (Tears on Stone)" (Winger, Beach) – 6:55
7. "Hell to Pay" (Winger, Beach) – 3:24
8. "Can't Get Enuff" (Winger, Beach) – 4:24
9. "Under One Condition" (Winger, Beach) – 4:30
10. "Easy Come Easy Go" (Winger) – 4:06
11. "Rainbow in the Rose" (Winger, Beach) – 5:34
12. "Miles Away" (Paul Taylor) – 4:15
13. "Seventeen" (Winger, Beach, Beau Hill) – 4:12
14. "Madalaine" (Winger, Beach) – 3:47
15. "Hungry" (Winger, Beach) – 4:01
16. "Headed for a Heartbreak" (Winger) – 5:15

== Personnel ==
- Kip Winger – vocals, bass, keyboards
- Reb Beach – guitar, vocals
- Rod Morgenstein – drums and percussion
- Paul Taylor – guitar, keyboards, vocals
- John Roth – guitar, vocals

== See also ==
- Winger discography
