= Demo Anthology =

Compilation album by Winger
- Released: July 17, 2007
- Genres: Hard rock; glam metal; heavy metal
- Length: 150:38
- Label: Cleopatra

Winger chronology
IV (2006)	Demo Anthology (2007)	Winger Live (2007)

Demo Anthology is a 2007 collection of hits and previously unreleased demos by the rock band Winger. The demo material is taken from recording sessions of the debut album Winger (1988) up to Pull (1993).

"Hour of Need" was rewritten by the band, and eventually surfaced as "In My Veins" on the album Pull. "Star Tripper" was reworked and was turned into "Baptized by Fire" on the album In the Heart of the Young. "Give Me More" was also rewritten, and eventually surfaced as "Hell to Pay" on the Japanese version of Pull. This track is also included on the 2001 compilation The Very Best of Winger.

== Reception ==
Professional ratings
Review scores
Source	Rating
AllMusic	2.5/5 stars
Melodic.net	4/5 stars

German magazine Rock Hard stated, "It goes without saying that this collection is only intended for fans who want to understand how the songs (further) developed in the studio. Alongside sleaze smashers such as 'Madelaine', 'Hungry', 'Headed For A Heartbreak', 'Seventeen'. 'Easy Come Easy Go', 'Can't Get Enuff' or 'Miles Away', there are also ten (not even bad) songs to discover that didn't make it onto the regular releases at the time. Even if some of the demos are probably already known in fan circles, this is a respectable compilation."

AllMusic stated that the compilation was only for "fanatics", arguing that the demo songs did not sound much different to the album versions.

== Track listing ==
=== Disc 1 ===
1. "Madalaine" – 4:20
2. "Hungry" – 4:08
3. "Seventeen" – 3:54
4. "State of Emergency" – 3:04
5. "Time to Surrender" – 4:14
6. "Hangin' On" – 3:21
7. "Headed for a Heartbreak" – 4:39
8. "Only Love" – 3:29 *
9. "Can't Get Enuff" – 3:47
10. "Loosen Up" – 3:39
11. "Miles Away" – 4:04
12. "Easy Come Easy Go" – 3:26
13. "Rainbow in the Rose" – 5:17
14. "In the Day We'll Never See" – 3:29
15. "Under One Condition" – 4:31
16. "Little Dirty Blonde" – 3:39
17. "Star Tripper" – 3:37 *
18. "You Are the Saint, I Am the Sinner" – 3:19
19. "In the Heart of the Young" – 3:42

=== Disc 2 ===
1. "All I Ever Wanted" – 3:30
2. "Skin Tight" – 3:00 *
3. "Someday Someway" – 4:15 *
4. "Never" – 4:52
5. "Blind Revolution Mad" – 5:47
6. "Down Incognito" – 3:56
7. "Spell I'm Under" – 3:42
8. "Hour of Need" – 3:59 *
9. "Junk Yard Dog" – 6:53
10. "The Lucky One" – 4:55
11. "Like a Ritual" – 4:42
12. "In for the Kill" – 4:35
13. "No Man's Land" – 3:30
14. "Who's the One" – 4:53
15. "Written in the Wind" – 4:10 *
16. "Until There Was You" – 3:10 *
17. "Without Warning" – 2:57 *
18. "Give Me More" – 3:10 *
19. "Just Another Face" – 3:32 * (Japanese release bonus track)
- * Previously unreleased tracks

== Personnel ==
- Kip Winger – bass guitar, lead vocals, keyboards, acoustic guitar
- Reb Beach – lead & rhythm guitars, backing vocals
- Paul Taylor – keyboards, rhythm guitar, effects, backing vocals
- Rod Morgenstein – drums, percussion, backing vocals
