= Winger Live =

2007 live album by Winger

Live

Live album by Winger
- Released: November 27, 2007
- Recorded: Live in USA
- Genres: Hard rock; heavy metal; glam metal
- Label: Frontiers
- Producer: Kip Winger

Winger chronology
| Demo Anthology (2007) | Live (2007) | Karma (2009) |

Live

Video by Winger
- Released: November 27, 2007
- Genres: Hard rock; heavy metal; glam metal
- Length: 96:56
- Label: Frontiers
- Director: Jack Edward Sawyers
- Producer: Kip Winger

Winger chronology
| The Making of Winger IV (2006) | Live (2007) |

Professional ratings
Review scores
| Source | Rating |
|---|---|
| Allmusic | 3/5 stars |

Winger Live is a two CD and DVD live set culled from Winger 2007 US reunion tour and directed by Jack Edward Sawyers. Kip Winger, Reb Beach, Rod Morgenstein and John Roth rip through all the hits, progressive jams and new material taken from their comeback album IV. Keyboardist Cenk Eroglu was not present for this show, despite his appearance on IV. The concert was recorded live straight through with no interruptions at the Galaxy Concert Theater in Santa Ana, California. The cover consists of a checkerboard-style grid of live still frames pulled from the video footage itself.

== Track list ==
=== CD 1 ===
1. "Blind Revolution Mad" - 4:01
2. "Loosen Up" - 3:42
3. "Easy Come Easy Go" - 3:42
4. "Your Great Escape" - 4:02
5. "Down Incognito" - 5:19
6. "Rainbow in the Rose" - 5:29
7. "Generica" - 7:58
8. "Junk Yard Dog" - 4:11

=== CD 2 ===
1. "Right Up Ahead" - 4:56
2. "Reb's Guitar Solo" - 4:13
3. "You Are the Saint, I Am the Sinner" - 5:08
4. "Rod's Drum Solo" - 6:56
5. "Headed for a Heartbreak" - 6:22
6. "Can't Get Enuff" - 4:33
7. "Seventeen" - 7:34
8. "Who's the One" - 5:19
9. "Miles Away" - 4:33
10. "Hungry" (DVD edition only)
11. "Madalaine" - 5:32
12. "Blue Suede Shoes" - 3:26 (CD version only)
