= Down Incognito =

Studio album by Kip Winger
- Released: 1999
- Recorded: Rising Sun Studios, Santa Fe, NM
- Length: 52:46
- Label: Domo Records
- Producer: Kip Winger

Kip Winger chronology
This Conversation Seems Like a Dream (1997)	Down Incognito (1999)	Songs from the Ocean Floor (2001)

Down Incognito was the second solo album by American rock artist Kip Winger. It was released by Domo Records in 1999.

The album was released under different names. Down Incognito is the American title, while it was called Made by Hand in Europe, and Another Way in Japan.

The album mostly consists of acoustic studio versions of songs from the three Winger albums and Kip Winger's first solo album. The exceptions are album opener "Another Way", which is a new song for this recording, and the two last songs, "Rainbow in the Rose" and "Blind Revolution Mad", which are acoustic live versions from a show in Paris. According to Kip, he came up with the acoustic arrangements for these songs during his tour of Borders bookstores, when he needed to learn to play the many Winger hits on an acoustic 12-string guitar.

== Track listing ==
1. "Another Way" (Kip Winger, Noble Kime) – 4:39 (new song)
2. "Down Incognito" (Winger, Reb Beach) – 3:08
3. "Under One Condition" (Winger, Beach) – 4:11
4. "Miles Away" (Paul Taylor) – 4:00
5. "Steam" (Winger, Paul Winger) – 3:30
6. "Headed for a Heartbreak (Winger) – 3:03
7. "How Far Will We Go" (Winger) – 5:02
8. "Naked Son" (Winger) – 3:56
9. "Spell I'm Under" (Winger) – 3:54
10. "Easy Come Easy Go" (Winger) – 2:49
11. Who's The One (Winger, Beach) – 4:26 ('Another Way' Bonus Track)
12. "Daniel" (Winger) – 4:23
13. "Rainbow in the Rose" (Live) (Winger, Beach) – 5:15 ('Down Incognito' Bonus Track)
14. "Blind Revolution Mad" (Live) (Winger, Beach) – 4:49 ('Down Incognito' Bonus Track)

== Personnel ==
=== Studio ===
- Kip Winger – vocals, guitars, bass guitar
- Noble Kime – piano
- Robby Rothschild – percussion
- Jonathan Arthur – additional vocals on "Under One Condition"
- Marc Archer – pedal steel guitar
- Andy Timmons – additional guitars on "Daniel"
- Mark Clark – percussion on "Daniel"
- David Felberg – 1st violin on "Daniel"
- Willy Sucre – 2nd violin on "Daniel"
- Jonathan Amerding – viola on "Daniel"

=== Live in Paris Acoustic Band ===
- Kip Winger – vocals, guitar
- John Roth – guitars, vocals
- Robbie Rothschild – percussion
- Joe Tucker – bass

== Album credits ==
- Produced, engineered and mixed by Kip Winger
- "Daniel" mixed by Mike Shipley
- Assistant engineers: Pete Cotutsca and Bob Sniderman
- Recorded and mixed at Rising Sun Studios, Santa Fe, NM
- Mastered by Paul Blakemore at Airshow Mastering

== See also ==
- Kip Winger
