= John Roth (musician) =

American guitarist (born 1967)

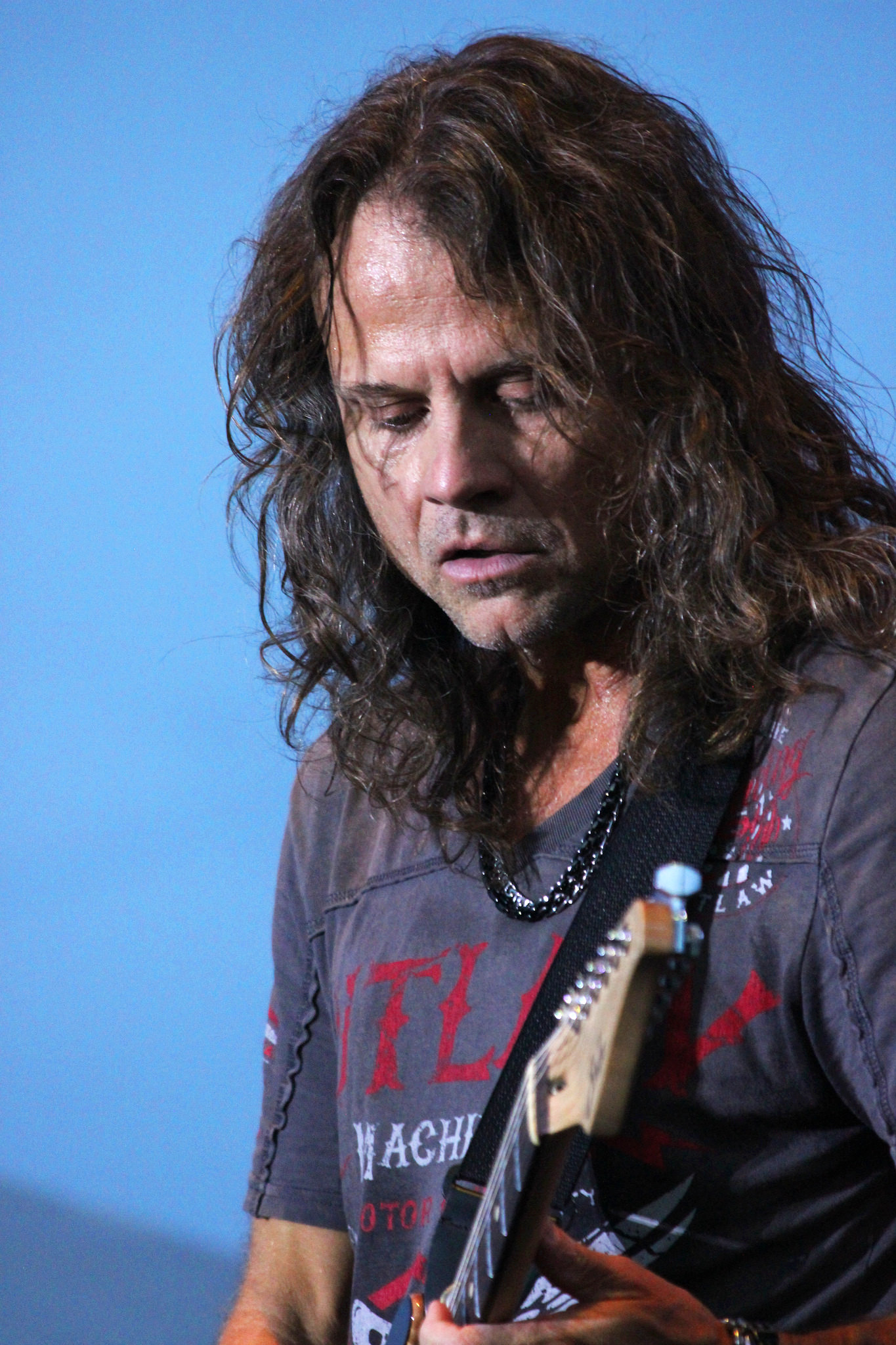

Background information
- Born: May 5, 1967 (age 59); Memphis, Tennessee, U.S.
- Genres: Rock; hard rock; glam metal; progressive metal
- Occupation: Guitarist
- Years active: 1984–present

John Roth is an American guitarist, best known for his work with the rock bands Winger, Black Oak Arkansas, Giant, Starship, and Foreigner. He has been touring and recording with national acts since the mid-1980s.

== Biography ==
Roth got his start at the age of 17 with Medieval Steel on the band's self-titled debut EP as well as in the music video for the title track. He was asked by Jim Dandy, lead vocalist of Black Oak Arkansas, to join his band as lead guitarist in 1986.

After touring the U.S. and Canada with Black Oak in the mid-1980s, Roth joined forces with Survivor's lead vocalist Jimi Jamison in 1989 to record Jamison's first solo release When Love Comes Down. The first single, "Rock Hard", co-written by Roth, was featured on the hit television series Baywatch.

After touring with Jamison in the early 1990s, Roth joined Winger in 1993 for a tour of the U.S. and Japan in support of the band's third record, Pull, as well as appearing in the band's videos "Down Incognito" and "Who's The One".

Since the 1990s, Roth has continued to tour and record with Winger on a number of projects including The Very Best of Winger, Winger IV, and the Winger Live concert DVD in 2009. The band released their 5th studio effort Karma, and by fall of 2010 has completed a tour of 19 countries supporting the release. Most recently the band has released their 6th studio album, Better Days Comin (2014), and will tour in support of. In the mid-1990s and 2000s, Roth performed live in the Memphis Mid South area with Scott Trammell (Jimi Jamison, Nelson Brothers) Kory Myers (Tom Keifer Band) and Ted Partin as the music group Tom, Dick and Harry.

In 2009, Roth joined melodic rock band Giant as lead guitarist to record their fourth studio album, Promise Land. It was released on February 26 in Europe and March 9 in the US.

In 2011, Roth joined premier Memphis Band 5th Kind, along with Kory Myers (Tom Keifer Band), Jeff Adams (Starship), Kary Baddour, and Pete Mendillo to perform in the Memphis Mid South area.

In 2012, Roth joined Starship featuring Mickey Thomas as their lead guitarist. In 2026, Roth and Starship parted ways.

In Sept-Oct 2025, Roth joined with band Foreigner featuring Louis Maldanaldo as lead singer.

== Discography ==
=== Studio albums ===
- Medieval Steel (1984)
- Jimi Jamison - When Love Comes Down (1991)
- Kip Winger - Down Incognito (1999)
- Kip Winger - Songs From The Ocean Floor (2001)
- John Roth - John Roth (2002)
- Winger - Winger IV (2006)
- Winger - Winger Live (2007)
- Winger - Karma (2009)
- Giant - Promise Land (2010)
- Winger - Better Days Coming (2014)
- Roth Brock Project - (2017)
- Giant - Shifting Time (2022)
- Winger - Seven (2023)
