= Timothy Drury =

American musician

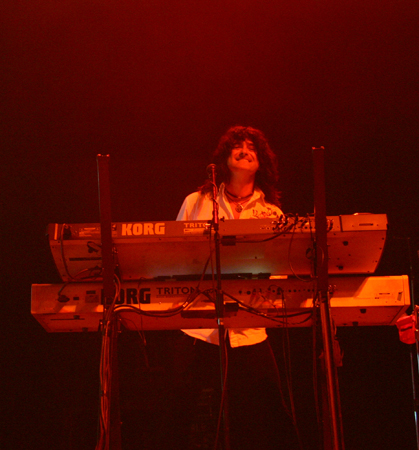
- Drury in 2008

Background information
- Born: July 5, 1961 (age 65); Los Angeles, California, U.S.
- Genres: Hard rock; blues rock; Instrumental; progressive rock
- Instruments: Keyboards; guitar; vocals
- Years active: 1989–present
- Formerly of: Don Henley; Whitesnake; Eagles; The Mob; Chris Isaak
- Website: timothydrury.com

Timothy Drury (born July 5, 1961) is an American composer, keyboardist, guitarist, vocalist, and songwriter. His breakthrough came in 1989 when Don Henley invited him to join The End of the Innocence tour as his pianist, keyboardist and backup vocalist. A few years later, he was back on tour playing keyboard, guitar and singing backup vocals with the Eagles for their "Hell Freezes Over" reunion, a tour that lasted from 1994 to 2000. He toured for seven years with the rock band Whitesnake, and with a friendly departure in September 2010, he left the band to pursue a solo career. As a composer, lyricist and songwriter, Drury has several co-writes to his credit, including music with guitarist Don Felder, formerly with the Eagles, songs with Henley and Scott F. Crago, and with Stevie Nicks and Crago.

== Biography ==
Drury was born and raised in Los Angeles, California. He is the son of actor James Drury and Cristall Orton Drury, and has an older brother, James III. His interest in music began when he was a small boy, and by the age of 5 he was taking piano lessons on a spinet piano his maternal grandmother had purchased. By the age of 11, he was writing his first songs and melodies. Through the years, he honed his skills as a writer and secured a position as a staff writer at Warner Chappell Music.

His big break in the music industry came in 1989 when he was asked to join Don Henley's ensemble as keyboardist for The End of the Innocence tour. The Chicago Tribune described the tour as a chance for Henley "to ponder the enormity of it all: life, death, love, government, deceit and a growing social malaise" and that "little was lost to The End of the Innocence's stage version, fueled by Tim Drury's piano." Following that tour, Drury worked with many other famous musicians and bands, such as the Eagles, Don Felder, Bryan Adams, Melissa Etheridge, Stevie Nicks and Whitesnake.

As a songwriter, Drury co-wrote "Everything is Different Now" with Henley and Scott F. Crago. It was included on the album Inside Job which was released in May 2000, and debuted at No. 7 on the Billboard 200. At the time, it was Henley's highest-charting album. He later co-wrote together with Stevie Nicks and Crago, the single "That Made Me Stronger," sung by Nicks. The song is included on Nicks' 2001 album Trouble in Shangri-La.

Drury released a self-titled album in 1996. He also released an instrumental record, "the Crossing" under the band name Corridor in 2004.

Drury was a member of supergroup The Mob featuring Doug Pinnick of King's X, Reb Beach of Winger and Whitesnake, Kip Winger, and Kelly Keagy of Night Ranger. The Mob released a self-titled album in 2005.

Drury toured as a member of Whitesnake on their extensive world tour to promote their record, Good to Be Bad. He performed on their 2011 album Forevermore. He toured as a keyboardist for Don Felder and performed on Felder's 2012 record, Road to Forever, and co-wrote nine of the songs on that album.
