= Can't Get Enuff =

Single by Winger

from the album In the Heart of the Young
- B-side: "In The Day We'll Never See"
- Released: July 1990
- Genre: Glam metal
- Length: 4:19
- Label: Atlantic
- Songwriters: Kip Winger, Reb Beach
- Producer: Beau Hill

Winger singles chronology
"Hungry" (1989)	"Can't Get Enuff" (1990)	"Miles Away" (1990)

"Can't Get Enuff" is a single by American rock band Winger from their 1990 album In the Heart of the Young.

Written by frontman Kip Winger and guitarist Reb Beach, "Can't Get Enuff" was the first single from the band's second album, debuting on the U.S. charts in July 1990. The song's music video, directed by Michael Bay, received heavy rotation at MTV and the up-tempo rocker was Winger's most successful track at rock radio, where it peaked at #6 on the Billboard Mainstream Rock Tracks chart. The song was also a moderate pop hit, narrowly missing the Top 40 to peak at #42 on the Hot 100 at the end of September. During this single's chart run, the album In the Heart of the Young was certified Gold by the RIAA. According to Kip Winger, the song was a late addition to the track listing, written because it was felt that there were not enough rock songs on the album. "Easy Come Easy Go" came about the same way.

In 2007, two more versions of the song were released; the original demo version recorded by the band can be heard on the Cleopatra Records album Demo Anthology, and a live version appears on the Frontiers Records release Winger Live.

== Music video ==
The song's music video was commercially released on a 1990 VHS shortform video collection, In the Heart of the Young, Vol. 1, which also featured the clip for successive single "Miles Away". The album and single version of "Can't Get Enuff" can also be heard on the band's greatest hits album, The Very Best of Winger (Atlantic/Rhino 2001).

Howard Johnson writing for Classic Rock ranked the song's video at No. 7 on their list of The Top 10 Best Hair Metal Videos.

It was directed by Michael Bay.

== Charts ==
Chart (1990)	Peak position
Canada Top Singles (RPM)	84
US Billboard Hot 100	42
US Mainstream Rock (Billboard)	6
