= Naked Sun =

Naked Sun may refer to:

- Naked Sun (film), a 1958 Japanese film
- The Naked Sun, a 1957 novel by Isaac Asimov
- "The Naked Sun" (song), by Pandora, 1995
- "Naked Sun", a song by ...And You Will Know Us by the Trail of Dead from So Divided, 2006

== See also ==
- "Naked Son", a song by Kip Winger from This Conversation Seems Like a Dream, 1996
- Naked in the Sun, a 1957 American film
