= Songs from the Ocean Floor =

Songs From The Ocean Floor

Studio album by Kip Winger
- Released: 2001
- Recorded: At Rising Sun Studios, Santa Fe, 1998–1999
- Genre: Progressive rock; ambient; electronic; symphonic rock
- Length: 54:40
- Label: Meadowlark Music
- Producer: Kip Winger

Kip Winger chronology
Down Incognito (1999)	Songs From The Ocean Floor (2001)	From the Moon to the Sun (2008)

Songs from the Ocean Floor is the third solo studio album by American rock musician Kip Winger. The album was released in 2001. According to Kip, the lead track "Cross" is an extremely personal song and he opens every solo show with it.

== Track listing ==
1. "Cross" (Kip Winger) – 4:51
2. "Crash The Wall" (Winger, Noble Kime) – 3:31
3. "Sure Was A Wildflower" (Winger) – 4:52
4. "Two Lovers Stand" (Winger) – 4:22
5. "Landslide" (Winger, Kime) – 5:14
6. "Faster (Winger, Kime) – 2:50
7. "Song Of Midnight" (Winger, Kime) – 4:49
8. "Free" (Winger) – 3:47
9. "Only One Word" (Winger) – 5:09
10. "Broken Open" (Winger, Kime) – 5:39
11. "Resurrection" (Winger, Kime) – 5:16
12. "Everything You Need" (Winger) – 4:15
13. "Headed For A Heartbreak" (Live) – 5:53 (Japanese Bonus Track)

== Musicians ==
- Kip Winger – vocals, steel-string guitar, bass guitar, keyboards
- Andy Timmons – guitars, ebow
- John Roth – guitars
- Rod Morgenstein – drums
- Ken Mary – drums
- Pat Mastelotto – drums
- Robby Rothschild – percussion
- Mark Clark – percussion
- Paula De Tuillio – backing vocals
- Frank Medina – backing vocals
- Moon Zappa – vocals on "Sure Was a Wildflower"
- Dweezil Zappa – guitar
- Jonathan Arthur – vocals on "Landslide"
- Reb Beach – guitar solo on "Resurrection"
- David Felberg – violin
- Elena Sopoci – violin
- Joe Zoeckler – violin
- Anne Martin – viola
- Joan Zucker – cello
- Mark Tatum – double bass

== Album credits ==
- Produced, engineered, arranged and mixed by Kip Winger
- Recorded at Rising Sun Studios, Santa Fe, 1998–1999
- Editing by Phil Jackson and Greg DeAngelo
- Mastered by Paul Blakemore
- Photography by Chris Corey
- Cover design by Pete Cotutsca

== See also ==
- Winger
