= This Conversation Seems Like a Dream =

Studio album by Kip Winger
- Released: 1997
- Recorded: At Rising Sun Studios, Santa Fe, NM
- Genre: Pop; soft rock; acoustic rock; funk rock
- Length: 53:07
- Label: Domo Records
- Producer: Kip Winger

Kip Winger chronology
This Conversation Seems Like a Dream (1997)	Down Incognito (1999)

This Conversation Seems Like a Dream was the first solo album by American rock artist Kip Winger. The album was released by Domo Records in 1997. A limited edition bonus disc was included with the Japanese release of the album, which also featured alternate cover art.

== Track listing ==
1. "Kiss of Life" (Kip Winger, Noble Kime) – 4:23
2. "Monster" (Winger) – 5:47
3. "Endless Circles" (Winger, Joel Tippie) – 5:31
4. "Angel of the Underground" (Winger, Andy Timmons, Kime) – 5:37
5. "Steam" (Winger, Paul Winger) – 3:58
6. "I'll Be Down (Winger, Kime) – 4:33
7. "Naked Son" (Winger) – 3:56
8. "Daniel" (Winger) – 4:18
9. "How Far Will We Go?" (Winger) – 4:45
10. "Don't Let Go" (Winger) – 4:44
11. "Here" (Winger) – 5:20

Limited Edition Japanese-Only Bonus Disc

1. "Kiss of Life" (Demo) – 5:00
2. "Monster" (Demo) – 4:37
3. "Free" (Instrumental) – 3:47 otherwise unreleased track
4. "Headed for a Heartbreak" (Demo 1987) – 4:58
5. "Hour of Need" (Demo) – 4:54
6. "Now and Forever" – 4:52 otherwise unreleased track

== Personnel ==
- Kip Winger – vocals, guitars, bass guitar, keyboards, sound effects, mandolin
- Andy Timmons – guitars
- Marc Sculman – guitars
- Rich Kern – guitars
- Rod Morgenstein – drums
- Robby Rothschild – Percussion
- Mark Clark – Percussion
- Alan Pasqua – piano
- Noble Kime – piano
- Greta Rose – backing vocals
- Beatrice Winger – backing vocals
- Paul Winger – backing vocals
- Nate Winger – backing vocals
- Pete Cotutsca – sound effects
- Jordan Rudess – announcer voice on "Ill Be Down"
- Jonathan Arthur – flute
- Chris Botti – trumpet
- Adam Gonzalez – cello
- David Felberg – violin, viola
- Willy Sucre – strings
- Jonathan Amerding – strings

== Album credits ==
- Produced and engineered by Kip Winger
- 2nd Engineer, Computer/Midi Technician: Pete Cotutsca
- Mixed by Mike Shipley, except "Daniel" mixed by Kip Winger
- Recorded and mixed at Rising Sun Studios, Santa Fe, NM
- Mastered by Doug Sax and Gavin Lurssen at The Mastering Lab
- All arrangements by Kip Winger, except "I'll Be Down", "Naked Son" by Kip Winger and Noble Kime, "Endless Circles" by Kip Winger and Pete Cotutsca
- All string arrangements by Kip Winger
- Cover art and design by Beatrice Richter-Winger
- Cover photography by Chris Corrie

== See also ==
- Winger
