= Where Will You Go =

Where Will You Go may refer to:

- "Where Will You Go", a song by Babyface on his 1989 album Tender Lover
- "Where Will You Go", a song by KWS on their 1992 album KWS
- "Where Will You Go", a song by Evanescence on their 2000 demo album Origin
- "Where Will You Go", a song by Ace Young on his 2008 album Ace Young
- "Where Will You Go", a song by Kip Winger on his 2008 album From the Moon to the Sun
- "Kahan Pe Meri Jaan Jaogi" (lit. 'Where Will You Go My Love'), a song by Adnan Sami and Pamela Jain from the 2003 Indian film Calcutta Mail
