= The Other Side of Mars =

Studio album by Mick Mars
- Released: February 23, 2024
- Genre: Grunge; hard rock
- Length: 39:09
- Label: 1313, MRI
- Producer: Michael Wagener

Singles from The Other Side of Mars
- 1. "Loyal to the Lie" Released: October 31, 2023; 2. "Right Side of Wrong" Released: December 13, 2023; 3. "Undone" Released: January 25, 2024

The Other Side of Mars is the solo debut album by former Mötley Crüe guitarist Mick Mars. It was released on February 23, 2024, by Mars' label 1313, LLC, and MRI. It was recorded in Nashville by producer Michael Wagener with a band including Jacob Bunton, Paul Taylor and Ray Luzier.

The album came on the back of Mars' exit from Crüe in 2022, after retiring from touring in the band due to his ongoing battle with ankylosing spondylitis, and amidst a lawsuit he filed against the band in 2023.

Mars named the album after his intention to show a different side to himself as a musician, though critics didn't see the difference. The album, consisting of grunge and hard rock, was praised by critics, especially for the inclusion of Bunton's lead vocals.

== Background and release ==
The Other Side of Mars is Mars' solo debut, though he had previously said he would release a solo EP in a March 2014 interview with Eddie Trunk. Prior to the album's announcement, it was discussed by Jacob Bunton in 2020 and teased by Paul Taylor and Carmine Appice in 2022.

On October 26, 2022, Mötley Crüe announced that Mars was retiring from touring due to his struggle with ankylosing spondylitis; he would remain a member of the band while being replaced on the road by John 5. However, the announcement of John 5's joining the band came with a statement which read as if Mars was out of the band entirely; former Crüe vocalist John Corabi commented that he believed Mars was forced out.

The following April, Mars filed a lawsuit against the band, claiming that he was forced out of the band after deciding to retire from touring, and that his profit share was reduced from 25 percent to 5. In an interview with Rolling Stone published in June, Mars elaborated on the lawsuit and accused Crüe bassist Nikki Sixx of faking playing his instrument with a prerecorded track playing. He also discussed the album, then called Another Side of Mars, saying the song "Killing Breed" is about "narcissists that keep you pinned down and make you feel crazy", and said he wouldn't be touring for it. The lawsuit was won by the band in 2026, with federal judge Patrick J. Walsh ruling that they were within their right to dismiss Mars.

The album was officially announced on October 31, 2023, set for release on February 23, 2024, by Mars' label 1313, LLC, and MRI. The announcement came with the release of lead single "Loyal to the Lie" and a music video. Per Mars, the album's name refers to the two different sides of his style of guitar playing, "the Mötley side and the Mars side". On December 13, Mars released the second single, "Right Side of Wrong". The third single, "Undone", was released on January 25, 2024.

== Writing and recording ==
The album was mostly written by Mars, Jacob Bunton, and Winger keyboardist Paul Taylor, who also plays on the album. It was produced by Michael Wagener, who was the mixing engineer on Mötley Crüe's 1981 debut album Too Fast for Love, and recorded in Nashville, Tennessee, where both Mars and Wagener live. The album's lineup consists of Mars on guitar; Korn drummer Ray Luzier; bassist Chris Collier, who also mixed and mastered the album; and lead vocalist Bunton, though Brion Gamboa sings lead on "Undone" and "Killing Breed".

Two songs which do not appear on the album, "Gimme Blood" and "Shake the Cage", were sung by John Corabi, recorded circa 2016. However, Mars shelved both songs, explaining that due to an unnamed third party, "The songs were wrong, parts in there that shouldn't be there, and blah, blah, blah. It isn't a long story, but it was kind of like, 'That ain't gonna fly.'"

== Style ==
The album has been called grunge and hard rock. Though Mars stated ahead of the album that his intention was to show a different aspect of himself musically, Mars' guitar playing is mostly in the same riff-heavy style as Mötley Crüe. The album distinguishes itself from Crüe through the addition of violas, violins, and keyboards to the mix.

== Reception ==
The Other Side of Mars ratings
Review scores
Source	Rating
Classic Rock	8/10 stars
Metal Injection	8/10
Sputnikmusic	4.2/5

Metal Injection's Jeff Podoshen wrote that he could "say without any hesitation whatsoever that The Other Side of Mars is the strongest play in any of the Crüe solo projects." Ultimate Classic Rock's Michael Gallucci wrote that Mars "does little to distinguish the album from most faceless hard-rock records released over the past 20 years." Classic Rock's Geoff Barton called the album a "would-be classic" and a "full-scale solo stormer". Sputnikmusic's Simon K. called the record "Mars' heaviest project hitherto", and said that his "creativity hasn't waned an iota."

Critics especially praised the selection of Bunton as vocalist, with Gallucci calling him a "more polished singer than Vince Neil" and Podoshen noting that songs like "Right Side of Wrong" wouldn't have worked vocally with Neil singing. However, Gallucci also said that the inclusion of Gamboa on two tracks "adds to the unfocused nature" of the album.

== Track listing ==
All tracks are written by Mick Mars, Jacob Bunton, and Paul Taylor, except where noted.

The Other Side of Mars track listing
No.	Title	Writer(s)	Length
1.	"Loyal to the Lie"		3:52
2.	"Broken on the Inside"		3:23
3.	"Alone"		4:55
4.	"Killing Breed"	Mars; Taylor	5:45
5.	"Memories"		3:38
6.	"Right Side of Wrong"		3:14
7.	"Ready to Roll"		3:11
8.	"Undone"	Mars; Taylor	4:39
9.	"Ain't Going Back"		2:50
10.	"LA Noir"	Mars	3:42
Total length:			39:09

== Personnel ==
- Mick Mars – guitar
- Paul Taylor – keyboards, guitar
- Jacob Bunton – lead vocals, violin
- Brion Gamboa – lead vocals (4, 8)
- Ray Luzier – drums
- Chris Collier – bass, mixing and mastering engineer
- Michael Wagener – producer, engineer

== Charts ==
Chart performance for The Other Side of Mars
Chart (2024)	Peak position
Australian Physical Albums (ARIA)	29
Scottish Albums (OCC)	59
UK Album Downloads (OCC)	37
UK Independent Albums (OCC)	40
UK Rock & Metal Albums (OCC)	14
