= Karma (Winger album) =

Studio album by Winger
- Released: October 16, 2009
- Studios: Rising Sun Studio, Santa Fe, New Mexico
- Genres: Heavy metal; hard rock
- Length: 42:40
- Label: Frontiers
- Producer: Kip Winger

Winger chronology
Winger Live (2007)	Karma (2009)	Better Days Comin' (2014)

Professional ratings
Review scores
Source	Rating
Classic Rock	8/10 stars
Hard Rock Hideout	8/10 stars

Karma is the fifth studio album by American rock band Winger. It was released on October 16, 2009, in Europe and October 27, 2009, in the United States.

== Background ==
The inspiration for a new Winger came about at the end of 2008, when frontman Kip Winger had the vision to meld the more commercial, heavier and song-oriented approach of the first two albums with the more "thinking-man" approach of the last two studio records. Kip Winger said of the title that "We were discussing the very interesting path the band has had and we have all been through so much together. So we went for Karma as this is a word that truly sums up the experience of being in the band."

When questioned about the album, Kip Winger stated: "When the chance came up to do a new Winger record, I envisioned an upbeat totally rocking record that was a cross between the first Winger album and Pull. So Reb and I sat down and wrote all the music in a month or so. I worked for six months to finish it in the classic Winger style."

In August 2009, Reb Beach wrote on his website that "Anyway, Kip and I have started the fifth Winger record, and I think you all are going to be so happy with it. I fly to Nashville next week to finish the guitars. It's very up-tempo, Mötley Crüe-ish stuff. The tunes are, you know, party, good time, bang your head stuff. It has the elements of being the best Winger record yet, so we'll see. I did the best solo of my career on the outro of a 'Headed for a Heartbreak' type song, that I know! It's two minutes long!!".

== Track listing ==
No.	Title	Writer(s)	Length
1.	"Deal with the Devil"	Kip Winger, Reb Beach, Donnie Purnell	3:00
2.	"Stone Cold Killer"	K. Winger, Beach	2:45
3.	"Big World Away"	K. Winger, Beach	3:50
4.	"Come a Little Closer"	K. Winger, Beach	2:50
5.	"Pull Me Under"	K. Winger, Beach, Dann Huff	3:20
6.	"Supernova"	K. Winger, Beach, Paula Jane Winger	6:17
7.	"Always Within Me"	K. Winger	4:15
8.	"Feeding Frenzy"	K. Winger, Beach, P. J. Winger	3:00
9.	"After All This Time"	K. Winger, Beach, John Roth	6:24
10.	"Witness"	K. Winger, Beach	6:59

European release bonus track
No.	Title	Writer(s)	Length
11.	"First Ending" (instrumental)	Rod Morgenstein	2:07

== Personnel ==
Winger

- Kip Winger – vocals, bass, keyboards, producer, engineer, mixing
- Reb Beach – guitars, vocals
- John Roth – guitars, vocals
- Rod Morgenstein – drums, piano on "First Ending"

Additional musicians

- Michael Chapdelaine – guitar on "First Ending"

Production

- Pete Cotutsca, Arthur Sloatman – additional engineering

== Sources ==
- Frontiers Records
- wingertheband.com sound samples from the album.
