= From the Moon to the Sun =

Studio album by Kip Winger
- Released: 28 October 2008
- Recorded: 2008
- Genre: Progressive rock, symphonic rock
- Length: 56:03
- Label: Frontiers
- Producer: Kip Winger, Cenk Eroglu

Kip Winger chronology
Songs from the Ocean Floor (2001)	From the Moon to the Sun (2008)

Professional ratings
Review scores
Source	Rating
Allmusic	3.5/5 stars
RevelationZ	7.5/10 stars

From the Moon to the Sun is the fourth solo studio album by American rock musician Kip Winger. It was released in 2008.

== Track listing ==
1. "Every Story Told" - 4:28
2. "Nothing" - 3:21
3. "Where Will You Go" - 3:55
4. "Pages and Pages" - 6:45
5. "Ghosts" - 5:43
6. "In Your Eyes Another Life" - 3:52
7. "Runaway" - 5:24
8. "California" - 3:59
9. "What We Are" - 3:30
10. "One Big Game" - 3:46
11. "Why" - 6:42
12. "Reason to Believe" - 4:32

=== Bonus tracks ===
1. "Monster" [Remix] (European bonus track)
2. "Holy Man (A Prayer for Darrell Lance Abbott)" (Japanese bonus track)

== Album credits ==
- Produced, engineered, arranged and mixed by Kip Winger

== See also ==
- Winger
