= Easy Come Easy Go (Winger song) =

Single by Winger

from the album In the Heart of the Young
- B-side: "You Are the Saint, I Am the Sinner"
- Released: July 1990 (UK); February 1991 (US)
- Recorded: 1990
- Genre: Hard rock, glam metal
- Length: 4:03
- Label: Atlantic
- Songwriter: Kip Winger
- Producer: Beau Hill

Winger singles chronology
"Miles Away" (1990)	"Easy Come Easy Go" (1990)	"Down Incognito" (1993)

"Easy Come Easy Go" is a song by American rock band Winger from their second studio album, In the Heart of the Young. Released in 1990, the single charted at number 41. According to frontman Kip Winger, the song was a late addition to the track listing, written because it was felt that there were not enough rock songs on the album. "Can't Get Enuff" came about the same way.

The song was a minor pop hit, peaking at number 41 on the Billboard Hot 100. The song had more rock success, peaking at number 17 on the Album Rock Tracks chart.

== Track listing ==
American CD single

No.	Title	Length
1.	"Easy Come Easy Go" (Edited Remix)	3:31
2.	"Easy Come Easy Go" (Remix)	4:02

European CD single

No.	Title	Length
1.	"Easy Come Easy Go" (Remix Edit)	3:31
2.	"Madalaine" (Live)	3:44
3.	"You Are the Saint, I Am the Sinner"	3:35

7" single

Side A
No.	Title	Length
1.	"Easy Come Easy Go" (Remix)	3:31

Side B
No.	Title	Length
1.	"You Are the Saint, I Am the Sinner"	3:30

== Personnel ==
- Kip Winger – lead vocals, bass
- Reb Beach – lead guitar, backing vocals
- Paul Taylor – rhythm guitar, backing vocals
- Rod Morgenstein – drums

== Charts ==
Chart (1991)	Peak position
Canada Top Singles (RPM)	80
US Billboard Hot 100	41
US Mainstream Rock (Billboard)	17
