= Stone Cold Queen: A Tribute =

Compilation album by Various artists
- Released: 2001
- Genre: Various
- Label: Shrapnel Records
- Producer: Bob Kulick; Bruce Bouillet

Stone Cold Queen: A Tribute is a Queen tribute album. It features various covers of Queen songs by various artists. Some songs relied on backing tracks provided by an unnamed "house band" put together by producer Bob Kulick, who also contributed rhythm guitar and bass tracks to the album. Many of the listed guitarists provided only guitar solos for the songs.

== Track listing ==
1. Stone Cold Crazy - 3:38 - Mercury, May, Deacon, Taylor (Vocals - Robin Zander; Guitars - Steve Stevens; Bass - Billy Sheehan; Drums - Matt Sorum)
2. Play the Game - 4:57 - Mercury (Vocals - Mickey Thomas; Guitars - Marty Friedman; Bass - Chuck Wright)
3. Fat Bottomed Girls - 4:26 - May (Vocals - Joe Lynn Turner; Guitars - Reb Beach; Bass - Tony Franklin)
4. Somebody to Love - 4:45 - Mercury (Vocals - Geoff Tate; Guitars - Doug Aldrich; Bass - Carmine Rojas; Drums - Aynsley Dunbar)
5. Crazy Little Thing Called Love - 3:08 - Mercury (Vocals - Matthew Nelson & Gunnar Nelson; Guitars - Albert Lee; Bass - Mike Porcaro; Drums - Pat Torpey)
6. Fight From The Inside - 3:52 - Taylor (Vocals - Jack Blades; Guitars - Jake E. Lee)
7. You're My Best Friend - 3:09 - Deacon (Vocals - Jason Scheff; Guitars - Richie Kotzen; Bass - Marco Mendoza; Drums - Vinny Appice)
8. I'm In Love With My Car - 3:44 - Taylor (Vocals - Kip Winger; Guitars - Steve Lukather; Bass - Phil Soussan; Drums - Frankie Banali)
9. Killer Queen - 3:30 - Mercury (Vocals - Glenn Hughes; Guitars - Pat Thrall; Bass - Stu Hamm; Drums - Carmine Appice)
10. Spread Your Wings - 4:45 - Deacon (Vocals - Tommy Shaw; Guitars - Dweezil Zappa; Keyboards/Piano - Derek Sherinian; Bass - Tim Bogert; Drums - Steve Ferrone)
11. We Will Rock You - 3:28 - May (Vocals - Jack Russell; Guitars - Bruce Kulick; Bass - Jeff Pilson; Drums - Mikkey Dee)
