= Come On, Feel It =

Studio album by Baumer
- Released: August 30, 2005
- Recorded: Archer Avenue Studios (Columbia, SC)
- Genre: Indie rock, pop rock, electronic rockindietronica
- Length: 34:55
- Label: Astro Magnetics
- Producer: Baumer

Baumer chronology
Family of Geniuses (2004)	Come On, Feel It (2005)	Were It Not for You (2008)

Professional ratings
Review scores
Source	Rating
Allmusic	3/5 stars

Come On, Feel It is the first studio album by the American pop/rock band Baumer, released on August 30, 2005. It is the follow-up to their first self-produced album, Family of Geniuses.

== Track listing ==
All songs written by Baumer

No.	Title	Length
1.	"How The West 1"	4:08
2.	"Turn Up The Good"	2:53
3.	"Come On, Feel It"	2:52
4.	"Denouement"	3:40
5.	"Take What's Mine"	3:05
6.	"Baumer Vs, The Red Baron"	0:27
7.	"Do The Choo Choo"	3:54
8.	"All In"	3:03
9.	"Perfect Day"	3:17
10.	"Boss Level"	0:30
11.	"Not Done With You Yet"	2:39
12.	"Exceptional Affair"	4:24

== Personnel ==
=== Band ===
- Nate Boykin – Vocals, synth
- Chris Corley – Bass
- Kenny McWilliams – Guitar
- Caleb Weathersby – Drums

=== Production ===
- Baumer – Producer
- Greg Davis – Additional engineering, bass on track 5
- Mike Shipley – Mixer
- Brad Blackwood – Mastering
- Greg Edgerton – Art Direction
- Kyle Kraszewski – Art Direction
- Bo Streeter – Photography
