= In the Heart of the Young =

Studio album by Winger
- Released: July 24, 1990
- Recorded: 1989–1990
- Studios: The Enterprise, Burbank, California
- Genres: Glam metal; hard rock; progressive rock
- Length: 43:35
- Label: Atlantic
- Producer: Beau Hill

Winger chronology
Winger (1988)	In the Heart of the Young (1990)	Pull (1993)

Singles from In the Heart of the Young
- 1. "Can't Get Enuff" Released: July 1990 (US); 2. "Easy Come Easy Go" Released: July 1990 (UK); 3. "Miles Away" Released: October 1990

Professional ratings
Review scores
Source	Rating
AllMusic	3/5 stars
Robert Christgau	C−

In the Heart of the Young (also known as Winger II) is the second studio album by the American rock band Winger. Produced by Beau Hill, it was released by Atlantic Records in 1990. Although coming out at the decline of the glam metal scene in the U.S., the release was a commercial success, prompting additional touring by the group. It was the last album with guitarist/keyboardist Paul Taylor until 2023's Seven.

The album was certified platinum and produced such hits as "Can't Get Enuff", "Easy Come Easy Go" and "Miles Away", the latter reaching the Top 20 in the Billboard's single chart. According to Kip Winger, "Can't Get Enuff" and "Easy Come Easy Go" were late additions to the track listing, written because it was felt there were not enough rock songs on the album. The album itself peaked at #15 at the album chart.

Winger followed the release of the album with a 13-month world tour, playing with other heavy metal groups such as Kiss, Scorpions, Extreme, Slaughter, and with hard rock group ZZ Top. A collection of music videos with the same title was released the following year in two separate VHS volumes.

Musically, In the Heart of the Young followed closely in the footsteps of the band's first album. The members, however, also made some notable changes in comparison to that, particularly given the new emphasis on both progressive rock elements and power ballads.

== Additional songs ==
At least two more songs were recorded during the In the Heart of the Young sessions, but "All I Ever Wanted" and "Never" did not make it to the final album in America, because producer Beau Hill found them too heavy for the Winger sound. Both were originally released as B-sides. "All I Ever Wanted" was later released as a bonus track on the Japanese pressings of the album, while "Never" was later released on the 2007 compilation album, Demo Anthology.

== Track listing ==
All tracks are written by Kip Winger and Reb Beach (except where noted).

No.	Title	Writer(s)	Length
1.	"Can't Get Enuff"		4:19
2.	"Loosen Up"	Winger, Beach, Paul Taylor, Rod Morgenstein	3:28
3.	"Miles Away"	Taylor	4:11
4.	"Easy Come Easy Go"	Winger	4:03
5.	"Rainbow in the Rose"		5:33
6.	"In the Day We'll Never See"	Winger, Beach, Taylor, Morgenstein	4:50
7.	"Under One Condition"		4:27
8.	"Little Dirty Blonde"	Winger, Taylor	3:31
9.	"Baptized by Fire"		4:11
10.	"You Are the Saint, I Am the Sinner"		3:35
11.	"In the Heart of the Young"	Winger	4:37

Japanese edition bonus tracks
No.	Title	Writer(s)	Length
12.	"All I Ever Wanted"	Winger, Beach, Taylor, Morgenstein	3:35
13.	"Headed for a Heartbreak" (1991 Remix)	Winger	3:36

=== Singles ===
- "Can't Get Enuff" / "In the Day We'll Never See"
- "Miles Away / "Rainbow in the Rose"
- "Easy Come Easy Go" / "You Are the Saint, I Am the Sinner"

== Personnel ==
=== Band members ===
- Kip Winger – vocals, bass, keyboards
- Reb Beach – guitars, vocals
- Rod Morgenstein – drums, percussion
- Paul Taylor – guitars, keyboards, vocals

=== Additional musicians ===
- Paul Winger – backing vocals
- Nate Winger – backing vocals
- Chris Botti – trumpet on "Rainbow in the Rose"
- Micheal Davis – trombone on "Rainbow in the Rose"

=== Album credits ===
- Produced by Beau Hill
- Recorded by Jimmy Hoyson
- Mixed by Jimmy Hoyson and Beau Hill; assisted by Martin Horenburg
- Digital editing by Dave Collins
- Mastered at Sterling Sound, New York, by Ted Jensen
- Recorded and mixed at "The Enterprise", Burbank, California

== Charts ==
Chart (1990)	Peak position
Finnish Albums (The Official Finnish Charts)	27
Japanese Albums (Oricon)	29
US Billboard 200	15

== Certifications ==
Region	Certification	Certified units/sales
Canada (Music Canada)	Gold	50,000^{^}
Japan (RIAJ)	Gold	100,000^{^}
United States (RIAA)	Platinum	1,000,000^{^}
^{^} Shipments figures based on certification alone.

== Video releases ==
The videos for "Can't Get Enuff" and "Miles Away" were made available on a 1990 VHS release entitled In the Heart of the Young, Vol. 1. It also includes "making of" segments and band interviews.

In 1991, In the Heart of the Young, Vol. 2 was released on VHS. It included promos for the videos of "Silent Night", "Easy Come Easy Go" and "You Are the Saint, I Am the Sinner", along with performance footage and band interviews. "Silent Night" was never recorded by the band for an album, and this VHS is the only official released version of the song.
