= Better Days Comin' =

Studio album by Winger
- Released: April 23, 2014
- Genre: Hard rock; heavy metal; progressive rock
- Length: 47:30
- Label: Frontiers
- Producer: Kip Winger

Winger chronology
Karma (2009)	Better Days Comin' (2014)	Seven (2023)

Professional ratings
Review scores
Source	Rating
AllMusic	3.5/5 stars
All About the Rock	8/10 stars
Front Row Report	9/10 stars
Sea of Tranquility	4.5/5 stars
Amps and Green Screens	9.5/10 stars
Rush On Rock	9/10 stars
Melodicrock.com	9.4/10 stars
Soundi.fi	4/5 stars

Better Days Comin' is the sixth studio album by American rock band Winger. It was released on April 23, 2014, debuting at #21 on the Top Current Rock Albums Chart and #85 on the Billboard 200.

== Track listing ==
All tracks are written by Kip Winger and Reb Beach except as noted.

No.	Title	Writer(s)	Length
1.	"Midnight Driver of a Love Machine"	Winger, Beach, Donnie Purnell	4:14
2.	"Queen Babylon"	Winger, Beach, Purnell	4:31
3.	"Rat Race"	Winger, Beach, Purnell	3:36
4.	"Better Days Comin'"		3:31
5.	"Tin Soldier"	Winger, Beach, Purnell	3:49
6.	"Ever Wonder"	Winger	6:52
7.	"So Long China"	Beach, John Roth, Winger, Stephanie Rachel Lewis	4:17
8.	"Storm in Me"	Beach, Roth, Winger	4:42
9.	"Be Who You Are Now"	Roth, Winger, Mark Hudson	5:11
10.	"Another Beautiful Day" (bonus track on deluxe edition with DVD)	Beach, John Goodwin, Winger	3:14
11.	"Out of This World"	Winger, Beach, Paula Winger	6:37

== Personnel ==
Winger

- Kip Winger – lead vocals, bass, acoustic guitar, keyboards
- Reb Beach – co-lead guitar, background vocals
- Rod Morgenstein – drums
- John Roth – co-lead guitar, background vocals

Additional musicians

- Cenk Eroğlu – keyboards, sound effects
- Marco Giovino – percussion
- Paula Winger – vocals

Production

- Kip Winger – producer & mixing
- Paul Blakemore – mastering
- Jason Green – video production
- Dave Hoffis – assistant engineer
- Dan Hubp – video production
- Pride Smith – artwork
- Deeandra Swabb – administration
- Andres Martinez – photograph
- Denise Truscello – band photographer
- Chris Corey – band photographer

== Charts ==
Chart (2014)	Peak position
UK Independent Albums (OCC)	30
UK Rock & Metal Albums (OCC)	10
US Billboard 200	85
US Top Hard Rock Albums (Billboard)	4
US Top Rock Albums (Billboard)	21
