= IV (Winger album) =

Studio album by Winger
- Released: October 20, 2006
- Studios: The Funky White House and Quad Studios, Nashville, Tennessee
- Genres: Hard rock; heavy metal; progressive metal
- Length: 49:52
- Label: Frontiers
- Producer: Kip Winger

Winger chronology
The Very Best of Winger (2001)	IV (2006)	Demo Anthology (2007)

Professional ratings
Review scores
Source	Rating
Allmusic	3.5/5 stars

IV is the fourth studio album by American rock band Winger, and the first since their 1993 album Pull.

== Background ==
According to frontman Kip Winger, one morning he "just woke up and heard the new Winger record" in his head, knowing just what he wanted to do with it. It was released in October 2006 on Frontiers Records. The album is the most musically progressive album of Winger's career. Lyrically, much of the album is sung from the perspective of U.S. soldiers stationed overseas. Kip Winger was inspired to do this after performing solo shows at U.S. military bases, and being touched by the stories of the soldiers he met.

The album cover, showing a U.S. soldier being watched over by angels, was drawn by comic book artist Ethan Van Sciver, known for his work at DC and Marvel Comics. Kip Winger was introduced to Van Sciver by a mutual friend in Florida.

== Honors ==
In 2009 Kip Winger was presented by U.S. General Harold Cross with an honorary plaque and U.S. flag that had flown in Iraq for the song "Blue Suede Shoes", which honors the service and sacrifice of the United States armed forces and their families.

== Track listing ==
All tracks are written by Kip Winger and Reb Beach (except where noted).

No.	Title	Writer(s)	Length
1.	"Right Up Ahead"		5:07
2.	"Blue Suede Shoes"		3:46
3.	"Four-Leaf Clover"		4:18
4.	"M16"	Kip Winger	3:57
5.	"Your Great Escape"	Kip Winger, Reb Beach, Paula Winger	3:55
6.	"Disappear"		3:49
7.	"On a Day Like Today"	Kip Winger, Reb Beach, Paula Winger	6:24
8.	"Livin' Just to Die"		3:40
9.	"Short Flight to Mexico"	Kip Winger, Reb Beach, Paula Winger	4:18
10.	"Generica"		6:33
11.	"Can't Take It Back"		4:05

Japanese edition bonus track
No.	Title	Length
12.	"Blue Suede Shoes" (Acoustic)	3:32

== Personnel ==
=== Band ===
- Kip Winger – lead vocals, bass, acoustic guitars and keyboards
- Reb Beach – co-lead guitar, background vocals
- John Roth – co-lead guitar, background vocals
- Cenk Eroğlu – keyboards, rhythm guitar
- Rod Morgenstein – drums

=== Additional personnel ===
- Denny McDonald – additional background vocals
- Paula Winger – additional background vocals

=== Production credits ===
- Produced, engineered and mixed by Kip Winger
- Additional engineers: Tony Green, Matt Abbott and John Roth
- Pro-Tools engineers: Buckley Miller and Steve Warren
- Recorded at The Funky White House, Nashville, TN and Quad Studios, Nashville, TN
- Mastered by Richard Dodd
- Cover art design: Ethan Van Sciver
- Color artist: Moose Baumann
- Layout design: Pete Cotutsca
- Photos by Mark Delong

== Sources ==
- amazon.com
- melodicrock.com
- rebbeach.com sound samples from the album.
