= Seven (Winger album) =

Studio album by Winger
- Released: May 5, 2023
- Genre: Hard rock
- Length: 56:22
- Label: Frontiers
- Producer: Kip Winger

Winger chronology
Better Days Comin' (2014)	Seven (2023)

Seven is the seventh and final studio album by American rock band Winger. It marks the return of guitarist/keyboardist Paul Taylor to the band since 1990's In the Heart of the Young. The album was preceded by the lead single "Proud Desperado". The band toured in the UK in May and the US in June 2023 in support of the album.

== Critical reception ==
Professional ratings
Review scores
Source	Rating
Classic Rock	3.5/5 stars

Writing for Classic Rock, Johnny Sharp opined that Winger "are of course well aware of what their audience wants from them and have no need to reinvent themselves" and asked "who cares when the choruses are this big?" Kris Peters of Heavy Mag wrote "musically the whole album is brilliant, with enough variations within the rock genre to keep it fresh and exuberant" and that Seven is "classic stadium rock with big hooks and accessible music, but damn isn't it good to hear again?" Rob Smith of Ultimate Classic Rock stated, "That the group has made an album as rock-solid as Seven is a testament to their collective power and virtuosity, and to the singular force that is their namesake leader." Smith concluded by writing that "If you like potent hard rock and virtuosic playing, you owe it to yourself to check out Seven".

== Track listing ==
All tracks are written by Kip Winger and Reb Beach, except as noted.

Seven track listing
No.	Title	Writer(s)	Length
1.	"Proud Desperado"	Winger, Beach, Desmond Child	3:50
2.	"Heaven's Falling"		5:15
3.	"Tears of Blood"		5:04
4.	"Resurrect Me"		4:11
5.	"Voodoo Fire"	Winger	3:59
6.	"Broken Glass"		6:52
7.	"It's Okay"		4:13
8.	"Stick the Knife in and Twist"	Winger, Beach, Grant Van Dijk	3:32
9.	"One Light to Burn"	Winger, John Roth	4:13
10.	"Do or Die"	Winger	3:54
11.	"Time Bomb"		4:20
12.	"It All Comes Back Around"	Winger	7:29

Japanese release bonus track
No.	Title	Writer(s)	Length
13.	"Proud Desperado (Acoustic)"	Winger, Beach, Child	3:57

== Personnel ==
Winger

- Kip Winger – lead vocals, bass, acoustic guitar, keyboards
- Reb Beach – co-lead guitar, background vocals
- Rod Morgenstein – drums
- John Roth – co-lead guitar, background vocals
- Paul Taylor – rhythm guitar, keyboards, background vocals

Additional musicians

- Dave Hoffis – additional vocals
- Cenk Eroğlu – additional sounds
- Tracy Silverman – violin, viola on "Proud Desperado (Acoustic)"
- Robby Rothschild – percussion on "Proud Desperado (Acoustic)"
- Steven Schumann – cello on "Proud Desperado (Acoustic)"
- JoJo Moore, Isla Lutito, Milly Mason, Alice Dominguez, Celia Dominguez – children's choir on "Proud Desperado (Acoustic)"

Production

- Kip Winger – production, engineering
- Justin Cortelou – eningeering, mixing
- Ted Jensen – mastering
- John Painter – engineering on "Proud Desperado (Acoustic)"

== Charts ==
Chart performance for Seven
Chart (2023)	Peak position
Belgian Albums (Ultratop Wallonia)	193
Japanese Albums (Oricon)	37
Japanese Hot Albums (Billboard Japan)	36
Scottish Albums (Official Charts)	56
Swiss Albums (Schweizer Hitparade)	18
UK Independent Albums (Official Charts)	13
US Top Album Sales (Billboard)	21
