= Mike Shipley =

Australian record producer (1956–2013)

Background information
- Born: Michael Shipley; 7 October 1956; Sydney, Australia
- Origin: London, England
- Died: 25 July 2013 (aged 56) Studio City, Los Angeles, United States
- Occupations: Mixing engineer; audio engineer; record producer
- Instruments: Drums; guitar
- Years active: 1976–2013

Michael Shipley (7 October 1956 – 25 July 2013) was an Australian mixing engineer, audio engineer, and record producer. He mostly worked in Los Angeles during his career of more than 30 years. At the Grammy Awards of 2012 he won the Best Engineered Album, Non-Classical for working on Paper Airplane (April 2011) by Alison Krauss and Union Station. Shipley died in July 2013, aged 56, of an apparent suicide.

== Career ==
Michael Shipley was born on 7 October 1956, in Sydney. As a teenager he moved with his family to London. He became interested in a recording career while at school in the United Kingdom in the early 1970s. He later recalled, "One of my teachers at grammar school there was a musician who asked me to come down and sing on a record he was making. I walked into this thing called the recording studio, and it just blew my mind. It was, 'This is home,' and I knew instantly and from that point on that all I wanted to do was to work there."

Shipley returned to Australia and completed secondary education at Camberwell Grammar School (class of '74) in Melbourne. He then went back to London, where he started as an assistant at Wessex Sound Studios and worked with the Sex Pistols and Queen. His first engineering sessions were during the punk rock explosion of the late 1970s and early 1980s and included recordings with the Damned. He worked alongside Robert John "Mutt" Lange for decades. Shipley's contemporaries at Wessex include producers Roy Thomas Baker and Chris Thomas, and engineers Tim Friese-Greene and Bill Price. Shipley also produced Def Leppard albums, High 'n' Dry (July 1981), Pyromania (January 1983), Hysteria (August 1987) and Adrenalize (March 1992).

Asked to work with the Cars, Shipley moved to Los Angeles in 1984. He then went to Hawaii for a sabbatical, but returned to Los Angeles to work for Def Leppard, Shania Twain, The Corrs, Anberlin, Aerosmith, Maroon 5, Faith Hill, India.Arie, Kelly Clarkson, Green Day, Nickelback, and Alison Krauss.

== Death ==
Shipley died on 25 July 2013. The cause of death, as stated on 9 August 2013 at the memorial service, was an apparent suicide.

== Discography ==
Recorded work credited to Shipley:

=== 1970s ===
Year	Artist	Title	Contribution
1978	Hawklords	25 Years On	Engineer
1979	Matchbox	Matchbox	Engineer
1979	The Damned	Machine Gun Etiquette	Engineer

=== 1980s ===
Year	Artist	Title	Contribution
1980	Planet 10	Night	Engineer
1980	Night	Long Distance	Engineer
1980	City Boy	Heads Are Rolling	Engineer, audio engineer
1980	Desmond Dekker	Black and Dekker	Engineer
1981	City Boy	It's Personal	Engineer
1981	Def Leppard	High 'n' Dry	Engineer
1982	Sniff 'n' the Tears	Ride Blue Divide	Producer, engineer, mixing engineer
1982	A Flock of Seagulls	A Flock of Seagulls	Engineer
1983	Q-Feel	Q-Feel	Engineer
1983	Def Leppard	Pyromania	Engineer
1983	Diamond Head	Canterbury	Producer, engineer, audio engineer
1984	Thomas Dolby	The Flat Earth	Mixing engineer
1984	Devo	Shout	Mixing engineer
1984	Berlin	Love Life	Mixing engineer
1984	The Cars	Heartbeat City	Mixing engineer
1985	Prefab Sprout	Steve McQueen	Audio engineer, mixing engineer
1985	Joni Mitchell	Dog Eat Dog	Producer, audio engineer, mixing engineer
1985	Kim Carnes	Barking at Airplanes	Mixing engineer
1986	Benjamin Orr	The Lace	Producer, audio engineer, mixing engineer
1986	Lone Justice	Shelter	Mixing engineer
1986	Berlin	Count Three & Pray	Mixing engineer
1987	Alison Moyet	Raindancing	Mixing engineer, associate producer
1987	Tom Petty and the Heartbreakers	Let Me Up (I've Had Enough)	Mixing engineer
1987	Def Leppard	Hysteria	Mixing engineer
1988	Scorpions	Savage Amusement	Mixing engineer
1988	Prefab Sprout	From Langley Park to Memphis	Mixing engineer
1988	Joni Mitchell	Chalk Mark in a Rain Storm	Audio engineer, mixing engineer
1989	Strangeways	Walk in the Fire	Mixing engineer

=== 1990s ===
Year	Artist	Title
1990	Vixen	Rev It Up
1990	Ratt	Detonator
1990	Cheap Trick	Busted
1991	Yes	Union
1991	Joni Mitchell	Night Ride Home
1992	Shawn Colvin	Fat City
1992	Def Leppard	Adrenalize
1993	Winger	Pull
1993	Heart	Desire Walks On
1994	Richard Marx	Paid Vacation
1995	John Waite	Temple Bar
1995	Meat Loaf	Welcome to the Neighbourhood
1995	Rodney Crowell	Jewel of the South
1996	X Japan	Dahlia
1997	Down by Law	Last of the Sharpshooters
1997	Guster	Goldfly
1997	Shania Twain	Come On Over
1997	Whitesnake	Restless Heart
1998	Kevin Sharp	Love Is
1999	David Mead	The Luxury of Time
1999	Chris Botti	Slowing Down the World
1999	Ratt	Ratt
1999	Blondie	No Exit
1999	Splender	Halfway Down the Sky
1999	Enrique Iglesias	Enrique
1999	Kip Winger	Down Incognito
1999	Faith Hill	Breathe
1999	Jimmy Barnes	Love and Fear

=== 2000s ===
Year	Artist	Title
2000	Catherine Wheel	Wishville
2000	Green Day	Warning
2000	Ronan Keating	Ronan
2000	The Corrs	In Blue
2000	Alecia Elliott	I'm Diggin' It
2000	Hoku	Hoku
2000	Poe	Haunted
2000	Evan and Jaron	Evan and Jaron
2001	Jessica Andrews	Who I Am
2001	Tim McGraw	Set This Circus Down
2001	Aerosmith	Just Push Play
2001	Andrew W.K.	I Get Wet
2001	The Go-Go's	God Bless The Go-Go's
2001	Trace Adkins	Chrome
2001	India Arie	Acoustic Soul
2001	Breaking Point	Coming of Age
2002	Shania Twain	Up!
2002	Splender	To Whom It May Concern
2002	Tim McGraw	Tim McGraw and the Dancehall Doctors
2002	Dana Glover	Testimony
2002	Maroon 5	Songs About Jane
2002	Shannon McNally	Jukebox Sparrows
2002	Taxiride	Garage Mahal
2002	Laura Pausini	From the Inside
2002	Lisa Loeb	Cake and Pie
2002	Phil Vassar	American Child
2003	Marcel	You, Me and the Windshield
2003	Boyd Tinsley	True Reflections
2003	Kelly Clarkson	Thankful
2003	Terri Clark	Pain to Kill
2003	Jessica Andrews	Now
2003	Guster	Keep It Together
2003	The Format	Interventions + Lullabies
2003	Rodney Atkins	Honesty
2003	Barenaked Ladies	Everything to Everyone
2003	Josh Groban	Closer
2004	Pat McGee Band	Save Me
2005	Jack's Mannequin	Everything in Transit
2005	Baumer	Come On, Feel It
2005	Nickelback	All the Right Reasons
2006	Rock Star Supernova	Rock Star Supernova
2006	Damone	Out Here All Night
2006	Rock Kills Kid	Are You Nervous?
2006	Clay Aiken	A Thousand Different Ways
2007	The Click Five	Modern Minds and Pastimes
2007	Lillix	Inside the Hollow
2007	Anberlin	Cities
2007	Fuel	Angels & Devils
2007	Motel	17
2008	Blessed by a Broken Heart	Pedal to the Metal
2008	Candlebox	Into the Sun
2008	Nickelback	Dark Horse
2009	Thirty Seconds to Mars	This Is War
2009	Papa Roach	Metamorphosis

=== 2010s ===
Year	Artist	Title
2010	Maroon 5	Hands All Over
2010	Planet of the Stereos	How To Make A Telescope
2010	Sing It Loud	Everything Collide
2011	Runner Runner	Runner Runner
2011	Alison Krauss and Union Station	Paper Airplane
2011	Thomas Dolby	A Map of the Floating City
2012	12 Stones	Beneath the Scars
2013	Keith Urban	Fuse
