= Down Incognito (song) =

Single by Winger

from the album Pull
- B-side: "Like A Ritual"
- Released: May 8, 1993
- Genre: Hard rock
- Length: 3:49
- Label: Atlantic
- Songwriters: Kip Winger; Reb Beach
- Producer: Mike Shipley

Winger singles chronology
"Easy Come Easy Go" (1991)	"Down Incognito" (1993)

"Down Incognito" is a song by the American rock band Winger, released on May 18, 1993 by Atlantic Records as the only single from their third studio album, Pull (1993). The song was written by Kip Winger and Reb Beach, and produced by Mike Shipley. It reached number 15 on the US Billboard Mainstream Rock chart on June 26, and stayed there until August 14, dropping to number 33 before falling off the chart after the band was parodied on Beavis and Butt-Head.

== Critical reception ==
Larry Flick from Billboard magazine considered that "seamless harmonies during the chorus, Kip Winger's increasingly warm delivery, and slick synth fills add up to a track that is a good fit for pop and album rock formats".

== Charts ==
Chart (1993)	Peak position
US Mainstream Rock (Billboard)	15
