= The Mob (American rock band) =

American supergroup, one-off project

The Mob was a one-off project (or supergroup) consisting of Doug Pinnick, Reb Beach, Kip Winger, Kelly Keagy, and Timothy Drury. The band released one self-titled album in 2005 on Frontiers Records.

== Track listing ==
All tracks written by Reb Beach, Kip Winger, and Doug Pinnick except as indicated.

1. "One Track Mind" – 4:20
2. "Wait" – 4:38
3. "The Magic" – 4:31
4. "I Will Follow" – 4:34
5. "Guitar Solo" (Beach) – 1:21
6. "Never Get Enough" – 4:51
7. "Love Will Carry On" – 4:23
8. "Turn To Stone" – 3:54
9. "No Reasons Why" – 3:23
10. "Spaghetti Western" (Beach) – 3:20
11. "I Want To Live Forever" – 3:37

== Personnel ==
- Reb Beach – guitars, backing vocals
- Doug Pinnick – lead vocals
- Kip Winger – bass guitar, backing vocals
- Kelly Keagy – drums, backing vocals, lead vocals on "The Magic"
- Timothy Drury – keyboards, backing vocals

== Album credits ==
- Produced by Kip Winger
- Engineered by Joseph Rusineck and Kip Winger
- Logo design by Carl-Andrè Beckston
- Artwork by Giulio Cataldo
