= Seventeen (Winger song) =

Single by Winger

from the album Winger
- B-side: "Poison Angel"
- Released: February 1989
- Studio: Atlantic Studios, New York City
- Genre: Glam metal
- Length: 4:05; 4:47 (Extended version in the Rock Band 4 DLC)
- Label: Atlantic
- Songwriter(s): Kip Winger, Reb Beach, Beau Hill
- Producer(s): Beau Hill, Roy Moore

Winger singles chronology
"Madalaine" (1988)	"Seventeen" (1989)	"Headed for a Heartbreak" (1989)

"Seventeen" is a single by American rock band Winger from their debut album Winger. Released in 1989, the song charted at No. 26 on the Billboard Hot 100. The song was named the 87th best hard rock song of all time by VH1.

The B-side for this single was the album cut "Poison Angel".

== Background ==
According to Kip Winger, he took inspiration from the Beatles song "I Saw Her Standing There", which contains the lyric, "Well she was just seventeen / If you know what I mean / And the way she looked / Was way beyond compare" and was not aware that age seventeen is underage in some jurisdictions.

Winger said guitarist Reb Beach wrote the main riff when he was about 15, but was unsure how to use it. However, Winger had an idea, and wove it into the song. He said they were trying to rip off a Led Zeppelin song with "weird syncopation" on the verse, though he cannot remember which song it was anymore — probably "The Crunge" or "Walter's Walk". He also stated, "The thing I like about 'Seventeen' is that time and time again I've seen cover bands try to play it and there's no one I've ever seen be able to play that riff correctly. That song is very deceiving because it's cocky on the melody end and it's musically a difficult song for average bands to play, because it's all this intricate picking and a lot of riffs and syncopations and singing and playing that song has always been a challenge."

== Track listing ==
7" and cassette single

Side A
No.	Title	Length
1.	"Seventeen"	4:02

Side B
No.	Title	Length
1.	"Poison Angel"	3:22

Canadian 7" single

Side A
No.	Title	Length
1.	"Seventeen" (Radio Edit)	3:35

Side B
No.	Title	Length
1.	"Poison Angel"	3:22

CD single

No.	Title	Length
1.	"Seventeen" (Radio Edit)	3:35
2.	"Seventeen" (LP Version)	4:04

== Charts ==
Chart (1989)	Peak position
US Billboard Hot 100	26
US Mainstream Rock (Billboard)	19

== See also ==
- List of glam metal albums and songs
