= Hungry (Winger song) =

Single by Winger

from the album Winger
- B-side: "Time to Surrender"
- Released: September 1989
- Genre: Glam metal
- Length: 3:58
- Label: Atlantic
- Songwriter(s): Kip Winger, Reb Beach
- Producer(s): Beau Hill

Winger singles chronology
"Headed for a Heartbreak" (1988)	"Hungry" (1989)	"Can't Get Enuff" (1990)

"Hungry" is a song by American rock band Winger from their debut album Winger. Released as a single in 1989, the song charted at No. 85 in the US. The B-side was "Time to Surrender", taken from the same album. A music video was released which dealt with a man falling into a depression after his new wife dies in a car crash. In the beginning of the music video, before the car crashes, the song "Headed for a Heartbreak" can be heard playing on the radio.

== Charts ==
Chart (1989)	Peak position
US Billboard Hot 100	85
US Mainstream Rock (Billboard)	34
