= Baumer (band) =

- Origin: Columbia, South Carolina, USA
- Genres: New wave, indie rock
- Years active: 2003–2008
- Labels: Astro Magnetics; Eyeball Records
- Members: Nate Boykin; Josh Kean; Kenny McWilliams; Chad Rochester

Baumer was an American indie rock band from Columbia, South Carolina. Their debut album Come on Feel It was released in 2005 and their follow up Were It Not For You was released on March 4, 2008. Baumer was also featured on the Starbucks Hear Music album Off the Clock.

On November 7, 2008, the band officially broke up, and played their last show in their hometown of Columbia, SC. Special burned discs entitled 'Never Say Die' which included 13 various acoustic songs, remixes, and even brand new tracks were given out to honor those that had supported Baumer along their journey.

On February 2, 2010, the band apparently announced in a bulletin that they were getting back together. However, this was revealed to be a hoax posted when someone hacked into the band's Myspace page.

The remaining members of Baumer have gone on to form the band The Internet, which released an EP On the Brink or Bust in November 2010. Kenny McWilliams and Chad Rochester, as of June 2024, continue to play music together in the bands Rejectioneers and real work.

== Discography ==
- Family of Geniuses (Self-release, 2004)
- Come On, Feel It (Astro Magnetics, 2005)
- Come on, Feel It Reissue (Eyeball Records, 2006)
- Were It Not For You (Eyeball Records, March 4, 2008)
- Never Say Die (Self-released, 2008)

=== Other appearances ===
- Waking Life - Nicholas a. Milillo (2024) (samples title track from Were It Not For You)

== Members ==
- Nate Boykin – Lead vocals, synthesizer (2003–2008)
- Chad Rochester – vocals, lead guitar, bass, synthesizer (2005–2008)
- Kenny McWilliams – rhythm guitar (2003–2008)
- Chris Corley – bass guitar (2004–2006)
- Josh Kean – drums (2005–2008)
- Caleb Weathersby – drums (2003-2005)
