= Madalaine =

Single by Winger

from the album Winger
- B-side: "Higher and Higher"
- Released: August 1988
- Recorded: 1988
- Studio: Atlantic Studios, New York City
- Genre: Glam metal
- Length: 3:44
- Label: Atlantic
- Songwriter(s): Kip Winger, Reb Beach, Beau Hill
- Producer(s): Beau Hill

Winger singles chronology
"Madalaine" (1988)	"Seventeen" (1988)

"Madalaine" is the debut single by American rock band Winger, from their self-titled debut album Winger. Released in 1988, the song reached #27 on the Mainstream rock Billboard charts. According to Kip Winger, it was one of the first four songs he and bandmate Reb Beach wrote when they first got together, based on a handful of riffs Reb had from when he was younger. Kip figured out how best to arrange the riffs, enabling the pair to complete the song.

== Track listing ==
7" single

Side A
No.	Title	Length
1.	"Madalaine" (LP Version)	3:41

Side B
No.	Title	Length
1.	"Madalaine" (Radio Edit)	3:25

Cassette single

Side A
No.	Title	Length
1.	"Madalaine"	3:41

Side B
No.	Title	Length
2.	"Higher and Higher"	3:18

CD single

No.	Title	Length
1.	"Madalaine" (Radio Edit)	3:25
2.	"Madalaine" (LP Version)	3:41
3.	"Seventeen" (LP Version)	4:04

Promo CD single

No.	Title	Length
1.	"Madalaine" (LP Version)	3:43

== Charts ==
Chart (1988)	Peak position
US Mainstream Rock (Billboard)	27
