= Miles Away (Winger song) =

1990 single by Winger

Single by Winger

from the album In the Heart of the Young
- B-side: "All I Ever Wanted"
- Released: October 1990
- Recorded: 1990
- Genre: Hard rock, glam metal
- Length: 4:15 (album version); 4:04 (demo version)
- Label: Atlantic
- Songwriter: Paul Taylor
- Producer: Beau Hill

Winger singles chronology
"Can't Get Enuff" (1990)	"Miles Away" (1990)	"Easy Come Easy Go" (1990)

"Miles Away" is a power ballad by American rock band Winger from their album In the Heart of the Young. Released in late 1990 to pop radio after already reaching number one in most AOR markets, the song peaked at number 12 on the Hot 100 chart. It is also significant for being Winger's only ever hit single in the United Kingdom, reaching number 56 in January 1991.

The single featured a B-side, "All I Ever Wanted", that has only been released in demo form on the 2007 compilation album Demo Anthology and the 2014 remastered reissue of the album.

== Background ==
Originally written by Paul Taylor during the early '80s, he offered this song to Eric Martin (later of Mr. Big) who declined even though he knew it would be a hit. Taylor stated he wrote "Miles Away" for his girlfriend Emi Canyn who was one of the Nasty Habits, the background singers for Mötley Crüe.

== Music Video ==
The music video features Debbe Dunning (who starred as Heidi Keppert on the hit 90s sitcom Home Improvement).

== Charts ==
=== Weekly charts ===
Chart (1990–1991)	Peak position
Australia (ARIA)	151
Canada Top Singles (RPM)	44
UK Singles (Official Charts)	56
US Billboard Hot 100	12
US Mainstream Rock (Billboard)	14

=== Year-end charts ===
Chart (1991)	Position
US Billboard Hot 100	97
