= Paul Taylor (keyboardist) =

American rock musician

- Born: June 4, 1960 (age 65); California, U.S.
- Genres: Hard rock; heavy metal; glam metal; progressive metal
- Occupation: Musician
- Instruments: Keyboards; piano; guitar
- Years active: 1980–present

Paul Taylor (born June 4, 1960), formerly credited as Paul Horowitz, is an American musician, who is best known as the keyboardist/guitarist for the hard rock band Winger (1987–1992, 2001–2003, 2013–2014, 2014–2017, 2018–present). Although he is perhaps most frequently associated with Winger, Taylor has also played with numerous other prominent musicians, including future Sammy Hagar and Boston guitarist Gary Pihl (in his early days), Eric Martin (solo artist and future Mr. Big frontman), Aldo Nova, Steve Perry of Journey, Alice Cooper and Tommy Shaw.

== Biography ==
Taylor was born in California. In the late 1970s he briefly played in a Northern California band called Stark Raving Mad (Paul on lead guitar, piano and vocals, with Donovan Stark, Gary Pihl (later on with Sammy Hagar and Boston), Jay Causbrook, and David Payne, with Eric Martin (of Mr. Big). Taylor experienced his first mainstream success in the early 1980s as the touring keyboardist in Canadian musician Aldo Nova's backing band, and he appears in the music video for Nova's biggest hit, "Fantasy".

Prior to forming Winger, Taylor and Kip Winger were both playing with Alice Cooper's backing band on the tours for Cooper's mid-80s albums, Constrictor (1986) and Raise Your Fist and Yell (1987). During this time, the two began composing songs together and, while on break from touring, recorded what would become the first Winger demos. Whereas Kip left Alice's band prior to the European leg of the 1987 tour, Paul remained on board for the European dates. However, in the midst of touring Europe, Paul received a call from Kip, who had been working with future Winger lead guitarist Reb Beach recording more demos in New York, informing him that he had gotten a record deal. After the European tour was finished, Paul flew straight back to New York, and the Winger project (initially known as "Sahara") began rehearsing and recording their debut album.

Taylor remained in Winger throughout the band's most successful period, which included the two smash albums, Winger and In the Heart of the Young. However, after the tour supporting the latter album ended in 1991, Taylor left the band in early 1992, citing exhaustion and a desire to write and get involved with other projects.

Throughout the 1990s, Taylor immersed himself in numerous other projects, perhaps the most prolific of which was recording and touring with Steve Perry for his 1994 solo album. In 1996, he returned to the Alice Cooper band (this time, alongside fellow former Winger guitarist Reb Beach), and once that tour ended, he embarked on a brief tour with Tommy Shaw.

Winger reunited in 2001 to record new material for a Greatest Hits album. Although it is unclear whether Taylor participated in these recording sessions, he did later join the band on the supporting tour.

Though Paul was asked by Kip Winger to rejoin the band again to work on their 2006 reunion album, he declined because he was already involved with other projects.

More recently, Taylor has become involved in composing music for television series programs and has also been pursuing his passion for photography. He also spent the summer months of 2012 touring with Cinderella throughout the U.S. playing keyboards for them. He returned to Winger during mid-2013 and performed with them on select tour dates up through early 2014 and appeared in the Queen Babylon released in late 2014.

Taylor played keyboards, guitars and co-wrote on former Motley Crue guitarist Mick Mars' debut solo album The Other Side of Mars. He also introduced Mars to vocalists Jacob Bunton and Brion Gamboa, who performed on the album.

== Discography ==
=== With Alice Cooper ===
- Raise Your Fist and Yell (1987)
- A Fistful of Alice (1997)

=== With Winger ===
- Winger (1988)
- In the Heart of the Young (1990)
- Seven (2023)

=== With Steve Perry ===
- For the Love of Strange Medicine (1994)

=== Guest appearances ===
- Bryan Ferry - Frantic (2002)
- Böhse Onkelz - Memento (2016)
- Mick Mars - The Other Side of Mars (2024)
