= Headed for a Heartbreak =

Single by Winger

from the album Winger
- B-side: "State of Emergency"
- Released: May 1989
- Genre: Glam metal
- Length: 5:10
- Label: Atlantic
- Songwriter: Kip Winger
- Producer: Beau Hill

Winger singles chronology
"Seventeen" (1989)	"Headed for a Heartbreak" (1989)	"Hungry" (1989)

"Headed for a Heartbreak" is a single by American glam metal band Winger from their self-titled debut album Winger. Released in May 1989, the power ballad reached No. 19 on the US Hot 100 and No. 8 on the US Mainstream Rock chart. The B-side to the single was "State of Emergency".

The music video for "Headed for a Heartbreak" was directed by Mark Rezyka and edited by Scott C. Wilson.

The song's riff was sampled in the song "Ground Zero" by the Diplomats, from the album Diplomatic Immunity.

== Background ==
Singer Kip Winger was fooling around with his keyboard at the end of a day in the studio, and came up with the riff, which is in D Lydian mode. He jammed on the riff a little bit, and "it was just one of those things that happened magically. ... A lot of times I'll sit down and the shit will just drop into my hands and I don't even think about it. That was one of those songs." He added, "Once I figured out what I had, I rotated the bass notes around the common tones of the right hand on the keyboard stuff, so there was some music theory at play in that song, at the end of it. But basically the riff just fell onto me by accident."

Winger said that for him, the song "exemplifies the band the most because of the way Rod drums and Reb's solo. It's in Lydian and it's more out in the zone of where we all come from."

== Charts ==
Chart (1989)	Peak position
Canada Top Singles (RPM)	77
US Billboard Hot 100	19
US Mainstream Rock (Billboard)	8
