= Winger (album) =

Studio album by Winger
- Released: August 1, 1988
- Recorded: 1988
- Studios: Atlantic Studios, New York City
- Genre: Glam metal
- Length: 43:50
- Label: Atlantic
- Producer: Beau Hill

Winger chronology
Winger (1988)	In the Heart of the Young (1990)

Singles from Winger
- 1. "Madalaine" Released: August 1988; 2. "Seventeen" Released: February 1989; 3. "Headed for a Heartbreak" Released: May 1989; 4. "Hungry" Released: September 1989

Professional ratings
Review scores
Source	Rating
AllMusic	4.5/5 stars
Collector's Guide to Heavy Metal	6/10
Sleaze Roxx	(favorable)

Winger is the debut studio album by American rock band Winger. The album was released through Atlantic Records in 1988 and was produced by Beau Hill.

== Background ==
The music was radio-friendly, but with a progressive twist. The lyrics, however, were typical of the age and genre.

Kip Winger has stated "Originally, the first album was supposed to be called "Sahara", but the label missed it and if you look at the bottom right corner, you'll see the name Sahara. So that's actually the name of our first record."

A number of radio and video hits were extracted from the album, including "Headed for a Heartbreak" and "Seventeen", peaking at No. 19 and No. 26 at the Billboard's single chart. On February 11, 1989, the album peaked at number 21 on the Billboard 200, and after that stayed on the chart for 63 weeks. It achieved platinum status in the United States and went gold in Canada and Japan.

In support of the album, Winger toured for over a year with Bad Company, Scorpions, Cinderella, Bon Jovi, Poison, Skid Row and Tesla.

Promotional videos were shot for the four singles "Madalaine", "Seventeen", "Headed for a Heartbreak" and "Hungry".

== Track listing ==
Side one
No.	Title	Writer(s)	Length
1.	"Madalaine"	Kip Winger, Reb Beach	3:44
2.	"Hungry"	Winger, Beach	3:58
3.	"Seventeen"	Winger, Beach, Beau Hill	4:05
4.	"Without the Night"	Winger, Beach, Paul Taylor	5:04
5.	"Purple Haze"	Jimi Hendrix	3:39

Side two
No.	Title	Writer(s)	Length
6.	"State of Emergency"	Winger, Taylor	3:37
7.	"Time to Surrender"	Winger, Beach	4:10
8.	"Poison Angel"	Winger, Beach	3:24
9.	"Hangin' On"	Winger, Beach, Hill	3:35
10.	"Headed for a Heartbreak"	Winger	5:13

CD bonus track
No.	Title	Writer(s)	Length
11.	"Higher and Higher" (B-side of the "Madalaine" single)	Winger, Beach	3:18

== Personnel ==
Credits are adapted from the album's liner notes.

Winger

- Kip Winger – bass, lead vocals, keyboards, string arrangements
- Reb Beach – guitars, backing vocals
- Paul Taylor – keyboards, backing vocals
- Rod Morgenstein – drums, backing vocals

Additional personnel

- Dweezil Zappa – left side guitar solo on "Purple Haze"
- Beau Hill, Ira McLaughlin – additional vocals
- Sandra Park, Rebecca Young, Hae Young Ham, Maria Kitsopoulos – strings

Production

- Beau Hill – producer, engineer
- Noah Baron, Jimmy Hoyson – assistant engineers
- Bob Schwall, Bob Caputo – technicians
- Stephen Benben – digital editing
- Ted Jensen – mastering at Sterling Sound, New York
- Brad Miskel, Ron Feddor – additional input
- Dan Hubp – cover art and design
- Steven Selikoff – photography

== Charts ==
Chart (1988–89)	Peak position
Australian Albums (ARIA)	153
Canada Top Albums/Cds (RPM)	57
US Billboard 200	21

== Certifications ==
Region	Certification	Certified units/sales
Canada (Music Canada)	Gold	50,000^{^}
United States (RIAA)	Platinum	1,000,000^{^}
^{^} Shipments figures based on certification alone.

== See also ==
- List of glam metal albums and songs
