= Pull (Winger album) =

Studio album by Winger
- Released: May 18, 1993
- Recorded: 1992–1993
- Genres: Hard rock; heavy metal; progressive metal
- Length: 47:07
- Label: Atlantic
- Producers: Mike Shipley, Kip Winger

Winger chronology
In the Heart of the Young (1990)	Pull (1993)	The Very Best of Winger (2001)

Singles from Pull
- 1. "Down Incognito" Released: 1993; 2. "Blind Revolution Mad" Released: 1993 (promo); 3. "Who's The One" Released: 1993 (promo)

Pull is the third studio album by American rock band Winger. The album was released in 1993 by Atlantic Records.

Replacing Beau Hill, Kip Winger took the production reins with the help of Mike Shipley, who had previously worked on Def Leppard's 1992 album, Adrenalize. With Winger and Shipley at the helm, the album's production was on a considerable budget and marked a significant change in Winger's sound, eschewing their glam metal anthems prevalent in their first two albums for a harder and more aggressive style of music with socio-political leanings on tracks like "Blind Revolution Mad", "In for the Kill" and "Who's the One".

In terms of sales figures the album was not as successful as the two first albums, peaking at #83 on Billboard's Album chart. However, the lead single "Down Incognito" reached #15 on the Mainstream rock Billboard chart.

Winger recorded Pull as a trio, as guitarist/keyboardist Paul Taylor left the band after the In the Heart of the Young tour in 1992. The group disbanded in less than a year after the album’s release, yet they would reform again in 2001.

A bonus track called "Hell to Pay" was available on the Japanese version of the album. This track is also included on the 2001 compilation The Very Best of Winger.

At ProgPower 2024, Winger performed the album in its entirety.

== Track listing ==
All tracks are written by Kip Winger and Reb Beach (except where noted).

No.	Title	Writer(s)	Length
1.	"Blind Revolution Mad"		5:25
2.	"Down Incognito"		3:49
3.	"Spell I'm Under"	Kip Winger	3:55
4.	"In My Veins"		3:14
5.	"Junkyard Dog (Tears on Stone)"		6:54
6.	"The Lucky One"		5:20
7.	"In for the Kill"		4:13
8.	"No Man's Land"		3:17
9.	"Like a Ritual"		5:02
10.	"Who's the One"		5:53

Japanese edition bonus track
No.	Title	Length
11.	"Hell to Pay"	3:24

== Personnel ==
=== Band members ===
- Kip Winger – vocals, bass, acoustic guitars, keyboards
- Reb Beach – guitars, backing vocals
- Rod Morgenstein – drums, percussion, backing vocals

=== Additional musicians ===
- Frank Latorre – harmonica on "Down Incognito"
- Alex Acuña – percussion on "Like A Ritual" and "Who's the One"

=== Album credits ===
- Produced by Mike Shipley
- Co-produced by Kip Winger
- Recorded and mixed by Mike Shipley
- Assisted by Mike Stock
- Mastered by Ted Jensen at Sterling Sound, New York
- Recorded and mixed at "Secret Sound - South Pacific"

== The Making of Pull ==
The Making of Pull was a VHS video released by Winger in 1993. It features home movie footage of the band in the studio recording the album Pull, plus promo videos for the following songs:

- "Down Incognito"
- "Spell I'm Under"
- "In My Veins"
- "Who's the One"

== Charts ==
Chart (1993)	Peak position
Japanese Albums (Oricon)	22
US Billboard 200	83
