= Reb Beach =

American guitarist (born 1963)

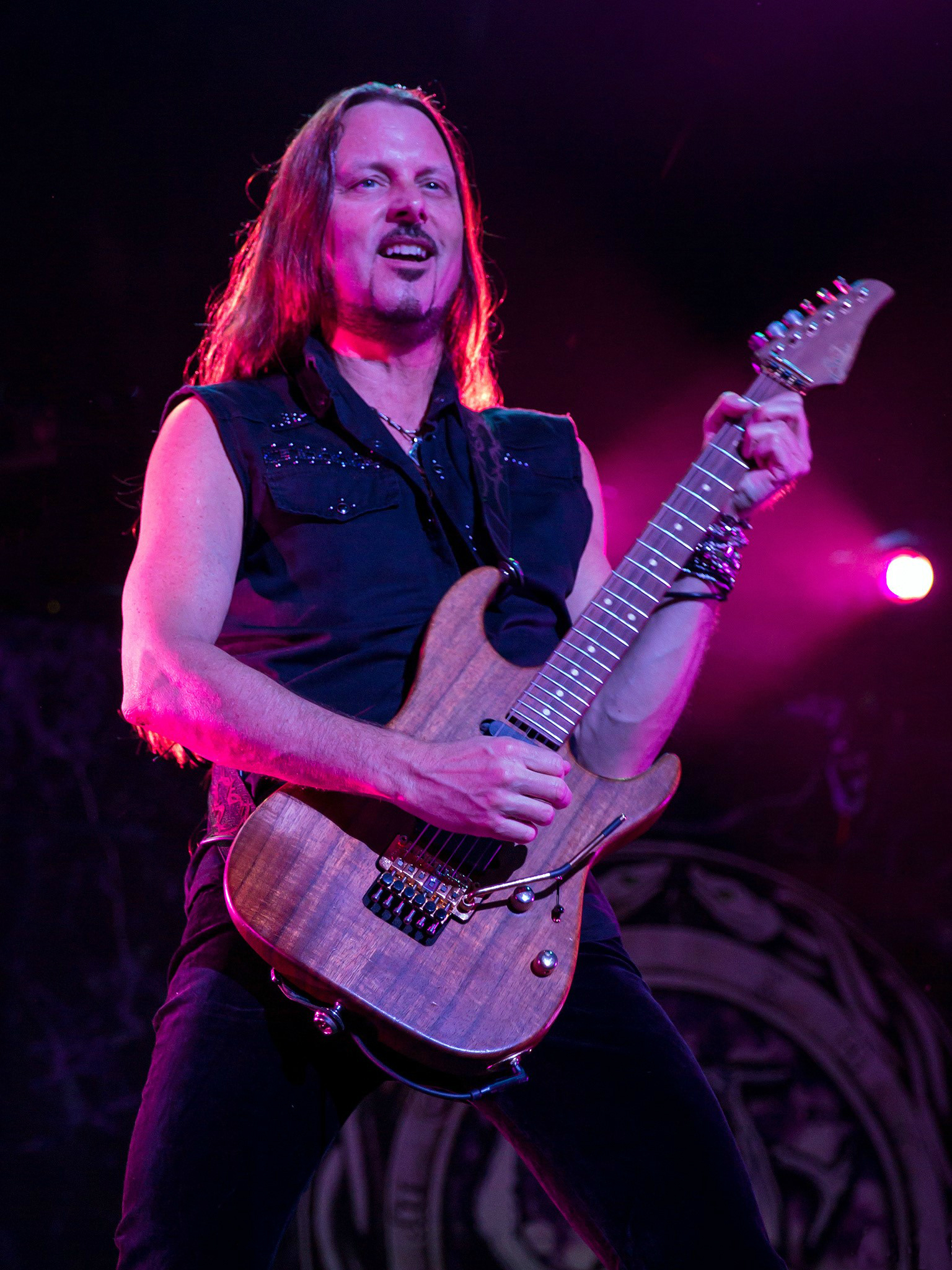
- Beach performing in 2015

Background information
- Born: Richard Earl Beach Jr. August 31, 1963 (age 63); Pittsburgh, Pennsylvania, U.S.
- Genres: Hard rock; heavy metal; glam metal
- Occupation: Musician
- Instrument: Guitar
- Years active: 1985–present
- Member of: Winger
- Formerly of: Dokken; Alice Cooper; Whitesnake; The Mob; Night Ranger
- Website: rebbeach.com

Richard Earl "Reb" Beach Jr. (born August 31, 1963) is an American hard rock guitarist. He is perhaps best known as the co-founder and lead guitarist of the band Winger.

== Career ==
After graduating from Fox Chapel Area High School and attending Berklee College of Music in the early 1980s, he played in Fiona's backing band and became an accomplished studio musician, working with the likes of Howard Jones, Chaka Khan, The Bee Gees, Twisted Sister, and Roger Daltrey, among others, showcasing Beach's ability to adapt to various musical styles.

While working with Fiona, he was introduced to Kip Winger, who was touring with Alice Cooper at the time. Eventually, they formed the band Sahara along with Rod Morgenstein and Paul Taylor, which was later renamed to Winger.

Winger recorded and toured in support of three albums, Winger (1988), In the Heart of the Young (1990) and Pull (1993). The band also released a number of hit singles, including "Seventeen", "Madalaine", "Headed for a Heartbreak" and "Miles Away".

After Winger disbanded in the mid-1990s, Beach first joined Alice Cooper's band and later replaced George Lynch in the heavy metal band Dokken. With Dokken he recorded one studio album, titled Erase the Slate, and a live DVD, titled Live from the Sun.

He was also involved with Sega, as he recorded the soundtrack for the video game Daytona USA 2.

Since leaving Dokken, Beach has been a part of several different recording and touring projects. In addition to sporadic touring with Winger, he released a solo effort entitled Masquerade in 2002. Since 2002, he has been a member of David Coverdale's current incarnation of Whitesnake and has been the longest-serving guitarist/member of the band to this day, excluding Coverdale.

A "supergroup" project called The Mob with King's X frontman dUg Pinnick and Night Ranger drummer Kelly Keagy resulted in a single self-titled album, released in 2005.

When not touring, Beach performs with his local ensemble, the Reb Beach Band, sometimes billed as The Reb Beach Project, based in his hometown of Pittsburgh, Pennsylvania. The group features prominent Pittsburgh musicians, including vocalist Jon Belan of Gene The Werewolf and drummer Dave Throckmorton, known for his work with various Pittsburgh-based projects.

A reformed Winger released their first studio recording in over a decade, IV, in 2006.

He replaced Jeff Watson in Night Ranger for a series of dates in Japan and the US, but announced his departure in January 2008.

He splits his time between Winger and Whitesnake, recording Better Days Comin' in 2014 with the former band, and The Purple Album with the latter in 2015. He continues to tour with both acts.

According to bandmate Kip Winger, Reb is quite adept at coming up with multiple rock riffs at a time, though he is often unable to remember them later.

Ibanez guitars produced his signature RBM models (stands for Reb Beach Model) in the early 1990s. On the 2005 Whitesnake reunion tour, he primarily used custom models by luthier Suhr Guitars.

In 2023, Winger released its seventh studio album, Seven.

== Discography ==
Year	Projects	Titles	Notes
1986	Fiona	Beyond the Pale	Guitars, tracks 2–4, 7, 10
1988	Winger	Winger	
1990	Winger	In the Heart of the Young	
1993	Winger	Pull	
1999	Dokken	Erase the Slate	
2000	Dokken	Live From the Sun	
2001	Reb Beach	The Fusion Demos	Self-released, Recorded in 1993
2001	Reb Beach	Masquerade	Label: Universal
2001	Winger	The Very Best of Winger	
2005	The Mob	The Mob	
2006	Whitesnake	Live... in the Still of the Night	DVD+CD
2006	Whitesnake	Live... in the Shadow of the Blues	
2006	Winger	IV	
2007	Winger	Demo Anthology	
2007	Winger	Winger Live	
2008	Whitesnake	Good to Be Bad	
2009	Winger	Karma	Label: Frontiers
2011	Whitesnake	Forevermore	
2013	Whitesnake	Made in Japan	
2013	Whitesnake	Made in Britain/The World Record	
2014	Winger	Better Days Comin'	
2015	Whitesnake	The Purple Album	
2017	Whitesnake	The Purple Tour	
2019	Whitesnake	Flesh & Blood	
2020	Black Swan	Shake The World	Label: Frontiers
2020	Reb Beach	A View From The Inside	Label: Frontiers
2022	Black Swan	Generation Mind	Label: Frontiers
2023	Winger	Seven (Winger album)	Label: Frontiers
2026	Black Swan	Paralyzed	Label: Frontiers

=== Guest appearances ===
- Howard Jones – One to One (1986)
- Chaka Khan – Destiny (1986)
- Bee Gees – E•S•P (1987) on the songs, "E•S•P", "Overnight"
- Twisted Sister – Love Is for Suckers (1987)
- The Lost Boys soundtrack (1987) with Roger Daltrey on the song, "Don't Let the Sun Go Down on Me"
- Brian McDonald Group – Desperate Business (1988)
- Minoru Niihara – One (1989)
- Xenon – America's New Design (1989)
- The Karate Kid Part III soundtrack (1989) with Winger on the song "Out for the Count"
- Bill and Ted's Bogus Journey soundtrack (1991) with Winger on the song "Battle Stations"
- Guitars that Rule the World (1991)
- Danger Danger – Cockroach (1993)
- Smoke on the Water – A Tribute to Deep Purple (1994)
- Andy Timmons – EarX-tacy 2 (1997)
- Alice Cooper – A Fistful of Alice (1997)
- Guitar Battle (1998)
- Daytona USA 2 Game soundtrack (1998)
- This Conversation Seems Like a Dream (1998)
- Bat Head Soup – A Tribute to Ozzy Osbourne (2000)
- A Tribute to Van Halen (2000)
- Brian McDonald – Wind it Up (2000)
- War and Peace – Light at the End of the Tunnel (2000)
- Stone Cold Queen: A Tribute (2001)
- Brian McDonald – Voyage (2003)
- Ken Tamplin and Friends – Wake the Nations (2003)
- XCarnation – Grounded (2005)
- Kelly Keagy – I'm Alive (2006)
- Northern Light Orchestra – Celebrate Christmas (2010)
- Rob Moratti – Victory (2011)

=== Video albums ===
- Winger – The Videos: Volume One (1989)
- Winger – In the Heart of the Young (1990)
- Winger – In the Heart of the Young Part 2 (1991)
- Winger – Live in Tokyo (1991)
- Solo – Cutting Loose VHS (Instructional videos, 1991)
- Winger – The Making of Pull (1993)
- Dokken – Live from the Sun (2002)
- Solo – Homegrown Private Lesson Volume 1 DVD (Instructional videos, 2003)
- Whitesnake – Live... in the Still of the Night (2006)
- Winger – The Making of Winger IV (2006)
- Winger – Winger Live (2007)

== See also ==
- Winger
- The Mob
- Whitesnake
- Alice Cooper
