= Winger (band) =

American rock band

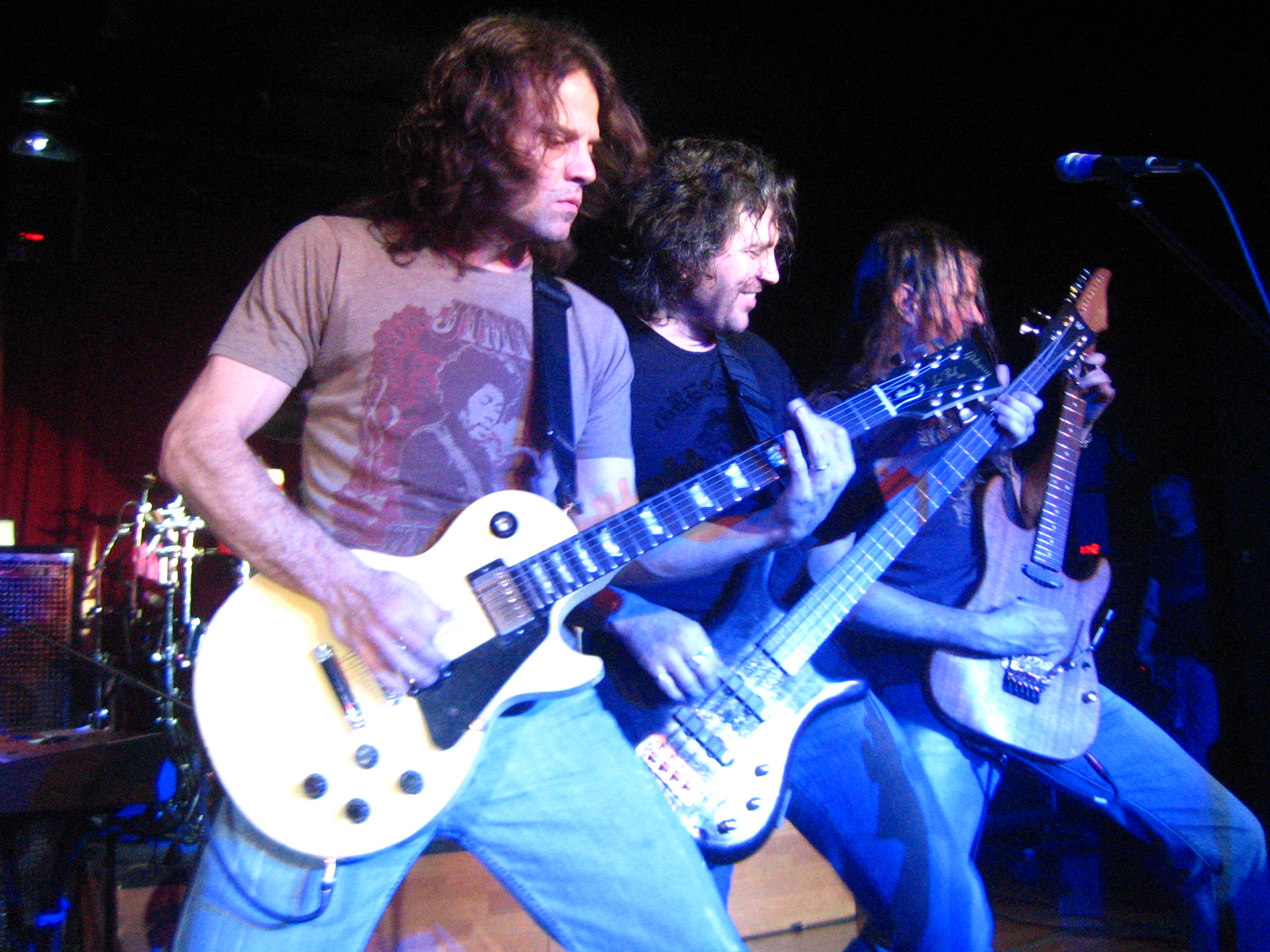
- Winger in 2007. Left to right: John Roth, Kip Winger, Reb Beach.

Background information
- Also known as: Sahara (1987–1988)
- Origin: New York City, NY, U.S.
- Genres: Hard rock; heavy metal; progressive metal; glam metal (early)
- Works: Discography
- Years active: 1987–1994; 2001–2003; 2006–present
- Labels: Atlantic; Frontiers
- Members: Kip Winger; Reb Beach; Rod Morgenstein; Paul Taylor; John Roth
- Past members: Cenk Eroğlu
- Website: wingertheband.com

Winger is an American rock band formed in New York City, in 1987. Winger gained popularity during the late 1980s and early 1990s with two platinum albums, Winger (1988) and In the Heart of the Young (1990), along with charting singles "Seventeen", "Headed for a Heartbreak" and "Miles Away". In 1990, the band was nominated for an American Music Award for "Best New Heavy Metal Band". As the music scene changed in the early to mid-1990s due to the popularity of grunge, their success faded following their third release, 1993's Pull. Winger disbanded less than a year later in 1994.

In 2001, Winger reunited and conducted several successful tours. In 2006, the band's 1993 touring lineup (minus Paul Taylor but including John Roth) reunited to record the band's first studio album in over 13 years, IV, and toured in support of the album into 2008. In 2009, the band released their fifth album, Karma, followed by Better Days Comin' in 2014. Their most recent album, Seven, was released in 2023.

== History ==
=== 1980: Early appearance ===
The first release under the name Winger was a Denver Rainbow Music Hall live recording of the song "Wizard of the Key" on the KAZY Thunder on the Mountain compilation in 1980. This lineup featured the brothers Kip, Nate, and Paul Winger and their friend Peter Fletcher (later a member of L.A.'s Pigmy Love Circus).

=== 1987–1994: Main career and breakup ===
In 1985, Kip Winger met Reb Beach in New York. A year later, Winger connected with Rod Morgenstein, the long-time drummer for the Dixie Dregs, and joined Alice Cooper's backing band, which included keyboardist Paul Taylor.

By March 1987, Winger, Morgenstein, Beach, and Taylor were performing together under the name Sahara. This name appears on their first album cover, spelled out in the lower right, however their band name was changed at the behest of Atlantic Records due to another band owning the trademark for the name Sahara. Short on ideas, Kip Winger settled on his own last name, at the suggestion of Alice Cooper.

The group's first album, Winger, was released on August 10, 1988, on Atlantic. The record was a success, achieving Platinum certification in the United States and Gold in Japan and Canada. On February 11, 1989, the album peaked at number 21 on the Billboard 200, and was in various places on the chart for sixty-three weeks. Radio and MTV hits from the album included "Madalaine", "Seventeen", "Headed for a Heartbreak" and "Hungry". To support the debut album, Winger first opened for acts such as Bad Company and the Scorpions, before booking a headlining tour of arenas in 1989. In 1990, the band was nominated for an American Music Award for "Best New Heavy Metal Band".

In 1990, Winger released In the Heart of the Young. The album went Platinum in the U.S. and Gold in Japan. Hit radio tracks and MTV videos included "Can't Get Enuff", "Miles Away" and "Easy Come Easy Go".

Winger supported their second album with a 13-month world tour, playing over 230 dates with Kiss, Scorpions, ZZ Top, Extreme and Slaughter. Paul Taylor left the band after the tour citing exhaustion. Winger's third album, Pull, produced by Mike Shipley, was recorded in 1992–1993 as a three-piece band. It was originally to be called Blind Revolution Mad after the opening song. Though not as successful commercially as the previous albums, it garnered sound reviews. On the following tour, John Roth replaced Paul Taylor on rhythm guitar. The album's release, however, coincided with the rise of grunge, which swept aside the brand of melodic hard rock that Winger represented.

After disbanding in early 1994 following the Japanese leg of the Pull tour, Kip Winger embarked on a solo career. Beach worked with Alice Cooper from 1995 until leaving to join Dokken in 1997. Beach was then lead guitarist for Whitesnake from 2002–2022. Morgenstein and Roth resumed their careers as session musicians.

=== 2000–2019: Reunion ===
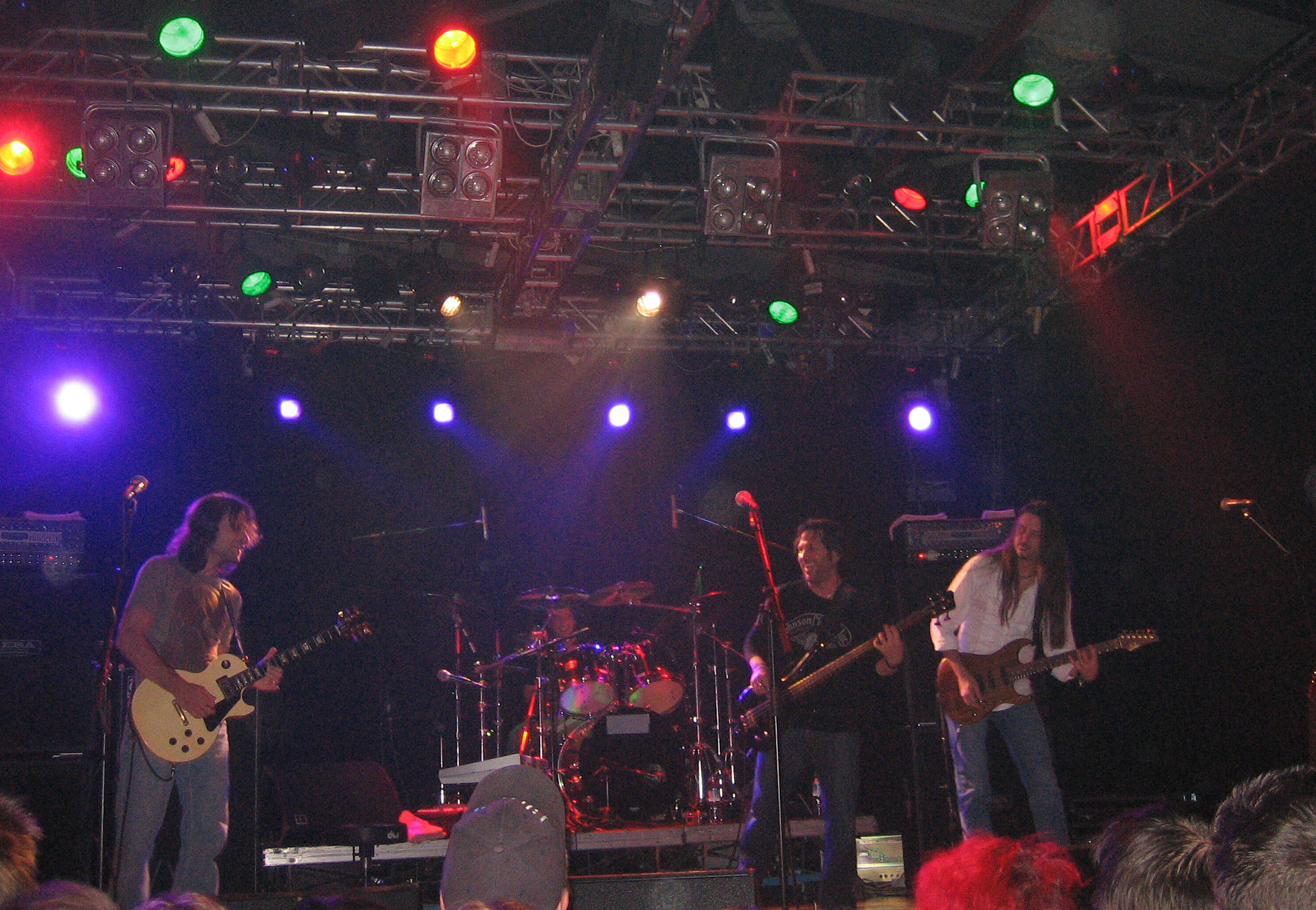
Winger performing in 2006

In 2001, it was announced that all original band members would return to the studio to record "On the Inside" for The Very Best of Winger. In 2002, all five members embarked on a reunion tour of the U.S. and Canada on a bill with Poison. According to Kip Winger in a 2008 interview with rock and roll comic C.C. Banana, it was important to include all five members. "It was the big, long-awaited reunion so I wanted to include everybody who had ever been in the band."

In 2003, it was confirmed that activity had been halted due to Reb Beach's touring commitment with Whitesnake and involvement with supergroup the Mob.

On July 16, 2005, Kip Winger was announced as the lead singer for the Alan Parsons Live Project at the Common Ground Music Festival in Lansing, Michigan. In May 2006, Winger reformed without Paul Taylor to record another album and tour Europe. The album, IV, was released in Europe in October and the nine-country "Winger IV Tour" ran in the last two weeks of the same month.

On February 25, 2008, the band performed in Providence, Rhode Island, as part of a benefit for survivors of the Station nightclub fire. The concert debuted on VH1 Classic on March 23, 2008.

In late 2009, it was confirmed that Winger would record a fifth album, Karma, with a tour to support it.

Winger released their sixth album, Better Days Comin', in April 2014.

=== 2020–present: Seven and farewell tour ===
Winger continued to tour theaters and clubs across the United States into the 2020s though they were forced to slow in 2020 due to the COVID-19 pandemic. One show was canceled in 2021 due to infections among the band's touring party.

According to a 2021 Reb Beach interview, Winger's seventh album was in the recording process. Seven was released on May 5, 2023, along with the single "Proud Desperado".

Winger launched their farewell tour in 2025. The tour concluded on August 31, 2025, at the Rainbow Bar and Grill in Los Angeles. In February 2026, Winger announced several additional shows.

== Style and influences ==
Kip Winger, in description of the band's musical ability and style, said, "Our band was known to musicians, and a lot of musicians showed up to see me play—watching, trying to figure out how I'm playing. We were like the 'hair band' [version of] Dream Theater."

== Legacy ==
Winger has often been described in the context of losing momentum due to grunge. In the 1990s, they were subject to mockery from MTV's animated series Beavis and Butt-Head. Series creator Mike Judge later revealed he was inaccurately informed that Kip Winger requested the series not make jokes about the band, and that led to further Winger jokes. Judge later learned from Winger himself he had never made such a stipulation. Stewart, an early character, wore a Winger t-shirt during the show's original run on MTV during the 1990s as well both of its revivals in 2011 and 2022. Characterized as a wimp who looked up to Beavis and Butt-head, he wore the shirt in an attempt to emulate them. Their shirts had the logos of AC/DC and Metallica.

Kip Winger said in 2014 he had emailed Judge in 2011 to clear the air, and neither he nor the band ever sued MTV over the parody representation. Kip said about the cartoon, "It certainly didn’t help us, I’ll tell you that. But it was a funny show and Mike’s a funny guy."

In 2013, Corey Deiterman of The Houston Press placed Winger at the top of his list of "The 10 Worst Metal Bands of the '80s", in which he told readers: "Don’t, under any circumstances, be this guy." In 2023, Kip Winger said the 1990s backlash against his band spurred him to start composing classical music for which he received a Grammy nomination in 2016.

== Members ==
Current members

- Kip Winger – lead vocals, bass, acoustic guitar, keyboards, percussion (1987–1994, 2001–2003, 2006–present)
- Reb Beach – lead guitar, backing vocals, harmonica (1987–1994, 2001–2003, 2006–present)
- Rod Morgenstein – drums, percussion, backing vocals, piano (1987–1994, 2001–2003, 2006–present)
- Paul Taylor – keyboards, guitar, backing vocals (1987–1992, 2001–2003, 2013–2014, 2014–2017, 2018–present)
- John Roth – guitar, backing vocals, bass, talkbox (2001–2003, 2006–present; touring member 1992–1994)

Former members

- Cenk Eroğlu – keyboards, guitar, backing vocals (2006–2009; session musician 2014, 2023) (Note: Though he was an official band member from 2006 until 2009 and appeared on the 2006 album IV, Eroglu was absent for most live shows during 2007.)

Touring substitutes

- Donnie Wayne Smith – guitar, backing vocals, bass (2014–2019) (Note: Donnie Wayne Smith filled-in for Roth live sporadically between 2014 and 2017.)
- Howie Simon – guitar, backing vocals (2018–2025, 2026–present) (Note: Howie Simon filled-in for Roth live from 2018 until 2025, and since 2026.)

Timeline

== Discography ==
Studio albums

- Winger (1988)
- In the Heart of the Young (1990)
- Pull (1993)
- IV (2006)
- Karma (2009)
- Better Days Comin' (2014)
- Seven (2023)
