= Kip Winger =

American rock musician

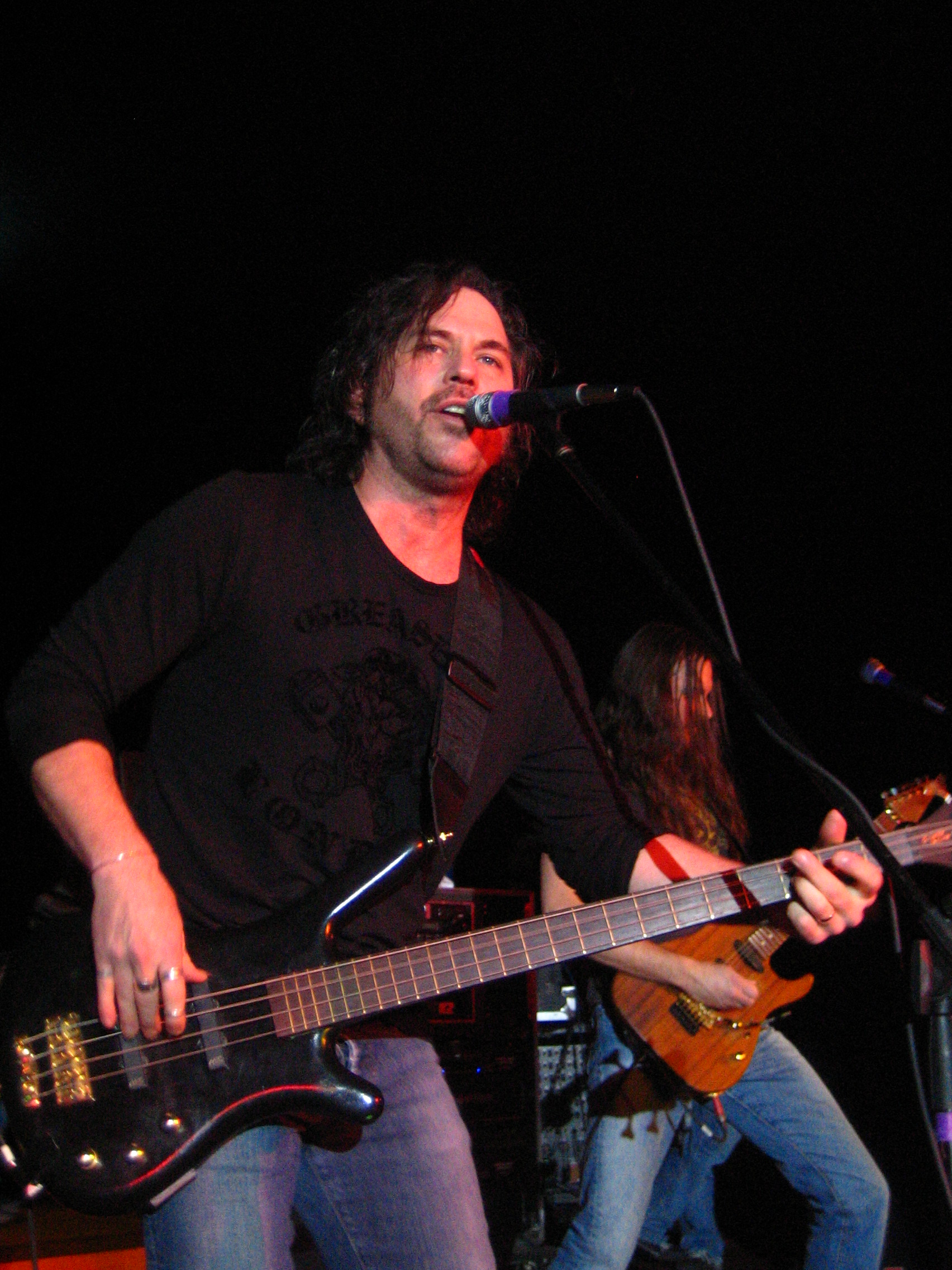
- Kip Winger performing at Avalon in Santa Clara, California, March 2007

Background information
- Born: Charles Frederick Winger; June 21, 1961 (age 65); Denver, Colorado, U.S.
- Genres: Hard rock; glam metal; heavy metal; progressive metal; progressive rock; classical music
- Occupation: Musician
- Instruments: Vocals; bass guitar
- Years active: 1978–present
- Label: Frontiers
- Member of: Winger
- Formerly of: Alice Cooper; The Mob; Blackwood Creek
- Website: kipwinger.com

Charles Frederick "Kip" Winger (born June 21, 1961) is an American musician, songwriter and composer. He is best known as the frontman, lead singer and bass player of the rock band Winger, but also runs parallel careers as a solo rock artist and contemporary classical composer. He initially gained notability as a member of Alice Cooper's band, contributing bass to his Constrictor (1986) and Raise Your Fist and Yell (1987) albums.

== Biography ==
=== Early days ===
Winger was born in Denver to parents who were both musicians. At age 16, Winger began studying classical music after hearing the works of composers such as Debussy, Ravel, and Stravinsky in ballet class. At that time he sent a demo tape to Alan Parsons, from whom he received a personal reply. (Note: Years later, when Winger was chosen to be the lead singer of The Alan Parsons Live Project, he presented Parsons with that letter from 30 years prior.)

As a teenager, Winger played in a band named Blackwood Creek with his brothers Nate and Paul plus friend Peter Fletcher (formerly in Pigmy Love Circus). Blackwood Creek disbanded in 1980. Kip, his brothers, and Fletcher also played the Denver area bar scene as the band Colorado. Winger's first release was a Rainbow Music Hall live recording of the song "Wizard of the Key" on the KAZY Thunder on the Mountain compilation in 1980 under the band name Winger which was the Colorado band line-up using a different name.

In 1982, he studied with Sam Guarnaccia in Denver then moved to New York City and waited tables while studying composition with Edgar Grana.

=== Success ===
Kip Winger's first commercial break came in 1984, when he co-wrote the song "Bang Bang" for Kix's third album, Midnite Dynamite. During that time he was working closely with the record producer Beau Hill, recording bass and vocals on various records. While Reb Beach was working on Fiona Flanagan's Beyond the Pale record at Atlantic Records, Winger and Beach were introduced to each other and later began recording demos. In 1985, Winger joined Alice Cooper's band. After making two albums and touring with Cooper, much of the time alongside keyboardist/guitarist Paul Taylor, Winger left in March 1987 to focus on his own band.

Winger returned to New York to work on songs with Reb Beach, and they were soon joined by Paul Taylor and drummer Rod Morgenstein. They initially performed under the name Sahara, but eventually changed their name to Winger, at Alice Cooper's suggestion. Winger released three albums (Winger (1988), In the Heart of the Young (1990), and Pull (1993)) before moving on to solo careers.

=== Solo career ===
Kip Winger then moved to New Mexico to work on his solo career, and study with Richard Hermann at the University of New Mexico.

Winger worked and recorded three solo records in Santa Fe, New Mexico: This Conversation Seems Like a Dream, Down Incognito and Songs from the Ocean Floor. In 2002 he moved to Nashville and began working on a fourth solo record, From the Moon to the Sun (2008), which he co-produced with Cenk Eroglu.

=== Reunited Winger ===
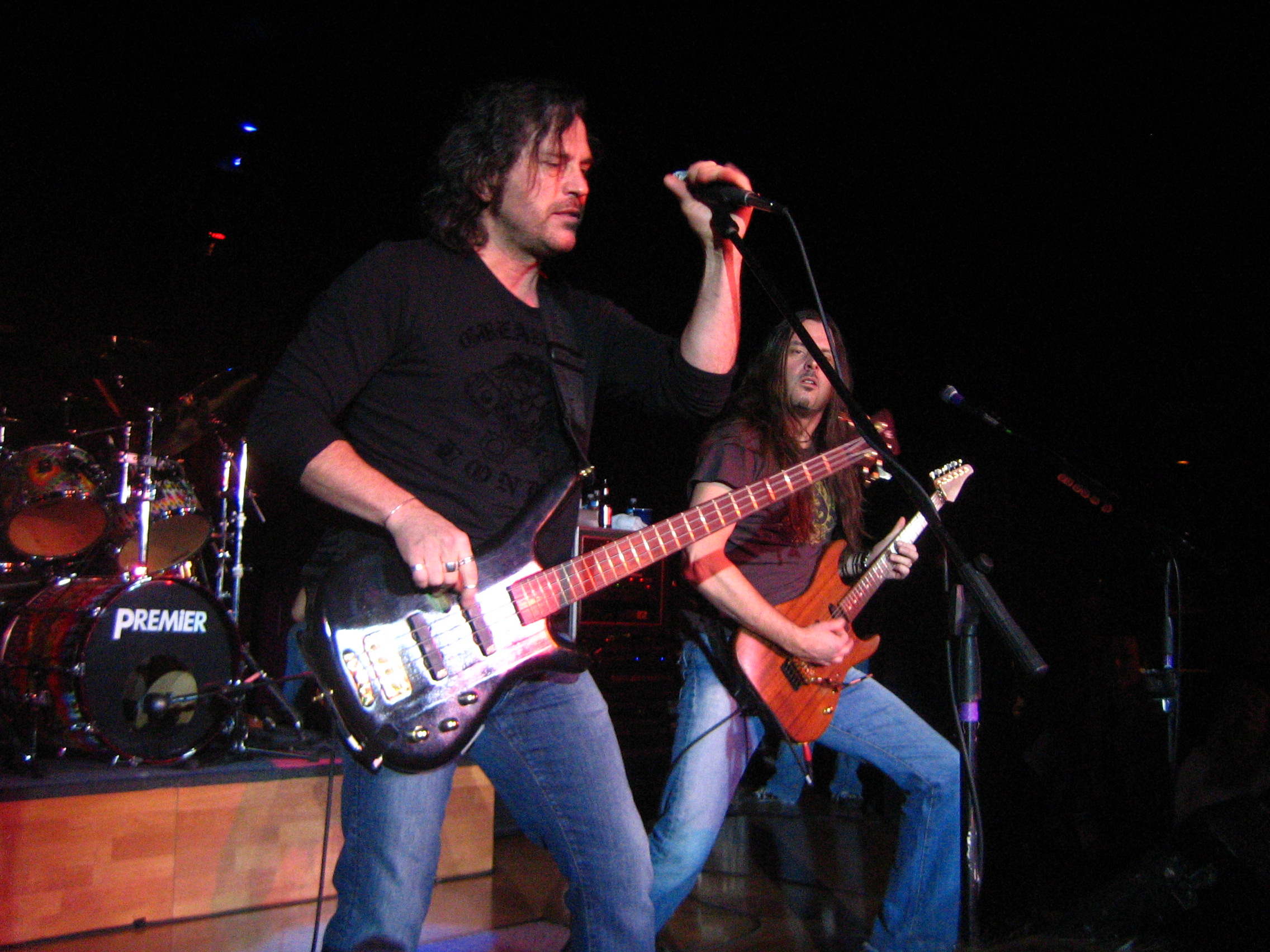
Kip Winger performing with Winger at Avalon, 2007

In September 2006, it was announced that Winger would be reformed, with the Pull era line-up, to record the band's fourth studio album, IV, and going on tour to support it. During the tour, Winger recorded Winger Live which was released on CD and DVD in 2007. It was confirmed that an anthology of rare tracks and early recordings, Demo Anthology (2007) would be released, as well as an autographed limited-edition album, Seventeen: The Demos, with only 300 copies being made. In 2009, Winger recorded their fifth studio album, Karma, which was hailed as their best record. The band toured the U.S., Europe, and South America.

=== Classical music ===
After the release of From the Moon to the Sun, Winger studied with Michael Kurek and composed a thirty-minute symphonic piece, "Ghosts", written for strings, piano, and harp for a ballet commission. The work had its premiere with the Tucson Symphony Orchestra on November 14–15, 2009. Choreographer Christopher Wheeldon created the ballet "Ghosts", which premiered at the San Francisco Ballet on February 9, 2010, with set design by Laura Jellinek, lighting design by M.L. Geiger, and costume design by Mark Zappone.

Winger was nominated for an Isadora Duncan Award for Excellence in Music. The ballet was a hit and was brought back for a second season in 2010. Next, Winger composed a four-part work entitled C.F. Kip Winger: Conversations with Nijinsky, intended to celebrate the life of ballet dancer and choreographer Vaslav Nijinsky. The album was recorded by the San Francisco Ballet Orchestra and went to the top of the Traditional Classical Chart on the Billboard music charts. C.F. Kip Winger: Conversations with Nijinsky was nominated in the Best Classical Contemporary Composition category at the 59th Annual Grammy Awards.

=== Get Jack, A Musical Thriller ===
Kip Winger's theater debut as a composer was the musical thriller Get Jack , with book/lyrics by Damien Gray (Atomic the Musical, Animagique, Sing On Tour). The story revolves around the five female victims of Jack the Ripper: Mary Ann Nichols, Annie Chapman, Elizabeth Stride, Catherine Eddowes, and Mary Jane Kelly—known as the "canonical five"—who rise from the dead to track down Jack and take revenge.

Get Jack's director was Kelly Devine and Andy Peterson was the musical director; it was presented in concert in October 2019 in New York. Winger and Gray released the rock/orchestral Get Jack concept album in July 2019, which entered Billboard's Cast Albums chart at No. 7.

=== Miscellaneous ===
Winger's composition "Blue Suede Shoes" from the album IV honored the service and sacrifice of United States armed forces and their families. In appreciation, General Harold Cross presented Winger with an honorary plaque and historic United States of America flag. The presentation occurred in a surprise ceremony during the taping of Legends & Lyrics.on PBS.

On Beavis and Butt-Head one of the recurring characters, Stewart Stevenson, wears a Winger T-shirt in contrast to the AC/DC and Metallica shirts worn by Beavis and Butt-Head.

He has participated and performed as head counselor in the Rock 'n' Roll Fantasy Camp with musicians including Roger Daltrey, Steven Tyler, Todd Rundgren, Jack Blades, Kelly Keagy, Bruce Kulick, Bill Leverty, Steve Lukather, Duff McKagan, Mark Slaughter, Carmine Appice, Jeff Beck, Brian Wilson and Rudy Sarzo. Winger was featured in an episode of the American TV show Pawn Stars in May 2013 as helping the host, Rick Harrison, through Rock Fantasy Camp.

In the early 1990s, Jackson Guitars made a Kip Winger Signature Bass.

== Discography ==
=== Studio albums ===
- This Conversation Seems Like a Dream (1997)
- Down Incognito (1999)
- Songs from the Ocean Floor (2001)
- From the Moon to the Sun (2008)
- Ghosts – Suite No. 1 (2010)
- Conversations with Nijinsky (2016)
- Symphony of the Returning Light / Violin Concerto, "In the Language of Flowers" (P. Otto, Nashville Symphony, Guerrero) (Naxos, 2026)

=== Soundtrack albums ===
- Get Jack with Damien Gray (2019)

=== Box sets ===
- Solo Box Set Collection (2018)

=== with Winger ===
- Winger (1988)
- In the Heart of the Young (1990)
- Pull (1993)
- IV (2006)
- Karma (2009)
- Better Days Comin' (2014)
- Seven (2023)

=== with Alice Cooper ===
- Constrictor (1986)
- Raise Your Fist and Yell (1987)
- Trash (1989) (track 10) - backing vocals
- Welcome 2 My Nightmare (2011) (tracks 6 & 9) - backing vocals

=== with Fiona ===
- Heart Like a Gun (1989)

=== with The Mob ===
- The Mob (2005)

=== with Blackwood Creek ===
- Blackwood Creek (2009)

=== Other contributions ===
- Kix – Midnite Dynamite (1985)
- Fiona – Beyond the Pale (1986)
- Alice Cooper – Trash (1989)
- Kane Roberts – Kane Roberts (1987)
- Twisted Sister – Love Is for Suckers (1987)
- Bob Dylan – Down in the Groove (1988)
- Various artists – Hearts of Fire soundtrack (1987)
- Blue Yonder – Blue Yonder (1987)
- Orange Swirl – Orange Swirl (1998)
- Seven Days – Ride (1998)
- Rob Eberhard Young – Speak (1999)
- Under Suspicion – Under Suspicion (2001)
- Jordan Rudess – Rhythm of Time (2004)
- Twenty Flight Rockers – The New York Sessions 1988 (2004)
- XCarnation – Grounded (2005)
- Jordan Rudess – The Road Home (2007)
- Northern Light Orchestra – Orchestra Arrangements (2009)
- Alice Cooper – Welcome 2 My Nightmare (2011)

=== Tributes ===
- "Space Truckin'" – Smoke on the Water – A Tribute to Deep Purple (1994)
- "I'm in Love with My Car" – Stone Cold Queen: A Tribute (2001)
- "I Want You" – Spin the Bottle: An All-Star Tribute to Kiss (2004)
- "A Love Like Yours (Don't Come Knocking Everyday)" – What's Love? a Tribute to Tina Turner (2004)
- "Limelight" & "The Spirit of Radio" – Subdivisions: A Tribute to Rush (2005)
- "Send Her My Love" – An '80s Metal Tribute to Journey (2006)
- "Drive My Car" – Butchering the Beatles: A Headbashing Tribute (2006)
- "Holding Back the Years" (by Simply Red) – Hair Metal Greatest Power Ballad Covers (2009)

=== Videos/DVDs ===
- Alice Cooper – The Nightmare Returns (1986)
- Winger – The Videos, Vol. 1 (1989)
- Winger – In the Heart of the Young, Vol. 1 (1990)
- Winger – In the Heart of the Young, Vol. 2 (1991)
- Winger – Live in Tokyo (1991)
- Winger – The Making of Pull (1993)
- Various artists – VH1 Metal Mania Stripped Across America Tour Live (2006)
- Winger – The Making of Winger IV (2007)
- Winger Live (2007)
- Winger DVD – Then & Now: The Making of Pull & Winger IV (2009)

== Reviews and interviews ==
- RockReport Review May 2008
- Metal Sludge Rewind with Kip Winger Retrieved on 2009-01-01
- Kip Winger Interview October 2008
- Kip Winger-Interview November 2007
- Ghosts and Simpler Times by Mike Ward San Francisco Bay Times February 2010
- No Pride in Prejudice By Janos Gereben – Classical Voice February 2010
- rock star reinvents himself with the help of Blair professor Michael Kurek by Jim Patterson – Vanderbilt View June 2010
- Winger's True Passion: Music For Ballet by Amy Sciarretto October 2010
