= Beau Hill =

American record producer

Beau Hill is an American record producer who is best known for his work with Ratt, Alice Cooper, Kix, Winger, Streets, Warrant, Fiona, and Europe. He also played instruments and sang backing vocals for some of the artists that he produced, as well as for his own bands Airborne (which had a record released in 1979 on Columbia), and Shanghai, who both released albums in the early 1980s. Hill was one of the founding partners of Interscope Records.

== Biography ==
At age six Beau entered The Texas Conservatory of Music and studied classical piano and composition. Five years later he was playing guitar in local groups and began learning how to write pop and rock music. He graduated from Jesuit College Preparatory School of Dallas and was accepted to Yale but declined to attend in order to pursue a career in recording and production. Beau attended the University of Colorado from 1971 to 1974, majoring in music and history, while working as an engineer at Applewood Recording Studios.

After being promoted to head engineer at Applewood, Hill got his first production job working for Chicago producer and Caribou Ranch Studios owner James William Guercio. During this period, Hill honed his production skills with hours at Applewood doing demos with his band Airborne, featuring the guitar work of David Zajicek. These demos caught the ear of veteran producer Keith Olsen (Fleetwood Mac, Foreigner, Whitesnake and Grateful Dead).

In 1978 Airborne signed a major recording contract with Columbia Records and a management contract with Irving Azoff and Bob Buziak at Frontline Management. Keith Olsen produced the debut album in L.A.. An Airborne demo of the song "Bored with Russia", written by Hill, found its way into the hands of Welsh band Budgie who recorded it for their 1982 album Deliver Us from Evil.

Hill moved to New York City in 1980, signed with Chrysalis Records and Aucoin Management (Kiss, Billy Idol), and recorded the debut album with his new group Shanghai, produced by Bruce Fairbairn and engineered by Bob Rock.

An opportunity presented itself for Hill to develop and record Houston-based singer/songwriter Sandy Stewart. Stewart’s demos found their way to Stevie Nicks, immediately after her first platinum solo effort, and resulted in Stewart getting signed to Modern / Atlantic Records (Nicks’s label), with Hill as the producer. Stewart and Hill went on to co-write three songs with Nicks for her next solo venture The Wild Heart.

In 1983, Atlantic Records president Doug Morris recruited Hill to produce the newly signed group Ratt. The debut effort sold over 3 million copies domestically alone, and made Hill an internationally acclaimed producer. He went on to produce the next three Ratt albums, all of which enjoyed multi-platinum success. In 1985, while still working with Ratt, he also produced Midnite Dynamite by Kix and Crimes in Mind by Streets.

In 1986, Hill produced Alice Cooper's comeback album Constrictor, then in London he produced and arranged the original motion picture soundtrack to Hearts of Fire. The recording featured three new songs by Bob Dylan with Eric Clapton and Ron Wood.

In 1987, the formation of 'Control Management' found Hill's career moving in a new direction, working with Winger, whose debut album sold 1.8 million copies. He also worked with multi-platinum band Warrant and the Japanese female rock band Show-Ya.

In 1990, Hill was recruited by Doug Morris to form a new label for Atlantic Records with multi-platinum producer Jimmy Iovine. Shortly after the introduction of Ted Field, Interscope Records was born. Hill also produced Bad Reputation for the band Dirty White Boy. In 1991 he produced Prisoners in Paradise, Europe's fifth album.

Since 1994, Hill has continued producing, mixing and developing new artists, including up and coming Michigan rockers Bad Side. He mixed some songs for the band's 2007 CD, Bad Side II (released 18 September 2007). He has also been involved with several successful international business ventures, but his main focus is working with up-and-coming artists. In 2007, Hill mastered "1.0" by Never Enough (featuring members of Lylah and 18 Visions). In 2010 Hill mixed Bipolar Echo's EP "Weird Days," and in 2012, Hill remixed the song "Pamela" by Finnish glam rock band Stala & SO., and in 2014, mixed Irish rock band Nine Lies' track "Save Me", from their 2015 album 9 Lies. In 2015, Hill mixed the album "Happily Neverafter" by Murder FM, featuring a remix by Tommy Lee of Mötley Crüe. In 2016 and 2019 Hill mixed 3 song from portuguese band Redlizzard, The Answer, Shake It and Back Together. In 2023, Hill mixed Crucible Divine's second album "Righteous Crusade" featuring Dale Thompson of Bride, and Timothy Gaines formerly of Stryper.

== Affiliations ==
Hill is a voting member of the National Academy of Recording Arts and Sciences, which organizes the Grammy Awards, as well as being affiliated with the Audio Engineering Society, American Society of Composers, Authors and Publishers, and Broadcast Music, Inc. as a writer and music publisher.
