= Monster Ballads: Platinum Edition =

Compilation album by Various artists
- Released: 2005 (Exclusive); January 31, 2006 (Retail)
- Genre: Glam metal
- Label: Razor & Tie

Monster Ballads chronology
| Monster Ballads Volume 2 (2001) | Monster Ballads: Platinum Edition (2005) | Monster Ballads XMas (2007) |

Professional ratings
Review scores
| Source | Rating |
|---|---|
| Allmusic | link 2 3 |

Monster Ballads: Platinum Edition is a compilation album. It features many power ballads, most of which appeared on previous Monster Ballads installations or related albums.

== Track listing ==
=== Disc 1 ===
1. "Heaven" - Warrant
2. "I Remember You" - Skid Row
3. "When the Children Cry" - White Lion
4. "Headed for a Heartbreak" - Winger
5. "High Enough" - Damn Yankees
6. "Love of a Lifetime" - FireHouse
7. "To Be with You" - Mr. Big
8. "Don't Close Your Eyes" - Kix
9. "When I See You Smile" - Bad English
10. "Carrie" - Europe
11. "Fly High Michelle" - Enuff Z'nuff
12. "Love Is on the Way" - Saigon Kick
13. "The Flame" - Cheap Trick
14. "House of Pain" - Faster Pussycat
15. "Miles Away" - Winger
16. "If You Needed Somebody" - Bad Company

=== Disc 2 ===
1. "Every Rose Has Its Thorn" - Poison
2. "Don't Know What You Got (Till It's Gone)" - Cinderella
3. "Fly to the Angels" - Slaughter
4. "Silent Lucidity" - Queensrÿche
5. "Love Song" - Tesla
6. "Is This Love?" - Whitesnake
7. "Forever" - Kiss
8. "I'll Never Let You Go" - Steelheart
9. "Tracy's Song/Only Time Will Tell" - Nelson
10. "Wind of Change" - Scorpions
11. "The Angel Song" - Great White
12. "I'll See You in My Dreams" - Giant
13. "More Than Words" - Extreme
14. "When I'm with You" - Sheriff
15. "The Ballad of Jayne" - L.A. Guns
16. "Honestly" - Stryper

=== Retail Version ===
1. "I Remember You" - Skid Row - 5:14
2. "Heaven" - Warrant - 3:56
3. "Every Rose Has Its Thorn" - Poison - 4:20
4. "Fly to the Angels" - Slaughter - 4:31
5. "Don't Know What You Got (Till It's Gone)" - Cinderella - 5:49
6. "When the Children Cry" - White Lion - 4:19
7. "Headed for a Heartbreak" - Winger - 4:00
8. "Forever" - Kiss - 3:49
9. "Love of a Lifetime" - FireHouse - 4:48
10. "High Enough" - Damn Yankees - 4:17
11. "Is This Love" - Whitesnake - 4:42
12. "Love Song" - Tesla - 4:04
13. "To Be with You" - Mr. Big - 3:20
14. "Don't Close Your Eyes" - Kix - 4:17
15. "Carrie" - Europe - 4:32
16. "More Than Words" - Extreme - 4:10
17. "Wind of Change" - Scorpions - 5:13
18. "Silent Lucidity" - Queensrÿche - 5:46
