= Live (Kix album) =

Live album by Kix
- Released: June 22, 1993
- Recorded: October 5, 1991
- Venue: Ritchie Coliseum, University of Maryland at College Park, MD, with Sheffield Remote Recording facilities
- Genre: Hard rock; glam metal
- Length: 74:40
- Label: Atlantic
- Producer: Donnie Purnell

Kix chronology
Hot Wire (1991)	Live (1993)	Show Business (1995)

Singles from Live
- 1. "Cold Blood / Yeah, Yeah, Yeah" Released: 1993

Professional ratings
Review scores
Source	Rating
AllMusic	3.5/5 stars
Collector's Guide to Heavy Metal	6/10

Live is a live album by American hard rock band Kix, recorded at the University of Maryland's Ritchie Coliseum in October 1991. It was released in 1993 on Atlantic Records.

== Track listing ==
1. "Hot Wire" (Donnie Purnell, Taylor Rhodes) – 6:05
2. "Same Jane" (Purnell, Bob Halligan Jr.) – 4:54
3. "Rock and Roll Overdose" (Purnell, Rhodes) – 4:27
4. "Sex" (Purnell, Steve Whiteman) – 4:42
5. "The Itch" (Purnell) – 6:28
6. "For Shame" (Purnell)– 5:34
7. "Tear Down the Walls" (Purnell, Rhodes) – 4:47
8. "Blow My Fuse" (Purnell) – 5:52
9. "Girl Money" (Purnell, Rhodes) – 7:06
10. "Cold Blood" (Purnell, Rhodes) – 6:32
11. "Don't Close Your Eyes" (Purnell, Halligan Jr., John Palumbo) – 4:25
12. "Yeah, Yeah, Yeah" (Brian Forsythe, Purnell, Jimmy Chalfant, Ronnie Younkins, Whiteman) – 13:50

== Personnel ==
Kix

- Steve Whiteman – lead vocals, harmonica, saxophone, acoustic guitar
- Ronnie "10/10" Younkins – guitars, backing vocals
- Brian "Damage" Forsythe – guitars
- Donnie Purnell – bass, keyboards, piano, backing vocals, producer, mixing
- Jimmy "Chocolate" Chalfant – drums, percussion, backing vocals, mixing

Production

- Garth Micheal – engineer
- Steve Weinkam – assistant engineer
- Fred Derby – mixing
- Larry Freemantle – art direction
