= Greatest Mrs.: The Best of Saigon Kick =

Greatest hits album by Saigon Kick
- Released: 1998
- Genre: Hard rock
- Label: Atlantic

Saigon Kick chronology
Devil in the Details (1995)	Greatest Mrs.: The Best of Saigon Kick (1998)	Moments from the Fringe (1998)

Professional ratings
Review scores
Source	Rating
AllMusic	4/5 stars

Greatest Mrs.: The Best of Saigon Kick is a Saigon Kick compilation album.

== Track listing ==
1. "What You Say"
2. "Coming Home"
3. "Colors"
4. "The Lizard"
5. "All I Want"
6. "Love Is On The Way"
7. "Hostile Youth"
8. "One Step Closer"
9. "Water"
10. "I Love You"
11. "Close to You"
12. "Russian Girl"
13. "Eden"
14. "Everybody"
15. "Hey! Hey! Hey!"
16. "Suzy" (live)
17. "What Do You Do" (live)
18. "Ugly" (live)

== Personnel ==
- Matt Kramer: Lead Vocals on 1-7 and 15-18
- Jason Bieler: Lead Vocals on 8-14, Guitar on all songs
- Pete Dembrowski: Guitar on 12-14
- Tom Defile: Bass on 1-7 and 15-18
- Chris McLernon: Bass on 8-14
- Phil Varone: Drums on all songs
