= Show Business (album) =

Studio album by Kix
- Released: April 4, 1995
- Studios: Guido's Studio, Waynesboro, Pennsylvania
- Genres: Hard rock; glam metal
- Length: 47:35
- Label: CMC International
- Producer: Donnie Purnell

Kix chronology
Live (1993)	Show Business (1995)	Rock Your Face Off (2014)

Show Business (stylized as $how Bu$ine$$) is the sixth studio album by American hard rock band Kix. It was released in 1995 through CMC International, following their departure from Atlantic Records. Kix supported the album with a North American tour.

The album was a commercial flop, but fans and critics praised it. Show Business was the band's last album before their long-term breakup.

== Critical reception ==
Professional ratings
Review scores
Source	Rating
AllMusic	3/5 stars
Collector's Guide to Heavy Metal	7/10
Rolling Stone	3/5 stars

Rolling Stone wrote that "there remains something oddly lovable about this goofy group of hard-rock power popsters who seem to have been going at it forever with only limited commercial success." The Deseret News deemed the album "light-hearted rock with lots of innuendo but not much substance."

== Track listing ==
1. "Ball Baby" (Purnell, Bob Halligan Jr., Martin Briley) – 4:46
2. "9-1-1" (Purnell, John Palumbo) – 4:38
3. "Fireballs" (Purnell, Halligan Jr.) – 4:08
4. "Baby Time Bomb" (Purnell, Taylor Rhodes) – 4:22
5. "Book to Hypnotize" (Purnell) – 4:07
6. "Put My Money Where Your Mouth Is" (Purnell, Steve Whiteman) – 5:21
7. "She Loves Me Not" (Purnell, Halligan Jr.) – 7:23
8. "Fire Boy" (Purnell, Palumbo) – 3:23
9. "I'm Bombed" (Purnell, Palumbo) – 5:07
10. "If You Run Around" (Purnell) – 4:23

== Credits ==
Kix

- Steve Whiteman – lead vocals, harmonica, saxophone
- Ronnie "10/10" Younkins – guitars
- Brian "Damage" Forsythe – guitars
- Donnie Purnell – bass, keyboards, backing vocals, producer, mixing
- Jimmy "Chocolate" Chalfant – drums, percussion, backing vocals, engineer

Additional musicians

- Paul Chalfant – viola on "If You Run Around"

Production

- Zac Mabie – engineer
- George Marino – mastering at Sterling Sound, New York
- Sean Simmers – photography
