= Monster Ballads Volume 2 =

Compilation album by Various artists
- Released: February 20, 2001
- Genre: Heavy metal Glam metal Hard rock Soft rock
- Label: Razor & Tie

Monster Ballads chronology
Monster Ballads (1999)	Monster Ballads Volume 2 (2001)	Monster Ballads: Platinum Edition (2005)

Professional ratings
Review scores
Source	Rating
Allmusic	link

Monster Ballads Volume 2 is the sequel to Monster Ballads. Like its predecessor, it is a compilation album of many power ballads.

== Track listing ==
1. "I Won't Forget You" - Poison - 3:38
2. "Love of a Lifetime" - FireHouse - 4:50
3. "When the Children Cry" - White Lion - 4:21
4. "Miles Away" - Winger - 4:13
5. "Love Is on the Way" - Saigon Kick - 4:27
6. "More Than Words Can Say" - Alias - 3:55
7. "Sometimes She Cries" - Warrant - 4:46
8. "House of Pain" - Faster Pussycat - 5:48
9. "Price of Love" - Bad English - 4:49
10. "Only Time Will Tell" - Nelson - 4:19
11. "Amanda" - Boston - 4:19
12. "The Ballad of Jayne" - L.A. Guns - 4:36
13. "Eyes Without a Face" - Billy Idol - 4:11
14. "This Could Be the Night" - Loverboy - 5:00
15. "Honestly" - Stryper - 4:08
16. "Can't Fight This Feeling" - REO Speedwagon - 4:48
