= Rock Your Face Off =

Studio album by Kix
- Released: August 5, 2014
- Genre: Hard rock; glam metal
- Label: Loud and Proud Records
- Producer: Taylor Rhodes

Kix chronology
Show Business (1995)	Rock Your Face Off (2014)

Rock Your Face Off is the seventh and final studio album by American hard rock band KIX. It is KIX's first studio release in 19 years since their 1995 album Show Business. It is the band's only studio release with bassist Mark Schenker replacing the band's primary songwriter Donnie Purnell. Producer Taylor Rhodes co-wrote three of the album's songs, while former Funny Money guitarist Rob Galpin and Craig Stegall also get co-writing credits.

The album debuted at #48 on the Billboard Top 200, the second highest charting record ever for KIX next to 'Blow My Fuse'. It also debuted at #1 on the Amazon Rock chart and remained there for over four weeks.

== Track listing ==
1. Wheels in Motion (3:34) – (M. Schenker/R. Galpin/C. Stegall)
2. You're Gone (4:25) – (Schenker/Galpin/Stegall/S. Whiteman)
3. Can't Stop the Show (4:38) – (Schenker/T. Rhodes)
4. Rollin' in Honey (4:18) – (Schenker/Rhodes)
5. Rock Your Face Off (3:30) – (B. Forsythe/Schenker/Whiteman)
6. All the Right Things (4:04) – (Schenker/Forsythe)
7. Dirty Girls (4:15) – (Whiteman/Forsythe)
8. Inside Outside Inn (4:04) – (Whiteman/Schenker/Galpin)
9. Mean Miss Adventure (3:36) – (Schenker/Galpin/Stegall)
10. Love Me with Your Top Down (3:44) – (Schenker/K. Scofield/Rhodes)
11. Tail on the Wag (3:40) – (Whiteman/Forsythe)
12. Rock & Roll Showdown (3:47) – (Schenker/Galpin/Stegall/Whiteman)

== Personnel ==
- Steve Whiteman – Lead Vocals, Harmonica
- Ronnie "10-10" Younkins – Rhythm Guitar
- Brian "Damage" Forsythe – Lead Guitar
- Mark Schenker – Bass Guitar, Backing Vocals
- Jimmy "Chocolate" Chalfant – Drums, Percussion, Backing Vocals

== Charts ==
Chart (2014)	Peak position
US Billboard 200	49
US Independent Albums (Billboard)	5
US Top Hard Rock Albums (Billboard)	5
US Top Rock Albums (Billboard)	17
