= Chris McLernon =

American musician

- Instruments: Bass, guitar, keyboards, vocals

Chris McLernon is an American musician who is best known as the bassist of the band Saigon Kick from 1992–1997, 2012-2015, 2017-2023.

Before joining Saigon Kick Chris played in Cold Sweat and the premiere Kiss tribute band Cold Gin, which also featured one time Cold Sweat band-mate Anthony White, Black 'N Blue vocalist extraordinaire Jaime St. James and current Kiss member Tommy Thayer.

Joining Saigon Kick in July 1992, McLernon replaced Tom Defile as their second album The Lizard hit the stores. Saigon Kick then toured non-stop for the next eleven months, as the single "Love Is On The Way" and The Lizard album both went gold.

McLernon then recorded with the band on their third album Water, in Stockholm, Sweden and Tampa, Florida.

Water had three number one singles in Indonesia, leading to a sold-out tour in 1994. The follow-up Devil in the Details was recorded in Tampa, Florida and released in 1995. It also charted globally leading to another successful tour of the Pacific Rim and Europe.

After Saigon Kick, Chris went on to develop a company called McLernon MultiMedia that has placed music with all of the major broadcast and cable networks, major advertising firms and indie films. He also fronts a surf instrumental band called Big Mick and The Curl which has charted internationally and heard in the Showtime program Homeland.

Chris also played guitar, sang and produced Mother Mary with vocalist Robert Basauri (Red Sea, Die Happy), pianist Vince Gilbert (The Cult, D’Priest) and drummer Rick Sanders (Saigon Kick, Super Transatlantic).

On May 7, 2019, it was announced that Cold Sweat was reuniting with all original members on the 2020 Monsters of Rock Cruise. They also played The Monsters On The Mountain Festival in 2022 to rave reviews. Cold Sweat performed at the 15th Anniversary of the M3 Festival in 2024.

In 2023, Chris formed Kinell with Collin DeBruhl, and released their first record: "Crash. Burn. Rebirth.". That album also features Barry Kerch (Shinedown), Marc Danziesen (Little Caesar) and Rick Sanders (Saigon Kick, Super Transatlantic) on drums. It was mixed by Eric Bass (Shinedown). Kinell has recorded the follow-up album in Charleston, South Carolina for release in 2026.

In late 2023 McLernon announced that he was diagnosed with Parkinson's disease. He had a Deep Brain Stimulation device installed in time to play the M3 Festival. Undaunted and encouraged, he plans to play more shows, create and produce new music.

In 2024, Cold Sweat released a new record, Unburied Alive, (produced by Chris) of post MCA demos and live tracks recorded on the 2020 Monsters of Rock cruise. 2025 saw Chris produce an album by The Fifth, for RFK Media.

== Discography ==
=== With Cold Sweat ===
- Break Out (1990)
- Unburied Alive (2024)

=== Saigon Kick ===
- Water (1993)
- Devil In The Details (1995)
- Bastards (1997)
