= Hot Wire (Kix album) =

Studio album by Kix
- Released: July 9, 1991
- Studio: Music Grinder and Sunset Sound Recorders, Hollywood, California
- Genre: Hard rock; glam metal
- Length: 46:08
- Label: East West
- Producer: Kix, Taylor Rhodes

Kix chronology
| Blow My Fuse (1988) | Hot Wire (1991) | Live (1993) |

Singles from Hot Wire
- 1. "Hot Wire" Released: 1991; 2. "Girl Money" Released: 1991; 3. "Tear Down the Walls" Released: 1991; 4. "Same Jane" Released: 1991

Professional ratings
Review scores
| Source | Rating |
|---|---|
| AllMusic | 4/5 stars |
| Robert Christgau | (choice cut) |
| Collector's Guide to Heavy Metal | 6/10 |
| Entertainment Weekly | (B−) |

Hot Wire is the fifth studio album by American hard rock band Kix. It was released on July 9, 1991, by East West Records.

== Overview ==
Hot Wire peaked at number 64 on the Billboard 200 in October 1991. It failed to match the sales of Kix's previous album, Blow My Fuse, selling slightly over 200,000 copies. Producer Taylor Rhodes co-wrote five of the albums' ten songs with Donnie Purnell (the only Kix member credited as a songwriter). At the same time, Crack the Sky member John Palumbo and songwriter Bob Halligan Jr. (Judas Priest, Kiss, Icon, Blue Öyster Cult) got two co-writing credits each.

== Track listing ==
1. "Hot Wire" (Donnie Purnell, Taylor Rhodes) – 5:22
2. "Girl Money" (Purnell, Rhodes) – 3:58
3. "Luv-a-Holic" (Purnell) – 4:39
4. "Tear Down the Walls" (Purnell, Rhodes) – 4:35
5. "Bump the La La" (Purnell, Rhodes) – 3:28
6. "Rock & Roll Overdose" (Purnell, Rhodes) – 4:29
7. "Cold Chills" (Purnell, Bob Halligan Jr.) – 5:19
8. "Same Jane" (Purnell, Halligan Jr.) – 4:33
9. "Pants on Fire (Liar, Liar)" (Purnell, John Palumbo) – 4:12
10. "Hee Bee Jee Bee Crush" (Purnell, Palumbo) – 5:33

== Personnel ==
Kix

- Steve Whiteman – lead vocals, harmonica, saxophone, acoustic guitar on "Tear Down the Walls"
- Ronnie "10/10" Younkins – rhythm guitar
- Brian "Damage" Forsythe – lead guitar
- Donnie Purnell – bass guitar, keyboards, backing vocals, mixing on tracks 1–4, 6–9
- Jimmy "Chocolate" Chalfant – drums, percussion, backing vocals

Production

- Taylor Rhodes – producer on tracks 3, 5, 6, 8, co-producer on tracks 1, 2, 4, mixing on tracks 1–4, 6–9
- Eddie DeLena – engineer, mixing on tracks 5, 10
- Lawrence Ethan, Neal Avron – additional engineering
- George Marino – mastering at Sterling Sound, New York
- Hugh Syme – art direction, design
- John Scarpati, Mike Hashimoto – photography

== Charts ==
| Chart (1991) | Peak position |
|---|---|
| Japanese Albums (Oricon) | 37 |
| US Billboard 200 | 64 |
