= Matt Kramer =

Matt Kramer may refer to:

- Matt Kramer (musician), American singer formerly with rock band Saigon Kick
- Matt Kramer (wine writer), American wine writer
