= Wild America =

Wild America may refer to:

- Wild America (TV series), a science documentary series focusing on animal life
- Wild America (film), a 1997 American adventure comedy film
- Wild America (album), an album by the rock group Tora Tora
- "Wild America", a song from the Iggy Pop album American Caesar
