= Monster Ballads =

Compilation album by Various artists
- Released: June 29, 1999
- Genres: Glam metal, hard rock, pop rock, soft rock
- Label: Razor & Tie

Monster Ballads chronology
Monster Ballads (1999)	Monster Ballads Volume 2 (2001)

Professional ratings
Review scores
Source	Rating
AllMusic	4/5 stars

Monster Ballads is the first in a series of compilation albums that feature a combination of many popular and lesser-known power ballads, usually from the glam metal and soft rock genres, many of which charted in the Top 10 or Top 20 of the Billboard Hot 100. Like Monsters of Rock, it was released in both single and 2 disc versions, which were heavily promoted by TV commercials. The single disc version (containing 16 songs) was eventually certified platinum by the RIAA in 1999, while the 2 disc version (containing 35 songs) was certified gold that same year.

== Original single-disc release ==
1. "Heaven" - Warrant - 3:59
2. "Something to Believe In" - Poison - 5:31
3. "High Enough" [single version] - Damn Yankees - 4:19
4. "Almost Paradise" - Mike Reno and Ann Wilson - 3:46
5. "Is This Love" - Whitesnake - 4:42
6. "To Be with You" - Mr. Big - 3:27
7. "Carrie" - Europe - 4:32
8. "Don't Know What You Got (Till It's Gone)" - Cinderella - 5:55
9. "More Than Words" [single version] - Extreme - 4:11
10. "Headed for a Heartbreak" - Winger - 5:14
11. "When I Look into Your Eyes" - Firehouse - 4:00
12. "Wind of Change" - Scorpions - 5:10
13. "I'll Never Let You Go (Angel Eyes)" - Steelheart - 5:06
14. "When I See You Smile" - Bad English - 4:21
15. "Don't Close Your Eyes" - KIX - 4:18
16. "When I'm with You" - Sheriff - 3:55

== Double-disc edition ==
=== Disc 1 ===
1. "Heaven" - Warrant - 3:59
2. "Something to Believe In" - Poison - 5:31
3. "When I See You Smile" - Bad English - 4:09
4. "Don't Know What You Got (Till It's Gone)" [single version] - Cinderella - 4:30
5. "Love Is on the Way" - Saigon Kick - 4:25
6. "Headed for a Heartbreak" [single version] - Winger - 4:18
7. "When I'm with You" - Sheriff - 3:55
8. "Carrie" - Europe - 4:32
9. "I'll Never Let You Go (Angel Eyes)" - Steelheart - 5:06
10. "High Enough" [single version] - Damn Yankees - 4:19
11. "The Ballad of Jayne" - L.A. Guns - 4:33
12. "Goodbye" - Night Ranger - 4:18
13. "Can't Fight This Feeling" - REO Speedwagon - 4:50
14. "This Could Be the Night" - Loverboy - 4:59
15. "Never Tear Us Apart" - INXS - 3:05
16. "Second Chance" [single version] - 38 Special - 4:35
17. "Eternal Flame" - The Bangles - 3:55

=== Disc 2 ===
1. "Is This Love" - Whitesnake - 4:42
2. "To Be with You" - Mr. Big - 3:27
3. "Wind of Change" - The Scorpions - 5:10
4. "More Than Words" - Extreme - 5:06
5. "When I Look Into Your Eyes" - Firehouse - 4:00
6. "The Angel Song" - Great White - 4:51
7. "Eyes Without a Face" - Billy Idol - 4:58
8. "Don't Close Your Eyes" - KIX - 4:18
9. "Almost Paradise" - Mike Reno and Ann Wilson - 3:46
10. "Amanda" - Boston - 4:16
11. "House of Pain" - Faster Pussycat - 5:47
12. "More Than Words Can Say" - Alias - 3:53
13. "Honestly" - Stryper - 4:10
14. "Missing You" - John Waite - 4:30
15. "Only Time Will Tell" - Nelson - 4:15
16. "Waiting for a Girl Like You" - Foreigner - 4:49
17. "Take Me Home Tonight / Be My Baby" - Eddie Money - 3:32
18. "Don't Walk Away" - Danger Danger - 4:56
