= Phil Varone =

American drummer

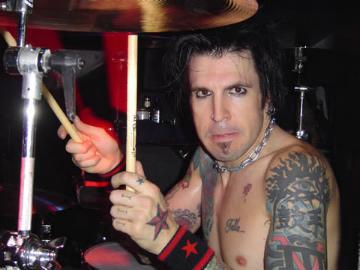

Background information
- Born: October 15, 1967 (age 58); Long Island, New York, U.S.
- Genres: Hard rock, glam metal
- Occupations: Musician, television personality
- Instruments: Drums
- Member of: Saigon Kick
- Formerly of: Prunella Scales; Skid Row

Phil Varone (born October 15, 1967) is an American drummer. He is a founding and current member of the rock band Saigon Kick from 1988 to 1996, from 2012 to 2015, and again since 2024. While out of Saigon Kick for several years, some of which Saigon Kick was not active, he played for Prunella Scales, Skid Row, and Vince Neil.

== Career ==
=== Music ===
Varone began playing in various local bands while still in high school in Fort Lauderdale. In 1988, he joined together with some of his friends and formed Saigon Kick. The band signed a recording contract with Atlantic Records after two years. They earned a Gold Record for the album, The Lizard as well as a Billboard top 10 single for the song, "Love is On the Way". In 1996, Saigon Kick disbanded and Varone stayed busy producing and doing studio work for a variety of artists.

In 2000, Varone joined multi-platinum recording artists Skid Row. Together they toured the world with Kiss, Poison, Def Leppard and Tesla; along the way, they recorded a new record, Thickskin. Additionally, the band produced Under the Skin: The Making of Thickskin, which was internationally distributed on DVD.

In 2003, Varone played drums for Vince Neil of Mötley Crüe on his solo tour.

Varone joined Jake E. Lee's band Red Dragon Cartel for the recording of their sophomore album Patina. The album was released in November 2018.

=== Television, film and radio ===
When Varone left the music business in 2004 he decided to pursue a career in acting and stand up comedy. Varone appeared as a celebrity customer in an episode of Miami Ink, in which he got a tattoo of his son's name. He also appeared in episodes of the Showtime series Californication, and the CBS series Numbers. Varone appeared the E! program Inside Celebrity Rehabs, the NBC game show Identity, in which he was correctly matched to his identity as a rock and roll drummer, and on an episode of Celebrity Ghost Stories on the BIO Channel. He also appeared in an Asian Nokia TV commercial.

Varone produced and starred in the acclaimed 2007 feature-length documentary, Waking Up Dead, in which a film crew followed him around for several years to document his life as a touring drummer.

In April 2009, Varone participated in Sex Rehab with Dr. Drew, a VH1 spinoff of Celebrity Rehab with Dr. Drew that features celebrities being rehabilitated for sex addiction. In the first episode, Varone revealed that his sex addiction worsened after his mother died from a cerebral aneurysm in 1998. Another pivotal moment occurred when his maternal grandmother Josephine died during the taping of the show. Varone also spoke about this sex addiction in episodes of Oprah, The Tyra Banks Show and the Today Show.

In the September 26, 2010, episode of Strange Sex on the Discovery Health Channel Varone and his girlfriend, Achsha, discussed Phil's sex addiction and recovery and how it related to their new relationship.

=== Book ===
In April 2013 Un-Philtered: Real Life On and Off the Rock'n'Roll Tour Bus, a tell-all memoir of his days on the road, was published by Riverdale Avenue Books.

=== Other work ===
Varone was Playgirl magazine's cover and centerfold for December 2010, in which he appeared to promote the launch of the Sex Stand Up Rock And Roll Show tour in the United States.

In July 2011 Vivid Entertainment released Phil Varone's Secret Sex Stash video as part of their celebrity sex tape series. He has gone on to produce and direct a series for Vivid Entertainment called 100% Real Swingers. Varone has a second series of reality porn videos called Groupies: The Music from Behind, a takeoff on VH1's Behind the Music series.

Varone has his own line of sex toys with California Exotic Novelties, including the first ever rockstar mold and pierced dildo.

== Discography ==
=== With Saigon Kick ===
- Saigon Kick (1991)
- The Lizard (1992)
- Water (1993)
- Devil in the Details (1995)
- Greatest Mrs.: The Best of Saigon Kick (1998)
- Moments From The Fringe (1998)
- Bastards (1999)
- Greatest Hits Live (2000)
- Live Around The World 1991–1996 (2007)

=== With Prunella Scales ===
- Dressing Up the Idiot (1997)

=== With Skid Row ===
- Thickskin (2003)

=== With Red Dragon Cartel ===
- Patina (2018)

== Awards and nominations ==
- 2012 AVN Award nominee – Best Celebrity Sex Tape
- 2012 AVN Award nominee – Best Marketing Campaign
- 2013 AVN Award nominee – Best Celebrity Sex Tape – Phil Varone's Swinging American Style: Texas F*ck 'em
- 2013 AVN Award nominee – Best Celebrity Sex Tape – Phil Varone's Swinging American Style: Vegas or Bust!
- 2013 AVN Award nominee – Best New Series – Swinging American Style
- 2014 XBIZ Award nominee – Best Pro Am Release – 100% Real Swingers: Big Bear
- 2014 AVN Award nominee – Best Amateur Series – 100% Real Swingers
- 2014 AVN Award winner – Best Amateur Release – 100% Real Swingers: Meet the Riley's
- 2015 XBIZ Award nominee – Amateur Release of the Year – 100% Real Swingers: Tampa
- 2015 XBIZ Award nominee – Amateur Release of the Year – 100% Real Swingers: Kentucky
- 2015 AVN Award nominee – Amateur Release of the Year – 100% Teen Swingers: Atlanta
- 2015 AVN Award nominee – Amateur Release of the Year – 100% Real Swingers: Kentucky
- 2015 AVN Award nominee – Best Amateur/Pro Am Series – 100% Real Swingers
