= Some Heads Are Gonna Roll =

Single by Judas Priest

from the album Defenders of the Faith
- B-side: "The Green Manalishi (With The Two-Pronged Crown) (Live)"
- Released: 19 March 1984
- Genre: Heavy metal
- Length: 4:05
- Label: Columbia
- Songwriter: Bob Halligan Jr.
- Producer: Tom Allom

Judas Priest singles chronology
"Love Bites" (1984)	"Some Heads Are Gonna Roll" (1984)	"Turbo Lover" (1986)

"Some Heads Are Gonna Roll" is a song by the English heavy metal band Judas Priest. It was originally released on their 1984 studio album, Defenders of the Faith, and issued as a single later that year.

== Background ==
"Some Heads Are Gonna Roll" was included on The Best of Judas Priest: Living After Midnight, which was not endorsed by the band. The tune itself was composed by Bob Halligan Jr., of the band Ceili Rain.

The first half of the guitar solo is played by Glenn Tipton and the second half is played by K. K. Downing.

The EP's B-side is a live version of "The Green Manalishi (With the Two Prong Crown)", recorded at the US Festival, Glen Helen Park, near Devore, San Bernardino in California on 29 May 1983 in front of an audience of approximately 375,000 people. It also includes the studio version of "Jawbreaker" from the Defenders of the Faith album.

The song was on the 2001 Clear Channel memorandum banned songs-list after 9/11.

== Covers ==
"Some Heads Are Gonna Roll" was covered by American rock band Fight or Flight on the deluxe edition of their debut album, A Life by Design?.

== Personnel ==
- Rob Halford – vocals
- K. K. Downing – guitar
- Glenn Tipton – guitar
- Ian Hill – bass
- Dave Holland – drums

== Charts ==
Chart (1984)	Peak position
UK Singles (OCC)	97
US Mainstream Rock (Billboard)	42
