= Steve Whiteman =

American singer (born 1956)

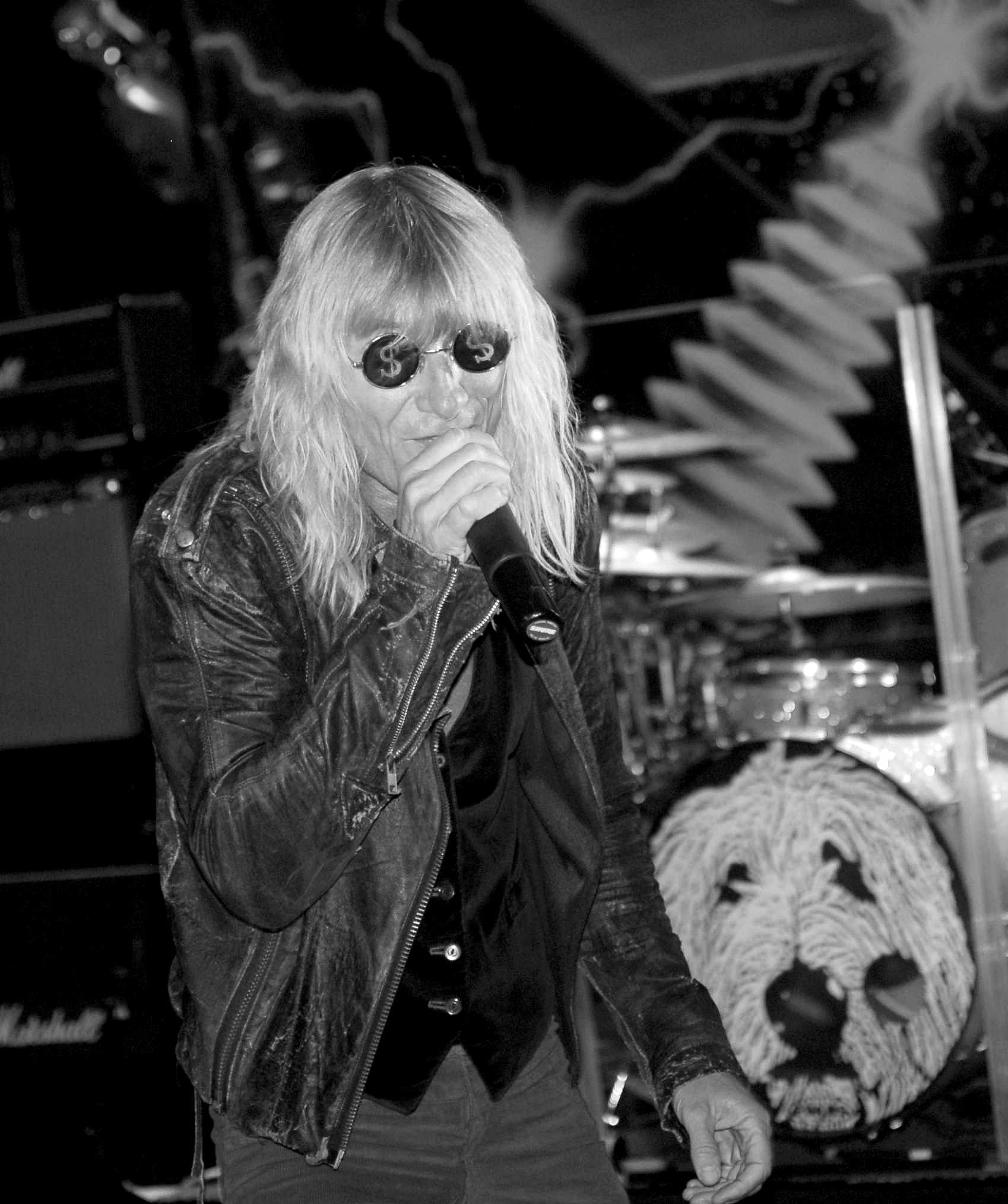
- Whiteman with Funny Money in 2010

Background information
- Born: August 28, 1956 (age 69) Piedmont, West Virginia, U.S.
- Genres: Hard rock, glam metal
- Occupation(s): Singer, musician
- Instrument(s): Vocals, harmonica, drums, percussion, saxophone, guitar
- Years active: 1969–2023
- Member of: Kix, Funny Money

Steve Whiteman (born August 28, 1956) is an American rock vocalist, best known for being the lead singer of Kix.

== Biography ==
=== Early years ===
Whiteman first realized his love for music at a young age. As a child, he would hurry home from church to play, by ear, the hymns he had heard during Sunday service. He started his music career playing drums in a Led Zeppelin cover band.

=== Kix ===
Whiteman was recruited to join Kix in 1978 while they were known as "The Shooze". Whiteman and then-drummer Donnie Spence would alternate between who would drum and who would sing until it was decided that since Whiteman could hit the harder notes that he should stay as lead singer, Spence would soon leave in 1979 and be replaced by current-drummer Jimmy "Chocolate" Chalfant. The group has released seven studio albums and one live album with Whiteman on vocals, the band went on hiatus in 1996 due to growing tensions within the band, a decline in the popularity of hard rock, and declining record sales of their album $how Bu$ine$$. Over the past 30 years he has been instrumental in keeping the band together during various personnel changes.

=== Funny Money and teaching ===
Funny Money was formed by Whiteman and guitarist Billy Andrews after they met at a charity gig in 1996 after Kix disbanded, the group has released four studio albums and one live album since its formation and currently consists of Whiteman, Dean Cramer (one of Whiteman's vocal students), and fellow Kix alumni Jimmy Chalfant and Mark Schenker. Whiteman also took the downtime from Kix to begin a teaching career, he would go on to teach vocals, drums, guitar, and harmonica at the Maryland Institute of Music, his vocal students include Jordan White and Lzzy Hale of Halestorm.

=== Reforming Kix ===
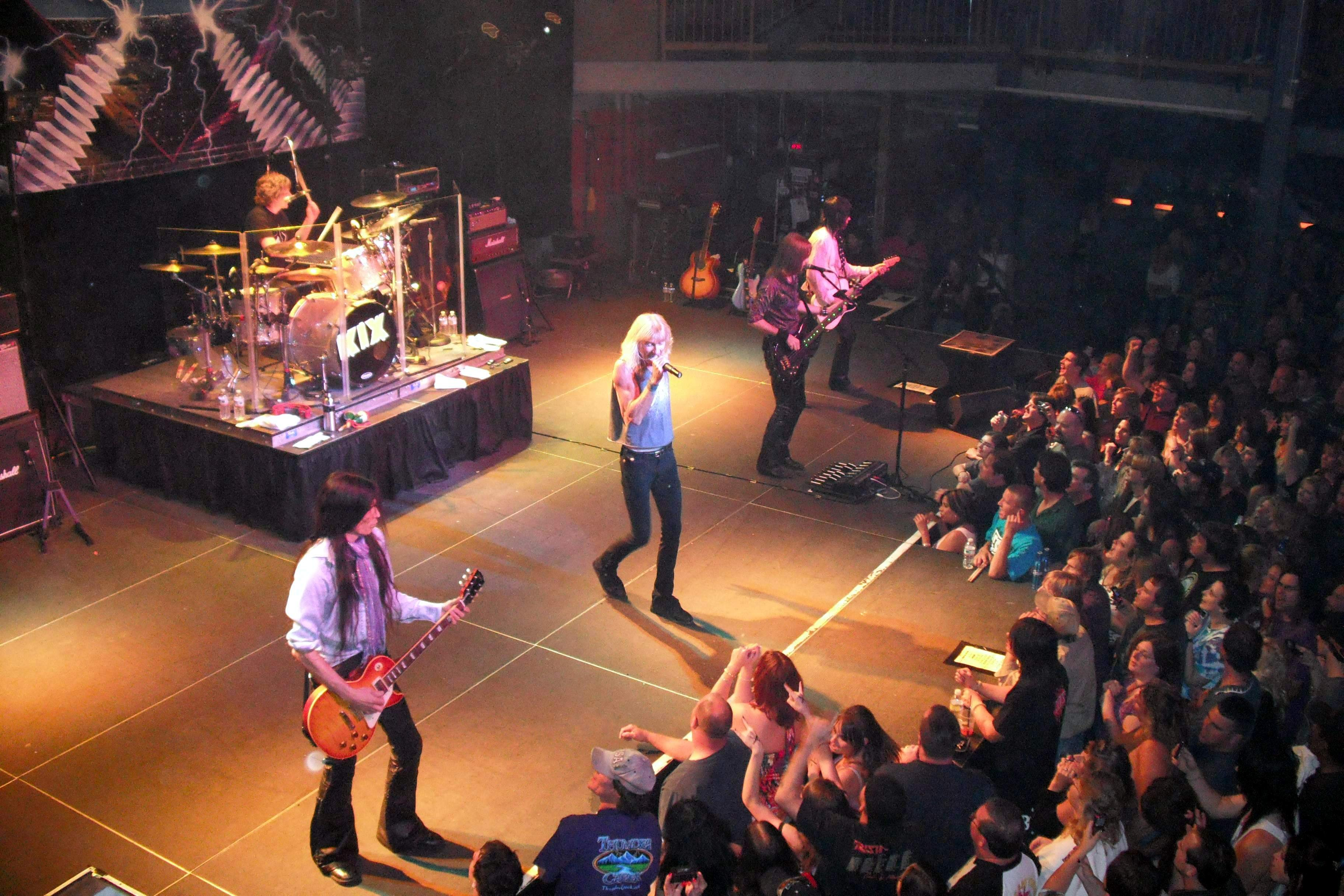
Whiteman with Kix in 2009

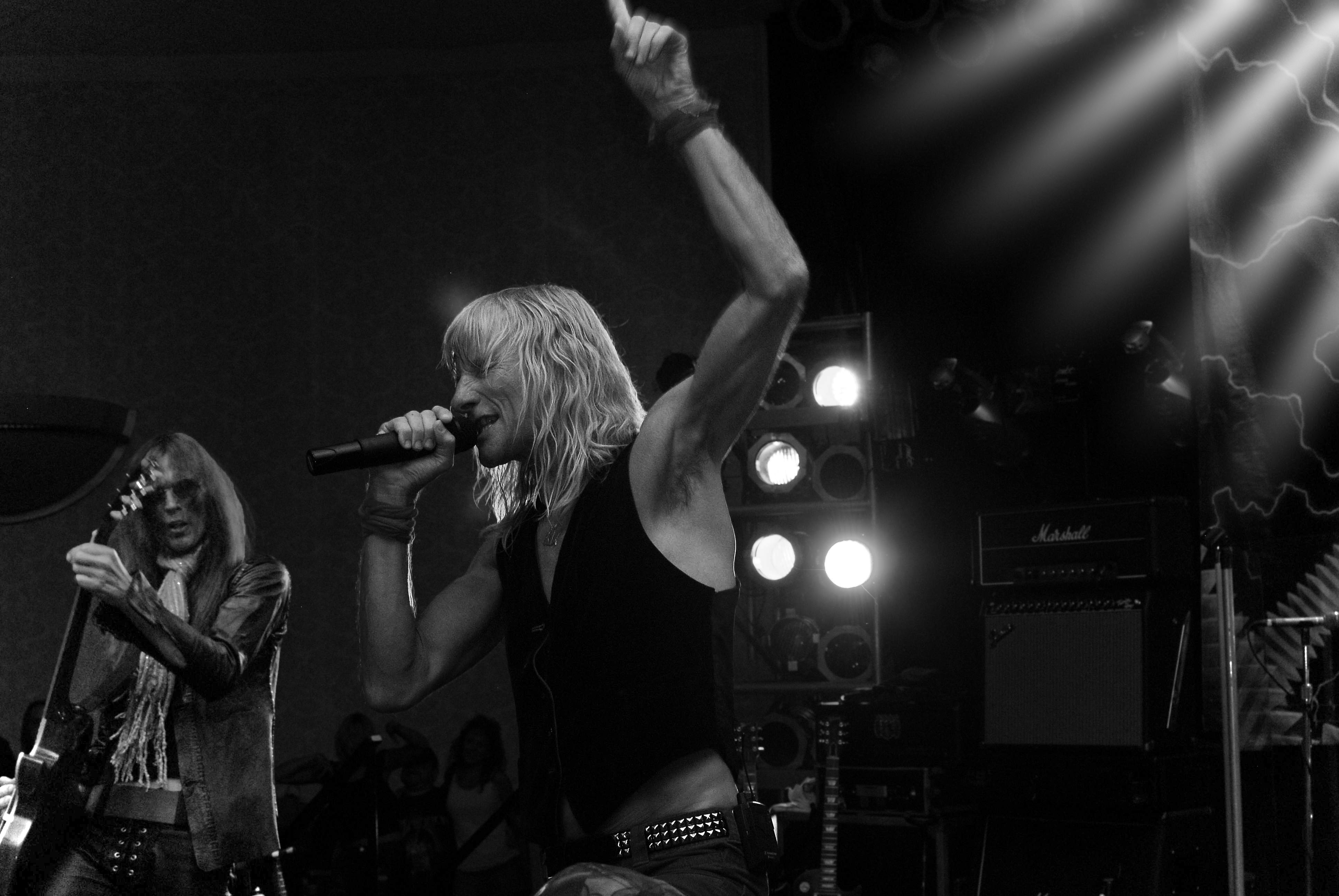
Whiteman performing with Kix in 2010

In 2003, the members of Kix, sans Donnie Purnell, reformed with bassist, vocalist and songwriter Mark Schenker (originally from Centerfold) and has since released the critically acclaimed Rock Your Face Off in 2014. This had led to a resurgence in the band's popularity and they maintain an active touring schedule throughout the country. Although back with Kix and on a regular tour schedule, Steve Whiteman, as well as Jimmy Chalfant and Brian Forsythe, are all instructors at the Maryland Institute of Music L.L.C. Whiteman's daughter, Carly, is also an instructor of vocals and piano there.

== Discography ==
Over his career, Whiteman has released 12 studio albums and 1 live album.

=== Solo ===
Studio album

- You're Welcome (2021)

=== With Kix ===
==== Studio albums ====
- Kix (1981)
- Cool Kids (1983)
- Midnite Dynamite (1985)
- Blow My Fuse (1988)
- Hot Wire (1991)
- $how Bu$ine$$ (1995)
- Rock Your Face Off (2014)

==== Live albums ====
- Live (1993)
- Live In Baltimore (2012)

=== With Funny Money ===
==== Studio albums ====
- Funny Money (1998)
- Back Again (1999)
- Skin To Skin (2003)
- Stick It! (2006)

==== Live albums ====
- Even Better... Live (2001)

=== Guest appearances ===
- Twisted Sister – Love Is For Suckers (1987)
- Monster Metal Power Ballads (2006 — track "Still Loving You" (Scorpions cover), credited as "Still Lovin' You"
- Leppardmania: A Tribute to Def Leppard (2000 — track "Foolin'" (Def Leppard cover), credited as "Foolin'"
- Best of Both Worlds: A Tribute to Van Halen (2003 – track "There's Only One Way to Rock" (Sammy Hagar cover)
- The Song Remains Remixed – A Tribute to Led Zeppelin (1999 – track "Immigrant Song" (Led Zeppelin cover)
- Monster Ballads: Platinum Edition (2006, retail version — track "Don't Close Your Eyes")
- Monster Ballads: Platinum Edition (2005, exclusive version — track "Don't Close Your Eyes")
- Monster Ballads (1999 — track "Don't Close Your Eyes")

== Videography ==
- Blow My Fuse: The Videos (1989)
- Can't Stop the Show – The Return of KIX – A Documentary (2016)
