= Water (Saigon Kick album) =

Studio album by Saigon Kick
- Released: September 28, 1993
- Recorded: May–July 1993
- Studio: Soundtrade (Solna, Sweden); Morrisound (Tampa, Florida)
- Genre: Hard rock
- Length: 52:19
- Label: Third Stone/Atlantic
- Producer: Jason Bieler

Saigon Kick chronology
The Lizard (1992)	Water (1993)	Devil in the Details (1995)

Singles from Water
- 1. "I Love You" Released: 1993; 2. "Space Oddity" Released: 1993

Water is the third album of American rock band Saigon Kick, released on September 28, 1993, through Third Stone/Atlantic. It is the first Saigon Kick album to feature guitarist Jason Bieler on lead vocals, and bassist Chris McLernon. Singer Matt Kramer left the band in the same year.

== Release ==
As the follow-up album to The Lizard, Saigon Kick dropped from a four- to a three-piece, with guitarist Jason Bieler taking over the vocal chores from the departed Matt Kramer (they initially had a vocal styling of Alice in Chains arrangement, with Bieler singing many vocal parts and harmonies before this, so it did not sound drastically different with the exception of the fact Bieler was now singing lead vocals). Also at this time, bassist Tom DeFile left and was replaced by Chris McLernon. Musical differences’ got in the way of the third Saigon Kick album, so vocalist Kramer and bassist Defile departed. Leaving Bieler to take over on vocals, who wrote all the songs (except "Space Oddity" a cover of a David Bowie song) as well as produced.

== Critical reception ==
Professional ratings
Review scores
Source	Rating
AllMusic	3/5 stars

Billboard gave the single "I Love You" a mixed review, writing "only a crisp guitar solo midway through the song saves it from Hallmark oblivion." While originally planned to be promoted to both Contemporary Hit Radio and Album Rock radio, the record label pivoted and promoted the track "One Step Closer" to the rock stations shortly thereafter. "I Love You" was added to 34 Radio & Records Contemporary stations, but did not chart on the Billboard Hot 100.

== Track listing ==
All tracks are written by Jason Bieler, except where noted

No.	Title	Writer(s)	Length
1.	"One Step Closer"		3:51
2.	"Space Oddity"	David Bowie	5:22
3.	"Water"		4:58
4.	"Torture"		3:44
5.	"Fields of Rape"		4:44
6.	"I Love You"		3:38
7.	"Sgt. Steve"		2:10
8.	"My Heart"		3:48
9.	"On and On"		3:26
10.	"The Way"		4:56
11.	"Sentimental Girl"		2:35
12.	"Close to You"		3:35
13.	"When You Were Mine"		3:58
14.	"Reprise"		1:34

Japanese release and 2018 reissue bonus track
No.	Title	Length
15.	"Not Enough"

== Personnel ==
=== Saigon Kick ===
- Phil Varone – drums, cover concept
- Jason Bieler – vocals, guitar, piano, keyboard, bass, programming, production, cover concept
- Chris McLernon – bass, backing vocals, guitar, cover concept

=== Additional musicians ===
- Basil Rodriguez – string arrangement (track number 13), trumpet (11)
- Richard Drexler – piano (13)
- RMM Community Choir – choir (3)
- Keith Jacobs – RMM Community Choir director (3)

=== Technical personnel ===
- Ronny Lahti – engineering, mixing, additional backing vocals (5, 6)
- Tom Morris – assistant engineering
- Jim Morris – assistant engineering
- Mike Fuller – mastering
- Sheila Rock – photography
- Allen Hori – art direction
- Richard Bates – art direction
- Derek Oliver – 2018 reissue liner notes
