= Surprise Attack (album) =

1989 hard rock album by Tora Tora

Studio album by Tora Tora
- Released: May 1989
- Recorded: 1987–1989
- Studios: Ardent Studios, Memphis, Tennessee
- Genres: Hard rock; blues rock; glam metal
- Length: 38:47
- Label: A&M Records
- Producers: Joe Hardy, Paul Ebersold (Ardent Productions)

Tora Tora chronology
Surprise Attack (1989)	Wild America (1991)

Singles from Surprise Attack
- 1. "Walkin' Shoes" / "Love's a Bitch" Released: July 1989; 2. "Guilty" Released: 1989; 3. "Phantom Rider" / "One for the Road" Released: 1989

Surprise Attack is the debut studio album by American hard rock band Tora Tora, released in May 1989 through A&M Records. The album peaked at #47 on the Billboard 200 U.S. album sales chart.

The album's lead single, "Walkin' Shoes," achieved minor chart success and moderate airplay. Other singles included "Guilty" and "Phantom Rider."

== Background ==
=== History and songwriting ===
In June 1987, Tora Tora won a "Battle of the Bands" competition with a prize permitting the winner to spend one day recording in Ardent Studios, a recording studio in the band's hometown of Memphis, Tennessee. The recording session produced a few songs that the band would ultimately release on an EP, To Rock to Roll, in 1987. After recording those initial songs, Tora Tora returned to Ardent Studios in September to record "Phantom Rider," the original version of which included a piano section performed by Paul Ebersold, who would later produce Surprise Attack. Another song produced during those early sessions that would later appear on Surprise Attack was "Love's a Bitch." Both songs received considerable airplay on a local Memphis-based radio station prior to the band receiving their record deal from A&M Records.

When it came to songwriting, guitarist Keith Douglas cited Memphis blues as an influence on some of the songs that ended up on Surprise Attack. Douglas stated that he taught himself riffs associated with the genre and that one of those riffs eventually developed into "Walkin' Shoes," which was one of the last songs written for the album. Lead singer Anthony Corder received help from a friend named Thomas Howard in writing some of the album's songs, including "Hard Times," "Phantom Rider," and "She's Good, She's Bad."

The band wrote at least 60 songs that did not make it onto the final Surprise Attack track listing; in October 2009, Tora Tora released compilations containing at least 15 of those songs. One of the songs released was a demo of "Walkin' Shoes" recorded prior to the one that wound up on Surprise Attack.

=== Production ===
Production of Surprise Attack took almost one year. Surprise Attack was produced by Joe Hardy and Paul Ebersold, who were both associated with Ardent Studios. Hardy was more experienced and had previously worked with ZZ Top, while Surprise Attack was one of Ebersold's first projects, as he was relatively new to Ardent at the time. In a 2021 interview, Corder credited Hardy and Ebersold for their patience working with the band as they were inexperienced with studios, as well as for helping shape and polish the band's sound.

== Commercial performance ==
=== Promotion ===
In a 2019 interview, Corder cited the album's provocative artwork as a large factor in aiding with the band's promotion and garnering considerable press for the band. Corder stated that their record label, A&M, illustrated a full-sized poster showing more of the plane than the final album artwork, and that the label granted the band the poster to use for their artwork. Corder stated that as they toured to promote Surprise Attack, they would host ticket giveaways by claiming they were attempting to search for the identity of the woman on the cover; the label also created promotional pens with the woman's illustration on them where users of the pen could remove the woman's towel if they turned the pen upside down, and Entertainment Tonight featured a story about their pen. Said Corder, "Honestly, the album cover got a lot more attention than we did."

To promote Surprise Attack, the band toured as an opening act for the L.A. Guns. In 1990, they toured as an opening act for The Cult as part of the album's promotion.

=== Album sales and singles ===
Surprise Attack peaked at #47 on the Billboard 200 U.S. album sales chart during its 11th week on the chart, the week of September 23, 1989. Ultimately, the album spent 33 weeks on the Billboard 200 chart before exiting the week of February 24, 1990. By late March 1990, the album had sold 300,000 units and was expected to reach 500,000 sales, which would have granted it gold certification.

The album's most successful single was "Walkin' Shoes." The music video for "Walkin' Shoes" was one of the first videos from a Memphis-based artist to air on MTV, although it was technically preceded by a video for a self-titled song by Dog Police, which featured on an MTV show hosted by "Weird Al" Yankovic in 1984; however, "Walkin' Shoes" was still the first video from a Memphis-based artist to land in heavy rotation on MTV. "Walkin' Shoes" spent six weeks on the Billboard Hot 100, where it peaked at #86 in its fourth week, the week of September 2. The song also peaked at #25 on the Billboard Mainstream Rock Tracks chart.

"Guilty" was another single from the album. The band released the song as a single in 1989 and filmed a music video for the single in July 1989, with the video taking place in the United States military graveyard in Tucson, Arizona, but they did not release the video until 2018. "Phantom Rider" was released later and achieved some chart success in 1990.

== Critical reception ==
Professional ratings
Review scores
Source	Rating
AllMusic	3/5 stars

AllMusic granted the album 3 stars, albeit without writing an accompanying review.

The Commercial Appeal staff writer Ron Wynn gave the album a positive review, complimenting the band's "exuberant spirit and hard-rocking presentations" and singling out "Phantom Rider," "Walkin' Shoes," and "Guilty" as the standout tracks. Wynn did not assign the album a star rating.

A positive retrospective review from CGCM Rock Radio called the band's style "a refreshing and unique twist on the rock n' roll that I love still to this day," complimenting the way Tora Tora blended influences from southern rock with blues and hard rock.

In a mixed review, the Los Angeles Times' reviewer Jonathan Gold did not assign a star rating, but he called Surprise Attack "more ho-hum heavy metal," although he said the album "isn't really too bad, by teenage metal standards anyway."

In a negative review, Steven Miller from the Daily Utah Chronicle criticized the album for "[ripping off] various successful metal bands," having a "total lack of musical personality," and offering "utterly generic headbangers with lyrics running the gambit from partying, women and fast cars, to partying with women in fast cars." Miller also stated that he found Corder's singing style "annoying," although he singled out "Waklin' Shoes" and "Guilty," as well as the album's two ballads, "Phantom Rider," and "Being There," as the album's four standout tracks. Miller did not assign a star rating to the album.

== Track listing ==
No.	Title	Writer(s)	Length
1.	"Love's a Bitch"	Corder, Douglas, Francis, Patterson	3:51
2.	"28 Days"	Douglas, Corder	3:32
3.	"Hard Times"	Corder, T. Howard	3:10
4.	"Guilty"	T. DeLucca, Corder, Douglas, Francis, Patterson	4:40
5.	"Phantom Rider"	Corder, T. Howard	4:49
6.	"Walkin' Shoes"	Douglas, Corder, Francis, Patterson	4:01
7.	"Riverside Drive"	P. McKelvy, K. Koehler, Douglas, Corder, Francis, Patterson, Ebersold	3:39
8.	"She's Good, She's Bad"	Corder, Douglas, T. Howard, Ebersold, Koehler	3:55
9.	"One for the Road"	Douglas, Corder, Koehler	3:06
10.	"Being There"	Corder, T. Howard	4:04
Total length:			38:47

== Personnel ==
Track information and credits adapted from Discogs and AllMusic, then verified from the album's liner notes.

Tora Tora
- Anthony Corder – vocals
- Keith Douglas – guitar
- Patrick Francis – bass
- John Patterson – drums
Production
- Joe Hardy – producer, engineer
- Paul Ebersold – producer, engineer, composer
- Bob Ludwig – mastering
- Chuck Beeson – art direction
- Jeff Gold – art direction
- Mark Weiss – photography
- Michael Paras – photography
