= Jason Bieler =

- Genres: Glam metal, heavy metal, hard rock
- Occupation: Musician
- Instruments: Vocals, guitar

Jason Bieler (also often known simply as "Jason") is an American singer, guitarist and songwriter who is most famous for playing with metal band Saigon Kick.

He has also played in other bands, including an early touring version of Talisman and Super TransAtlantic, which also featured several other Saigon Kick members and Extreme bassist Pat Badger.

Bieler self-released a solo album in 1998 titled Houston, We Have a Problem.

After the demise of Super TransAtlantic, Bieler and his brother Aaron founded Bieler Bros. Records based in South Florida.

Bieler's second solo album Songs for the Apocalypse was released 21 January 2021 through Frontiers Records.

== Discography ==
=== With Saigon Kick ===
- Saigon Kick (1991)
- The Lizard (1992)
- Water (1993)
- Devil in the Details (1995)
- Moments from the Fringe (1998)
- Greatest Mrs.:The Best of Saigon Kick (1998)
- Bastards (2000)
- Greatest Hits Live (2000)

=== With Super TransAtlantic ===
- Shuttlecock (2000)

=== Solo ===
- Houston, We Have a Problem (1998)
- Where Dreams Go to Die (2018)
- Songs for the Apocalypse (2021) (released as Jason Bieler and The Baron Von Bielski Orchestra)
- Postcards from the Asylum (2023)

=== Owl Stretching ===
Jason currently has been writing/recording since 2011 in a project called Owl Stretching.
