= Midnite Dynamite =

Studio album by Kix
- Released: August 8, 1985
- Studio: Atlantic Studios, New York City
- Genre: Hard rock; glam metal
- Length: 41:04
- Label: Atlantic
- Producer: Beau Hill, Bill Dooley, Keith Lentin

Kix chronology
Cool Kids (1983)	Midnite Dynamite (1985)	Blow My Fuse (1988)

Professional ratings
Review scores
Source	Rating
AllMusic	2.5/5 stars
Collector's Guide to Heavy Metal	6/10
Kerrang!	3.5/5 stars
Music Week	3/3 stars

Midnite Dynamite is the third studio album by American hard rock band Kix, released in 1985 by Atlantic Records. It features 7 out of 10 songs co-written by bassist Donnie Purnell with hit songwriter Bob Halligan Jr. (Kiss, Judas Priest, Icon, Blue Öyster Cult). Kip Winger was credited on one song and Crack the Sky frontman John Palumbo on three. Only one other Kix member contributed to the songwriting, Steve Whiteman on "Sex".

In 2018, Collin Brennan of Consequence included the album in his list of "10 Hair Metal Albums That Don’t Suck".

== Track listing ==
Side one

1. "Midnite Dynamite" (Donnie Purnell, Bob Halligan Jr.) – 3:51
2. "Red Hot (Black & Blue)" (Purnell, Halligan Jr.) – 3:23
3. "Bang Bang (Balls of Fire)" (Kip Winger, Purnell, Halligan Jr.) – 4:00
4. "Layin' Rubber" (Purnell, Halligan Jr.) – 3:52
5. "Walkin' Away" (Purnell, Halligan Jr., John Palumbo) – 4:56

Side two

1. "Scarlet Fever" (Purnell, Halligan Jr.) – 4:20
2. "Cry Baby" (Purnell, Halligan Jr.) – 4:17
3. "Cold Shower" (Purnell, Palumbo) – 5:02
4. "Lie Like a Rug" (Purnell, Palumbo) – 3:41
5. "Sex" (Purnell, Steve Whiteman) – 3:56

== Personnel ==
Kix

- Steve Whiteman – lead vocals, harmonica ("Cold Shower" and "Sex"), saxophone
- Ronnie "10/10" Younkins – guitars
- Brian "Damage" Forsythe – guitars
- Donnie Purnell – bass, keyboards (additional keyboards on "Walkin' Away"), backing vocals, co-lead vocals on "Cold Shower"
- Jimmy "Chocolate" Chalfant – drums, percussion, backing vocals, co-lead vocals on "Cold Shower"

Additional musicians

- Anton Fig – drums, percussion on "Lie Like a Rug" and "Sex"
- Mike Slamer – guitars on "Walkin' Away" and "Scarlet Fever"
- Beau Hill – additional keyboards and guitars (courtesy of Chrysalis Records), producer, engineer

Production

- Stephen Benben, Jim Faraci – engineers
- Keith Lentin – producer on "Lie Like a Rug" and "Sex"
- Bill Dooley – producer and engineer on "Lie Like a Rug" and "Sex"
- Ed Garcia – engineer on "Lie Like a Rug" and "Sex"
- Ira McLaughlin – assistant engineer on "Lie Like a Rug" and "Sex"
- George Marino – mastering at Sterling Sound, New York
- Bob Defrin – art direction
- David Michael Kennedy – photography
