= Cool Kids (album) =

Studio album by Kix
- Released: March 7, 1983
- Studio: Criteria Studios, Miami Florida
- Genre: Hard rock; pop metal; new wave
- Length: 35:17
- Label: Atlantic
- Producer: Peter Solley

Kix chronology
Kix (1981)	Cool Kids (1983)	Midnite Dynamite (1985)

Singles from Cool Kids
- 1. "Loco-Emotion" Released: 1983; 2. "Body Talk" Released: 1983; 3. "Cool Kids" Released: 1983 (UK only)

Professional ratings
Review scores
Source	Rating
AllMusic	3/5 stars
Collector's Guide to Heavy Metal	7/10

Cool Kids is the second studio album by American hard rock band Kix. Released in 1983 on Atlantic Records, it is the only Kix album to feature Brad Divens of Wrathchild America and Souls at Zero on guitar.

== Background ==
Cool Kids reached No. 177 on the Billboard 200, the band's first appearance on the chart. It showcased the band incorporating new wave into their pop metal sound. It also started the trend of including material written by outside songwriters, which continued on their following studio albums.

"Body Talk" was the first single to be released off of the album and one of the album's three cover songs. First released as "(She Talks) Body Talk" on the 1981 Body Talk Muzik album by Nick Gilder (earlier of "Hot Child in the City" fame), and co-written by Gilder and his longtime musical associate, Jamie Herndon, this song was believed to have been included on Cool Kids to appease the group's label. The band was also urged to shoot a video for the song, which featured the Kix members cavorting with ladies in full-on workout garb.

The album also included the Spider cover "Burning Love," co-written by Spider's keyboardist Holly Knight – who later became a member of Device and a hit songwriter (incidentally, sometimes co-writing with Gilder) for artists such as Heart and Cheap Trick – and singer Amanda Blue (later of the group Shanghai), along with the title track "Cool Kids," a cover of a Franne Golde song from her 1980 album Restless, co-written by Golde with producer Peter McIan and Billy Steele.

== Track listing ==
All tracks composed by Donnie Purnell, except where noted

Side one

1. "Burning Love" (Amanda Blue, Holly Knight) – 3:07
2. "Cool Kids" (Franne Golde, Peter McIan, Billy Steele) – 3:28
3. "Love Pollution" (Steve Whiteman, Brian Forsythe) – 4:04
4. "Body Talk" (Nick Gilder, Jamie Herndon) – 3:39
5. "Loco-Emotion" – 3:30

Side two

1. "Mighty Mouth" – 3:43
2. "Nice on Ice" – 3:25
3. "Get Your Monkeys Out" – 3:20
4. "For Shame" – 3:11
5. "Restless Blood" (Purnell, Whiteman, Forsythe, Jimmy Chalfant, Brad Divens) – 3:50

== Personnel ==
Kix

- Steve Whiteman – lead vocals, harmonica, saxophone
- Brad Divens – guitars, backing vocals, talk box
- Brian "Damage" Forsythe – guitars
- Donnie Purnell – bass, backing vocals, keyboards, co-lead vocals on "Body Talk"
- Jimmy "Chocolate" Chalfant – drums, backing vocals, percussion, co-lead vocals on "Body Talk"

Production

- Peter Solley – producer
- Steve Klein – engineer, mixing
- Jim Sessody – assistant engineer
- Mike Fuller – mastering
- Lynn Dreese Breslin – art direction
- David Michael Kennedy – photography

== Charts ==
Chart (1983)	Peak position
US Billboard 200	177
