= Devil in the Details (Saigon Kick album) =

Studio album by Saigon Kick
- Released: 1995
- Recorded: February–March 1995
- Studio: Morrisound Recording, Tampa, Florida
- Genre: Hard rock
- Length: 51:58
- Label: CMC International; Pony Canyon
- Producer: Jason Bieler, Ronny Lahti

Saigon Kick chronology
Water (1993)	Devil in the Details (1995)	Greatest Mrs.: The Best of Saigon Kick (1998)

Professional ratings
Review scores
Source	Rating
AllMusic	3.5/5 stars

Devil in the Details is the fourth album by Saigon Kick, and the first to feature guitarist Pete Dembrowski.

The artwork used for the cover of the album is titled 'Winners And Losers' by painter Charles Bragg.

== Critical reception ==
Larry Flick of Billboard called the promo single for the song "Eden" in his positive review an "eclectic offering" and wrote, "Determined vocals join wandering piano keystrokes and a flurry of blazing guitars to form a surprisingly melodic rock track."

== Track listing ==
All lyrics are written by Jason Bieler; all music is composed by Bieler, except where noted.

No.	Title	Music	Length
1.	"Intro"		1:15
2.	"Russian Girl"		4:14
3.	"Killing Ground"	Bieler, Pete Dembrowski, Chris McLernon, Phil Varone	3:46
4.	"Eden"		5:02
5.	"Going On"	McLernon, Bieler	4:46
6.	"Everybody"		2:54
7.	"Spanish Rain"		5:03
8.	"Flesh and Bone"		3:54
9.	"Sunshine"		3:52
10.	"Victoria"		4:23
11.	"Afraid"		4:11
12.	"So Painfully"	McLernon	3:10
13.	"Edgar"		3:14
14.	"All Around"		2:14

Austrian, German and Swiss edition bonus tracks
No.	Title	Length
14.	"Sky is Falling"	4:08
15.	"The One"	4:26
Total length:		60:32

== Personnel ==
=== Saigon Kick ===
- Chris McLernon – bass, chant (2)
- Pete Dembrowski – guitar, chant (2)
- Phil Varone – drums, percussion, chant (2)
- Jason Bieler – vocals, guitar, programming, production, chant (2)

=== Additional musicians ===
- Howard Helm – programming (15)

=== Technical personnel ===
- Ronny Lahti – production, engineering, mixing, additional background vocals
- Jim Morris – assistant engineering, additional background vocals (1), chant (2)
- Tom Morris – additional background vocals (1), mastering, chant (2)
- Silvio – chant (2)
- Aaron Bieler – chant (2)
- Adrian von Ripka – remastering
- Tim Gavin – artwork, design
- Mark Weiss – photography back of booklet
