= Blow My Fuse =

Studio album by Kix
- Released: September 6, 1988
- Recorded: 1988
- Studio: Conway Studios and Cherokee Studios, Hollywood, California
- Genre: Hard rock; glam metal
- Length: 40:23
- Label: Atlantic
- Producer: Tom Werman, Duane Baron, John Purdell

Kix chronology
Midnite Dynamite (1985)	Blow My Fuse (1988)	Hot Wire (1991)

Singles from Blow My Fuse
- 1. "Cold Blood" Released: 1988; 2. "Blow My Fuse" Released: 1988; 3. "She Dropped Me the Bomb" Released: 1988; 4. "Get It While It's Hot" Released: 1989; 5. "Don't Close Your Eyes" Released: 1989

Professional ratings
Review scores
Source	Rating
AllMusic	4.5/5 stars
Collector's Guide to Heavy Metal	7/10

Blow My Fuse is the fourth studio album by American hard rock band Kix. Released on September 6, 1988, on Atlantic Records, the album features Kix's only hit, the power ballad "Don't Close Your Eyes". The song peaked at No. 11 on the Billboard Hot 100 and was co-written with Bob Halligan Jr. and Crack the Sky frontman John Palumbo, both of whom had previously collaborated on Kix songs. The album was certified platinum by the RIAA in 2000.

== Track listing ==
Side one

1. "Red Lite, Green Lite, TNT" (Donnie Purnell, Steve Whiteman, Jon Reede, Marc Tanner) – 3:54
2. "Get It While It's Hot" (Purnell, Philip Brown, John Palumbo) – 4:24
3. "No Ring Around Rosie" (Purnell, Taylor Rhodes) – 4:34
4. "Don't Close Your Eyes" (Purnell, Bob Halligan Jr., Palumbo) – 4:15
5. "She Dropped Me the Bomb" (Purnell, Palumbo) – 3:46

Side two

1. "Cold Blood" (Purnell, Rhodes) – 4:16
2. "Piece of the Pie" (Purnell, Whiteman, Reede, Tanner) – 3:55
3. "Boomerang" (Purnell) – 3:44
4. "Blow My Fuse" (Purnell) – 4:00
5. "Dirty Boys" (Purnell, Palumbo) – 3:42

== Personnel ==
Kix

- Steve Whiteman – lead vocals, harmonica
- Ronnie "10/10" Younkins – guitars
- Brian "Damage" Forsythe – guitars
- Donnie Purnell – bass, keyboards, piano, backing vocals
- Jimmy "Chocolate" Chalfant – drums, percussion, backing vocals

Production

- Tom Werman – producer on tracks 1, 2, 4, 6, 9, executive producer, mixing
- Duane Baron – producer on tracks 3, 5, 6–8, 10, engineer, mixing
- John Purdell – producer on tracks 3, 5, 6–8, 10, mixing
- Greg Fulginiti – mastering at Artisan Sound Recorders, Hollywood
- Bob Defrin – art direction
- John Scarpati – photography

== Charts ==
Chart (1989)	Peak position
US Billboard 200	46

== Certifications ==
Region	Certification	Certified units/sales
United States (RIAA)	Platinum	1,000,000^{^}
^{^} Shipments figures based on certification alone.
