= Kix (album) =

Studio album by Kix
- Released: September 1981
- Recorded: 1981
- Studio: Atlantic Studios, New York City
- Genre: Hard rock; pop metal
- Length: 36:12
- Label: Atlantic
- Producer: Tom Allom

Kix chronology
Kix (1981)	Cool Kids (1983)

Singles from Blow My Fuse
- 1. "The Itch" Released: 1981; 2. "Heartache" Released: 1981; 3. "Atomic Bombs" Released: 1981

Professional ratings
Review scores
Source	Rating
AllMusic	4/5 stars
Collector's Guide to Heavy Metal	5/10

Kix is the debut album by American rock band Kix. It was released in 1981 on Atlantic Records.

== Track listing ==
All tracks written by Donnie Purnell, except where indicated

Side one

1. "Atomic Bombs" – 3:45
2. "Love at First Sight" (Brian Forsythe, Steve Whiteman) – 2:42)
3. "Heartache" – 3:16
4. "Poison" – 3:46
5. "The Itch" – 4:26

Side two

1. "Kix Are for Kids" – 4:16
2. "Contrary Mary" (Forsythe, Purnell, Jimmy Chalfant, Ronnie Younkins, Whiteman) – 3:10
3. "The Kid" – 3:54
4. "Yeah, Yeah, Yeah" (Forsythe, Purnell, Chalfant, Younkins, Whiteman) – 6:57

== Personnel ==
Kix

- Steve Whiteman – lead vocals, harmonica, saxophone
- Ronnie Younkins – guitars
- Brian Forsythe – guitars
- Donnie Purnell – bass, backing vocals, keyboards
- Jimmy Chalfant – drums, backing vocals, percussion

Production

- Tom Allom – producer
- Bill Dooley – engineer
- Ed Garcia, Joe Procopio, Mark Ross, Michael O'Reilly – assistant engineers
- Bob Ludwig – mastering at Masterdisk, New York
- Bob Defrin – art direction
