= Saigon Kick (album) =

Studio album by Saigon Kick
- Released: February 12, 1991
- Studio: Scream, Studio City, California
- Genre: Hard rock; heavy metal; alternative rock
- Length: 50:11
- Label: Third Stone/Atlantic Records
- Producer: Michael Wagener

Saigon Kick chronology
| Saigon Kick (1991) | The Lizard (1992) |

Saigon Kick is the debut album by American rock band Saigon Kick. It features backing vocals by Jeff Scott Soto.

== Background ==
Saigon Kick's debut album was the first album to be released on the label Third Stone/Atlantic Records. This joint venture was founded in 1991 by Third Stone Records and Atlantic Records in order to distribute releases of Third Stone artists.

== Critical reception ==
Professional ratings
Review scores
| Source | Rating |
|---|---|
| AllMusic | 4/5 stars |
| Cash Box | Favorable |
| Fear | 4/5 stars |

Cash Box in its favorable review noted the stylistic diversity of the album: "Saigon Kick fuses hard rock/heavy metal, '60s-inspired psychedelia and/or punk on the band's aggressive yet melodic debut album." AllMusic's Eduardo Rivadavia saw this diversity as the album's weakness but thought that the songwriting made up for it: "The band tries desperately to please everyone and though they obviously fail, their 1991 eponymous debut still features very inspired songwriting and some amazing chops from guitarist Jason Bieler."

== Track listing ==
All lyrics are written by Jason Bieler, except where noted; all music is composed by Bieler.

| No. | Title | Lyrics | Length |
|---|---|---|---|
| 1. | "New World" | Bieler, Matt Kramer | 5:43 |
| 2. | "What You Say" | Bieler, Kramer | 3:49 |
| 3. | "What Do You Do" | Kramer | 2:40 |
| 4. | "Suzy" | | 3:40 |
| 5. | "Colors" | | 3:41 |
| 6. | "Coming Home" | Kramer | 4:17 |
| 7. | "Love of God" | Bieler, Kramer | 3:58 |
| 8. | "Down by the Ocean" | Bieler, Kramer | 2:35 |
| 9. | "Acid Rain" | | 1:38 |
| 10. | "My Life" | | 4:44 |
| 11. | "Month of Sundays" | Kramer | 2:26 |
| 12. | "Ugly" | | 2:35 |
| 13. | "Come Take Me Now" | Bieler, Kramer | 4:35 |
| 14. | "I.C.U." | Bieler, Kramer | 3:50 |

2018 reissue bonus tracks
| No. | Title | Length |
|---|---|---|
| 15. | "Hey Hey Hey" | 3:27 |
| 16. | "Colors (Acoustic)" | 3:35 |
| Total length: | | 57:13 |

== Personnel ==
=== Saigon Kick ===
- Matt Kramer – vocals
- Jason Bieler – guitar
- Tom Defile – bass
- Phil Varone – drums

=== Additional musicians ===
- Jeff Scott Soto – backing vocals (10, 13)

=== Technical personnel ===
- Michael Wagener – production, mixing
- Craig Doubet – engineering
- George Marino – mastering
- Derek Oliver – 2018 reissue liner notes
