= Kix (band) =

American hard rock band

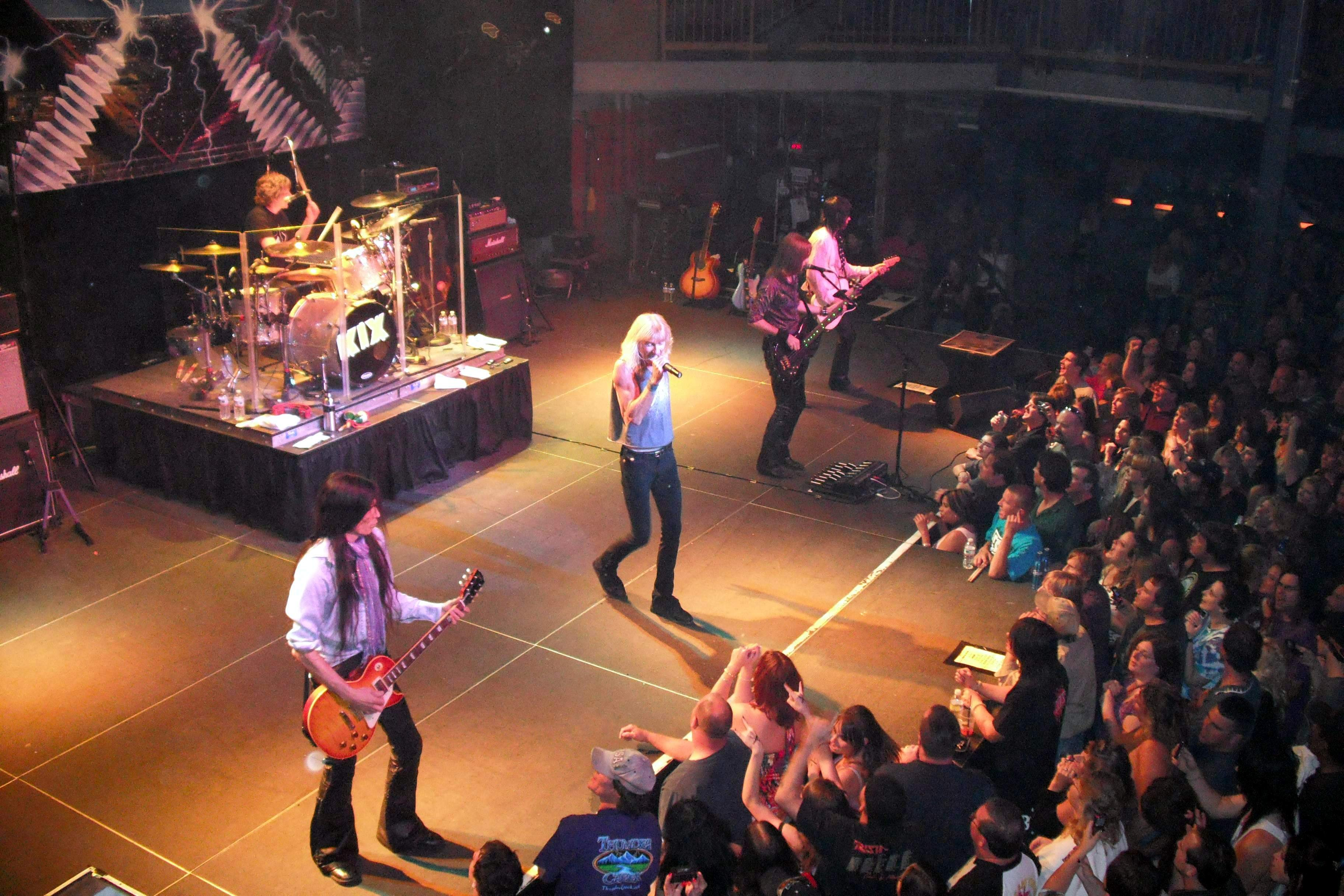
- Kix performing in 2009

Background information
- Also known as: Kicks (1976); Tee and Tunes (1976–1977); The Shooze (1977–1980); The Generators (1980); The Baltimore Cocks; KIX (1980–1996, 2004–2023); 4/5 KIX (2003–2004)
- Origin: Hagerstown, Maryland, US
- Genres: Hard rock; glam metal
- Years active: 1976–1996; 2003–2023
- Labels: Atlantic, East West, CMC International, Loud and Proud Records
- Spinoffs: Rhino Bucket
- Past members: Donnie Purnell; Tee; Tunes; Donnie Spence; Ronnie "10/10" Younkins; Brian "Damage" Forsythe; Buffalo Ed; Terry Brady; Sam Smith; Steve Whiteman; David "Stargazer" Bumbalough; Jimmy "Chocolate" Chalfant; Brad Divens; Mark Schenker
- Website: kixband.com

Kix (stylized as KIX) was an American hard rock band formed in 1976, that achieved popularity during the 1980s. The band's classic lineup consisted of Donnie Purnell (bass, keyboards, backing vocals, primary songwriter, co-leader), Ronnie "10/10" Younkins (guitar), Brian "Damage" Forsythe (guitar), Steve Whiteman (lead vocals, co-leader), and Jimmy "Chocolate" Chalfant (drums, backing vocals). Kix covered Aerosmith, April Wine, Led Zeppelin, and others before signing with Atlantic Records in 1981. After peaking in the late 1980s, band members continued to record and tour until their disbandment in 2023.

Some journalists consider Kix to be among the greatest glam metal acts of all time.

== History ==
=== Early years (1976–1987) ===
Brian "Damage" Forsythe's originally played drums then later guitar. His first band was Vanilla Grass as drummer; this band morphed into different things, and around late 1975 he left school to tour the south with two musician friends. The band Atlas Ram (featuring Jimmy "Chocolate" Chalfant) stole Brian Forsythe's rhythm guitarist, breaking up his band.

The very first lineup of what became KIX permanently formed in Hagerstown, Maryland and featured Donnie Purnell (from the band Jaxx), Tee, Tunes, and Donnie Spence, and very briefly used the name KIX, but soon went by the name Tee and Tunes. In December 1976, Ronnie "10/10" Younkins joined Donnie Purnell and the rest. Tee and Tunes soon left as they were commuting from Pittsburgh. Younkins soon had a chance encounter with Brian "Damage" Forsythe (who had auditioned for a cover band that Younkins had recently left), who he already knew.

Drummer Jimmy "Chocolate" Chalfant (who had previously played with Donnie Purnell in "Fire and Rain", "Starship", and "Jaxx") joined in 1979, completing what would become the band's classic lineup. Later, they had a stint using the name The Generators, before eventually reverting back to KIX. The band got a contract with Time Warner affiliate Atlantic Records.

Also in 1981, they released their self-titled debut album, Kix, which featured favorites from their live shows like "Atomic Bombs," "The Itch," and "Yeah, Yeah, Yeah." With a unique ad-lib performance by lead vocalist Whiteman, the latter became one of the band's most popular concert songs. Another track, "Love at First Sight," also became a concert favorite. The album established the tongue-in-cheek rock and roll style of Kix.

Their 1983 follow-up, Cool Kids, showcased a more commercial side of the band and included three cover songs. Spearheaded by the single "Body Talk", a cover of a 1981 Nick Gilder song, rumors circulated that the song was covered to appease the band's label, who was eager to capture radio airplay. Other songs like "Restless Blood" and "Mighty Mouth" fared a little better. This album was also the only Kix record to feature guitarist Brad Divens, who replaced Younkins for what would ultimately be a brief departure.

Eager to recapture the harder rock vibe of their earlier work, and with Younkins having returned to the lineup, Kix partnered with then Ratt and future Warrant producer Beau Hill and hit songwriter Bob Halligan Jr., releasing Midnite Dynamite in 1985. The album spawned two singles: "Midnite Dynamite" reached No. 18, followed by "Cold Shower," which reached No. 23, both on the Hot Mainstream Rock chart. Other notable tracks receiving airplay included "Sex" and "Bang Bang (Balls of Fire)".

=== Commercial success (1988–1995) ===
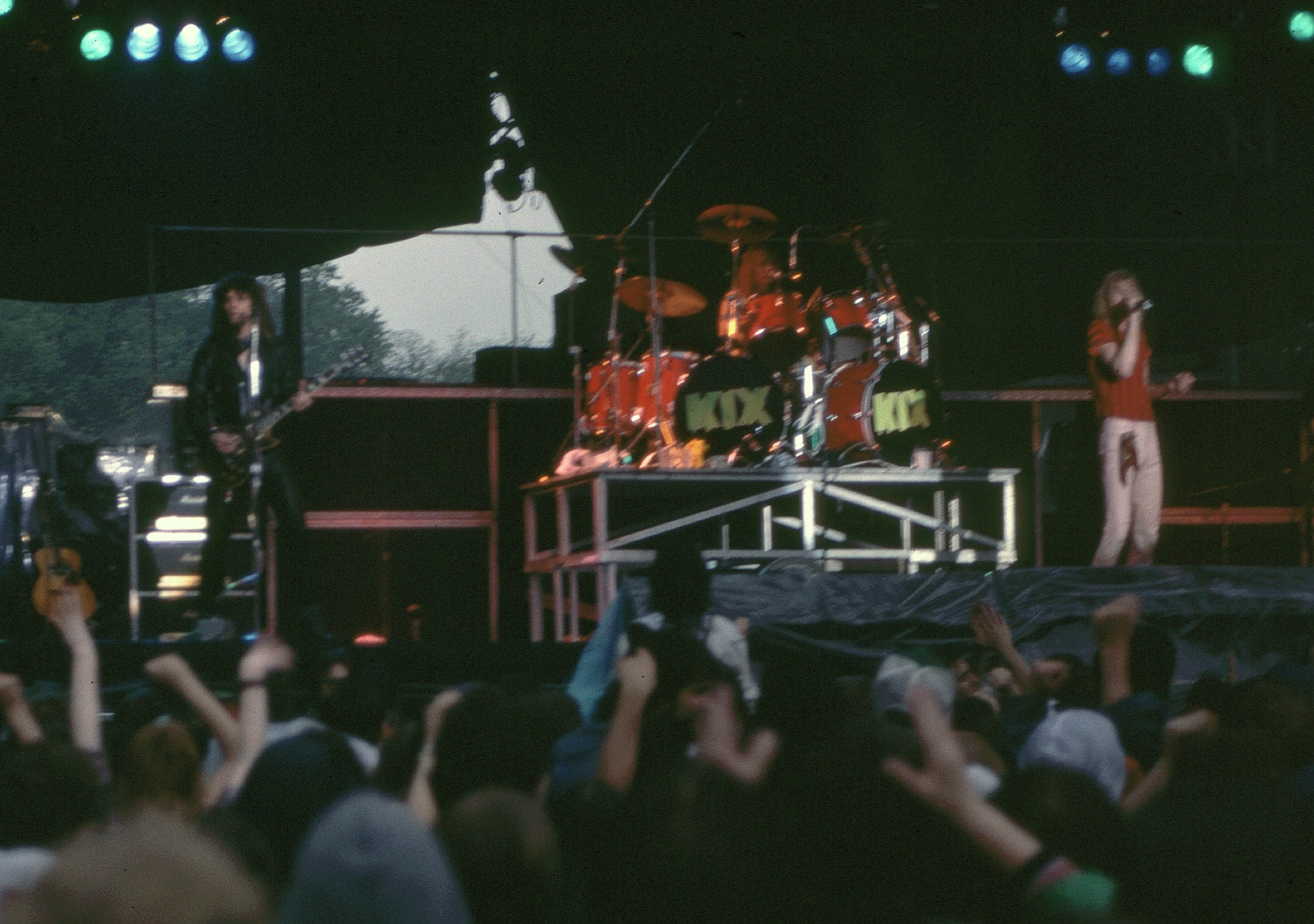
Kix performing in 1983

After Midnite Dynamite, Kix went back into the studio to record their follow-up. In 1988, they released Blow My Fuse, which went platinum. The Bob Halligan Jr. co-written power ballad "Don't Close Your Eyes" peaked at No. 11 on the Billboard Hot 100. The album also featured the singles "Cold Blood" (the first of Purnell's many co-writes with Taylor Rhodes) and the title track, "Blow My Fuse", along with videos showing the band in concert at Hammerjack's. In 1989, the band released Blow My Fuse: The Videos, featuring their official video releases and behind-the-scenes footage. The success of Blow My Fuse enabled the band to begin performing in arenas.

The album Hot Wire arrived in 1991, with the single "Girl Money". In 1993, guitarist Jimi K. Bones replaced Brian "Damage" Forsythe. While on tour in 1992, they made a live album, titled Live, showcasing a recent performance at the University of Maryland, College Park. This album, internally referred to as Contractual Obligation Live, was released in 1993. In 1994, Atlantic dropped the band from the label. In 1995, the band released their next album, $how Bu$ine$$, on CMC International.

=== Side projects ===
In 1996, Whiteman formed a band called Funny Money. In 1998, Brian "Damage" Forsythe teamed up with ex-White Sister and Tattoo Rodeo drummer Rich Wright, and erstwhile Rhino Bucket members rhythm guitarist/lead vocalist Georg Dolivo (George Dolivo) and bassist Reeve Downes to forge Deep Six Holiday. In 2001, Forsythe himself would join Rhino Bucket, later performing lead guitar on the group's 2005 release And Then It Got Ugly..

Meanwhile, Ronnie "10/10" Younkins relocated to Baltimore City, and would be part of the rock 'n' roll act Jeremy and the Suicides. Younkins later moved to Los Angeles, then wrote, recorded, and released the album The Slimmer Twins: Lack of Luxury, as a collaboration with vocalist Jeremy L. White in 2000. Back on the East Coast, he founded the Blues Vultures in 2002, maturing into the lead vocalist and primary songwriter, and in 2005, released the album The Blues Vultures: Cheap Guitars & Honky Tonk Bars.

Jimmy "Chocolate" Chalfant joined Whiteman in Funny Money as their drummer in 2003, ultimately sowing the seeds for a Kix reunion.

=== Reunion and disbandment (2003–2023) ===
Kix reformed in late 2003 without songwriter and leader Donnie Purnell. Kix then lined-up shows for September 2004, the line-up consisting of Whiteman (lead vocals), Younkins (guitars), Brian "Damage" Forsythe (guitars), Jimmy "Chocolate" Chalfant (drums, backing vocals), and Funny Money bassist/vocalist/songwriter Mark Schenker in place of Donnie Purnell.

On August 7, 2012, Frontiers Records announced that it had signed Kix; the band subsequently released a live CD/DVD, titled Live in Baltimore, in September, with a new studio album to follow in 2013.

On April 16, 2014, it was announced that the band had signed with Loud & Proud Records to release the band's first studio album in 19 years. On June 18, 2014, it was announced that the band would release this album - their seventh studio album - titled Rock Your Face Off, on August 5. Upon release, it debuted at No. 49 on the Billboard Top 200 (the band's second highest-charting record after 1988's Blow My Fuse), while debuting at No. 1 on Amazon Hard Rock, remaining there for more than three weeks. Hard rock webzine Sleaze Roxx awarded Rock Your Face Off No. 1 in the Top Ten Albums of 2014 by editors and staff, and reported that the album reached No. 1 in the Top Ten Albums of 2014 Sleaze Roxx Reader's Poll. It was the first time in the site's history that an album had taken the top spot in both categories. Stereogum.com chose Rock Your Face Off as Album of the Week on August 5, 2014.

In February 2017, it was announced that Kix would headline the first night at Rockingham Festival 2017, which was held at Nottingham Trent University, United Kingdom.

Original Shooze drummer Donnie Spence died at the age of 64 on January 19, 2018 in Hagerstown, Maryland.

On September 21, 2018 a 2 CD anniversary edition set named Fuse 30 Reblown – 30th Anniversary Special Edition was released. Beau Hill, who produced Kix's 1985 album Midnite Dynamite, remixed the original 24 track recordings. Fuse 30 Reblown was conceived by bassist Schenker, who, with help from record executive Madelyn Scarpulla, was able to obtain digital transfers from the master analog recording reels. Schenker was also instrumental in finding and restoring the original demo reels. In 2020 the preceding album Midnight Dynamite was also remixed and re-released; called Midnight Dynamite Re-Lit, it is, to date, only available as a digital download.

Beginning in November 2020, guitarist Ronnie Younkins took a leave of absence from touring. In May 2021, Bob Paré began performing live with Kix in his place. Soon after, it was revealed that Younkins' absence was due to being placed under house arrest after repeated run-ins with the law. In late February 2022, Younkins returned to live performances with his own band; he remained on hiatus from live performances with Kix.

On November 18, 2022, drummer Jimmy Chalfant suffered an apparent severe cardiac event while on stage at the Tally Ho Theater in Leesburg, VA. Drum tech Sam Stilwell and others assisted with attending to Chalfant, but the band did not finish the performance. From March 2023 until May 2023, Matt Starr filled-in for Chalfant for live performances. Chalfant ceased performing backing vocals following the episode.

On May 7, 2023, during an appearance at the M3 Rock Festival at the Merriweather Post Pavilion in Columbia, Maryland, Steve Whiteman announced that Kix would perform their final show on September 17 at the same venue. The band disbanded following the performance, with Ronnie Younkins and former guitarist Brad Divens performing with the band.

== Musical style and influences ==
Kix performs glam metal music. Jeff Mezydlo of Yardbarker stated that Kix was "not full-on big hair and lipstick" compared to other glam metal bands of their era. Their music has drawn comparisons to Aerosmith. AllMusic said the band's music "sounded like a constant party" and that it was "was seen as wimpy by most metal fans" around the time it was released. The site called it "good-time metal".

Lyrical themes explored in the band's songs include but are not limited to suicide.

== Side projects ==
In 2018, bassist Mark Schenker and drummer Vince Tricarico formed the Rush tribute band Sun Dogs. Schenker handled lead vocals, bass, keyboards, and bass pedals.

== In popular culture ==
The 2017 horror comedy Dead Ant covers songs by Kix, presented as songs by Sonic Grave, a fictional has-been glam metal band.

== Band members ==
- Donnie Purnell – bass, keyboards, piano, backing vocals, acoustic guitar (1976–1996), lead vocals (1976–1977)
- Ronnie "10/10" Younkins – guitar, talk box, backing vocals (1976–1982, 1983–1996, 2003–2023; did not perform 2020–2023)
- 'Tee' – lead vocals (1976–1977)
- 'Tunes' – guitar, backing vocals (1976–1977)
- Donnie Spence – drums, percussion, backing vocals (1976–1980), lead vocals (1976–1978)
- 'Buffalo Ed' – lead vocals (1977)
- Terry Brady – lead vocals (1977–1978)
- Brian "Damage" Forsythe – guitar, guitar synthesizer, backing vocals (1977–1993, 1994–1995, 2003–2023); keyboards (2003–2023)
- Jimmy "Chocolate" Chalfant – drums, percussion, backing vocals, effects (1978–1996, 2003–2023)
- Sam Smith – lead vocals (1978)
- Steve Whiteman – lead vocals, harmonica, percussion, saxophone, acoustic guitar (1978–1996, 2003–2023)
- David "Stargazer" Bumbalough – guitar (1978–1980)
- Brad Divens – guitar, backing vocals, talk box (1982–1984; touring guest 2023)
- Mark Schenker – bass, backing vocals, acoustic guitar (2003–2023)

Touring substitutes

- Jimi K. Bones – guitar (1989, 1992, 1993–1994, 1995; touring guest 2016)
- Roger Studner – guitar (1995)
- Pat DeMent – guitar (1995–1996)
- Aaron Isaacs – drums, percussion, backing vocals (2008)
- Ned Meloni – guitar (2019)
- Bob Paré – guitar, backing vocals (2020, 2021–2023)
- John Allen – drums, percussion, backing vocals (2020, 2021)
- Will Hunt – drums, percussion (2021)
- Vince Tricarico – drums, percussion (2021)
- Matt Starr – drums, percussion, backing vocals (March–May 2023)

Timeline

== Discography and videography ==
=== Studio albums ===
Title	Release	Peak chart positions	Sales	Certifications
Title	Release	USA	Sales	Certifications
Kix	1981	—		
Cool Kids	1983	177		
Midnite Dynamite	1985	—		
Blow My Fuse	1988	46		US: Platinum
Hot Wire	1991	64	US: 200,000+	
$how Bu$ine$$	1995	—		
Rock Your Face Off	2014	49	US: 20,000+	

=== Live albums ===
- Live (1993)
- Live in Baltimore (2012)
- Can't Stop The Show: The Return of Kix (2016)

=== Compilation albums ===
- The Essentials (2002)
- Thunderground (2004) (unofficial bootleg of demos)
- Rhino Hi-Five EP (2006)

=== Guest appearances ===
- Monster Metal Power Ballads (2006 – track "Still Loving You" (Scorpions cover), credited as "Still Lovin' You" by Steve Whitman)
- Monster Ballads: Platinum Edition (2006, retail version – track "Don't Close Your Eyes")
- Monster Ballads: Platinum Edition (2005, exclusive version – track "Don't Close Your Eyes")
- Leppardmania: A Tribute to Def Leppard (2000 – track "Foolin'" (Def Leppard cover), credited as "Foolin'" by Steve Whiteman)
- Monster Ballads (1999 – track "Don't Close Your Eyes")

=== Singles ===
Title	Release	Peak chart positions		Album
Title	Release	USA	USA Rock	Album
"Heartache"	1981	—	—	Kix
"The Itch"	1981	—	—	Kix
"Atomic Bombs"	1981	—	—	Kix
"Body Talk"	1983	104	—	Cool Kids
"Loco-Emotion"	1983	—	—	Cool Kids
"Cool Kids"	1983	—	—	Cool Kids
"Midnite Dynamite"	1985	—	—	Midnite Dynamite
"Cold Shower"	1985	—	—	Midnite Dynamite
"Scarlet Fever"	1985	—	—	Midnite Dynamite
"Cold Blood"	1988	—	—	Blow My Fuse
"Blow My Fuse"	1988	—	—	Blow My Fuse
"She Dropped Me The Bomb"	1988	—	—	Blow My Fuse
"Get It While It's Hot"	1989	—	—	Blow My Fuse
"Don't Close Your Eyes"	1989	11	16	Blow My Fuse
"Girl Money"	1991	—	26	Hot Wire
"Hot Wire"	1991	—	—	Hot Wire
"Same Jane"	1991	—	—	Hot Wire
"Tear Down The Walls"	1991	—	42	Hot Wire
"9-1-1"	1995	—	—	$how Bu$ine$$
"Put Your Money Where Your Mouth Is"	1995	—	—	$how Bu$ine$$
"Love Me With Your Top Down"	2014	—	—	Rock Your Face Off
"Wheels In Motion"	2014	—	—	Rock Your Face Off
"—" denotes a recording that did not chart.

=== Videos ===
- Blow My Fuse: The Videos (1989)
