= The Lizard (album) =

Studio album by Saigon Kick
- Released: June 2, 1992
- Recorded: February–March 1992
- Studios: Soundtrade, Solna, Sweden
- Genre: Hard rock
- Length: 53:17
- Label: Third Stone/Atlantic
- Producer: Jason Bieler

Saigon Kick chronology
Saigon Kick (1991)	The Lizard (1992)	Water (1993)

Singles from The Lizard
- 1. "All I Want" Released: 1992; 2. "Love Is On the Way" Released: 1992

The Lizard is the second album of American rock band Saigon Kick, released on June 2, 1992 through Third Stone/Atlantic.

== Release ==
The track "Body Bags" was featured on the soundtrack to the 1993 crime TV film Beyond the Law.

== Critical reception ==
Professional ratings
Review scores
Source	Rating
AllMusic	2.5/5 stars
Billboard	Favorable
The Hard Report	Favorable
Hit Parader	Favorable

Billboard considered the stylistic diversity of The Lizard the album's strength, writing "Elements of the Beatles, Led Zeppelin, and virtually every band in between fuel Saigon Kick's second release, which packs a more well-rounded punch than 1991's debut", and called the song "God of 42nd Street" the album's "best cut". On November 20, 1996 the Recording Industry Association of America honored the band for selling 500,000 units of the album with the certification of a gold award.

== Track listing ==
All lyrics are written by Jason Bieler, except where noted; all music is composed by Bieler, except where noted.

No.	Title	Lyrics	Music	Length
1.	"Cruelty"			2:40
2.	"Hostile Youth"	Bieler, Matt Kramer		3:18
3.	"Feel the Same Way"			2:42
4.	"Freedom"	Bieler, Kramer		4:12
5.	"God of 42nd Street"			3:59
6.	"My Dog"	Kramer		0:51
7.	"Peppermint Tribe"	Bieler, Kramer		4:52
8.	"Love Is On the Way"			4:23
9.	"The Lizard"	Bieler, Kramer		4:02
10.	"All Alright"			3:54
11.	"Sleep"			1:00
12.	"All I Want"			3:44
13.	"Body Bags"	Kramer, Phil Varone		3:21
14.	"Miss Jones"			2:39
15.	"World Goes Round"		Bieler, Tom DeFile	4:54
16.	"Chanel"			2:46

Japanese release and 2018 reissue bonus track
No.	Title	Lyrics	Music	Length
17.	"Dear Prudence"	Lennon–McCartney	Lennon–McCartney	3:40
Total length:				56:57

== Personnel ==
=== Saigon Kick ===
- Matt Kramer – vocals, cover concept
- Jason Bieler – guitar, vocals, keyboard, production
- Tom DeFile – bass
- Phil Varone – drums, percussion

=== Technical personnel ===
- Ronny Lahti – engineering, mixing
- George Marino – mastering
- Sheila Rock – photography
- Tim Gavin – logo design
- Ronald Bonkert – cover art
- Jonathan Shaw – cover art
- Bob Defrin – art direction
- Larry Freemantle – art direction
- Adam Blumenthal – handwriting
- Derek Oliver – 2018 reissue liner notes

== Charts ==
Chart (1992)	Peak position
US Billboard 200 (Billboard)	80
US Heatseekers Albums (Billboard)	1

== Certifications ==
Region	Certification	Certified units/sales
United States (RIAA)	Gold	500,000^{^}
^{^} Shipments figures based on certification alone.
