= Tora Tora =

American rock band

- Origin: Memphis, Tennessee, U.S.
- Genres: Hard rock; glam metal
- Years active: 1986–1994, 2008–present
- Labels: A&M, FNA, Frontiers
- Members: Anthony Corder; Keith Douglas; Patrick Francis; John Patterson

Tora Tora is an American hard rock band formed in Memphis, Tennessee in 1985.

== Name ==
"Tora" means "tiger" in Japanese and the name is a play on the code name for attack used by the Japanese Imperial Navy during their attack on Pearl Harbor, "Tora, Tora, Tora". The actual origin of the band name was more likely a reference to the song of the same name recorded by Van Halen on their 1980 release Women and Children First. In a 1989 Headbangers Ball interview with singer Anthony Corder and bassist Patrick Francis, they said that a friend of the band came up with a list of 60 to 70 different names for their band, and they picked the name Tora Tora because it stood out to them the most. They mentioned in the same interview that the original name of the band had been "Free Beer".

== History ==
Tora Tora started out as a local garage band then eventually got studio time when they won a local Battle of the Bands contest. Following this, the band recorded To Rock to Roll as an independent EP. After its release the songs "Phantom Rider" and "Love's A Bitch" received extensive airplay on local radio station Rock 98. After signing with A&M Records, they recorded their debut album Surprise Attack in 1989. This album peaked on Billboard's Top 200 at No. 47 and featured the singles "Walkin' Shoes" and "Guilty." The single "Dancing With a Gypsy" was on the soundtrack for the film Bill and Ted's Excellent Adventure later that year. Tora Tora was the first band from Memphis, Tennessee, to have a music video, "Walkin' Shoes" on MTV.

In 1992, their second album, Wild America, was released. It only achieved No. 134 on the Billboard charts and it did not sell as well, but, it was a more mature step at songwriting.

A third album, Revolution Day, was recorded in 1994, but it was never released due to label restructuring. After missing the due date, the band folded.

In 2008, all four original band members reunited to do several performances. One was a sold-out performance at Newby's, a local club in Memphis, to celebrate their 20th anniversary of receiving their recording contract. After the show, a record was sold to fans which included songs from their first two albums and material slated for their unreleased Revolution Day album. The album was titled The Warehouse... 20 Years Later. The second occurred during Rocklahoma 2008. The band played another reunion show at The New Daisy Theatre on March 7, 2009, in Memphis.

At the end of 2009, Tora Tora signed with the Nashville, Tennessee based FNA Records and released three albums. Before & After, Bombs Away: The Unreleased Surprise Attack Recordings, and Miss B. Haven': The Unreleased Wild America Recordings.

On February 28, 2011, FNA Records in conjunction with the band decided after 17 years since the completion of their third album, which was shelved indefinitely at the time due to label complications, to release their "lost album" Revolution Day. Anthony Corder stated about the Revolution Day Sessions:

The Revolution Day project was an interesting time for TORA TORA. It was the '93-'94 era, we were overlapping the last embers of our Wild America dates, rehearsing ideas for the new project, growing from our touring experiences, and experimenting with recording techniques. We relocated our rehearsal space to a warehouse over by the Memphis airport, and tried to stay focused on pre-production. We were pulling together ideas from handheld cassette recorders, scribbled napkins, & 8 track recordings we made on the bus or hotel rooms. I think we were more comfortable with our creative spirits, more confident in our ideas and our approach to songwriting. All of us contributed on the former projects, but everyone was struggling for the third project to keep the TORA identity, and go somewhere new at the same time. We definitely [sic] had moments of anxiety and frustration [sic] but it was all well worth it once we locked down the tunes. We were joined by The Memphis Horns as well as Susan Marshall and Stacy Plunk adding back-up vocals on two tracks. The Revolution sessions were some of our most memorable escapades, and had us back at home in Ardent, hanging with Molly's LaCasita crew, and me personally closing down most Midtown establishments.

Since 2008, the band has been somewhat active playing shows almost every year. In 2019, they released the album Bastards of Beale drawing strong reviews.

Tora Tora continues to tour and in 2024 released a compilation album called "Best of the Rest.". The album contains four singles released between 2021-2024. The album also contains studio Outtakes and Demos from previous Tora Tora albums including Revolution Day. The album is on streaming but a run of limited edition CDs has also been released.

== Band members ==
- Anthony Corder – vocals, acoustic guitar
- Keith Douglas – guitar, backing vocals
- Patrick Francis – bass guitar, backing vocals
- John Patterson – drums

== Discography ==
=== Studio albums ===
- Surprise Attack (1989) No. 47 US Billboard 200
- Wild America (1992) No. 132 US Billboard 200
- Revolution Day (1994)
- Bastards of Beale (2019)

=== Compilation albums ===
- Revolution Day (1994/2011) (recorded in 1994, Previously unreleased – released on February 28, 2011, by FNA Records)
- Before & After (2009) FNA Records
- Bombs Away: The Unreleased Surprise Attack Recordings (2009) FNA Records
- Miss B. Haven': The Unreleased Wild America Recordings (2010) FNA Records
- Best of the Rest (2024) Club Tora Records

=== Extended plays ===
- To Rock to Roll (1987)
- Unplugged (2020)

=== Singles ===
- "Walkin' Shoes" (1989) No. 86 US Billboard Hot 100 No. 25 Rock Tracks
- "Guilty"
- "Phantom Rider"
- "Amnesia"
- "Dead Man's Hand"
- "Faith Healer"

=== Soundtrack appearances ===
Title	Release	Soundtrack
"Dancing with a Gypsy"	1989	Bill & Ted's Excellent Adventure

=== Home video ===
- Live: A Benefit for Patrick Francis (2016)
