= Ceili Rain =

American Christian band

Ceili Rain is a Christian band based in Syracuse, New York that is influenced by Celtic music. It is led by Bob Halligan, Jr. and was founded in May 1995.

As the group's founder, Bob Halligan, Jr. explains, in Gaelic, the word "Céili" (pronounced kay-lee) means "party", specifically one with live musicians, dancing, and general merriment for an all-ages crowd. "Coeli" is a form of the Latin word for "heaven". Rain is English, meaning downpour. Thus, according to Halligan, Ceili Rain is a "downpour of heavenly partiness."

== Personnel ==
=== Current members ===
- Bob Halligan, Jr. (May 1995–present) — lead vocals, guitar
- Joe Davoli (2007–present) — violin, vocals
- Raymond Arias (1997–present) — guitar, vocals
- Bill Bleistine (2003–present) — drums, percussion, vocals
- Kevin de Souza (2008–present) — bass, vocals
- Buddy Connolly (May 1996–present) — accordion, keyboards, vocals
- Burt Mitchell (2000–present) — pipes, whistles

=== Former and occasional members ===
- Matt Mason (full-time 2005–2012) — bass, vocals
- Skip Cleavinger (Dec 1997-occasional) — pipes, whistles
- John Dreibelbis (2005-occasional) — pipes, whistles
- Tyler Duncan (2005-occasional)- pipes, whistles
- Dan Meyer (entertainer) (2005-occasional) - whistles, swords
- Phil Madeira (Jan 1996-May 1996) — accordion, keyboards, vocals
- Tim Lauer (May 1995 - Jan 1996) — accordion, keyboards, vocals
- John McGillian (occasional) — accordion, keyboards, vocals
- Susie Monick (occasional) — accordion, keyboards, vocals
- Gretchen Priest (?) — violin, vocals
- Patrick Ross (2003 ?) - violin
- Chris Carmichael (May 1995 - May 1996) — violin, cello
- Rick Cua (1995-1997) — bass
- Bob Harmon (1998-200?) — bass, vocals
- Andrew Lamb (1998-2000) — bass, vocals
- Lance Hoppen (1997-?) — bass, vocals
- Daniel Grimsland (Sep 2002–2005) — Bass, Vocals
- Paul Grimsland (?) — Guitar, Vocals
- Naoise Sheridan (?) — Guitar, Vocals
- Bruce Wallace (?) — Guitar, Vocals
- Tony Hooper (May 1995 – 1997) — guitar, vocals
- Rocky Marvel (?) — drums, percussion
- Mark Hagan (?) — drums, percussion
- Nick Buda (?) — drums, percussion
- Lang Bliss (?) — drums, percussion
- Nick Distefano (1995) — drums, percussion
- John Daneluk (2003) — drums, percussion
- Chris Eddy (2000) — drums, percussion
- Robbie Spangnolitti (2004) — drums, percussion
- Jim Hoke (May 1995) — pipes, whistles
- Diane Davitch (1995) — pipes, whistles
- John Brown (1995) — pipes, whistles
- Diane Davitch (1995) — pipes, whistles
- Hunter Lee (?-1997) — pipes, whistles
- Matt Fisher (1997) — pipes, whistles
- Sarah Hart (?) — pipes, whistles

== Discography ==
=== Albums ===
- "Say Kay-lee" (Punch Records) — (1997)
- We're Makin' A Party LIVE! — (1999) Recorded July 30, 1999 at Schouler Park, North Conway, NH directly to D.A.T. from house mixing console.
- Erasers On Pencils— (2000)
- No You, No Me (Cross Driven Records) — (2002)
- Change In Your Pocket — (2004)
- Anthology: 1995-2005 (Tag Artist Group) — (2005)
- Whatever Makes You Dance — (2006)
- I Made Lemonade - (2009)
- Manuka Honey - (2011)
- Hymns & Hers - (2014)
- Crash This Gate - (2023)

=== Video ===
- Anthology: 1995-2005 (DVD) (Balance Studios) — (2005)
- Like A Train: 2005 (Music Video) (Music Video of the Year UCMVA Awards)— (Balance Studios)(2005)
- Hallways of Always: 2006 (Music Video) (Music Video of the Year UCMVA Awards)— (Balance Studios)(2005-2006)
- STOMP: 2005 (Music Video) — (Balance Studios)(2005)
