= Funny Money (band) =

American rock band

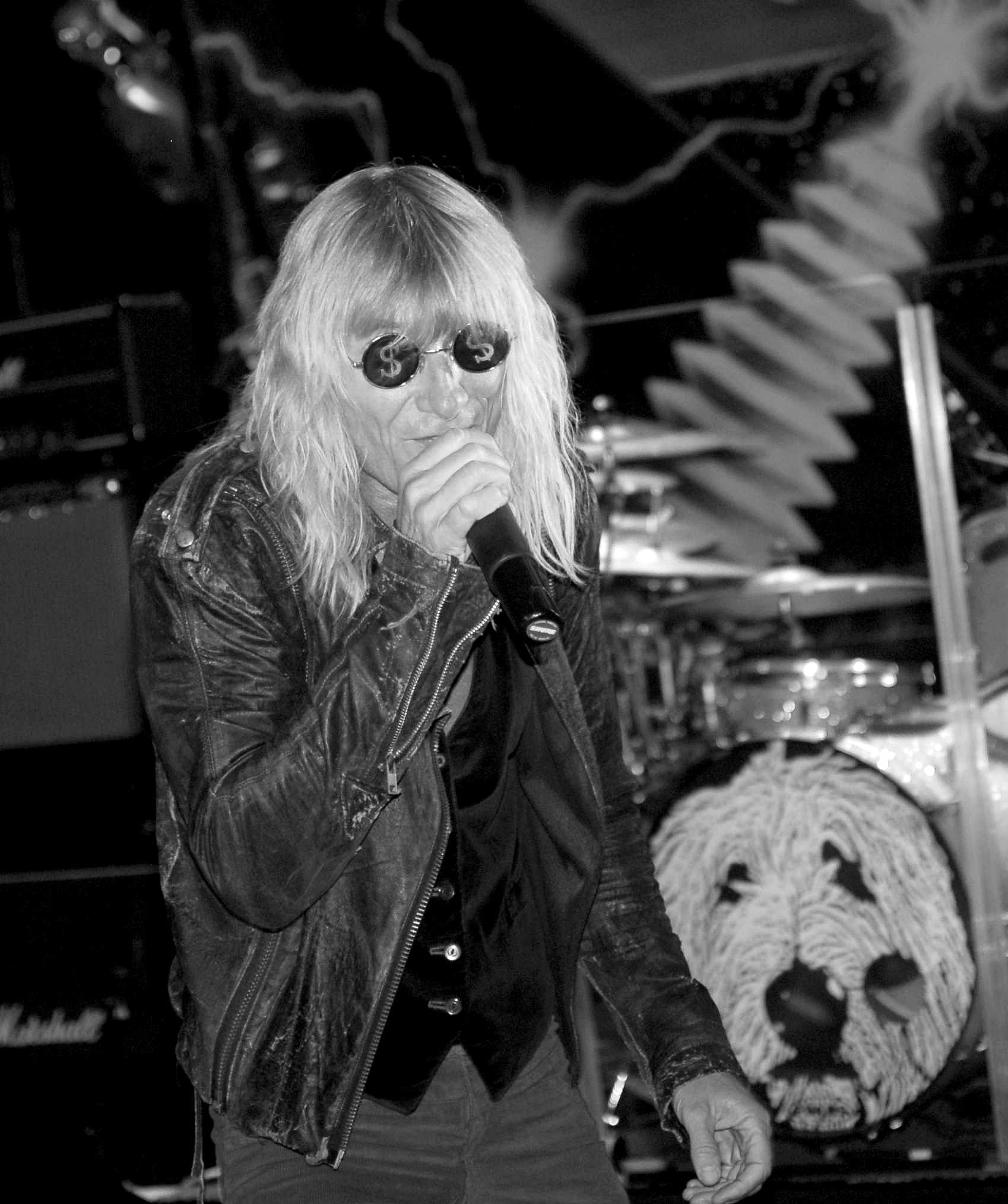
- Steve Whiteman performing with Funny Money

Background information
- Origin: Maryland, U.S.
- Genres: Hard rock, glam metal
- Years active: 1996–present
- Labels: Atlantic Records
- Members: Steve Whiteman; Dean Cramer; Mark Schenker; Jimmy Chalfant
- Past members: Billy Andrews; Ned Meloni; Bobby George; Geoff Burrell; Louis Coppola; Sam Stilwell; Rob Galpin
- Website: funnymoneyband.com

Funny Money is an American rock band. They played at multiple venues in the Maryland, Virginia, West Virginia, and Pennsylvania area. They played a mix of Kix covers as well as original material.

== History ==
=== Early years ===
Funny Money was founded in 1996 in Maryland by lead vocalist Steve Whiteman of Piedmont, WV and guitarist Billy Andrews, who met at a charity gig in Baltimore. Their initial sessions consisted of Kix material and material written by Whiteman with Shea Quinn of the Sharks. Whiteman and Andrews recruited guitarist Dean Cramer, one of Whiteman's vocal students, bassist Ned Meloni, who had played with New York's Ice Water Mansion, and Washington, D.C.'s Monarch in the 1980s and had extensive studio experience, and drummer Bobby George. George left the band shortly afterward, and Geoff Burrell of Tubefreeks and Swingin' Dix was recruited in his place.

=== Background ===
After attempting to make a name for themselves with new material, the band began incorporating Kix material into their shows, in response to fan demands. In 1998, Funny Money released their self-titled debut album, Funny Money, produced and engineered by Andrews. It was followed in 1999 with Back Again, recorded, produced, and engineered at Andrews' home, and a live album, Even Better Live, recorded at Jaxx Nightclub in Springfield, Virginia in 2001. However, in 2003, Andrews, Meloni, and Burrell all announced that they were leaving to pursue other interests. Whiteman and Cramer recruited guitarist Louis Coppola, former Centerfold bassist Mark Schenker on Meloni's recommendations, and drummer Sam Stillwell.

=== Recent events ===
In 2003, while Funny Money were working on their fourth release, Skin to Skin, Coppola and Stillwell were replaced by former Centerfold guitarist Rob Galpin and Kix drummer Jimmy Chalfant respectively. Skin to Skin went on to become the band's best-selling album. In 2006, Cramer left the band to work with Sebastian Bach of Skid Row fame, followed by working on/recording material with Marc Ferreira and their new band Goodbye Thrill. Their fifth record, Stick It!, was released in December 2006, mixed by Kix's ex-producer Beau Hill. Dean Cramer returned in November 2008. The song "Play Me Like a Rhythm" from the 2006 album "Stick It" is featured in the 2013 movie "The Frozen Ground".

== Band members ==
=== Current members ===
- Steve Whiteman – lead vocals (1996–present)
- Dean Cramer – guitar, backing vocals (1996–2006, 2008–present)
- Mark Schenker – bass, backing vocals (2003–present)
- Jimmy Chalfant – drums, percussion, backing vocals (2003–present)

=== Former members ===
- Billy Andrews – guitars, backing vocals, keyboards (1996–2003)
- Ned Meloni – bass, backing vocals (1996–2003)
- Bobby George – drums, percussion (1996)
- Geoff Burrell – drums, percussion (1996–2003)
- Sam Stilwell – drums, percussion (2003)
- Louis Coppola – guitars, backing vocals (2003)
- Rob Galpin – guitars (2003–2008)

== Discography ==
- Funny Money (1998)
1. "Off My Rocker"
2. "Art of Persuasion"
3. "Can't Take the Heat"
4. "Baby Blues"
5. "For Keeps"
6. "Boogie Man"
7. "Pick Me Up"
8. "Suckin' My Blood"
9. "Monkey See, Monkey Do"
10. "Dry Eyes Cry"
- Back Again (1999)
1. "Resurrection (Back Again)"
2. "Funny Money"
3. "Pink Glasses"
4. "Sloppy Kisses"
5. "Wrapped Around You"
6. "Horny Little Angel"
7. "Damage Control"
8. "I Felt Everything (...But Sorry)"
9. "Owe It All to You"
10. "Boogie Man (Live!)"
- Even Better...Live! (2001)
1. "Funny Money"
2. "Resurrection (Back Again)"
3. "I'm Your Whore"
4. "Art of Persuasion"
5. "Sloppy Kisses"
6. "Baby Blues"
7. "Horny Little Angel"
8. "You Rub Me the Right Way"
9. "Pink Glasses"
10. "Off My Rocker"
- Back Again (special re-issue) (2001)
1. "Resurrection (Back Again)"
2. "Funny Money"
3. "Pink Glasses"
4. "Sloppy Kisses"
5. "Wrapped Around You"
6. "Horny Little Angel"
7. "Damage Control"
8. "I Felt Everything (...But Sorry)"
9. "Owe It All to You"
10. "Boogie Man (Live!)"
11. "I'm Your Whore (Live)"
12. "Art of Persuasion (Live)"
13. "Baby Blues" (Live)
14. "You Rub Me the Right Way (Live)"
15. "Off My Rocker (Live)"
- Skin to Skin (2003)
1. "Bad Luck"
2. "Do Ya Wanna?"
3. "Skin to Skin"
4. "Good Boy Gone Bad"
5. "Just One Dance"
6. "Sharp As Knives"
7. "Ain't Standin' Still"
8. "You Rub Me the Right Way"
9. "I'm Your Whore"
10. "Bump & Grind"
11. "I Don't Care About Everything"
12. "She Turns"
13. "Nice Guys Finish Last"
- Stick It! (2006)
1. "By the Balls"
2. "Hot on Your Heels"
3. "Crush"
4. "Big Bang Boom"
5. "All Tied Up"
6. "Fool's Confession"
7. "Slow to Blow"
8. "Nowhere at All"
9. "Play Me Like a Rhythm"
10. "Weeds and Roses"
11. "About Women"
12. "No Regrets" (bonus track)
