= Taylor Rhodes =

- Rhodes in 1994.

Background information
- Born: Taylor Laurence Rhodes; Nashville, Tennessee
- Genres: Heavy metal, Rock, Pop
- Occupations: Musician; Songwriter; Producer

Taylor Laurence Rhodes is an American songwriter, producer, and musician from Nashville, Tennessee, most notable for his work with hard rock band Aerosmith since 1993.

== Music career ==
=== 1980s ===
In 1987, Rhodes co-wrote the lead-off minor hit title track from Y&T's album Contagious. The following year, he co-wrote a single on fellow glam metal band Kix's commercial breakthrough album, Blow My Fuse. This track, "Cold Blood" became a hit on rock radio stations and helped earn Rhodes a spot as producer for the next Kix album.

=== 1990s ===
Rhodes produced the 1991 Kix album Hot Wire, in addition to co-writing half of the songs from the album.

In 1993, he co-wrote "Cryin'" with Steven Tyler and Joe Perry. The song was Aerosmith's biggest single from the Get a Grip album (achieving sales of over 20 million copies worldwide), reaching #12 on the Billboard Hot 100 and #1 on the Mainstream Rock Tracks chart. For this song, Rhodes was nominated for a Grammy Award for Best Rock Song (songwriter) in 1993.

In 1994, Rhodes co-wrote the hit "Blind Man" with Tyler and Perry for the compilation Big Ones (certified 4 million in the U.S.). "Blind Man" reached #48 on the Billboard Hot 100, #3 on the Mainstream Rock Tracks chart, and #23 on the UK Singles Chart.

In 1997, Rhodes collaborated with Tyler in writing the single "Full Circle", from the Aerosmith album Nine Lives.

Rhodes co-wrote the Celine Dion hit "Where Does My Heart Beat Now", which was the most successful single from the Unison album and became Dion's first English-language hit. In 2008, it was included on the North American version of My Love: Essential Collection.

In 1997, he co-wrote the Ozzy Osbourne hit single "Back on Earth" from Osbourne's greatest hits album The Ozzman Cometh (certified 2 million in the U.S.).

=== 2000s ===
In 2000, Rhodes collaborated with Gary Louris in writing The Jayhawks's single "I'm Gonna Make You Love Me", which was used in the Ralph Lauren national TV campaign for their "Polo Blue" scent. It also appeared on the second soundtrack released from Dawson's Creek, Songs from Dawson's Creek Volume 2, and the 2001 film All Over the Guy.

Rhodes co-wrote the song "Party Up", from Hilary Duff's 2003 album Metamorphosis (achieving sales of over five million copies worldwide), her first full-length studio album that reached number one on the U.S. and Canadian charts.

Rhodes co-wrote and produced several songs on Peter Wolf's albums Up To No Good (1990) and the album Fool's Parade (1998). Rhodes also co-wrote songs on Wolf's 2010 release Midnight Souvenirs.

== Other credits ==
- "Contagious" by Y&T
- "That Don't Satisfy Me" by Brother Cane
- "Heart over Mind" by Jennifer Rush
- "All the Way" by Journey
- "Back 'n Blue" by Cheap Trick
- "Love Will Rise Again" by Loverboy
- "Amnesia" and "Faith Healer" by Tora Tora
- "Hard Reaction" by Haywire
