= Dog Police =

1980s American new wave band

- Dog Police, in their 1983 video.

Background information
- Origin: Memphis, Tennessee
- Genres: New wave; novelty
- Past members: Tony Thomas; Sam Shoup; Tom Lonardo

Dog Police was a short-lived 1980s new wave band from Memphis, Tennessee, that briefly gained notoriety for the music video of their 1982 single, "Dog Police". In 1983, the video was featured on MTV's late-night show Basement Tapes, which aired homemade music videos and asked audience members to call in and vote for their favorites. "Dog Police" won a semi-final round in January 1984, but came in second in the finals. The video played in light rotation on MTV through February 1984.

The band was a side project of the Tony Thomas Trio, a Memphis jazz band that began performing together in 1979. After their Basement Tapes appearances, the "Dog Police" video aired on USA Network's Night Flight in July 1984 and Weird Al Yankovic's MTV show Al TV in September 1984.

In 1990, an eight and a half minute television pilot was produced, titled The Dog Police, which used a modified version of the song as its theme. The cast of the pilot included Jeremy Piven and Adam Sandler, and it was filmed just before Sandler's breakthrough on Saturday Night Live.

== Band ==
The Tony Thomas Trio is a Memphis jazz band that formed in 1979, including keyboard-vocalist Tony Thomas, bassist Sam Shoup and drummer Tom Lonardo. The band's music has been described as "late 70s-era progressive-tinged fusion jazz-rock," similar to The Mothers of Invention.

As a side project, the trio formed a novelty new wave band called Dog Police, using the pseudonyms Clark Radio (Thomas), Squeek Owens (Lonardo) and Random Ax (Shoup). The band was inspired by new wave pioneers Devo.

In 1982, the band released a self-published album, Dog Police, with ten songs, including "1-800" (which also had a music video), "Are You Middle Class Enough?", "I'm Butch" and "Positive Reinforcement." The album was re-released in 2019 on vinyl and digitally by Toxic Toast Records, with the re-release including two bonus tracks.

The Tony Thomas Trio has released several non-canine albums under its correct name, including LST on Jazzoid (1979) and Progreso from Genuine Memphis Music (2010). The trio has also performed with Ella Fitzgerald and the Duke Ellington Orchestra, and they have recorded many commercial jingles.

== Song ==
The song tells the story of a young man who takes a woman out for a blind date. He describes her as "a chick from the canine scene" who scratches a flea when she gets out of his car, but he appears to be enamored with her nonetheless. They have a seat and order drinks at the Lone Star bar, but when the man comes back from a brief trip to the bathroom, he finds that his date is being arrested by the Dog Police. The second verse implies that the man went on to have "puppies" with his date.

The song's catchy chorus, repeated many times, runs:

(woof! woof! woof! woof!)
Dog Police!
Where are you coming from?
Dog Police!
Nobody knows who you are!

It has been pointed out that this chorus has the same lyrics as the theme for the "Spidey Super Stories" segment that aired from 1974 to 1977 on the educational children's TV show The Electric Company. That song was written by the show's music director, composer Gary William Friedman.

== Video ==
In the video, Tony Thomas plays the man on a date, picking up a beautiful woman wearing a dog mask. When the Dog Police show up, the three band members perform as hound-faced detectives in trench coats. The three are also seen on stage, singing in bright-colored outfits; at the end of the video, they mix the costumes, wearing the dog faces and hats but dressed as band members from the neck down.

The "Dog Police" music video was produced by Wayne Crook and directed by Joe Mulherin, with costumes and dog masks by William "Bill" Knopfler and cinematography by documentary filmmaker Larry McConkey. The club scene was shot in the Madison House, a Memphis club.

Dog Police got their big break on MTV's Basement Tapes, a late-night show that premiered in March 1983, holding a monthly competition to select the best unsigned band. Bands were invited to submit video cassettes of their performances, and viewers were given a 1-900 number to vote for their favorites. The "Dog Police" video won the semi-final round in January 1984, winning five thousand dollars in equipment and the right to compete in the finals in April. The final prize was $25,000 worth of equipment and a recording contract with EMI. The band took second place in the finals.

Following the song's January win, the video was a minor sensation on MTV, and it played in light rotation (two plays a day) during the month of February. The video also aired on USA Network's Night Flight on August 17, 1984, and MTV's Al TV on September 3.

== Television pilot ==
An eight-and-a-half minute TV pilot titled The Dog Police was produced in spring 1990. The pilot also stars three dog-faced detectives in trenchcoats and hats, with marginally more realistic canine heads, who work for the police department in an otherwise human workplace-sitcom world. The theme song states that the dogs come from outer space, with no further explanation.

The song has new lyrics, replacing the "Spidey Stories" plagiarism with a new chorus:

(woof! woof! woof! woof!)
Dog Police!
They're righting every wrong
Dog Police!
Helping wherever you go!

The three detectives are Bowser, his ex-wife Mia, and his best friend Ollie. The dogs are endowed with super-humanoid powers: they have ESP, they can run 50 miles an hour, and they can hear conversations from two miles away. Jeremy Piven appeared in the show as a beat cop, and Adam Sandler acted out the role of "Shifty," an ex-criminal who had befriended the dogs. The pilot never aired, and it was not picked up for a series.

=== Pilot plot ===
The pilot opens with a sequence of the Dog Police tracking down a pair of criminals with their psychic powers. After the theme, the dogs are introduced, and there's a scene of them interacting with fellow cops in the police precinct. An emergency call comes in, and the harried chief sends the dogs out to solve the crime. In the final scene, the dogs find Shifty taking the wheels off their police car; they have to use their special alien-canine powers to put the car back together before they can ride away to fight crime. Bowser wraps up by saying, "Every dog has his day. Ours is Saturday. Come join us for action and adventure, as we sniff out crime, and maybe a laugh or two. And remember: with us around, criminals might as well roll over and play dead." There are no credits.
