= Bastards (Saigon Kick album) =

Studio album by Saigon Kick
- Released: September 28, 1999
- Recorded: BVB Studios, garages and various bedrooms
- Genre: Hard rock
- Length: 44:31
- Label: Pony Canyon Inc.
- Producer: Jason Bieler

Saigon Kick chronology
Moments from the Fringe (1998)	Bastards (1999)	Greatest Hits Live (2000)

Professional ratings
Review scores
Source	Rating
AllMusic	2/5 stars

Bastards is the fifth and final studio album by American rock band Saigon Kick. The album was only released in the Far East and Japan.

== Track listing ==
1. "A Lot Like You" - 3:41
2. "Jehovah" - 4:29
3. "Meet Your Maker" - 3:49
4. "Break My Heart" - 4:00
5. "Sign of the Times" - 3:18
6. "So Sad to Say" - 4:15
7. "Solitary Jerk" - 3:23
8. "We Never Met" - 4:12
9. "Who's Crying Now" - 3:45
10. "Big Shot" (Billy Joel cover) - 3:52)
11. "Nearer" - 3:52

== Personnel ==
- Jason Bieler - lead vocals, guitar, programming
- Pete Dembrowski - guitar, programming
- Chris McLernon - bass on tracks 10, 11
- Rick Sanders - drums on tracks 1–10
- Phil Varone - drums on track 11
