= Moments from the Fringe =

Compilation album by Saigon Kick
- Released: 1 September 1998
- Recorded: 1990–1997
- Genre: Hard rock
- Length: 58:00
- Label: BVB Music/Dream Catcher
- Producer: Jason Bieler

Saigon Kick chronology
Greatest Mrs.: The Best of Saigon Kick (1998)	Moments from the Fringe (1998)	Bastards (1999)

Professional ratings
Review scores
Source	Rating
Kerrang!	2/5 stars

Moments from the Fringe is a Saigon Kick demo compilation put together by vocalist/guitarist Jason Bieler.

The album includes "Dizzy's Vine", the last track recorded by the reunited original line-up of the band in June 1997.

== Track listing ==
1. "Dizzy's Vine" - 5:16
2. "Colors" - 3:38
3. "Hey Hey Hey" - 3:32
4. "Homeland" - 2:41
5. "Beautiful" - 2:42
6. "My Only Friend" - 2:16
7. "Love Is on the Way" - 2:17
8. "Spidee the Rapist" - 4:22
9. "God of 42nd Street" - 1:25
10. "Feel the Same Way" - 2:06
11. "When You Were Mine" - 4:01
12. "Hostile Youth" - 3:33
13. "All I Want" - 3:56
14. "Spot Him a Beer" - 3:17
15. "You and I" - 4:13
16. "My Heart Screams" - 2:03
17. "Salvation" - 2:57
18. "The Lizard" - 4:04
