= Don't Close Your Eyes (Kix song) =

Single by Kix

from the album Blow My Fuse
- B-side: "Get It While It's Hot"; "She Dropped Me the Bomb"
- Released: 12 May 1989
- Recorded: 1988
- Genre: Glam metal
- Length: 4:17
- Label: Atlantic
- Songwriters: Bob Halligan Jr.; John Palumbo; Donnie Purnell
- Producers: Tom Werman; Duane Baron; John Purdell

Kix singles chronology
"Blow My Fuse" (1989)	"Don't Close Your Eyes" (1989)	"Get It While It's Hot" (1989)

Music video
- "Don't Close Your Eyes" on YouTube

"Don't Close Your Eyes" is a power ballad by American hard rock band Kix from their fourth studio album, Blow My Fuse (1988). It was written by Kix's bassist Donnie Purnell in collaboration with noted hard rock/heavy metal songwriter Bob Halligan Jr. and Crack the Sky frontman John Palumbo.

The song remains Kix's most successful single release, peaking at #11 on the Billboard Hot 100. It is the group's only top 40 hit, resulting in them frequently being called a one-hit wonder.

== Track listing ==
1. "Don't Close Your Eyes"
2. "Get It While It's Hot"
3. "She Dropped Me the Bomb"

== Personnel ==
- Steve Whiteman – lead vocals
- Ronnie "10/10" Younkins – guitars
- Brian "Damage" Forsythe – guitars
- Donnie Purnell – bass, keyboards, piano, backing vocals
- Jimmy "Chocolate" Chalfant – drums, percussion, backing vocals

== Charts ==
Chart (1989)	Peak position
US Billboard Hot 100	11
US Mainstream Rock (Billboard)	16

== Certifications ==
Region	Certification	Certified units/sales
United States (RIAA)	Gold	500,000^{^}
^{^} Shipments figures based on certification alone.
