= Love Is On the Way (song) =

Single by Saigon Kick

from the album The Lizard
- Released: July 1992
- Recorded: February/March 1992
- Genre: Soft rock
- Length: 4:23
- Label: Third Stone/Atlantic
- Songwriter: Jason Bieler
- Producer: Jason Bieler

Saigon Kick singles chronology
"Hostile Youth" (1992)	"Love Is On the Way" (1992)	"I Love You" (1993)

Music video
- "Love Is On the Way" on YouTube

"Love Is On the Way" is a power ballad recorded by American rock band Saigon Kick for their second studio album, The Lizard (1992). Unlike the rest of that album, this song is a straightforward acoustic ballad. It was written and produced by lead guitarist and backing vocalist Jason Bieler, and is Saigon Kick's only hit on the US Billboard Hot 100 where it peaked at number 12. The single was also certified gold by the RIAA on March 18, 1993.

== Track listing ==
All tracks are written by Jason Bieler.

US CD
No.	Title	Length
1.	"Love Is On the Way" (Edit)	3:54
2.	"Love Is On the Way" (LP Version)	4:23
Total length:		8:17

US 7" Vinyl
No.	Title	Length
1.	"Love Is On the Way"	4:23
2.	"All I Want"	3:43
Total length:		8:06

US Cassette
No.	Title	Length
1.	"Love Is On the Way" (LP Version)	4:23
2.	"Sleep" (LP Version)	1:00
Total length:		5:23

== Personnel ==
- Matt Kramer – lead vocals
- Jason Bieler – lead guitar, backing vocals

== Charts ==
=== Weekly charts ===
Chart (1992–1993)	Peak position
US Billboard Hot 100	12
US Album Rock Tracks (Billboard)	8

=== Year-end charts ===
Chart (1993)	Position
US Cash Box Top 100	48

== Certifications ==
Region	Certification	Certified units/sales
United States (RIAA)	Gold	500,000^{^}
^{^} Shipments figures based on certification alone.
