= Wild America (album) =

Studio album by Tora Tora
- Released: May 19, 1992
- Studio: Ardent Studios
- Genres: Hard rock, blues rock
- Length: 46:51
- Label: A&M
- Producers: Sir Arthur Payson; John Hampton

Tora Tora chronology
Surprise Attack (1989)	Wild America (1992)	Revolution Day (1994)

Singles from Wild America
- 1. "Dead Man's Hand" Released: 1992; 2. "Amnesia" Released: 1992; 3. "Faith Healer" Released: 1992

Wild America is the second album released by the hard rock band Tora Tora.

== Critical reception ==
Professional ratings
Review scores
Source	Rating
AllMusic	2.5/5 stars

Chris Czynszak of Decibel Geek says, "This album hit the shelves amidst a tidal wave of grunge music that was taking over the airwaves. The musical climate at the time relegated it to a slot just outside the Billboard Top 100. While it didn't get its just due back then, Chris and Aaron set out this week to shine a spotlight on this rock n’ roll masterpiece"

== Track listing ==
No.	Title	Writer(s)	Length
1.	"Wild America"	Thomas Howard; Anthony Corder; Keith Douglas	4:44
2.	"Amnesia"	Taylor Rhodes; Anthony Corder; Keith Douglas	4:47
3.	"Dead Man's Hand"	Stan Lynch; Anthony Corder; Keith Douglas	4:04
4.	"As Time Goes By"	Anthony Corder; Patrick Francis; Keith Douglas	4:22
5.	"Lay Your Money Down"	Anthony Corder; Patrick Francis; Keith Douglas; John Patterson	4:02
6.	"Shattered"	Anthony Corder; Patrick Francis; Keith Douglas	2:57
7.	"Dirty Little Secrets"	Anthony Corder; Keith Douglas	3:47
8.	"Faith Healer"	Taylor Rhodes; Anthony Corder; Keith Douglas	4:38
9.	"Cold Fever"	Anthony Corder; Keith Douglas	4:36
10.	"Nowhere to Go But Down"	Stan Lynch; Anthony Corder; Keith Douglas	4:55
11.	"City of Kings"	Anthony Corder; Patrick Francis; Keith Douglas	3:59
Total length:			46:51

== Personnel ==
- Anthony Corder – lead vocals, background vocals
- Keith Douglas – acoustic guitar, electric guitar
- Patrick Francis – bass
- John Patterson – drum, percussion

=== Additional musicians ===
"Dead Man's Hand"

- Memphis Horns
  - Wayne Jackson – trumpet
  - Andrew Love – sax
  - Jim Spake – Baritone sax
  - Clarence McDonald – piano

"As Time Goes By"

- Greg Redding – Hammond B3

"Nowhere to Go But Down"

- Tommy Burroughs – Mandolin
- Peter Hyrka – Strings

=== Additional background vocals ===
- Jim Jamison
- Tim Dills
- Jimmy Bridges
- The Jagermeisters, backing shouts on "Amnesia"
  - Anthony, Keith, Patrick, John, Jeff & Bryan

== Production ==
- Eric Howard – Dass Dept.
- Mark Howard – Drum Dept.
- Kirk Koehler – Guitar Dept.
- Joe Serling – Legal Dept.
- Chuck Beeson – Art Direction, Front Cover design
- Jean Krikorian – Package Design
- Jeff Katz – Photography

Track information and credits adapted from the album's liner notes.

== Charts ==
Chart (1992)	Peak position
US Billboard 200	132
