= Saigon Kick =

American rock band

- Saigon Kick in 1991

Background information
- Origin: Coral Springs, Florida, U.S.
- Genres: Hard rock; heavy metal; alternative rock
- Years active: 1988–2000; 2012–present
- Labels: Third Stone; Atlantic
- Spinoffs: Super-Transatlantic
- Members: Jason Bieler; Phil Varone; Steve Gibb
- Past members: Matt Kramer; Tom DeFile; Jonathan Mover; Chris McLernon; Pete Dembrowski; Ricky Sanders
- Website: saigonkick.com

Saigon Kick is an American hard rock band from Coral Springs, Florida, that formed in 1988. When they recorded their debut album and second album the band consisted of lead vocalist Matt Kramer, lead guitarist Jason Bieler, bassist Tom DeFile, and drummer Phil Varone. The modern lineup consists of Bieler, Steve Gibb, and Varone.

The band is mainly known for their second album The Lizard which reached number 80 on the Billboard 200, on the strength of its lead single "Love Is On the Way" which was a number 12 hit on the Billboard Hot 100 and is their only single to chart there. The album and "Love Is On the Way" have both been certified gold.

== History ==
=== Formation and mainstream success (1988–1992) ===
The band was formed by lead vocalist Matt Kramer and guitarist Jason Bieler along with bassist Tom DeFile and drummer Phil Varone. They gained a following on the local club scene and generated enough of a buzz to be signed to Third Stone Records in 1990. Their self-titled debut album was released in 1991. The band toured extensively but the album only made a marginal showing on sales charts.

They went immediately back into the studio to record their second album, The Lizard which was released in 1992. The album spawned the band's only hit single on the Billboard Hot 100 in the US, "Love Is On the Way", which reached number 12. Just before touring for the album commenced, bassist Tom DeFile was fired. He was replaced by ex-Cold Sweat bassist Chris McLernon. In 1996, The Lizard reached sales above 500,000 and was certified gold, their only album to achieve this certification.

=== Later years and breakup (1993–2000) ===
Looking to continue their momentum, the band quickly returned to Sweden to record their third album Water in 1993. During recording, Matt Kramer became disgruntled with the direction that the band was heading both musically and stylistically. Kramer also argued that there were financial disputes within the band and tensions reached a boiling point. He officially left the band mid-session and returned to Florida. With Kramer gone, Bieler decided to take over all of the vocal duties in addition to playing guitar on the album. Finishing touches were added to the album at sessions in Tampa, Florida. Guitarist Pete Dembrowski was hired in time for the band's 1993 tour to support the new album. Water sold significantly less than the previous album, and Atlantic decided to drop the band in 1994.

The band signed to the CMC International label in 1995, and the lineup of Bieler, McLernon, Varone, and Dembrowski released their fourth album Devil in the Details that same year. Saigon Kick then toured globally, particularly in South East Asia, but they never managed to build on the success of The Lizard in the US.

In July 1997, the band attempted a reunion with Matt Kramer on lead vocals. Phil Varone had already left the band and was replaced by drummer Ricky Sanders. This became the first five piece version of the band, consisting of Kramer, Bieler, McLernon, Dembrowski and Sanders. A new song was recorded called "Dizzy's Vine" which was released on Moments from the Fringe, a compilation album of demos and rare tracks. This lineup was quite short lived, with Bieler leaving after two live shows in Florida, effectively ending the reunion.

Bieler, Dembrowski, and Sanders recorded the final Saigon Kick studio album, Bastards for release in the Far East in 1999. The three then decided to retire the Saigon Kick name and reorganize as Super TransAtlantic.

In 2000, original members Kramer, Varone, and DeFile resurrected the Saigon Kick name for a short tour. Jason Bieler, being involved with Super TransAtlantic and wanting no part of a reunion, was replaced by DeFile's former Left For Dead bandmate Jeff Blando on guitar. After the tour, the members scattered and Saigon Kick were considered finished.

=== Post-breakup (2001–2011) ===
Bieler, Dembrowski, and Sanders, along with bassist Pat Badger of Extreme, formed Super TransAtlantic and released the band's only album Shuttlecock in 2000. They also appear on the soundtrack to the film American Pie with the song "Super Down".

Matt Kramer released his debut solo album titled War & Peas on September 11, 2002, through Lascivious Records. He also published his debut book of poetry, An American Profit, on October 31, 2007, through Lascivious Books.

Phil Varone joined Skid Row bassist Rachel Bolan's side project Prunella Scales in 1997 and recorded their album Dressing Up the Idiot. He then joined Skid Row in 2000 and can be heard on the band's album Thickskin. Varone left Skid Row in 2003, citing his ongoing battle with cocaine addiction and his need to turn his life around. Afterwards, he began promoting his movie Waking Up Dead in which a film crew chronicled several years of his life as a rock star, and the behind the scenes ups and downs that come with it. His focus is no longer primarily music, and up until the summer of 2010, he was booking and hosting stand-up comedy shows in Los Angeles. In 2010, Varone moved to Las Vegas and directed a video series for pornography studio Vivid Entertainment. He also has a signature adult toy line released by California Exotics Novelties.

Chris McLernon and Ricky Sanders teamed up to form Two Heads Music, working in television, film and advertising music production.

Jason Bieler and his brother Aaron now own a recording studio and record label in South Florida called Bieler Bros. Records.

Ricky Sanders was subsequently the touring drummer for former Bad Company lead singer Brian Howe.

Beginning in 2011, Jason Bieler began a new studio-only project named Owl Stretching.

=== Reunion (2012–present) ===
On September 21, 2012, via the official Saigon Kick page on Facebook, the following message was posted: "Saigon Kick will be reuniting with all of the original members Matt Kramer, Phil Varone, Jason Bieler, Tom Defile and Chris McLernon. Dates to be announced shortly." The band has discussed the possibility of new material.

On February 25, 2013, via the official Saigon Kick page on Facebook, they announced that Tom DeFile was no longer involved with the reunion.

A string of concerts were played in March / April 2013 in Orlando, Ft. Lauderdale, St. Petersburg, Las Vegas, Los Angeles, and New York City. An additional pair of shows were announced for December 2014 – in Las Vegas and St. Petersburg. These shows are significant in the band's history as they saw the return of original bassist Tom DeFile to stand in for Chris McLernon. The Las Vegas concert was the first performance by all four of Saigon Kick's original members in 22 years.

On May 12, 2015, the band announced that drummer Phil Varone was leaving the group, and would be replaced by Jonathan Mover for the band's scheduled 2015 live dates. Three days later, bassist Chris McLernon had announced that he was leaving the band.

== Band members ==
=== Current members ===
- Jason Bieler – lead guitar, vocals (1988–1999, 2012–present)
- Steve Gibb – rhythm guitar (2017–2023, live member 2015–2017), bass (2023–present)
- Phil Varone – drums, backing vocals (1988–1996, 2000, 2012–2015, 2024–present)

=== Former members ===
- Matt Kramer – lead vocals (1988–1993, 1997, 2000, 2012–2023)
- Tom Defile – bass (1990–1992, 2000, 2014)
- Chris McLernon – bass, backing vocals, occasional guitar (1992–1997, 2012–2015, 2017-2023)
- Pete Dembrowski – guitar, backing vocals (1993–1999)
- Ricky Sanders – drums (1997–1999)
- Jonathan Mover – drums (2017–2023, live member 2015–2017)

=== Past live members ===
- Jeff Blando – lead guitar (2000)
- Atom Ellis – bass (2015–2017)

== Discography ==
=== Albums ===
Year	Album	US	Sales / certifications
1991	Saigon Kick	—	100,000+
1992	The Lizard	80	US: Gold (500,000+)
1993	Water	—	70,000+
1995	Devil in the Details	—	15,000+
1998	Greatest Mrs.: The Best of Saigon Kick	—	5,000+
1998	Moments from the Fringe	—	—
1999	Bastards	—	—
2000	Greatest Hits Live – Around the World 1991–1996	—	—

=== Singles ===
Year	Single	Chart positions			Certifications
Year	Single	U.S. Hot 100	U.S. Main. Rock	U.S. Main. Top 40	Certifications
1992	"Love Is on the Way"	12	8	9	US: Gold
1992	"All I Want"	—	15	—	—
1993	"I Love You"	—	—	—	—
1993	"One Step Closer"	—	—	—	—
