= Bob Halligan Jr. =

American musician, producer and songwriter

- Born: Robert Sidney Halligan Jr. January 3, 1953 (age 73)
- Genres: Hard rock; heavy metal
- Occupations: Singer; musician; record producer; songwriter
- Instruments: Vocals; guitar
- Member of: Ceili Rain

Robert Sidney Halligan Jr. (born January 3, 1953) is an American singer, musician, record producer and songwriter who has collaborated with many artists, particularly in the hard rock and heavy metal genre, throughout his career. He is currently the lead vocalist and guitarist for the band Ceili Rain, a group he founded that combines Celtic, rock, and contemporary Christian music.

As a songwriter, Halligan has contributed songs to three albums by the heavy metal band Judas Priest, namely "(Take These) Chains" from 1982's Screaming for Vengeance and the single "Some Heads Are Gonna Roll" from 1984's Defenders of the Faith. Judas Priest's lead vocalist Rob Halford included another song by Halligan, "Twist", on the album Resurrection by his band Halford. In 2024, he was credited with writing the song "The Lodger" from 2024's Invincible Shield.

Halligan also worked extensively with the hard rock/heavy metal band Kix, beginning in the mid-1980s, when he co-wrote most of the songs on the band's third album, Midnite Dynamite. Incidentally, one of the most successful songs he has ever written is Kix's near-top ten hit, "Don't Close Your Eyes" (co-written with one-time Crack the Sky frontman John Palumbo and Kix bassist Donnie Purnell), which was featured on the band's follow-up album, Blow My Fuse. The song remains Kix's highest-charting single.

He also wrote the songs "Beat 'Em Up" and "Make Rock Not War" on Blue Öyster Cult's album Club Ninja (1985), "Rise to It" and "Read My Body" on Kiss' album Hot in the Shade (1989), "Could've Been You" on Cher's album Love Hurts (1991) and the single "Rock You" for Helix's album Walkin' the Razor's Edge (1984). In addition, Halligan wrote or co-wrote most of the songs on Night of the Crime by the 80s heavy metal band Icon. He also co-wrote the song "Bang Down the Door" on Bonfire's 1989's Point Blank record.

In the Christian rock domain, he has worked with Rick Cua, focusing on Cua's solo career (including his 1985 album You're My Road).

== Solo discography ==
- Window in the Wall (1991)
- Sprung (1994)
