= Matt Kramer (musician) =

American singer

- Born: August 10, 1968 (age 57)
- Genres: metal, heavy metal, hard rock
- Occupation: Singer
- Years active: 1988–present
- Label: Atlantic

Matt Kramer (born August 10, 1968) is a singer who was the lead vocalist of the American glam metal band Saigon Kick.

== Biography ==
Kramer sang on their first two albums. The second album, The Lizard, propelled Kramer's lead vocals and the band to a top-10 single on the Billboard charts, and a number-one MTV request countdown video with the ballad "Love Is on the Way", which is still played on radio stations around the world on regular rotation.

Kramer has also sung for several other bands, including Coma and Soul Star.

He released a solo album titled War and Peas, which was self-produced, and released on his label Lascivious.

He has also written a book of poetry entitled An American Profit (Lascivious Books).

== Discography ==
=== With Saigon Kick ===
- Saigon Kick (1991)
- The Lizard (1992)

=== Solo ===
- War and Peas (2002), Lascivious Recording Co.

== Literary releases / poetry books ==
- "An American Profit", 2007, Lascivious Books
- "A Book of Poems from the Smallest of Towns", 2011, Lascivious Books
