= Beggars & Thieves =

US musical group

- Origin: New York City, New York
- Genres: Pop metal, hard rock
- Years active: 1989–present
- Labels: Atlantic, Epic, MTM, Carmora Records, Frontiers
- Members: Louie Merlino; Ron Mancuso
- Past members: Bobby Chouinard; Phil Soussan; Bobby Borg; Sammy Mangiamele; Thommy Price; Erik Gloege

Beggars & Thieves is a hard rock band formed in 1989 in New York City, in the tail end of the glam metal era. It was originally formed by Louie Merlino on vocals and Ron Mancuso on guitars, and featured bassist Phil Soussan, who had played for Ozzy Osbourne, and drummer Bobby Borg, who later played for Warrant.

== History ==
=== Early years and debut album ===
The initial Beggars & Thieves line-up of Merlino, Mancuso, Soussan and Borg recorded the band's eponymous first album, but Soussan and Borg left soon after the album's release and some light touring. Soussan left to put together a band and write for long time friend Vince Neil's first solo project and Borg left the band to form the group Left For Dead and eventually join the multi-platinum group Warrant.

=== Label changes and the delayed second album ===
Mancuso, Merlino and producer Michael Barbiero decided to carry on without them. In 1991, Beggars & Thieves left Atlantic and signed with Epic. That year, they recorded a second album with producer Jim Vallance. Ron Mancuso performed both guitars and bass, and the band saw the additions of drummer Bobby Chouinard, who had previously played with the likes of Billy Squier and Gary Moore, and Alan St. John on keyboards. The album, called Look What You Create, was slated to come out in 1991 or 1992, had it not been for the sudden change in musical direction that had been brought on when the grunge movement exploded commercially in 1992 and 1993, led by bands like Nirvana and Pearl Jam.

Beggars & Thieves got caught in the corporate crossfire at Epic, which dropped the band without releasing that second album. Despite the commercial decline of hair bands in the 1990s, Beggars & Thieves carried on as a band. Look What You Create, which had been shelved by Epic in 1991, was eventually released independently in 1997 on MTM Music, with limited distribution.

=== Death of Bobby Chouinard and The Grey Album ===
Another line-up change happened as drummer Bobby Chouinard died on March 8, 1997. Sammy Mangiamele eventually took on the drums, and in 1999, again on MTM Music and again working with producer Jim Vallance, the band released their third album, called The Grey Album. Chouinard appears on four tracks on the album.

=== Later years: the Las Vegas scene and We Are the Brokenhearted ===
The band continued performing into the 2010s, now based in Las Vegas. Singer Louie Merlino occasionally sang for Vegas-based band Sin City Sinners when their singer Todd Kerns went on tour with Slash. In 2010, Beggars & Thieves released a Christmas single, "Come Christmas Time". The recording featured Erik Gloege on drums.

In December 2011, Beggars & Thieves released a new album, We Are the Brokenhearted, with a worldwide release on Frontiers Records. The album was produced by R. Bernard Mann and mixed by engineer/songwriter Kevin Churko (Ozzy Osbourne, Five Finger Death Punch) and received positive reviews. Again the band had changed drummers, with Thommy Price and Brent Fitz featuring on the album. The first video from the album for the single "We Come Undone" features a guest appearance by guitarist Jake E. Lee. The second video for the song "Innocence" was first introduced by AOL/Noisecreep in June 2012.

Apart from Beggars & Thieves, Louie Merlino sang backing vocals on Fiona's albums Fiona and Beyond The Pale. He also sang backing vocals on Alice Cooper's album Trash and worked with many other musicians.

Bobby Borg has also played for Left For Dead, Opinion, Warrant, and the Jani Lane solo project "Jabberwocky". He also authored several music business books (including The Musician's Handbook), and he is currently a professor of music industry studies at Thornton School of Music at the University of Southern California.

== Members ==
- Louie Merlino - vocals, guitar, percussion (1989–present)
- Ronnie "Ron" Mancuso - guitar, bass guitar, keyboards, backing vocals (1989–present)

== Former members ==
- Phil Soussan - bass guitar, guitar, backing vocals (1989-1991)
- Bobby Borg - drums (1989-1991)
- Bobby Chouinard - drums (1991-1997)
- Sammy Mangiamele - drums (1999)
- Erik Gloege - drums (2010)
- Thommy Price - drums (2011)

== Discography ==
- Beggars & Thieves (1990)
- Look What You Create (1997)
- The Grey Album (1999)
- Stone Alone (EP) (2010)
- We Are the Brokenhearted (2011)

== See also ==
- List of glam metal bands and artists
