= Fiona (disambiguation) =

Fiona is a feminine given name.

Fiona may also refer to:

== Animals ==
- Fiona (gastropod), a genus of sea slugs
- Fiona (hippopotamus) (2017–2026), a female hippopotamus at the Cincinnati Zoo and Botanical Garden, Ohio, United States
- Fiona pinnata, a marine mollusc, the only member of the genus Fiona and family Fionidae

== Arts, entertainment, and media ==
- Fiona (singer) (born 1961), American rock music singer-songwriter
  - Fiona (album), a 1985 album by singer Fiona
- For fictional characters named Fiona, see Fiona § Fictional characters

== See also ==
- Tropical Storm Fiona, several tropical cyclones
  - Hurricane Fiona, a 2022 Category 4 Atlantic hurricane
