= Pair-A-Dice =

American Glam metal band

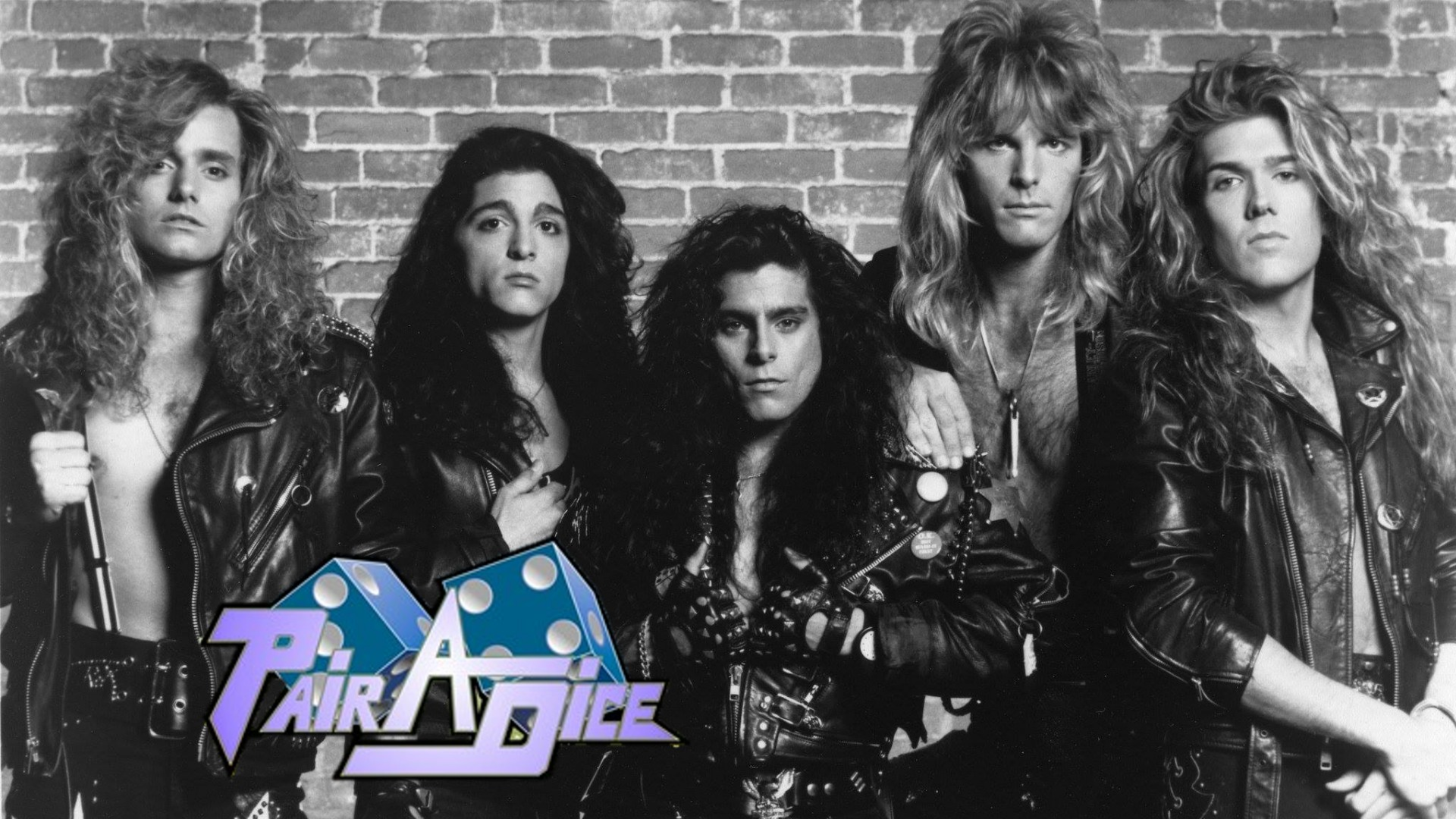
Pair-A-Dice band photo 1989 Hollywood, CA

Pair-A-Dice was an American Glam metal band founded in 1986 in Los Angeles, California, United States. The band was active until 1990, with a brief reunion in 2008 at Rocklohoma music festival, the band featured Dave Marshall on guitar, who went on to play with Vince Neil and Michael Jackson.

== History ==
1986 - 1990

Pair-A-Dice was formed in 1986 by founding members Nick Masella (Bass) and Chris Lewin (Guitar) they brought in vocalist Paul Lancia and Daz Bash (Drums) the band quickly started to build a following on the Sunset Strip playing shows with Poison and Warrant. The band added a second guitar player Billy D'Vette Chris Lewin had to leave the band for legal reasons and was replaced by Rich Carr in Nov 1987 but was short lived and the band brought in Dave Marshall in April 1988. The band recorded a 4 song demo in that year that was produced by Pair-A-Dice with some input from Robbin Crosby (Ratt)

The band was featured on MTV and played with many of L.A.'s hottest Sunset Strip bands like Warrant, Tuff, Bang Tango, Hurricane, and many more. There were two bands with similar names playing the Strip at this time that created a bit of a controversy. One was Paradise, the other was Pair-A-Dice. In 1989 the band did a short tour of Japan with Jetboy. Shortly after the return from Japan lead singer Paul Lancia left to start a solo career with his band called Lancia. Billy D'Vette took over as the lead singer and the band continued for a short time but Dave Marshall was asked to join Brunette and the band parted ways. Billy D'Vette later replaced Marc Ferrari in Cold Sweat. Dave Marshall joined Fiona to record the album Squeeze in 1991. He then joined Vince Neil's (Mötley Crüe) solo band featuring Steve Stevens, Robbie Crane and Vik Foxx and toured with Van Halen. Daz Bash played drums for the Alice Cooper video "I Got a Line on You" for the movie Iron Eagle II.

2008 the band signed to Retrospect Records and released the demos from 1988 & 1989 this was followed up by a reunion of the band that played at Rocklahoma later that year. In 2014 the band signed with Demon Doll records and released "Midnight Train" that included unreleased material from 1989.

== Discography ==
- 1988 - Demo
- 2008 - Pair A Dice - Retrospect Records
- 2014 - Midnight Train - Demon Doll Records
- 2013 - Death to All But... Hollywood Hair Metal

== Members ==
- Paul Lancia - Vocals
- Dave Marshall - Guitar
- Billy D'Vette- Guitar
- Nick Masela- Bass
- Daz Bash - Drums

=== Former members ===
- Chris Lewin - Guitar (1986)
- Rich Carr - Guitar (1987)

=== Equipment ===
- BC Rich Guitars
- Tom Anderson Guitars
- Naylor Amps
