= Dave Marshall (musician) =

American musician

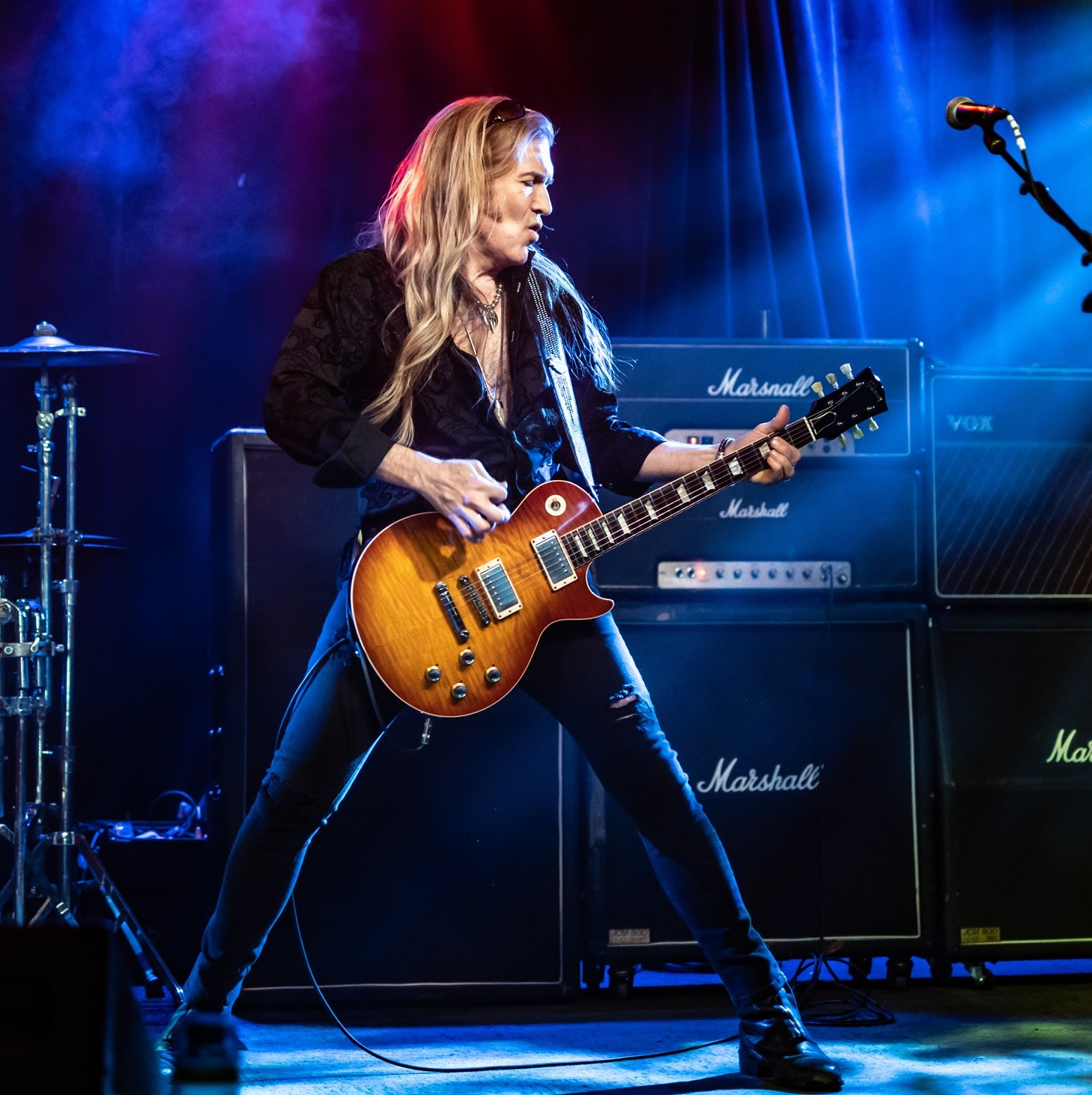

Background information
- Born
- Genres: Rock; Hard rock; Metal; Pop
- Instruments: Guitar, keyboard, piano

Dave Marshall is an American guitarist who has performed with Pair-A-Dice, Fiona, Vince Neil, Slaughter, and Michael Jackson. He was a member of the Nashville-based band Scrap Metal, with Mark Slaughter, Kelly Keagy, and Nelson.

== Early life and career ==
Dave Marshall moved to Hollywood, California from the midwest in the mid 80s to attend GIT (Musicians Institute) He joined a few bands, including Mickey Knight, and Pair-A-Dice, a Sunset Strip Local favorite band that toured Japan in 1989. In 1990 he played with Brunette, a band that later formed Hardline (band). He paired up in 1991 with Fiona to record the album Squeeze.

In 1993 he joined the Vince Neil's (Mötley Crüe) solo band featuring Steve Stevens, Robbie Crane and Vik Foxx and toured with Van Halen, also touring worldwide, including multiple nights at Budokan. In 1995 he toured with Slaughter, filling-in for guitarist Tim Kelly. He also toured with Slaughter in 1998 after Tim Kelly passed, performing in Japan, Mexico, and in the US. He also performed on the Michael Jackson HIStory World Tour (1996–1998). Dave started working as a musical director on major tours. When not playing, Dave is a highly regarded guitar tech consultant, having served a wide array of legendary guitar players like Steve Vai, Peter Frampton, James Burton, Eddie Van Halen, Nine Inch Nails, Luis Miguel, A Perfect Circle, John Fogerty, Rod Stewart and more. As a guitar technician, he almost always performed double duty, playing additional guitar parts on and off stage.

== Discography ==
=== Fiona ===
- Squeeze (1992)

=== Vince Neil ===
- Exposed (Vince Neil album)

=== Pair A Dice ===
- Midnight Train (2014)

== Gear ==
While touring with Vince Neil, Dave Marshall used an electric guitar amp produced by Naylor amps.

Main touring guitar is Tom Anderson Guitarworks.
