= 1999 Mexico floods =

1999 flood in Mexico

October 1999 Mexico flood
- Satellite image of Tropical Depression Eleven near eastern Mexico
- Date: September–October 1999
- Location: Central America, Mexico
- Deaths: 636 total
- Property damage: $491.3 million (1999 USD); 4.7 billion pesos (1999 MXN) (Note: All damage totals are in 1999 United States dollars (USD). In Mexico, totals are in USD first, then converted to 1999 Mexican pesos (MXN) using the Oanda Corporation website.)

In October 1999, severe flooding affected portions of eastern Mexico and Central America. Rainfall in September preceded the primary event in Mexico, which moistened soils. On October 4, Tropical Depression Eleven developed in the Gulf of Mexico, which drew humidity from the gulf and the Pacific Ocean to produce torrential rainfall in mountainous regions of eastern Mexico, reaching 43.23 in (1,098 mm) in Jalacingo, Veracruz. This was the third-highest tropical cyclone-related rainfall total in Mexico from 1980–2006, and the event caused the highest rainfall related to tropical cyclones in Veracruz, Hidalgo, and Puebla. In some locations, the daily rainfall represented over 10% of the annual precipitation total. The heaviest rainfall occurred in mountainous regions that were the mouths of several rivers. A broad trough absorbed the depression on October 6, and rainfall continued for the next few days. Additional rainfall occurred in Tabasco state on October 18. The floods were estimated as a 1 in 67 year event in one location, although such floods are expected to affect eastern Mexico twice per century, the last time being 1944.

Throughout Mexico, the floods killed at least 379 people, according to the federal government, and as many as 600 according to relief agencies; the Centre for Research on the Epidemiology of Disasters later estimated there were 636 deaths, and damage in Mexico was estimated at $451.3 million (4.3 billion pesos). Nationwide, the floods damaged or destroyed 90,000 houses, which left about 500,000 people homeless. Flooding caused thousands of landslides, many in more populated areas than the flooding in 1944. The floods also caused 39 rivers to overflow, and the combination of floods and landslides destroyed bridges, houses, widespread crop fields, schools, and electrical networks. Impact was worst in Puebla, where damage totaled $240 million (2.1 billion pesos) and many roads were washed out. Landslides in the state killed 107 people in Teziutlán. Elsewhere in the country, the floods washed crocodiles into the streets of Villahermosa, the capital of Tabasco, and in Oaxaca, the rainfall occurred after an earthquake left thousands homeless. Flooding also extended into Central America in late September through early October, causing $40 million (385 million pesos) in crop damage and 70 deaths.

After the floods receded, Mexican President Ernesto Zedillo ordered the Department of National Defense to utilize all resources to assist the people affected by the floods. More than 94,000 people stayed at 896 shelters after being evacuated due to the floods. The federal government allocated $234 million (2.34 billion pesos) in relief, which was smaller than the damage total. Widespread medical teams assisted tens of thousands of homes, and due to prevention measures, there were no outbreaks of diseases. Roads and electrical systems were gradually restored, and students returned to school after repairs were made. Residents throughout Mexico sent supplies to the Mexican Red Cross, including 500 tons of food and water, and international agencies sent money and supplies to the flood victims.

== Meteorological history ==
Storm path of the tropical depression Map key Saffir–Simpson scale Tropical depression (≤38 mph, ≤62 km/h) Tropical storm (39–73 mph, 63–118 km/h) Category 1 (74–95 mph, 119–153 km/h) Category 2 (96–110 mph, 154–177 km/h) Category 3 (111–129 mph, 178–208 km/h) Category 4 (130–156 mph, 209–251 km/h) Category 5 (≥157 mph, ≥252 km/h) Unknown Storm type Tropical cyclone Subtropical cyclone Extratropical cyclone, remnant low, tropical disturbance, or monsoon depression

Beginning around September 10, heavy rainfall occurred sporadically in southern Mexico and into Central America, influenced by a broader storm system related to Hurricane Floyd. Toward the end of September, heavy rainfall occurred in the mountains of northeastern Mexico, which prompted officials to open flood gates. The rains occurred throughout Mexico for about two weeks before the worst of the precipitation began, and saturated soils before the heaviest rainfall in October.

On October 4, Tropical Depression Eleven developed in the Bay of Campeche about 145 mi (233 km) northeast of Veracruz, having originated from a tropical wave. Due to weak steering currents, the depression moved erratically, initially to the south and later to the west-northwest. It failed to intensify due to a surface trough over the central and eastern Gulf of Mexico, connected to a cold front. While the depression was drifting, it produced large areas of convection over eastern Mexico, aided by high humidity from the gulf and from the Pacific Ocean. On October 6, the circulation was absorbed into the trough, although rainfall continued to occur through October 9. A week later, Hurricane Irene affected southern Mexico with strong rains. Additional rainfall occurred on October 18 in Tabasco, causing further flooding; the waters in the state began receding on October 28. The wet conditions in eastern Mexico, occurring at the same time as hot, dry conditions elsewhere in the country, were possibly related to La Niña conditions.

Due to easterly wind shear and the convection along the storm's western periphery, the tropical depression dropped heavy rainfall in the states of Puebla, Tabasco, Hidalgo, and Veracruz, peaking at 43.23 in (1,098 mm) in Jalacingo, Veracruz. This was the highest rainfall total in Veracruz from 1981 to 2010; statewide record peaks were also reported in Puebla and Hidalgo. The depression was the third wettest tropical cyclone in Mexico from 1983 to 2006, after Hurricane Wilma in 2005 and Tropical Storm Frances in 1998. The heaviest of the rainfall occurred along the Sierra Madre Oriental, which is a mountain range in eastern Mexico and the source for several regionally important rivers. Tuxpan, Veracruz recorded 6.2 in (157.7 mm) in a 24‑hour period on October 4, which was greater than the average October rainfall there and was about one-ninth of the annual total. A station in Hidalgo reported 4.02 in (102 mm) on October 4, which was also greater than the average October rainfall and was about one-eighth of the annual total. The return period was estimated as high as a 1 in 67 year event at Xicotepec, Puebla, and it was estimated that such floods in Mexico occur only twice per century; similar floods occurred in September 1944 in the same region, although the area was less populated then.

== Impact ==
=== Mexico ===
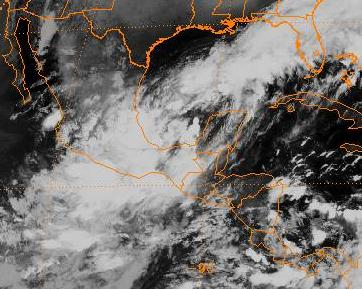
Another satellite view of Tropical Depression Eleven near eastern Mexico

Across eastern Mexico, the heavy rainfall caused mudslides and floods, which damaged or destroyed 90,000 houses, and damaged or destroyed about 3,088,000 acres (1,250,000 hectares) of crop fields; thousands of livestock were also killed. The floods affected 819 Municipalities of Mexico in 17 states and the federal district, leaving about 500,000 people homeless, of whom half were in Tabasco and Veracruz states. Several ports were closed due to the floods. Although power lines were downed, most electrical systems were not damaged, and power was quickly restored within a week in most areas. A total of 39 rivers overflowed, which washed away bridges, roads, dams, and some entire houses, and there were thousands of landslides, mostly in unpopulated areas. Collectively, 28 federal highways and 300 rural roads were closed or damaged. The federal highway network sustained damage in 1,237 locations as a result of 1,164 landslides or mudslides and 28 damaged bridges. Damage was estimated at $451.3 million (4.3 billion pesos).

The death toll was 61 as of October 6, and a day later it reached about 250. The Mexican government reported 341 deaths on October 13, excluding victims in a landslide in Acalama, Puebla, and the total reached 379 by October 28. However, non-government agencies reported 500 deaths in Mexico by October 9, and as many as 600 as of mid-November. The International Disaster Database, published by the Centre for Research on the Epidemiology of Disasters, reported 636 deaths from the floods. The high death toll, in comparison to similar floods in 1944, was due to more landslides and flooding in more populated areas. About 500,000 people were injured.

In Tulancingo, Hidalgo, a nearby river flooded 6,750 houses and buildings, reaching 3 ft (1 m) in some places and affecting about half of the town. Elsewhere in Hidalgo, the rains collapsed a mine in San Salvador, burying seven people. A total of 8,342 people had to evacuate to 75 shelters. The combination of washouts and landslides damaged 168 rural roads and 36 state highways, causing $3.85 million (38 million pesos) in damage. Fourteen people died statewide. In the state of Tabasco, rivers reached their highest stage in about 40 years, affecting about 75% of the state by October 8. About 5 ft (1.5 m) of flooding was reported in some places, which washed crocodiles into streets in the capital city, Villahermosa. Statewide, over 58,000 people had to evacuate due to flooding, including portions of Villahermosa, where 90,955 people were injured. In the city, 1,600 prisoners had to be transported after a jail was flooded. Nine people died in the state. Additional floods caused further flooding later in October.

Flooding was considered worst in Puebla, and were the worst floods in about 400 years, according to newspaper reports. A total of 21,342 people evacuated their houses to 116 shelters, mostly in the state's northern portion. The floods affected 16,511 houses and 199 schools. In Teziutlán, with a population of about 50,000, it is estimated the city received nearly half of its annual rainfall in about three days. Nine entire communities became isolated due to the floods, and the small village of Patla sustained heavy damage after the Necaxa River changed its course closer to the town. Widespread landslides occurred, including over 80 in Teziutlán alone; one mudslide there destroyed 80 houses. Some of the landslides occurred along rivers and produced new lakes, but 85% of these broke within the first year. Population growth, primarily in Teziutlán and Zaragoza, occurred in landslide-prone areas along mountains. Along Sierra Norte de Puebla, deforestation contributed to additional landslides. A landslide covered the Zacatepec River near Zempoala, creating a natural dam and a small lake. Mudslides buried at least 16 people at a school in Pantepec, and a deforested hill caused a landslide in the Indigenous village of Acalama, which covered up to 170 people. Most had fled to a church that was also covered, and it is estimated that only 30 people survived in the village. Statewide, 263 people were killed, including 107 in Teziutlán who were buried by mudslides, becoming the worst disaster in the history of the town. In the village of Tetela de Ocampo, 31 people died. In Puebla, 30,000 people were injured, and 81 municipalities sustained damage, with statewide damage estimated at about $240 million (2.1 billion pesos).

In Veracruz, 124 people were killed in the event, including three in a rescue helicopter crash. About 23,500 people statewide had to evacuate to emergency shelters in 452 communities. The governor declared the state as a disaster zone after 13 rivers exceeded their banks, and two entire villages were washed away. A total of 75,135 people were injured in Veracruz, about one third of whom became homeless due to the floods. In rural areas, 77,123 people lost power. Statewide, 11 bridges were damaged, and 22 portions along the Poza Rica-Veracruz highway was damaged. In Zaragoza, the floods destroyed 91% of the year's crops.

There were six deaths in Chiapas during the flood event. In the state, four dams reached near record water levels. In Oaxaca, the rains left thousands homeless and disrupted work to clean up after an earthquake a week prior. The floods displaced 800 families, and six people died in the state. The floods spread as far west as Jalisco, where 3 roads were destroyed and 12 municipalities were affected. In nearby Michoacán, 5,000 people were injured.

=== Central America ===
Portions of Central America also experienced flooding related to the rains, causing landslides and washing away bridges and roads. Over 100,000 people in the region had to leave their homes, and there were 70 deaths in Central America. In Guatemala, 12 people died related to the flooding, including two due to cholera from stagnant waters. Officials declared a red alert in Honduras, which mobilized the army for potential relief work and caused Red Cross shelters to open; the alert was dropped after rainfall eased on October 8. About 6,500 people evacuated in Honduras after four rivers flooded, which damaged or destroyed several houses. About 6,000 people had to evacuate in Sula Valley in the northern portion of the country, after the government released water from the El Cajón Dam. Damage was estimated at $1.5 million (14 million pesos), and there were 34 deaths. Due to people having to evacuate, several schools were closed. The country was severely affected by Hurricane Mitch only a year prior, and bridges that were rebuilt after the hurricane were again destroyed.

A red alert was also issued in El Salvador, and 3,000 people were evacuated; eight people drowned in the country. The Río Negro in Nicaragua washed away a bridge, and two bridges were destroyed along the Pan-American Highway. A state of emergency was issued in the country. Damage was estimated at $10 million (96 million pesos), and there were 11 deaths. Further south in Costa Rica, the floods damaged 31 bridges and caused 1,600 people to evacuate. Across Central America, the rainfall caused about $40 million (385 million pesos) in crop damage.

== Aftermath ==
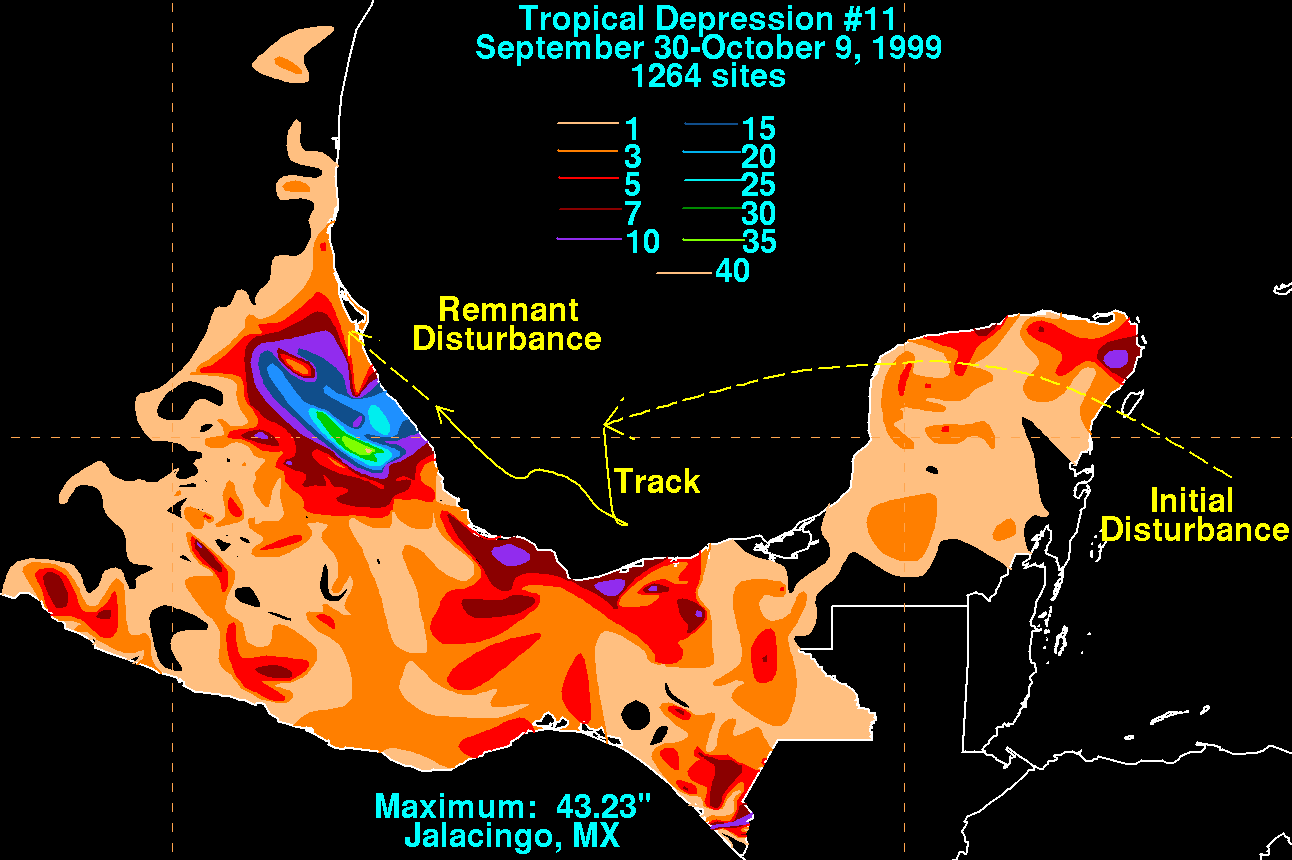
Rainfall totals in Mexico from Tropical Depression Eleven

Mexican President Ernesto Zedillo ordered the Department of National Defense to utilize all resources to assist the people affected by the floods, including federal workers being deployed to disaster areas. Zedillo noted that despite efforts to mitigate against natural disasters, "we cannot expect to control river water levels produced by rains that have surpassed all historical precedents." He personally visited flooded areas of Veracruz, Puebla, Tabasco, and Oaxaca, having canceled a trip to Europe to focus on the disaster. The president ordered nearly all agencies of government to work together to quickly return conditions back to normal, utilizing 12,000 soldiers. Ahead of a presidential election in 2000, Zedillo also requested for politicians to avoid seeking gain in politicizing the tragedy.

By October 22, over 72,000 people were housed in 560 shelters nationwide. Additional evacuations occurred after further floods impacted Tabasco weeks after the initial deluge, and by October 25, 94,203 people were staying in 896 shelters. The Mexican Department of Health declared a sanitary alert in six states, and 354 medical teams operated in 894 communities to assist 50,000 homes. The Secretaría de Gobernación declared Tabasco, Veracruz, Hidalgo and Puebla as disaster areas, which allocated federal funding for relief. The National Fund for Natural Disasters allocated $234 million (2.34 billion pesos) in emergency relief, including $41.5 million (400 million pesos) in Oaxaca where the earthquake previously struck; this was smaller than the flood's damage total. The repair cost in Puebla alone was estimated at $200 million (1.83 billion pesos), which was largely completed within two years and dealt with repairing roads and protecting cities from landslide and flood mitigation.

Search and rescue teams operated across eastern Mexico, and initially they worked amid rainfall. The continuing rains and cut off communications disrupted relief efforts, as did the topography of the affected areas. In Puebla, the federal government donated 219 mules and 81 horses to assist in traveling to isolated areas. People used shovels and bare hands to remove mud and concrete in areas where they could not utilize machines. In Tulancingo, Hidalgo, people used rowboats to rescue stranded residents trapped by the flooding. Search and rescue missions ended on October 15, after 7,112 people were rescued from what the government described as "high-risk situations." To control the flooding, workers released water from dams and reservoirs. In Hidalgo, released water from a dam flooded two rivers and forced thousands of additional evacuations. In Tenango in Puebla, a dam developed a foot-long crack, which sparked evacuations and prompted workers to fill it with dirt and rocks. Stagnant waters raised fears for an outbreak of dengue fever; however, no flood-related epidemics occurred, and the waters were disinfected to prevent disease spread. By October 22, there were only 21 cases of dengue and 4 cases of malaria, both fewer than normal. On October 23, the Peñitas Dam was opened to maintain its integrity, causing downstream flooding. It was closed after water flow rates decreased. After the floods, some areas in Mexico faced water shortages. As a result, the National Water Commission initially distributed about 300,000 litres of drinking water each day, and later increased it to 487,000 litres per day, reaching 4 million litres of distributed water by October 19. Water service was gradually repaired, and by October 19, 70 of the 90 damaged water systems in Veracruz were restored. Equipment used for flood efforts were removed from duty after the floods receded.

Workers distributed about 4,100 tons of food and 200,000 litres of milk to the affected victims, by both land and air. In Veracruz, only 9 helicopters were utilized to distribute food and water to isolated areas. About 948 tons of medicine was also distributed. Helicopters assisted in transporting people to shelters. In Veracruz alone, 34 people were rescued by boat and 1,131 by aircraft. In Puebla and Veracruz, 9,551 troops were stationed to assist in relief work, utilizing 48 helicopters, 4 Hercules planes, and 10 boats. Between Veracruz and Hidalgo, the Department of Social Development distributed about 18,500 mattresses and other relief items. Workers quickly made repairs to highways, and by October 19, all of the 28 damaged federal highways were provisionally reopened; some of the reopened highways had to undergo additional construction work. The military worked to reopen other roads. In Veracruz, the Director of the Federal Electricity Commission noted that repairs to electrical systems were difficult in the immediate aftermath of the floods. Planes flew generators into Gutiérrez Zamora, Veracruz, mainly for hospitals, and by October 20, 90% of the affected areas had their power restored. President Zedillo announced on October 11 that the government would begin building new houses, part of the Emergency Housing Program initiative. In Puebla, the initial stages of the program would involve rebuilding 1,200 houses and moving 500 houses to safer lands. The Mexican government estimated that the housing program would help 37,000 families. Mexico's agricultural ministry provided assistance for farmers to replant lost crops. Through the Temporary Employment Program, the federal government temporarily hired about 1 million people who lost their homes or farms. Students gradually returned to school after repairs were made, and by October 28, over 800,000 students who were affected were able to return to school, including all of Oaxaca and Hidalgo. The area in Teziutlán, Puebla affected by the mudslide was never rebuilt, due to being labeled a high-risk area.

Residents in some portions of the country became angry due to lack of assistance. In the town of Lazaro Cardenas in Tabasco, residents opened ditches to alleviate flooding on their streets, which flooding thousands of vehicles along a section of highway near the state's capital, Villahermosa. In the capital city, which remained submerged by floodwaters for a week, residents protested the sandbagging efforts after waters were redirected to some neighborhoods. Due to the protests, police officers beat and arrested 100 people. The Federal Consumer Protection Agency issued warnings to businesses accused of price gouging for water and other basic products. Isolated villages experienced food shortages due to cut off roads.

Despite growing protests and the increasing death toll, President Zedillo did not initially request for international aid, believing that the country had the necessary resources, although by October 15 he changed his position. The office of Secretary-General of the United Nations Kofi Annan issued a statement of condolences to those affected by the tragedy. The United States Agency for International Development (USAID) donated $100,000 on October 13. The European Commission approved €1 million (1999 euros) in aid to be distributed through the German and Spanish Red Cross agencies. The Church World Service launched an appeal on October 8 to raise funds, and provided $47,000 worth of blankets and bedding. The Catholic Relief Services pledged $100,000 for flood victims in Mexico. Thousands of residents in Mexico donated 500 tons of food, along with water, clothes, and medicine to the Mexican Red Cross. After additional flooding in Tabasco, the Mexican Red Cross sent 254 metric tonnes of food, water, medicine, and clothing to the state. The American Red Cross donated about $100,000 to its Mexican counterpart. Direct Relief sent two loads of medicine and blankets to Oaxaca. Adventist Development and Relief Agency provided food for about 25,000 people.

Outside of Mexico, Honduras's government provided food and shelter for its citizens, but was unable to properly address health-related needs. As a result, the Save the Children Fund provided $83,000 worth of medicine and latrines to 40 municipalities in Honduras.

== See also ==
- List of floods
- Timeline of the 1999 Atlantic hurricane season
