= Earth rainfall climatology =

Study of rainfall

Long-term mean precipitation by month

Earth rainfall climatology Is the study of rainfall, a sub-field of meteorology. Formally, a wider study includes water falling as ice crystals, i.e. hail, sleet, snow (parts of the hydrological cycle known as precipitation). The aim of rainfall climatology is to measure, understand and predict rain distribution across different regions of planet Earth, a factor of air pressure, humidity, topography, cloud type and raindrop size, via direct measurement and remote sensing data acquisition. Current technologies accurately predict rainfall 3–4 days in advance using numerical weather prediction. Geostationary orbiting satellites gather IR and visual wavelength data to measure realtime localised rainfall by estimating cloud albedo, water content, and the corresponding probability of rain.

Geographic distribution of rain is largely governed by climate type, topography and habitat humidity. In mountainous areas, heavy precipitation is possible where the upslope flow is maximized within windward sides of the terrain at elevation. On the leeward side of mountains, desert climates can exist due to the dry air caused by compressional heating. The movement of the monsoon trough, or Intertropical Convergence Zone, brings rainy seasons to savannah climes. The urban heat island effect leads to increased rainfall, both in amounts and intensity, downwind of cities. Warming may also cause changes in the precipitation pattern globally, including wetter conditions at high latitudes and in some wet tropical areas. Precipitation is a major component of the water cycle, and is responsible for depositing most of the fresh water on the planet. Approximately 486,000 cubic kilometres (117,000 mi^{3}) of water falls as precipitation each year; 373,000 cubic kilometres (89,000 mi^{3}) of it over the oceans. Given the Earth's surface area, that means the globally averaged annual precipitation is 954 millimetres (37.6 in). Climate classification systems such as the Köppen climate classification system use average annual rainfall to help differentiate between differing climate regimes.

Most of Australia is semi-arid or desert, making it the world's driest continent (excluding Antarctica). Australia's rainfall is mainly regulated by the movement of the alien monsoon trough during the summer rainy season, with lesser amounts falling during the winter and spring in its southernmost sections.

Almost whole North Africa is semi-arid, arid or hyper-arid, containing the Sahara Desert which is the largest hot desert in the world, while central Africa (known as Sub-Saharan Africa) sees an annual rainy season regulated by the movement of the Intertropical Convergence Zone or monsoon trough, though the Sahel Belt located at the south of the Sahara Desert knows an extremely intense and a nearly permanent dry season and only receives minimum summer rainfall.

Across Asia, a large annual rainfall minimum, composed primarily of deserts, stretches from the Gobi Desert in Mongolia west-southwest through Pakistan and Iran into the Arabian Desert in Saudi Arabia. In Asia, rainfall is favored across its southern portion from India east and northeast across the Philippines and southern China into Japan due to the monsoon advecting moisture primarily from the Indian Ocean into the region. Similar, but weaker, monsoon circulations are present over North America and Australia.

In Europe, the wettest regions are in the Alps and downwind of bodies of water, particularly the Atlantic west coasts.

Within North America, the drier areas of the United States are the Desert Southwest, Great Basin, valleys of northeast Arizona, eastern Utah, central Wyoming, and the Columbia Basin. Other dry regions within the continent are far northern Canada and the Sonoran Desert of northwest Mexico. The Pacific Northwest United States, the Rockies of British Columbia, and the coastal ranges of Alaska are the wettest locations in North America. The equatorial region near the Intertropical Convergence Zone (ITCZ), or monsoon trough, is the wettest part of the world's continents. Annually, the rain belt within the tropics marches northward by August, then moves back southwards into the Southern Hemisphere by February and March.

== Role in Köppen climate classification ==
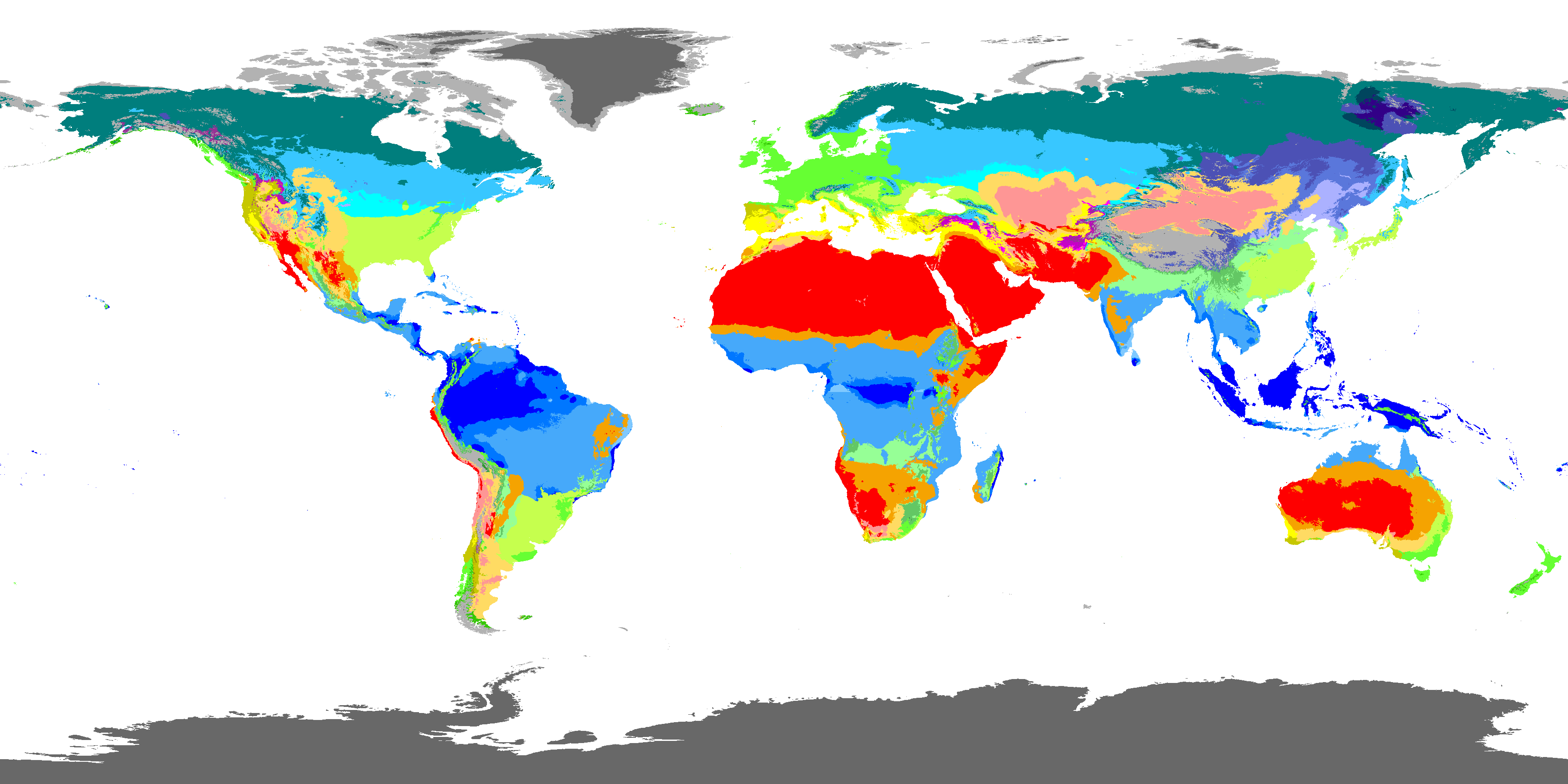
Updated Köppen–Geiger climate map: Af Am Aw / BWh BWk BSh BSk / Csa Csb / Cwa Cwb / Cfa Cfb Cfc / Dsa Dsb Dsc Dsd / Dwa Dwb Dwc Dwd / Dfa Dfb Dfc Dfd / ET EF

The Köppen classification depends on average monthly values of temperature and precipitation. The most commonly used form of the Köppen classification has five primary types labeled A through E. Specifically, the primary types are A, tropical; B, dry; C, mild mid-latitude; D, cold mid-latitude; and E, polar. The five primary classifications can be further divided into secondary classifications such as rain forest, monsoon, tropical savanna, humid subtropical, humid continental, oceanic climate, Mediterranean climate, steppe, subarctic climate, tundra, polar ice cap, and desert.

Rain forests are characterized by high rainfall, with definitions setting minimum normal annual rainfall between 1,750 millimetres (69 in) and 2,000 millimetres (79 in). A tropical savanna is a grassland biome located in semi-arid to semi-humid climate regions of subtropical and tropical latitudes, with rainfall between 750 millimetres (30 in) and 1,270 millimetres (50 in) a year. They are widespread on Africa, and are also found in India, the northern parts of South America, Malaysia, and Australia. The humid subtropical climate zone where winter rainfall (and sometimes snowfall) is associated with large storms that the westerlies steer from west to east. Most summer rainfall occurs during thunderstorms and from occasional tropical cyclones. Humid subtropical climates lie on the east side continents, roughly between latitudes 20° and 40° degrees away from the equator.

An oceanic (or maritime) climate is typically found along the west coasts at the middle latitudes of all the world's continents, bordering cool oceans, as well as southeastern Australia, and is accompanied by plentiful precipitation year-round. The Mediterranean climate regime resembles the climate of the lands in the Mediterranean Basin, parts of western North America, parts of Western and South Australia, in southwestern South Africa and in parts of central Chile. The climate is characterized by hot, dry summers and cool, wet winters. A steppe is a dry grassland. Subarctic climates are cold with continuous permafrost and little precipitation.

The tropical zones have the highest number of storm events followed by the temperate climate. In a recent study, researchers from 63 countries combined 30-minutes rainfall data in order to estimate the global rainfall erosivity (an index combining the amount, frequency and intensity of rainfall). The arid and cold climate zones have very low number of erosive events.

== Africa ==
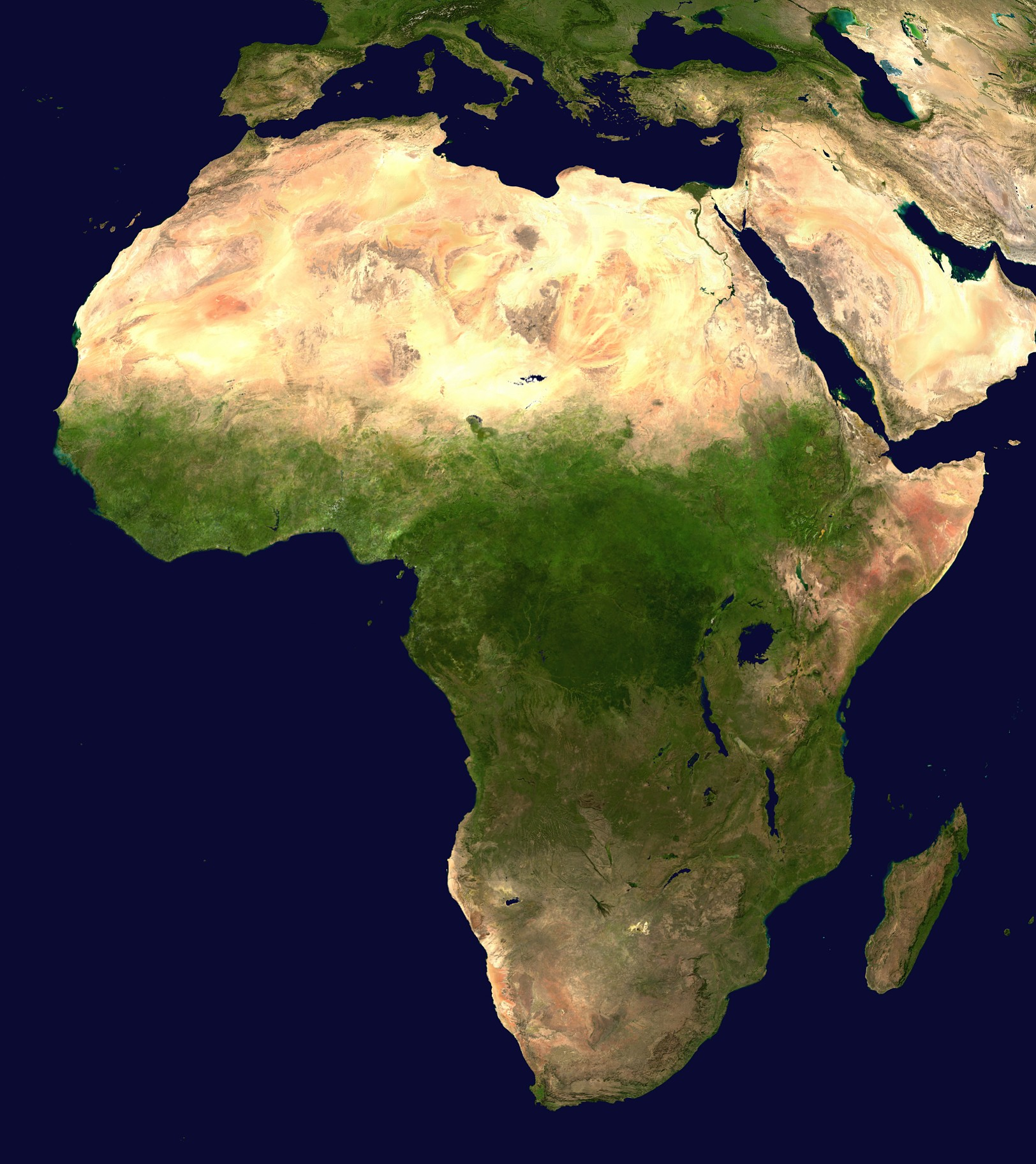
A map of Africa showing the ecological break around the Sahara

The northern half of the continent is primarily desert, containing the vast Sahara Desert, while its southern areas contain both savanna and plains, and its central portion contains very dense jungle (rainforest) regions. The equatorial region near the Intertropical Convergence Zone is the wettest portion of the continent. Annually, the rain belt across the continent marches northward into Sub-Saharan Africa by August, then moves back southward into south-central Africa by March. Mesoscale convective systems which form in tandem with tropical waves that move along the Intertropical Convergence Zone during the summer months become the seedlings for tropical cyclones which form in the northern Atlantic and northeast Pacific oceans. Areas with a savannah climate in Sub-Saharan Africa, such as Ghana, Burkina Faso, Darfur, Eritrea, Ethiopia, and Botswana have a distinct rainy season.

Within of Madagascar, trade winds bring moisture up the eastern slopes of the island, which is deposited as rainfall, and brings drier downslope winds to areas south and west leaving the western sections of the island in a rain shadow. This leads to significantly more rainfall over northeast sections of the island than the southwestern portions of Madagascar. Southern Africa receives most of its rainfall from summer convective storms and with extratropical cyclones moving through the Westerlies. Once a decade, tropical cyclones lead to excessive rainfall across the region.

== Asia ==
A large annual rainfall minimum, composed primarily of deserts, stretches from the Gobi Desert in Mongolia west-southwest through Pakistan and Iran into the Arabian Desert in Saudi Arabia. Rainfall around the continent is favored across its southern portion from India east and northeast across the Philippines and southern China into Japan due to the monsoon advecting moisture primarily from the Indian Ocean into the region. The monsoon trough can reach as far north as the 40th parallel in East Asia during August before moving southward thereafter. Its poleward progression is accelerated by the onset of the summer monsoon which is characterized by the development of lower air pressure (a thermal low) over the warmest part of Asia. Cherrapunji, situated on the southern slopes of the Eastern Himalaya in Shillong, India is one of the wettest places on Earth, with an average annual rainfall of 11,430 mm (450 in). The highest recorded rainfall in a single year was 22,987 mm (904.9 in) in 1861. The 38-year average at Mawsynram, Meghalaya, India is 11,873 mm (467.4 in). Lower rainfall maxima are found on the Mediterranean and Black Sea coasts of Turkey and the mountains of Tajikistan.

== Australia ==
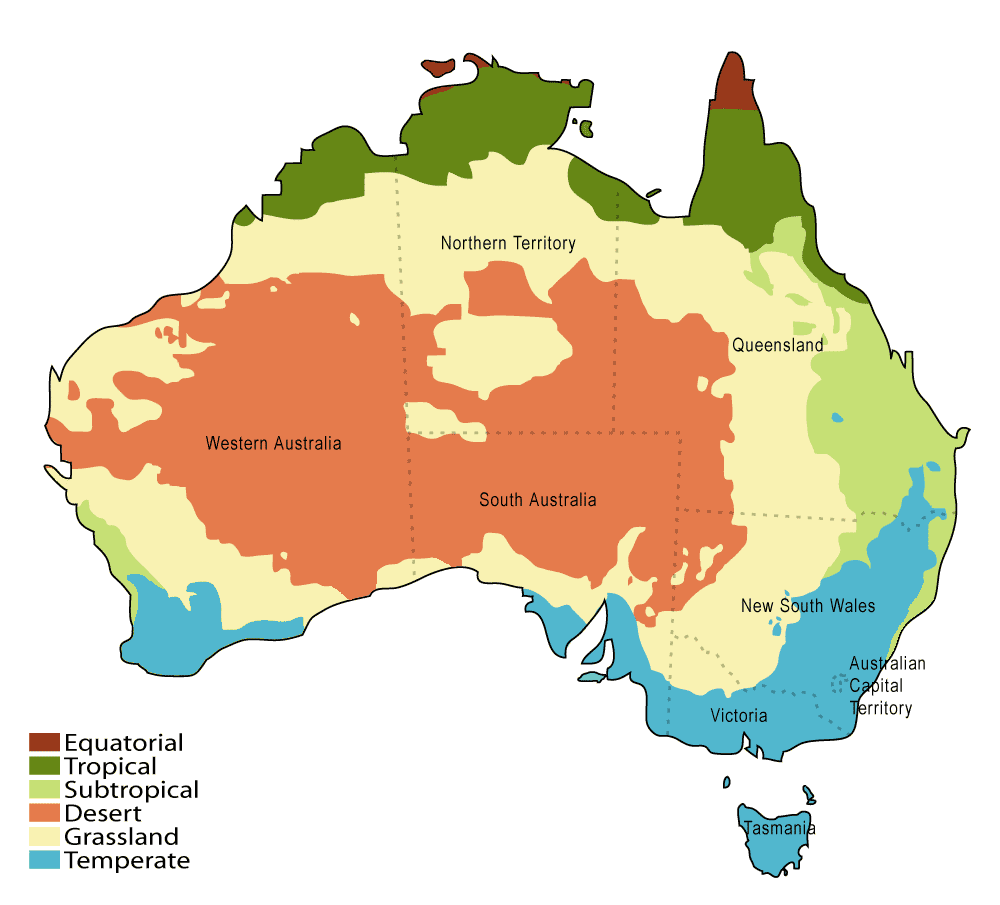
Australia's climatic zones

Most of Australia is semi-arid or desert, making it the world's driest continent after Antarctica. The movement of the monsoon trough is linked to the peak of the rainy season within the continent. Northern portions of the continent see the most rainfall, which is concentrated in the summer months. During winter and spring southern Australia sees its maximum rainfall. The interior desert sees its greatest rainfall during spring and summer. The wettest spot is Mount Bellenden Ker in the north-east of the country records an average of 8,000 millimetres (310 in) per year, with over 12,000 millimetres (470 in) of rain recorded in the year 2000. While Melbourne is thought of as being significantly wetter than Sydney, Sydney receives an average of 1212 mm (47.8 in) of rain per year compared to Melbourne's 650 mm (25.5 in), although Sydney is significantly sunnier and receives less days of rain.

== New Zealand ==
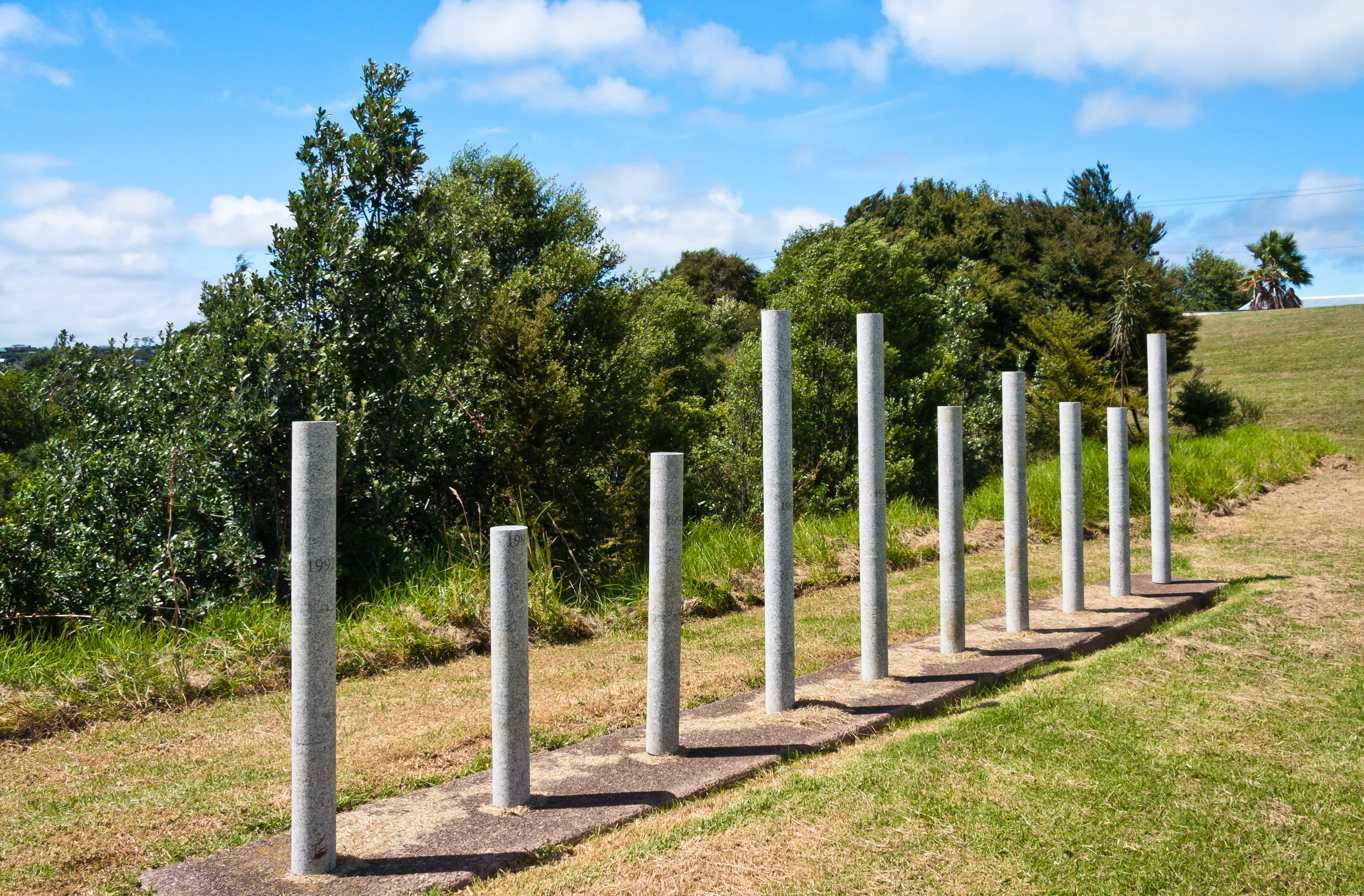
A Decade of Rain (2003), an artwork depicting Waiheke Island precipitation data from 1992 to 2002

New Zealand's Cropp River has the 4th highest rainfall in the world with a 11,499 mm per year average. The river may be only 9 km long but it certainly punches above its weight in precipitation.

== Europe ==
On an annual basis, rainfall across the continent is favored within the Alps, and from Slovenia southward to the western coast of Greece. Other maxima exist in western Georgia, northwest Iberia, western Great Britain, and western Norway. The maxima along the eastern coasts of water bodies is due to the westerly wind flow which dominates across the continent. A bulk of the precipitation across the Alps falls between March and November. The wet season in lands bordering the Mediterranean lasts from October through March, with November and December typically the wettest months. Summer rainfall across the continent evaporates completely into the warm atmosphere, leaving winter precipitation to be the source of groundwater for Europe. Mesoscale rain systems during the rainy season track south and eastward over the Mediterranean, with western portions of the sea experiencing 20 percent more rainfall than eastern sections of the sea.

The European Monsoon (more commonly known as the Return of the Westerlies) is the result of a resurgence of westerly winds from the Atlantic, where they become loaded with wind and rain. These westerly winds are a common phenomenon during the European winter, but they ease as spring approaches in late March and through April and May. The winds pick up again in June, which is why this phenomenon is also referred to as "the return of the westerlies". The rain usually arrives in two waves, at the beginning of June and again in mid to late June. The European monsoon is not a monsoon in the traditional sense in that it doesn't meet all the requirements to be classified as such. Instead the Return of the Westerlies is more regarded as a conveyor belt that delivers a series of low pressure centres to Western Europe where they create unseasonable weather. These storms generally feature significantly lower than average temperatures, fierce rain or hail, thunder and strong winds. The Return of the Westerlies affects Europe's Northern Atlantic coastline, more precisely Ireland, Great Britain, the Benelux countries, western Germany, northern France and parts of Scandinavia. There are cycles seen within the rainfall data from Northern Europe between Great Britain and Germany, which are seen at a 16-year interval. Southern Europe experiences a 22-year cycle in rainfall variation. Other smaller term cycles are seen at 10-12 year and 6-7 year periods within the rainfall record. Places with significant impact by acid rain across the continent include most of eastern Europe from Poland northward into Scandinavia.

== North America ==
=== Canada ===
Precipitation across Canada is highest in the mountain ranges in the western portions due to onshore flow bringing Pacific moisture into the mountains, which is subsequently forced to lift up their slopes and deposit significant precipitation, primarily between August and May. Mesoscale convective systems are common mid-summer near the central border with the United States from the Prairie provinces eastward towards the Great Lakes. Southeastern sections of the country are also wet, due to the development of extratropical cyclones along the east coast of the continent which move northward into Atlantic Canada. During the summer and fall months, tropical cyclones from the Atlantic basin are also possible across Atlantic Canada. Amounts decrease as one works farther inland from the Pacific and Atlantic coasts, and from south to north towards the Arctic.

=== Mexico ===
Rainfall varies widely both by location and season. Arid or semiarid conditions are encountered in the Baja California Peninsula, the northwestern state of Sonora, the northern altiplano, and also significant portions of the southern Altiplano. Rainfall in these regions averages between 300 and 600 millimeters (11.8 and 23.6 in) per year, with lower amounts across Baja California Norte. Average rainfall totals are between 600 and 1,000 millimeters (23.6 and 39.4 in) in most of the major populated areas of the southern altiplano, including Mexico City and Guadalajara. Low-lying areas along the Gulf of Mexico receive in excess of 1,000 millimeters (39.4 in) of rainfall in an average year, with the wettest region being the southeastern state of Tabasco, which typically receives approximately 2,000 millimeters (78.7 in) of rainfall on an annual basis. Parts of the northern altiplano, highlands and high peaks in the Sierra Madre Occidental and the Sierra Madre Oriental occasionally receive significant snowfalls.

Mexico has pronounced wet and dry seasons. Most of the country experiences a rainy season from June to mid-October and significantly less rain during the remainder of the year. February and July generally are the driest and wettest months, respectively. Mexico City, for example, receives an average of only 5 millimeters (0.2 in) of rain during February but more than 160 millimeters (6.3 in) in July. Coastal areas, especially those along the Gulf of Mexico, experience the largest amounts of rain in September. Tabasco typically records more than 300 millimeters (11.8 in) of rain during that month. A small coastal area of northwestern coastal Mexico around Tijuana has a Mediterranean climate with considerable coastal fog and a rainy season that occurs in winter.

Tropical cyclones track near and along the western Mexican coastline primarily between the months of July and September. These storms enhance the monsoon circulation over northwest Mexico and the southwest United States. On an average basis, eastern Pacific tropical cyclones contribute about one-third of the annual rainfall along the Mexican Riviera, and up to one-half of the rainfall seen annually across Baja California Sur. Mexico is twice as likely (18% of the basin total) to be impacted by a Pacific tropical cyclone on its west coast than an Atlantic tropical cyclone on its east coast (9% of the basin total). The three most struck states in Mexico in the 50 years at the end of the 20th century were Baja California Sur, Sinaloa, and Quintana Roo.

=== United States ===
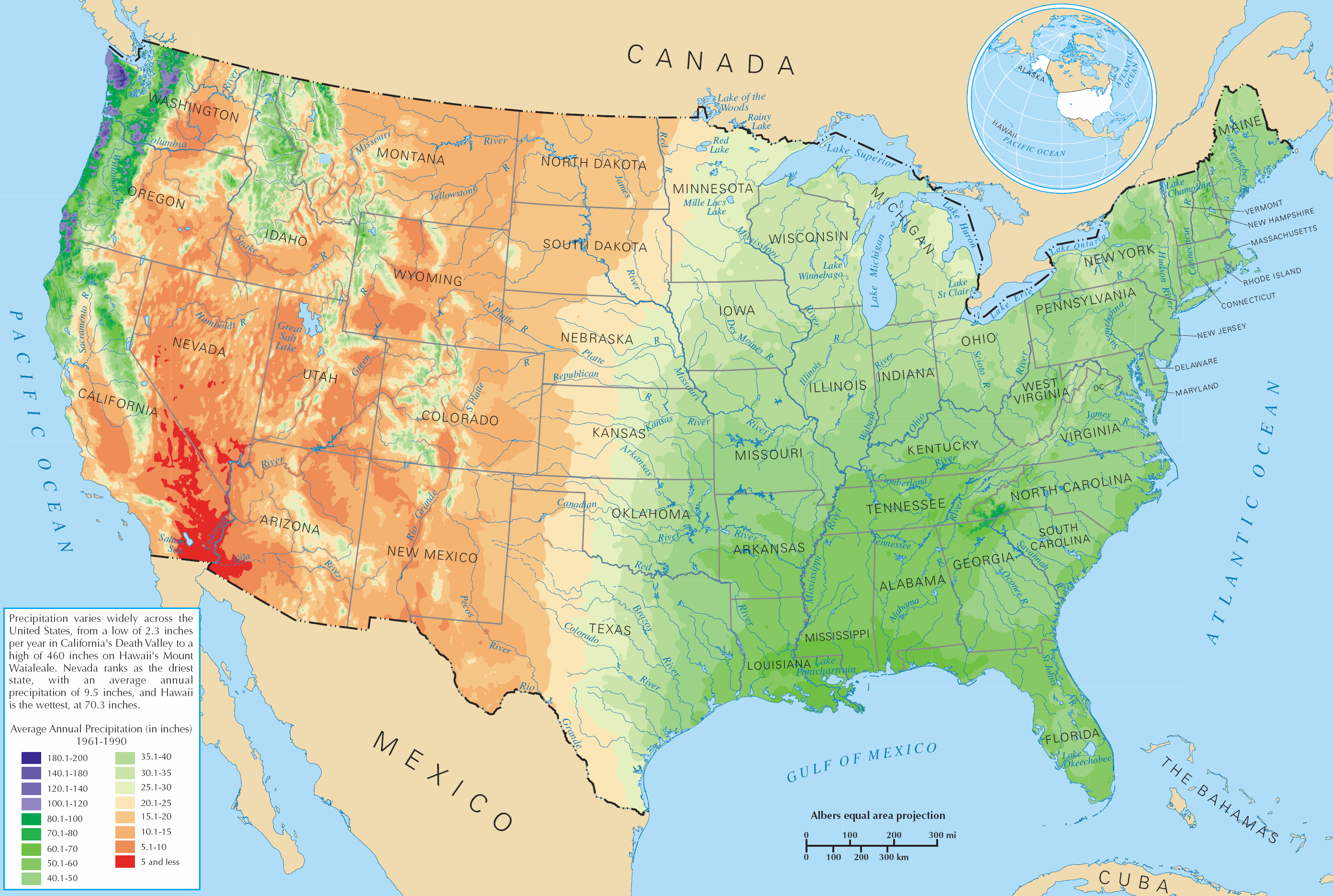
Average precipitation in the lower 48 United States

Late summer and fall extratropical cyclones bring a majority of the precipitation which falls across western, southern, and southeast Alaska annually. During the fall, winter, and spring, Pacific storm systems bring most of Hawaii and the western United States much of their precipitation.

In winter, mid latitude stroms bring precipitation to much of the eastern USA as the move from west to east. In the winter months, mid latitude storms also move up the upper East Coast from New Jersey to Maine and bring precipitation. During the summer, the Southwest monsoon combined with Gulf of California bring passing showers to the southwest desert areas. In summer, much of the southeastern USA and East Coast from NYC south to Florida see frequent thudershowers, which brings brief, but often heavy showers. Tropical cyclones also enhance precipitation across Gulf and South Atlantic states in summer and fall, as well as Puerto Rico, the United States Virgin Islands, the Northern Mariana Islands, Guam, and American Samoa. Over the top of the ridge, the jet stream brings a summer precipitation maximum to the Great Lakes. Large thunderstorm areas known as mesoscale convective complexes move through the Plains, Midwest, and Great Lakes during the warm season, contributing up to 10% of the annual precipitation to the region.

The El Niño–Southern Oscillation affects the precipitation distribution, by altering rainfall patterns across the West, Midwest, the Southeast, and throughout the tropics. There is also evidence that global warming is leading to increased precipitation to the eastern portions of North America, while droughts are becoming more frequent in the tropics and subtropics. The eastern half of the contiguous United States east of the 98th meridian, the mountains of the Pacific Northwest, and the Sierra Nevada range are the wetter portions of the nation, with average rainfall exceeding 30 inches (760 mm) per year. The drier areas are the Desert Southwest, Great Basin, valleys of northeast Arizona, eastern Utah, central Wyoming, eastern Oregon and Washington and the northeast of the Olympic Peninsula. The Big Bog on the island of Maui receives, on average, 404 inches (10,300 mm) every year, making it the wettest location in the US, and all of Oceania, apart from Cropp River in New Zealand.

== South America ==
The annual average rainfall maxima across the continent lie across the northwest from northwest Brazil into northern Peru, Colombia, and Ecuador, then along the Atlantic coast of the Guyanas and far northern Brazil, as well as within the southern half of Chile. Lloró, a town situated in Chocó, Colombia, is probably the place with the largest measured rainfall in the world, averaging 13,300 mm per year (523.6 in). In fact, the whole Department of Chocó is extraordinarily humid. Tutunendo, a small town situated in the same department, is one of the wettest places on earth, averaging 11,394 mm (448.6 in) per year; in 1974 the town received 26,303 mm (1,035.6 in), the largest annual rainfall measured in Colombia. Unlike Cherrapunji, which receives most of its rainfall between April and September, Tutunendo receives rain almost uniformly distributed throughout the year. The months of January and February have somewhat less frequent storms. On average, Tutunendo has 280 days with rainfall per year. Over two-thirds of the rain (68%) falls during the night. The average relative humidity is 90% and the average temperature is 26.4 °C. Quibdó, the capital of Chocó, receives the most rain in the world among cities with over 100,000 inhabitants: 9,000 millimetres (350 in) per year. Storms in Chocó can drop 500 mm (19.7 in) of rainfall in a day. This amount is more than falls in many cities in a year's time. The Andes mountain range blocks Pacific moisture that arrives in that continent, resulting in a desertlike climate just downwind across western Argentina.

== Urban heat island impacts ==
Aside from the effect on temperature, urban heat islands (UHIs) can produce secondary effects on local meteorology, including the altering of local wind patterns, the development of clouds and fog, the humidity, and the rates of precipitation. The extra heat provided by the UHI leads to greater upward motion, which can induce additional shower and thunderstorm activity. Rainfall rates downwind of cities are increased between 48% and 116%. Partly as a result of this warming, monthly rainfall is about 28% greater between 20 miles (32 km) to 40 miles (64 km) downwind of cities, compared with upwind. Some cities show a total precipitation increase of 51%. Using satellite images, researchers discovered that city climates have a noticeable influence on plant growing seasons up to 10 kilometers (6 mi) away from a city's edges. Growing seasons in 70 cities in eastern North America were about 15 days longer in urban areas compared to rural areas outside of a city's influence.

== See also ==
- China tropical cyclone rainfall climatology
- Mexico tropical cyclone rainfall climatology
- Typhoons in the Philippines
- United States rainfall climatology
