= Unbroken (Fiona album) =

Studio album by Fiona
- Released: October 17, 2011
- Genre: Pop rock
- Label: Life on the Moon
- Producer: James Christian

Fiona chronology
Squeeze (1992)	Unbroken (2011)

Unbroken is the fifth studio album from Fiona. After being persuaded to rejoin the ranks of the music industry (following a two decade hiatus) by producer James Christian, singer Robin Beck and guitarist Tommy Denander, Fiona released the album on October 17, 2011 via Life on the Moon Records.

== Track listing ==
1. "Loved Along the Way" 3:33
2. "Broken" 3:53
3. "I've Released You" 3:14
4. "Shadows Of The Night" 3:11
5. "Badge of Love" 4:17
6. "Wild One" 3:13
7. "This Heart" (featuring Robin Beck) 3:27
8. "Get Yer Kix" 3:23
9. "Salt On My Wings" 4:40
10. "I Love You But Shut Up" 3:17
11. "Everything You Are" 4:22

== Personnel ==
- Robin Beck
- James Christian
- Tommy Denander
- Holly Knight
- Bobby Messano
- Marc Tanner
