= The Musician's Handbook =

- First edition
- Author: Bobby Borg
- Language: English
- Genre: Music Business
- Publisher: Billboard Books - Imprint of Watson Guptill
- Publication date: 2003
- Publication place: United States
- Media type: Print (Soft Cover)
- Pages: 288
- ISBN: 9780823099702
- OCLC: 219470209
- Dewey Decimal: 780.2373
- LC Class: ML3790.B68 2008
- Preceded by: The Musician's Handbook

The Musician's Handbook is a music business book first published in 2003 by Billboard Books with the revised edition released in 2008 by Random House. Written by Bobby Borg, the book investigates the realities of the music business and is designed to help the reader understand the ins and outs of the music industry. Borg is a former member of the American rock groups Warrant, Beggars & Thieves, and Left for Dead.

The book was written with new musicians in mind in order to provide them an industry perspective. According to WorldCat, the book is held in 674 libraries.

Borg is also the author of Business Basics For Musicians Vol 1 and 2, Music Marketing For The DIY Musician Vol 1 and 2, and Introduction to Music Publishing For Musicians all published by Rowman & Littlefield. He currently teachers at USC Thornton School of Music.
