= Heart Like a Gun =

Studio album by Fiona
- Released: October 2, 1989
- Genre: Pop rock, hard rock
- Length: 41:49
- Label: Atlantic
- Producer: Beau Hill, Keith Olsen

Fiona chronology
Beyond the Pale (1986)	Heart Like a Gun (1989)	Squeeze (1992)

Professional ratings
Review scores
Source	Rating
AllMusic	4/5 stars

Heart Like a Gun is the third studio album by singer Fiona, released on October 2, 1989 through Atlantic Records. It reached #150 on the Billboard 200 chart in 1990 and remained charted for sixteen weeks. The album features singer/bassist Kip Winger and drummer Rod Morgenstein from the band Winger, with Kip dueting with Fiona on "Everything You Do (You're Sexing Me)".

== Track listing ==
No.	Title	Writer(s)	Length
1.	"Little Jeannie (Got the Look of Love)"	Fiona, Jack Griffith	3:23
2.	"Everything You Do (You're Sexing Me)"	Fiona, Beau Hill, Lance Cosgrove	4:14
3.	"Where the Cowboys Go"	Fiona, Phil Brown	4:46
4.	"Mariel"	Fiona, Mark Mangold	4:33
5.	"Draw the Line"	Fiona, Mike Slamer	3:29
6.	"Here It Comes Again"	Fiona, Martin Page	4:11
7.	"Bringing In the Beast"	Fiona, Phil Brown	4:35
8.	"Victoria Cross"	Fiona, Bob Held, Al Greenwood, Tony Rey	4:08
9.	"Look at Me Now"	Fiona, Mark Mangold, Aldo Nova	4:14
10.	"When Pink Turns to Blue"	Phil Brown, Van Stephenson, Madeleine Stowe, Giles Reaves	4:16
Total length:			41:49

== Personnel ==
- Fiona – vocals
- Kip Winger – vocals (track 2), bass
- Brad Gillis – guitar
- Rod Morgenstein – drums

Technical

- Beau Hill – engineering, mixing, production
- Keith Olsen – engineering, mixing, production
- Gordon Fordyce – mixing
- Mark Segal – engineering
- Joel Stoner – engineering
- Jeff DeMorris – engineering
- George Counnas – engineering
- Fred Kelly – engineering
- Matt Freeman – engineering
- Ted Jensen – mastering

== Charts ==
Year	Chart	Position
1990	Billboard 200	150
