= List of storms named Fran =

The name Fran was used for fourteen tropical cyclones worldwide: four in the Atlantic Ocean, nine in the Western Pacific Ocean, and one in the South Pacific Ocean.

Atlantic Ocean:

- Hurricane Fran (1973) – formed and remained out at sea.
- Tropical Storm Fran (1984) – One of the deadliest tropical cyclones in Cape Verde's history, killing 29-32 people as it formed near Cape Verde.
- Tropical Storm Fran (1990) – formed near Cape Verde; it passed between Trinidad and Venezuela, losing strength rapidly and causing no significant damage.
- Hurricane Fran (1996) – made landfall near Cape Fear, North Carolina as a Category 3, killing 26 and causing $3.2 billion in damages.

The name Fran was retired after the 1996 season, and was replaced by Fay in the 2002 season.

Western Pacific:

- Typhoon Fran (1950) (T5043)
- Typhoon Fran (1955) (T5511)
- Tropical Depression Fran (1959) (13W, Japan Meteorological Agency analyzed it as a tropical depression, not as a tropical storm.)
- Tropical Storm Fran (1962) (T6201, 02W)
- Tropical Storm Fran (1964) (T6425, 38W)
- Tropical Storm Fran (1967) (T6712, 14W, Mameng)
- Tropical Storm Fran (1970) (T7015, 16W, Norming)
- Tropical Storm Fran (1973) (T7307, 07W, Kuring)
- Typhoon Fran (1976) (T7617, 17W, Reming) – hit southwestern Japan and caused heavy flooding and wind damage.

South Pacific:

- Cyclone Fran (1992) – a powerful tropical cyclone which affected Vanuatu and New Caledonia

== See also ==
- List of storms named Frances
- List of storms named Francisco
- List of storms named Frank
