= Hearts of Fire (soundtrack) =

Soundtrack album by Bob Dylan, Rupert Everett and Fiona
- Released: October 20, 1987
- Genre: Rock
- Length: 34:45
- Label: Columbia
- Producer: Beau Hill

Professional ratings
Review scores
Source	Rating
New Musical Express	2/10

Hearts of Fire is a soundtrack to the film Hearts of Fire. Columbia released the soundtrack October 20, 1987, with the record number SC 40870. It was recorded on August 26 and 27, 1986 in London.

The album features three artists. Bob Dylan has three songs, Fiona has five songs and Rupert Everett contributes two songs.

The three Bob Dylan songs have never been released on any other commercial project or album by Dylan, making this record a sought-after purchase for some collectors. "The Usual" is a John Hiatt cover. "Night After Night" and "Had a Dream About You Baby" are originals. An alternate mix of the latter appeared on his 1988 album, Down in the Groove.

== Track listing ==
1. "Hearts of Fire" 3:45 – Fiona
2. "The Usual" (John Robert Hiatt) 3:33 – Bob Dylan
3. "I'm in It for Love" 4:01 – Fiona
4. "Tainted Love" 3:09 – Rupert Everett
5. "Hair of the Dog (That Bit You)" 3:34 – Fiona
6. "Night After Night" 2:50 – Bob Dylan
7. "In My Heart" 3:20 – Rupert Everett
8. "The Night We Spent on Earth" 4:28 – Fiona
9. "Had a Dream About You Baby" 2:36 – Bob Dylan
10. "Let the Good Times Roll" 3:30 – Fiona
