= Hearts of Fire =

1987 film by Richard Marquand

- VHS cover
- Directed by: Richard Marquand
- Written by: Scott Richardson; Joe Eszterhas
- Produced by: Doug Harris; Jennifer Miller; Iain Smith
- Starring: Bob Dylan; Rupert Everett; Fiona; Suzanne Bertish
- Cinematography: Alan Hume
- Edited by: Sean Barton
- Music by: John Barry
- Production company: Phoenix Entertainment Group
- Distributed by: Lorimar Motion Pictures
- Release date: October 9, 1987 (United Kingdom)
- Running time: 95 minutes
- Country: United States
- Language: English
- Budget: $17 million

Hearts of Fire is a 1987 American musical drama film starring Bob Dylan, Fiona and Rupert Everett. The film was essentially a vehicle for Dylan based on his success as a rock musician. It received poor reviews, a limited theatrical release, and was later written off by Dylan himself.

== Cast ==
- Fiona as Molly McGuire
- Bob Dylan as Billy Parker
- Rupert Everett as James Colt
- Richie Havens as Pepper Ward
- Julian Glover as Alfred
- Suzanne Bertish as Anne Ashton
- Larry Lamb as Jack Rosner
- Maury Chaykin as Charlie Kelso
- Lesleh Donaldson as Penny
- Jeremy Ratchford as Jim "Jimbo"
- Mark Rylance as "Fizz"
- Ian Dury as "Bones"
- Tony Rosato as Woody

== Origin and filming ==
The film was announced in London in August 1986 as Dylan's first screen appearance since 1978's Renaldo and Clara, which had been poorly received. Originally written by Scott Richardson, the screenplay was rewritten by future Basic Instinct writer Joe Eszterhas because Lorimar Productions felt that Richardson was a "baby writer" and not experienced enough to take on the responsibility of a starring vehicle for a rock icon of Dylan's stature. Hearts of Fire is also regarded as the film that "killed Richard Marquand", director of Return of the Jedi, who would die of a stroke later the same year.

The film was shot in Canada (Hamilton and Toronto) at the defunct Davenport Works of the Canadian General Electric Company and the United Kingdom (Southerndown and Coney Beach at Porthcawl). Cardiff Airport also substituted for Heathrow. The film's concert scenes were shot at the Copps Coliseum in Hamilton, Ontario, Colston Hall in Bristol, and Camden, North London.

== Release ==
Hearts of Fire was originally due for release in the United States in June 1987 by 20th Century Fox on behalf of Lorimar-Telepictures but it was delayed until November 1987. In September 1987, director Marquand died and the film was removed from Fox's schedules, although it was claimed that it wasn't due to his death. All plans to release the film nationwide were put into limbo, citing the negative reviews of the feature film. It was released in the United Kingdom on October 9, 1987 at the Odeon Marble Arch and Odeon cinemas in Brighton, Edinburgh, Liverpool and Manchester during a Dylan tour of the UK. It was pulled from the cinemas after approximately two weeks. The film was later released to very few theaters in the United States for one week only.

=== Home media ===
The film was due to be released on videocassette in the United States by Lorimar Home Entertainment in spring 1988 but was delayed following Lorimar's acquisition by Warner Bros.. It was released in the United Kingdom. It was eventually released directly to video in the United States by Warner Home Video in 1990. The film was re-released on VHS by Warner Brothers on December 6, 1993.

The film was released digitally for purchase through iTunes and Vudu.

== Reception ==
The film was received negatively by critics. Variety lamented that it was "unfortunate that the last film of [director] Richard Marquand, who died shortly after completing it, should be Hearts of Fire" and that the film failed "to fire on all cylinders despite a nimble performance by the enigmatic Bob Dylan typecast as a reclusive rock star." Channel 4 deemed the film a "blunt instrument of 80s vacuity." DVDLaser stated that it is "a really bad movie," but also that the viewer's opinion of Bob Dylan is "the key to liking or disliking the film."

Time Out London said that Dylan "hovers enigmatically on the sidelines, offering jaundiced comments."

== Soundtrack ==
In October 1987, Columbia Records released the soundtrack to the film. Dylan was apparently originally contracted to write and contribute four new original recordings to the album but only turned in two original songs and one cover song. The tracks included a cover of John Hiatt's "The Usual", along with the Dylan originals "Night After Night" and "Had a Dream About You Baby". The soundtrack album did not sell well. Dylan later released an alternate version of "Had a Dream About You Baby" on the 1988 album Down in the Groove.
