= List of storms named Frances =

The name Frances has been used for nine tropical cyclones worldwide: eight in the Atlantic Ocean and one in the Australian region.

In the Atlantic Ocean:

- Hurricane Frances (1961): Caused flooding in Puerto Rico, peaked at Category 4 west of Bermuda, subtropical at Nova Scotia
- Tropical Storm Frances (1968): Travelled across the central Atlantic Ocean without affecting land
- Hurricane Frances (1976): Curved over the central Atlantic, affected the Azores as an extratropical storm
- Hurricane Frances (1980): Travelled up the central Atlantic Ocean without affecting land
- Hurricane Frances (1986): Briefly drifted over the western Atlantic but never affected land
- Hurricane Frances (1992): Threatened Bermuda but did not strike the island, then hit Spain as an extratropical storm
- Tropical Storm Frances (1998): A weak storm that caused flooding in East Texas and southern Louisiana
- Hurricane Frances (2004): A powerful Category 4 hurricane that struck the Bahamas, and later, as a Category 2 storm, moved extremely slowly over Florida, causing billions in damage

After the 2004 season, the name Frances was retired and replaced by Fiona, which was first used during the 2010 season.

In the Australian region:

- Cyclone Frances (2017): A relatively strong tropical cyclone which remained off the coasts of Papua New Guinea, Indonesia and northern Australia.

== See also ==
- List of storms named Fran
- List of storms named Francisco
