= Bobby Messano =

American artist, guitarist and musician (born 1954)

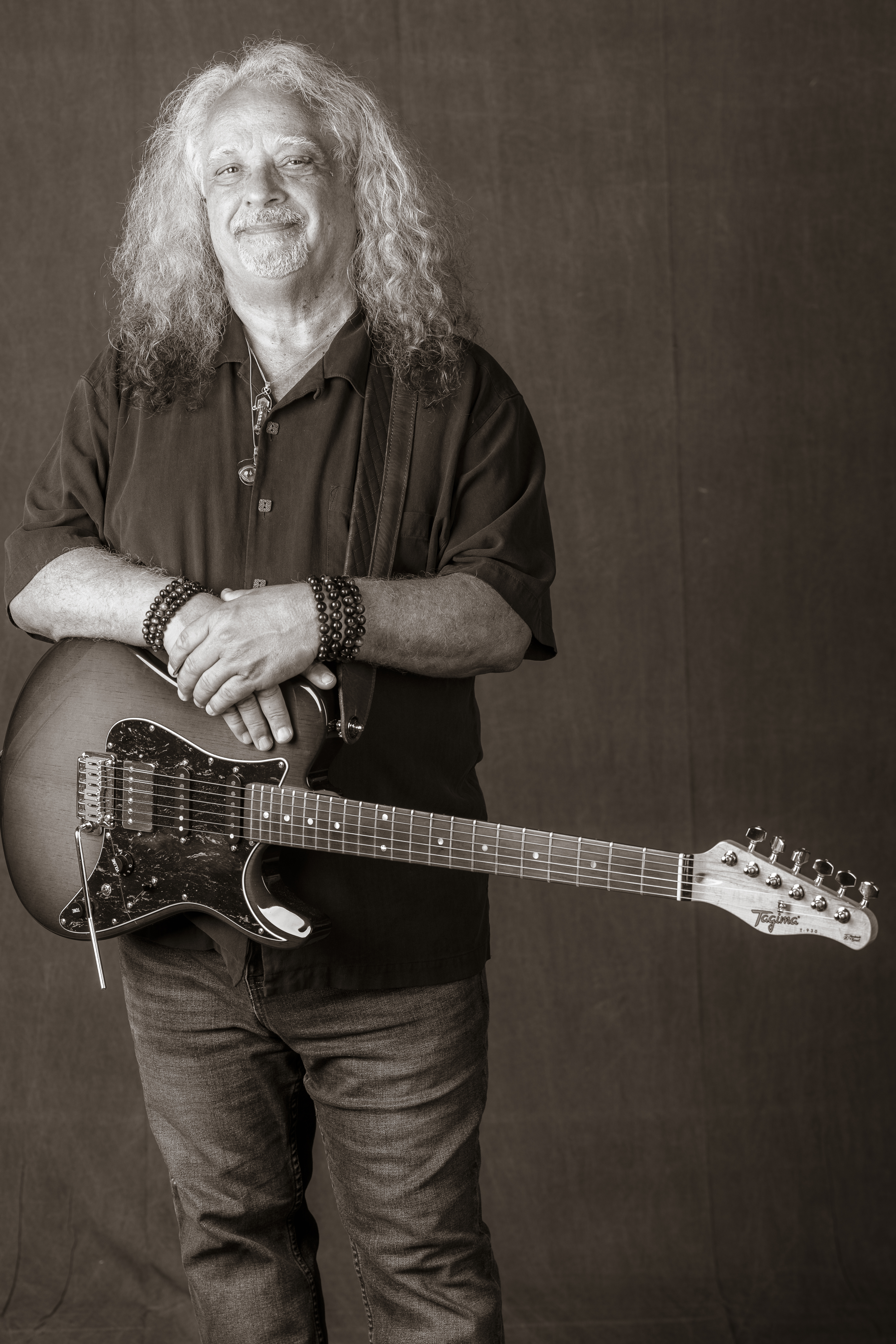

Bobby Messano (born June 23, 1954) is an American artist, guitarist and musician. He has recorded and toured with STARZ, Lou Gramm, Steve Winwood, Clarence Clemons, Franke and the Knockouts, and Peter Criss.

== Early life and education ==
Messano was born in Teaneck, New Jersey and his family lived in nearby Ridgefield Park, New Jersey until he went to Washington College in Chestertown, Maryland for Music and English.

== Career ==
In 1976, Bobby joined the band Stanky Brown who were signed to Sire Records and managed by John Scher. Stanky Brown toured with Boston, The Allman Brothers, Outlaws, and NRPS. He recorded with the band on their third and final record on Sire, called "Stanky Brown".

Messano then joined Starz who were signed to Capitol Records and Aucoin management. Starz toured for 1978-79 and released Coliseum Rock. The band toured with Ted Nugent on his Weekend Warriors Tour, Rush Hemispheres Tour, Styx and headlined shows in the U.S. Bobby then moved into session work, working with Gloria Gaynor, Peter Criss, playing on his 1982 Let Me Rock You album Michael Pare', Robey, and Benny Mardones. In 1983, Bobby was music director for Steve Winwood on his UK and European tour. He joined Franke & The Knockouts in 1984.

In 1985, Bobby started working with Joe Lynn Turner and Fiona and played on both their CD's Rescue You and Fiona. He toured with Joe Lynn Turner and played guitar on Fiona's sophomore record Beyond The Pale and her 2011 release Unbroken. He then played on Glen Burtnick's Talking in Code record and toured with him. He played guitar on Clarence Clemons Hero album and played the only guitar solo on the LP. In 1987, Messano was asked to tour on the Lou Gramm (Foreigner) "Ready or Not" tour in the U.S. and Germany. He also was putting the finishing touches on his 1989 Messano CD which was released by Strategic/Relativity in 1989. In 1990 Bobby toured Germany with Robin Beck.

Bobby Messano's first Contemporary Blues CD Dominion Roads was released on Ichiban/EMI Records in 1998. The label went bankrupt in 2002 and Messano put his material on the fledgling MP3.com. He then released Dominion Roads as the retitled Holdin' Ground in 2004 on FishHead records, followed by Bobby Messano Live in Madison in 2008 on his own Prince Frog Records label that was distributed by CD Baby. This was Bobby's first album with Geoff Wilbourn producing.

Messano was inducted into the Delaware Blues Hall of Fame in 2012 and That's Why I Don't Sing the Blues was the #1 U.S. release on the Blues Underground 2012 US Blues Rock Chart. This was Bobby's first studio album working with producer Geoff Wilbourn. Bobby continues to play live solo and band shows and continues to place songs in TV and cable shows. Even though COVID-19 slowed his touring schedule down through 2022, he is back on the road doing 75-100 shows per year.

In July/August 2015 Love and Money was in Billboard Top 10 Blues Albums, for 6 weeks, reaching #1 on August 8. The album was also Top 50 on Three other Billboard Charts.

In August 2015 Bobby Messano Love & Money was nominated for a Blues Blast Award for Rock Blues Album of the Year. This was the third album produced by Geoff Wilbourn.

On April 15, 2017 Bad Movie was released and debuted at #1 on Sirius/XM B.B. King's Bluesville and stayed in the Top 40 on the Roots Music Charts Blues Rock Album Chart for 10 months.

On November 16, 2017, Bobby's "Bad Movie" song won a Hollywood Music in Media Award (HMMA) for Best Blues Album.

In October 2018 Bobby played his first headlining solo tour in Europe, doing shows in Holland and Belgium.

Lemonade was released July 12, 2019 on Fish Head/Warner Brothers Records and garnered rave reviews and airplay.

In September 2022 Bobby returned to Belgium for a successful week long tour.

The Songs I Never Sang was released on January 29, 2021. It is a collection of Bobby's favorite cover songs done during the COVID pandemic in his home studio.

"Music & Other Sundries" Bobby's tenth solo project and his first vinyl album was released on April 15, 2022, and received 3 Grammy First Round Ballots. Produced by Geoff Wilbourn and recorded at Sound Emporium Studios.

Eight songs of Bobby's including "WHY YOU LOOKING BACK remain in constant rotation on XM/Sirius BB King's Bluesville

Every release of Bobby's since Holding Ground in 2002 has received multiple Grammy First Round ballots. As of October 2023, the total is 59 times in 9 different categories.

Bobby’s song “ON THE FIRING LINE” from his 1989 Rock album MESSANO was featured in the HULU/DISNEY+ hit show, “WELCOME TO CHIPPENDALE’S”

ON FEBRUARY 2, 2024 MUSIC AND OTHER SUNDRIES was the winner of the "BEST AMERICANA ALBUM" AT THE WORLD ENTERTAINMENT AWARDS IN LOS ANGELES, CALIFORNIA.

ACOUSTIC TRANSITIONS VOLUME 1 was released by Autumn Records on 8/13/2024 It is his ELEVENTH solo album. The song KEY TO THE HIGHWAY was on heavy rotation on Sirius/XM BB King's Bluesville for many months.

In September of 2024 Bobby's song "IN THE DEPTHS OF LOVE" won the Unsigned Only Song Competition for BEST BLUES SONG.

Bobby played festivals and shows in Thailand and Jamaica in January and February of 2025.

In May of 2025 Bobby's song "IN THE DEPTHS OF LOVE" won an Honorable Mention in the International Song Competition for BEST BLUES SONG.

Still~Life, Bobby’s twelfth solo album was released on July 18th 2025 with heavy airplay on the first single “JUMP”. and has already won the two World Music Awards for Best Blues Album and Best Blues Song.The album was produced by Geoff Wilbourn and the first record out of his Autumn Records Studio in Belleville, Wisconsin

== Solo Discography ==
- Messano 1989
- Dominion Roads 1998 (as "Bobby Messano & NBO")
- Holdin' Ground 2003
- Live in Madison, 2010.
- That's Why I Don't Sing the Blues, 2011
- Welcome to Deltaville, 2013
- Love and Money, 2015
- Bad Movie 2017
- Messano Re-Release (Deluxe Edition) 2019
- Holdin' Ground Re-Release 2019
- Lemonade 2019
- The Songs I Never Sang 2021
- Music & Other Sundries 2022
- Acoustic Transitions Volume 1 2024
- Still Life 2025
