= Mexico tropical cyclone rainfall climatology =

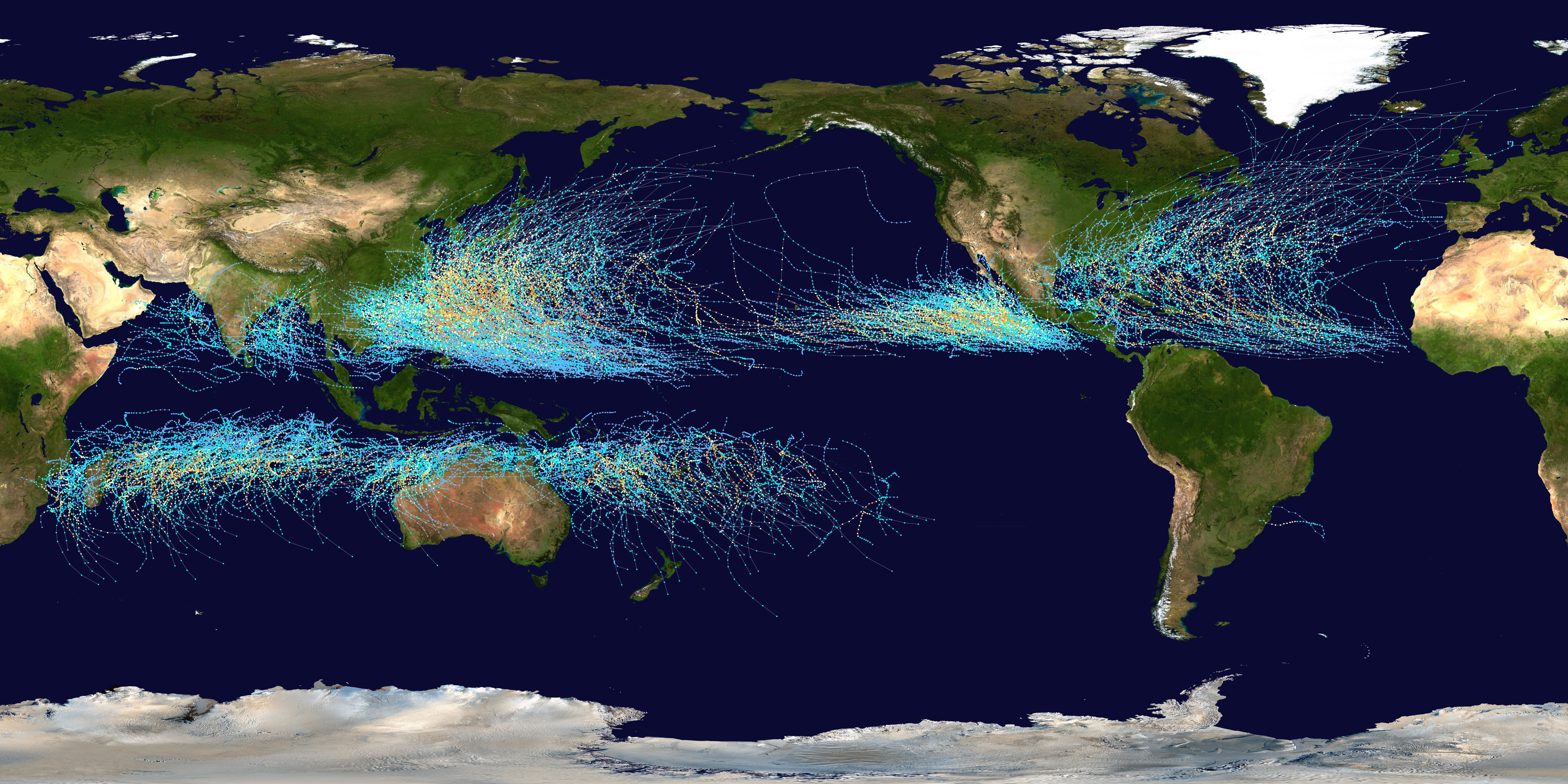
All tropical cyclone tracks between the years 1985 and 2005.

Mexico tropical cyclone rainfall climatology discusses precipitation characteristics of tropical cyclones that have struck Mexico over the years. One-third of the annual rainfall received along the Mexican Riviera and up to half of the rainfall received in Baja California Sur is directly attributable to tropical cyclones moving up the west coast of Mexico. The central plateau is shielded from the high rainfall amounts seen on the oceanward slopes of the Sierra Madre Oriental and Occidental mountain chains.

== General characteristics ==
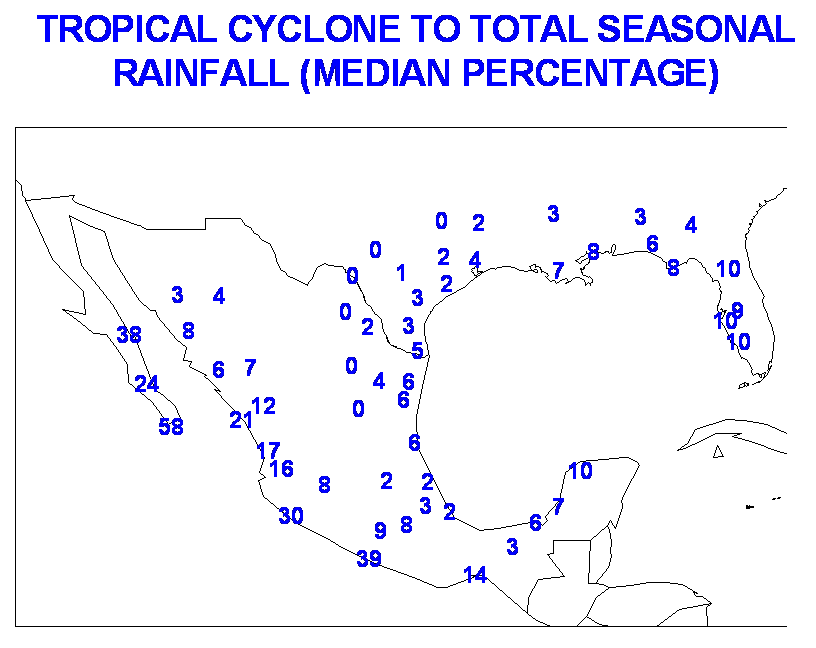
Percent of annual rainfall contributed by tropical cyclones from the eastern Pacific Ocean.

Storms track near and along the western Mexican coastline primarily between the months of July and September. These storms enhance the monsoon circulation over northwest Mexico and the southwest United States. On an average basis, eastern Pacific tropical cyclones contribute about one-third of the annual rainfall along the Mexican Riviera, and up to one-half of the rainfall seen annually across Baja California Sur. Mexico is twice as likely (18% of the basin total) to be impacted by a Pacific tropical cyclone on its west coast than an Atlantic tropical cyclone on its east coast (9% of the basin total). The three most struck states in Mexico in the 50 years at the end of the 20th century were Baja California Sur, Sinaloa, and Quintana Roo.

== Highest known rainfall amounts ==
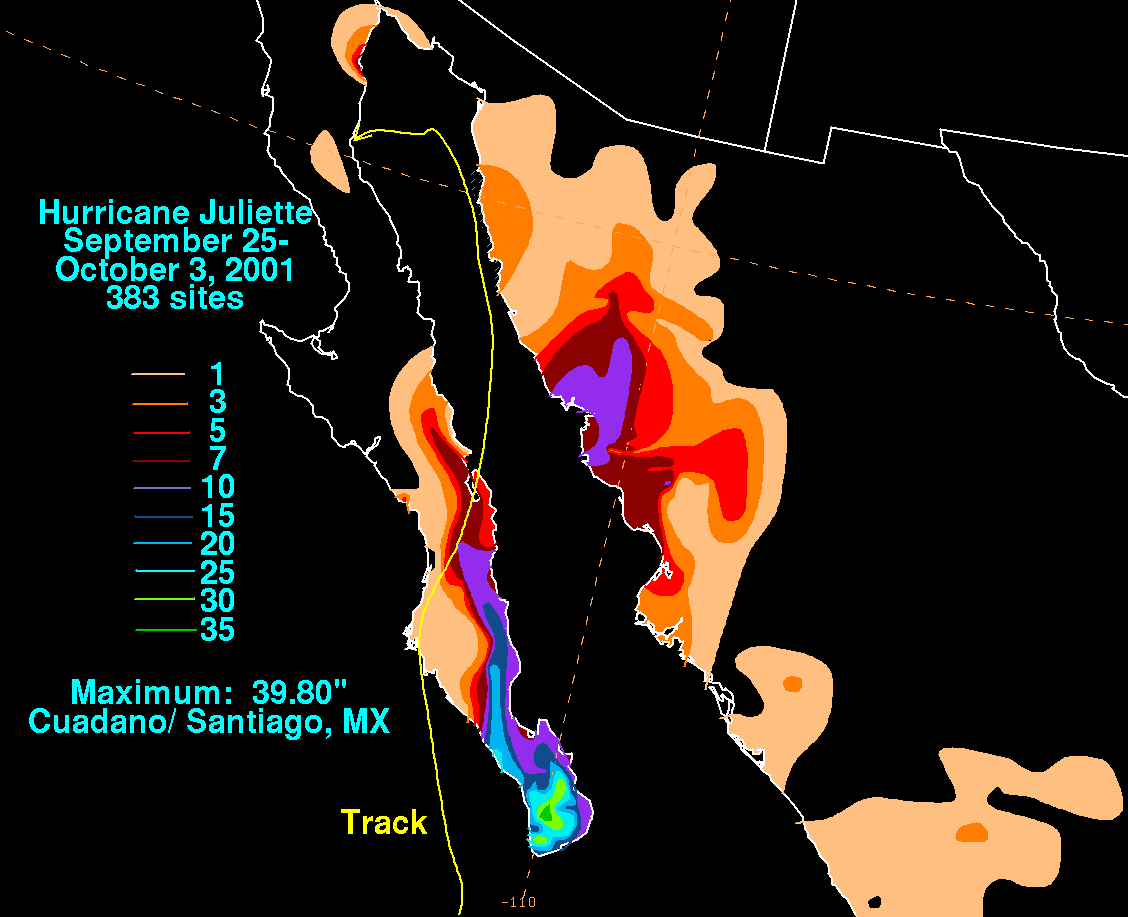
Juliette (2001) Rainfall Distribution

Below is a list of the top ten highest known storm total rainfall amounts from individual tropical cyclones across Mexico. Most of the rainfall information was provided by the Mexico's National Weather Service, Servicio Meteorológico Nacional, which is a part of the National Water Commission, Comisión Nacional del Agua.

Wettest tropical cyclones and their remnants Mexico (Overall) Highest-known totals
Precipitation			Storm	Location	Ref.
Rank	mm	in	Storm	Location	Ref.
1	1576	62.05	Wilma 2005	Quintana Roo	
2	1442	56.8	John 2024	Guerrero	
3	1119	44.06	Frances 1998	Escuintla	
4	1098	43.23	TD 11 (1999)	Jalacingo	
5	1011	39.80	Juliette 2001	Cuadano/Santiago	
6	950	37.41	Dolly 1996	Igualapa	
7	941	37.06	Fifi–Orlene 1974	Tlanchinol	
8	890	35.04	Alex 2010	Monterrey	
9	805	31.69	Gert 1993	Aquismón	
10	791	31.15	Hermine 1980	San Pedro Tapanatepec	

== Maximum tropical cyclone rainfall per state for Mexico ==
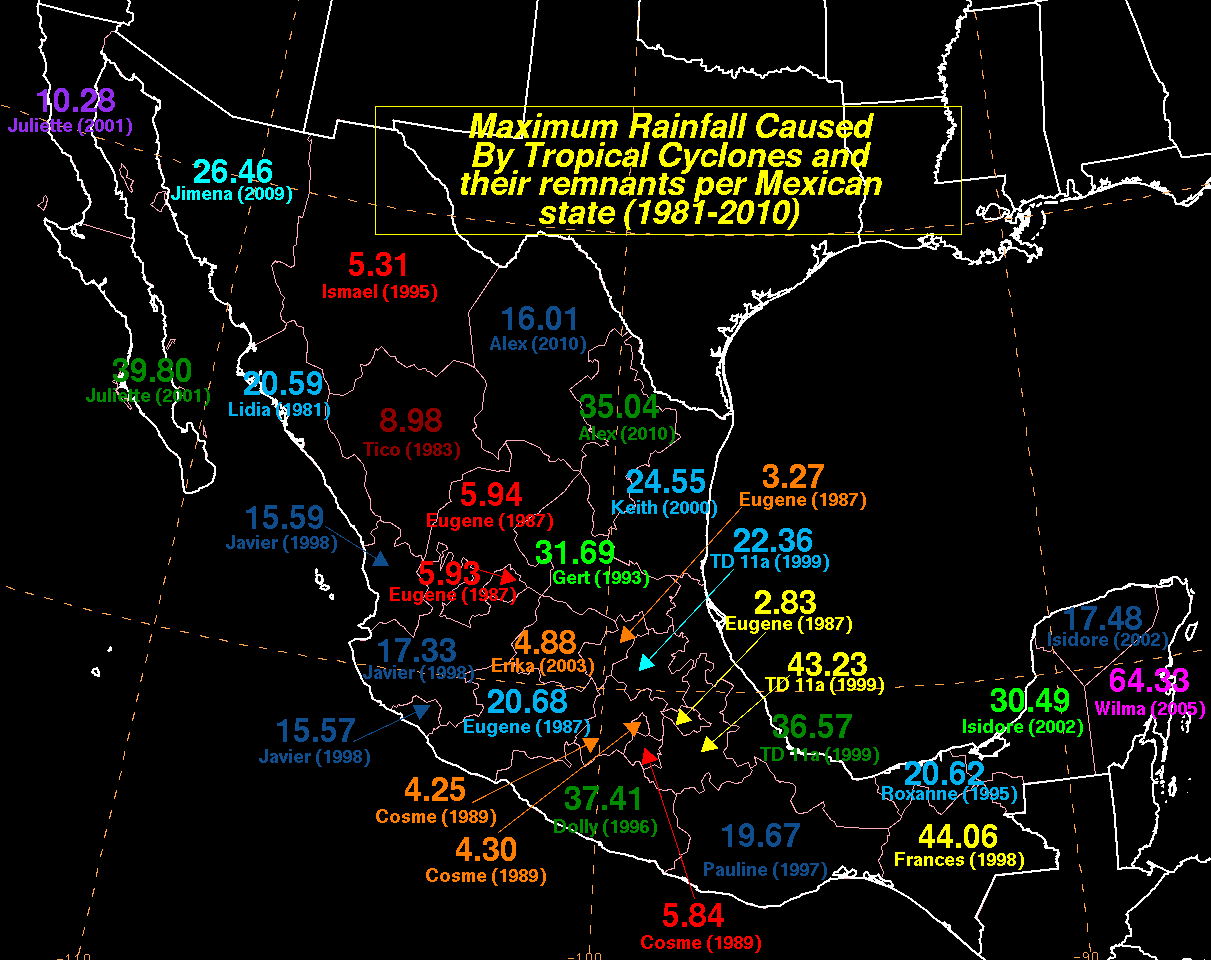
Mexico tropical cyclone rainfall maxima per state

On the western side of Mexico, the Sierra Madre Occidental keeps the central plateau free of excessive rainfall, as tropical cyclones originating in the Eastern Pacific Ocean rain themselves out on the upslope sides of the topography. On the eastern side of Mexico, the Sierra Madre Oriental has the same orographic effect, this time blocking tropical disturbances making landfall from the Gulf of Mexico. State maxima relating to tropical cyclones and their remnants are shown on the right, color-coded by amount.

State	Rainfall (mm)	Rainfall (in)	Storm (Year)
Aguascalientes	150.6	5.93	Eugene (1987)
Baja California	261.1	10.28	Juliette (2001)
Baja California Sur	1,010.9	39.80	Juliette (2001)
Campeche	774.4	30.49	Isidore (2002)
Chiapas	1,119.1	44.06	Frances (1998)
Chihuahua	134.9	5.31	Ismael (1995)
Coahuila	406.4	16.01	Alex (2010)
Colima	395.5	15.57	Javier (1998)
Distrito Federal	109.2	4.30	Cosme (1989)
Durango	228.1	8.98	Tico (1983)
Guanajuato	124.0	4.88	Erika (2003)
Guerrero	950.2	37.41	Dolly (1996)
Hidalgo	567.9	22.36	TD 11 (1999)
Jalisco	440.2	17.33	Javier (1998)
México	108.0	4.25	Cosme (1989)
Michoacán	525.3	20.68	Eugene (1987)
Morelos	148.3	5.84	Cosme (1989)
Nayarit	396.0	15.59	Javier (1998)
Nuevo León	890.0	35.04	Alex (2010)
Oaxaca	499.6	19.67	Pauline (1997)
Puebla	1098.0	43.23	TD 11 (1999)
Querétaro	83.1	3.27	Eugene (1987)
Quintana Roo	1576.1	62.05	Wilma (2005)
San Luis Potosí	804.9	31.69	Gert (1993)
Sinaloa	304.0	11.97	Isis (1998)
Sonora	672.0	26.46	Jimena (2009)
Tabasco	523.7	20.62	Roxanne (1995)
Tamaulipas	623.6	24.55	Keith (2000)
Tlaxcala	71.9	2.83	Eugene (1987)
Veracruz	928.9	36.57	TD 11 (1999)
Yucatán	444.0	17.48	Isidore (2002)
Zacatecas	355.6	14.00	Alex (2010)

== See also ==
- List of wettest tropical cyclones by country
- Tropical cyclone
- Tropical cyclone rainfall climatology
- Tropical cyclone rainfall forecasting
