= Beyond the Pale (Fiona album) =

Studio album by Fiona
- Released: 1986
- Genre: Pop rock; hard rock
- Length: 39:49
- Label: Atlantic
- Producer: Beau Hill

Fiona chronology
Fiona (1985)	Beyond the Pale (1986)	Heart Like a Gun (1989)

Singles from Beyond the Pale
- 1. "Living in a Boy's World" Released: 1986; 2. "Hopelessly Love You" Released: 1986

Beyond the Pale is the second studio album by American rock singer and actress Fiona. It was originally released in 1986 through Atlantic Records on vinyl and cassette only; a CD edition was reissued in 2004 through Wounded Bird Records, followed by a remaster in 2014 through Rock Candy Records.

== Critical reception ==
Professional ratings
Review scores
Source	Rating
AllMusic	2.5/5 stars

In a retrospective review for AllMusic, critic Andrew Hamlin awarded Beyond the Pale 2.5 stars out of 5, describing it as "'80s pop, [with] gated drums, and synthesizer stabs punctuated with '80s metal guitar."

== Track listing ==
Side one
No.	Title	Writer(s)	Length
1.	"Tragedy"	Donnie Kisselbach; Fiona Flanagan; Beau Hill; Marty Druckman; Kip Winger	4:15
2.	"Hopelessly Love You"	Michael Stewart; Dan Williams	4:22
3.	"Living in a Boy's World"	Ina Wolf; Peter Wolf	3:40
4.	"Thunder & Lightning"	Chi Coltrane	3:41
5.	"Tender Is the Heart"	Simon Climie; Billy Steinberg	3:37

Side two
No.	Title	Writer(s)	Length
6.	"Running Out of Night"	Marc Blatte; Flanagan; Bob Halligan Jr.	3:54
7.	"In My Blood"	Hill; Sandy Stewart; Winger	4:10
8.	"He's on My Side"	Ernie Gold; Flanagan	4:30
9.	"You Better Wait"	James House; Rick Neigher	3:37
10.	"Keeper of the Flame"	Flanagan; Kisselbach	4:03
Total length:			39:49

== Personnel ==
Credits are adapted from the Beyond the Pale liner notes.

- Fiona – lead vocals
- Bobby Messano – guitar (tracks 1, 9, 10)
- Mike Slamer – guitar (tracks 2, 3, 5–9)
- Reb Beach – guitar (tracks 2–4, 7, 10)
- Nile Rodgers – guitar (track 2)
- Beau Hill – keyboards; keyboard bass; drum programming (track 3); percussion (tracks 1, 3, 8); horn programming; horn arrangement; backing vocals (tracks 1, 2, 5, 6, 9); producer
- Benjy King – keyboard (track 10)
- Joe Franco – drums (tracks 1, 3, 4, 6, 8–10)
- David Rosenberg – drums (tracks 2, 5, 7); drum programming (tracks 3, 10); percussion (tracks 3, 8, 10)
- Donnie Kisselbach – bass
- Harlem Katzenjammer Horns – horns
- Kip Winger – backing vocals (tracks 1, 4, 7, 9)
- Stephen Benben – backing vocals (track 1); engineering
- Louis Merlino – backing vocals (tracks 4–6)
- Sandy Stewart – backing vocals (track 7)
- Ted Jensen – mastering
