= List of storms named Fiona =

The name Fiona has been used for seven tropical cyclones: three in the Atlantic Ocean, three in the Australian region, and one in the South-West Indian Ocean.

In the Atlantic, where Fiona replaced Frances on the naming lists:

- Tropical Storm Fiona (2010) – remnants passed near Bermuda
- Tropical Storm Fiona (2016) – did not affect land
- Hurricane Fiona (2022) – a Category 4 hurricane that affected Guadeloupe, Puerto Rico, and Atlantic Canada, becoming the strongest post-tropical cyclone to make landfall in Canada

The name Fiona was retired after the 2022 season, being replaced with Farrah for the 2028 season.

In the Australian region:

- Cyclone Fiona (1971) – a Category 3 severe tropical cyclone
- Cyclone Fiona-Gwenda (1974) – a Category 2 tropical cyclone that was operationally considered two different storms
- Cyclone Fiona (2003) – a Category 4 severe tropical cyclone whose remnants caused more precipitation in Adelaide than the city received in 2001 and 2002 combined

In the South-West Indian:

- Tropical Depression Fiona (1998)

== See also ==
- Hurricane Iona (2025) – a Central Pacific Ocean hurricane with a similar name
