= Squeeze (Fiona album) =

Studio album by Fiona
- Released: 1992
- Genre: Hard rock
- Length: 38:12
- Label: Geffen
- Producer: Marc Tanner

Fiona chronology
Heart Like a Gun (1989)	Squeeze (1992)	Unbroken (2011)

Professional ratings
Review scores
Source	Rating
AllMusic	3/5 stars

Squeeze is the fourth studio album by singer Fiona, released in 1992 through Geffen Records.

== Track listing ==
No.	Title	Writer(s)	Length
1.	"Kiss the Boys Goodbye"	Harry Paress, Curt Cuomo	3:45
2.	"Ain't That Just Like Love"	Fiona Flanagan, Jeff Neill, Marc Tanner	3:17
3.	"Treat Me Right"	Flanagan, Tanner, Mark Gable	3:41
4.	"All Over Now"	Flanagan, Tanner	3:43
5.	"The Best Is Yet to Come"	Paress, Cuomo	3:38
6.	"Squeeze"	Mikal Reid, Robin Hild	4:13
7.	"Don't Come Cryin'"	Diane Warren	4:08
8.	"Nobody Dies of a Broken Heart"	Bob Mitchell	3:56
9.	"Mystery of Love"	Tanner, Jeff Klaven, Rick Nielsen, Robin Zander	3:55
10.	"Life on the Moon"	Jani Lane	3:56
Total length:			38:12

== Personnel ==
- Fiona – lead vocals
- Dave Marshall – guitar, backing vocals
- Tommy Girvin – guitar
- Craig Stull – steel guitar
- Kim Bullard – keyboard
- Jimmy DeGrasso – drums, percussion, backing vocals
- Laura McDonald – bass, backing vocals
- Robert O. Ragland – strings arrangement, conducting
- Scott Douglas MacLachlan, Don Dokken, Joey Tempest – backing vocals

Technical

- David Thoener – engineering, mixing
- Paul Winger – engineering
- Scott Ralston – engineering
- Dale Kawashima – engineering
- Marty Horenburg – engineering
- Phil Kaffel – engineering
- Dan Hersch – mastering
- David Donnelly – mastering
- Marc Tanner – production
- Guy Roche – production (track 7)
- Richie Zito – production (track 7)
