= Tropical Storm Frances (1998) =

Atlantic tropical storm in 1998

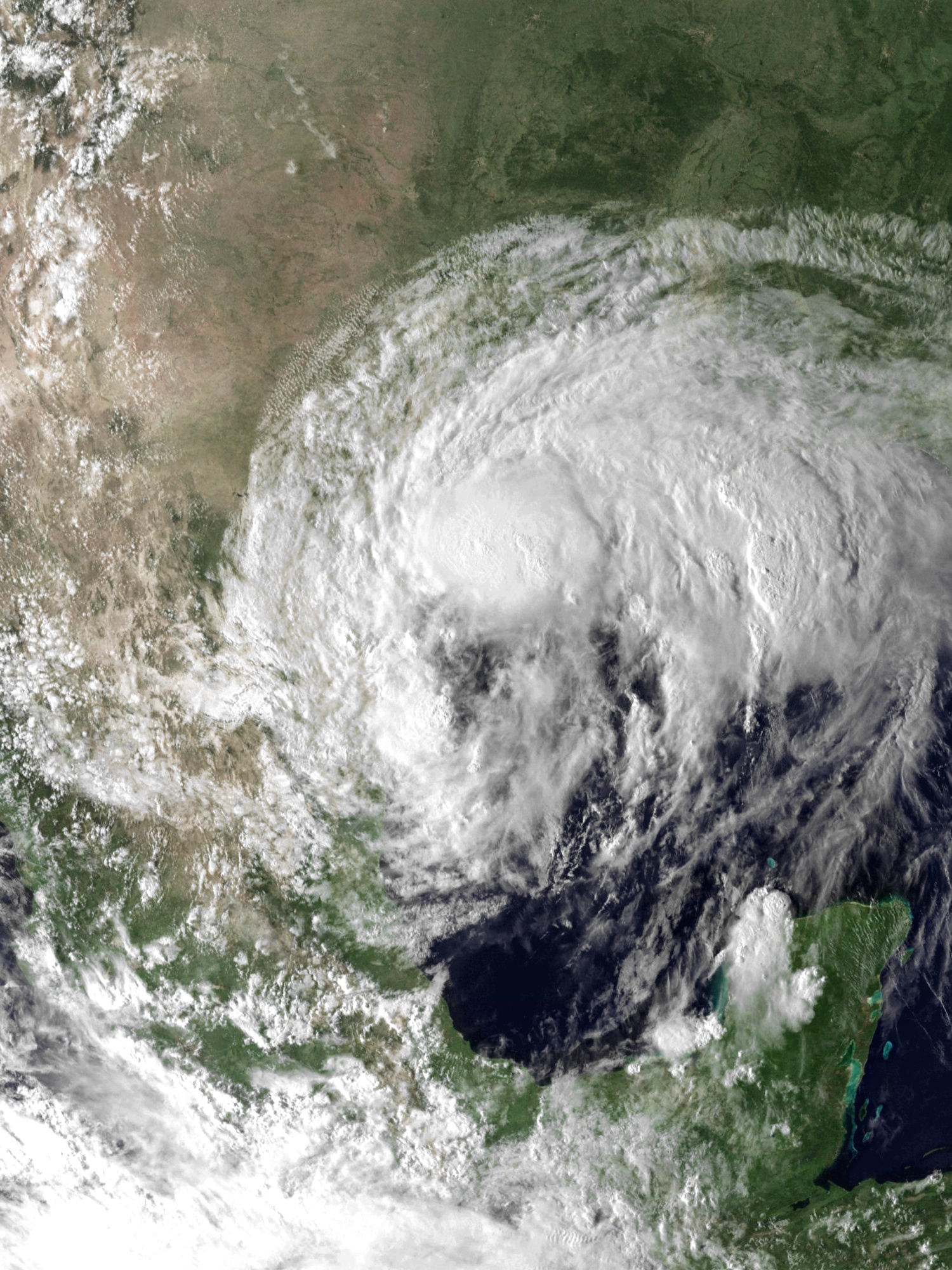
- Tropical Storm Frances near peak intensity off the coast of Texas on September 10

Meteorological history
- Formed: September 8, 1998
- Dissipated: September 13, 1998

Tropical storm
- 1-minute sustained (SSHWS/NWS)
- Highest winds: 65 mph (100 km/h)
- Lowest pressure: 990 mbar (hPa); 29.23 inHg

Overall effects
- Fatalities: 1 direct, 1 indirect
- Damage: $500 million (1998 USD)
- Areas affected: Texas, western Louisiana, Midwestern United States
- IBTrACS
- Part of the 1998 Atlantic hurricane season

Tropical Storm Frances caused extensive flooding in Mexico and Texas in September 1998. The sixth tropical cyclone and sixth named storm of the annual hurricane season, Frances developed from a low pressure area in the Gulf of Mexico on September 8. The cyclone moved northward through the western Gulf of Mexico, making landfall across the central Texas coastline before recurving across the Midwest through southeast Canada and New England. A large tropical cyclone for the Atlantic basin, yet an average sized system by western Pacific standards, the storm produced heavy rains across the Isthmus of Tehuantepec, Texas, western Louisiana and the Great Plains.

The interaction between developing Frances and Pacific Tropical Storm Javier produced torrential rainfall in southeastern Mexico, causing flooding that killed over 200 people and caused $63 million in damage. Coastal flooding overran the coasts of Louisiana and Texas, which worsened river flooding across the region. Federal disaster declarations were made for the states of Louisiana and Texas on September 23 for damage relating to this tropical cyclone. Damage totaled US$500 million (1998 dollars), mainly from flooding. There was one direct death and one indirect death associated with the tropical storm. Frances was the second tropical cyclone to hit Texas during the 1998 season, with Charley being the other.

== Meteorological history ==
Map plotting the storm's track and intensity, according to the Saffir–Simpson scale Map key Saffir–Simpson scale Tropical depression (≤38 mph, ≤62 km/h) Tropical storm (39–73 mph, 63–118 km/h) Category 1 (74–95 mph, 119–153 km/h) Category 2 (96–110 mph, 154–177 km/h) Category 3 (111–129 mph, 178–208 km/h) Category 4 (130–156 mph, 209–251 km/h) Category 5 (≥157 mph, ≥252 km/h) Unknown Storm type Tropical cyclone Subtropical cyclone Extratropical cyclone, remnant low, tropical disturbance, or monsoon depression

Before the storm formed, sea surface temperatures were above normal in the Bay of Campeche and tropical eastern Pacific Ocean. After Hurricane Earl developed and moved away from the region, a broad area of low pressure formed in the southwest Caribbean on September 4. It moved to the northwest and slowly organized in the Gulf of Mexico, although a series of tropical waves prevented rapid development. By September 8, there was a large area of convection located over the western Gulf of Mexico. That day, the system developed into Tropical Depression Six while 160 miles (260 km) east-southeast of Brownsville, Texas. Initially, the depression was large, without a well-defined center of circulation. It more resembled a monsoon depression commonly seen in the Western Pacific Ocean and the Northern Indian Ocean. The depression drifted southward and strengthened into Tropical Storm Frances on September 9.

Frances turned to the northwest and strengthened with warm water temperatures of 30 °C (86 °F), weak vertical shear, and a large anticyclone aloft. Just before making landfall on Corpus Christi, Texas, the storm reached a peak of 65 mph (105 km/h), and quickly weakened as it continued inland. Shortly after landfall, the storm executed a small loop before turning to the north and dissipating as a tropical cyclone on September 13. The remnant low of Frances persisted another day, becoming a frontal wave over Iowa. This frontal wave moved across the Great Lakes and New England into the north Atlantic by the 16th.

== Preparations ==
A tropical storm warning was issued for the Texas coast between High Island and Brownsville on the afternoon of the 8th. The next afternoon, the warning area was extended southward into northeast Mexico to Tampico. By the afternoon of the 10th, strong winds along the Louisiana coast led to an extension of the tropical storm warning eastward to the Pearl River. On the 11th, as Frances moved inland, tropical storm warnings were slowly lifted.

== Impact ==
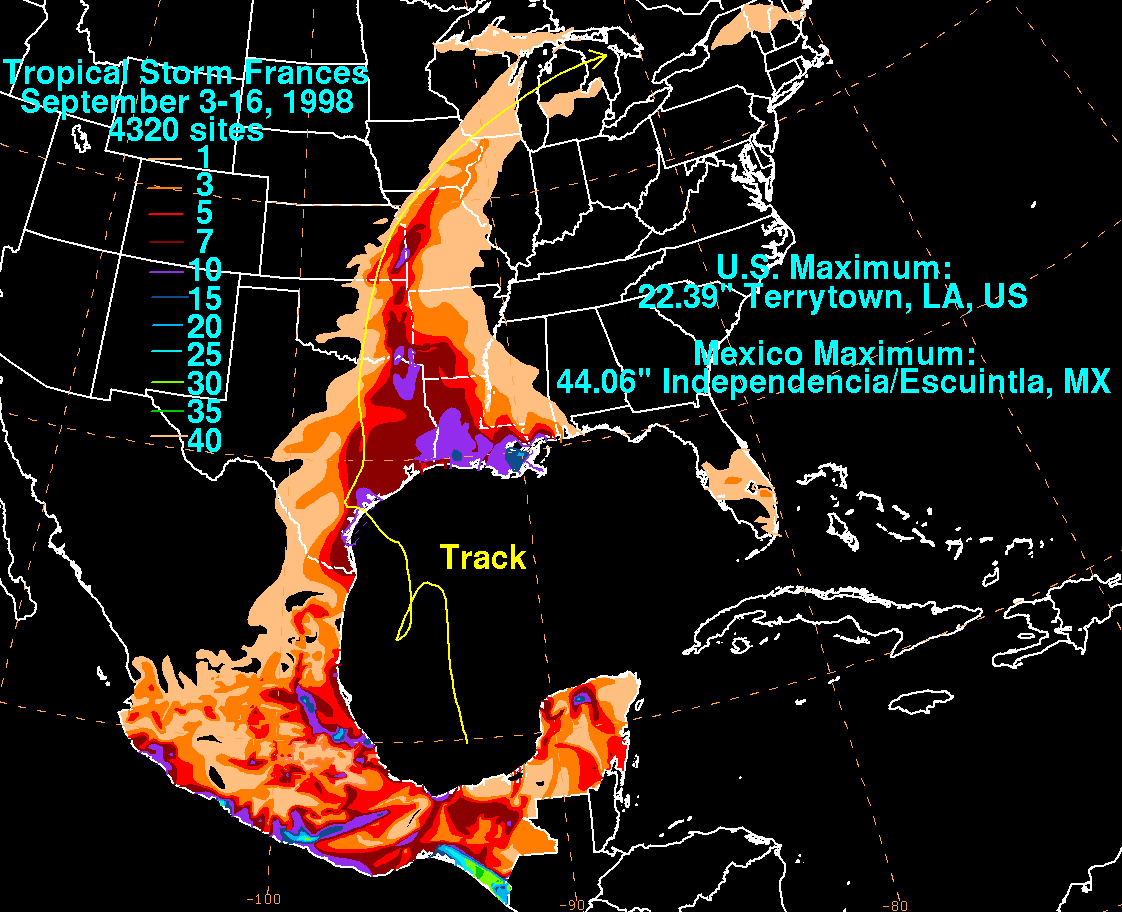
Frances rainfall across Mexico and the United States

Federal disaster declarations were made for the states of Louisiana and Texas on September 23 for damage relating to this tropical cyclone. Although there was little wind damage, Frances caused $500 million (1998 USD) in damage, mostly from flooding. In addition, it killed one person. Several counties in Texas and Louisiana were declared disaster areas.

=== Mexico ===
Simultaneous to Frances's development, Tropical Storm Javier was located to the west of Mexico in the Pacific, although its moisture produced an area of thunderstorms that extended to the east toward southeastern Mexico. The interaction between the depression that became Frances and Javier produced three days of heavy rainfall along the Sierra Madre de Chiapas. On September 6, a station named Guadalupe Victoria recorded 15.79 in (401 mm) of rainfall. The highest rainfall total in the country was 44.06 in (1,119 mm) at Escuintla, Chiapas. In the period from 1981 to 2010, this was the highest rainfall total in Chiapas related to a tropical cyclone.

About one-third of the population of Chiapas, or about 800,000 people, was directly affected by the flooding, most significantly in Motozintla and Pijijiapan. In Motozintla, near Mexico's border with Chiapas, a two-day rainfall total of 12 in (305 mm) produced flash floods and mudslides. The rainfall total represented about 36% of the town's average annual precipitation. About 600 homes were destroyed in the town alone, and there were 30 fatalities. The rains caused 36 river basins to exceed their banks. Following the floods, officials in Motozintla created a channel to divert flooding. Throughout Chiapas, the floods damaged or destroyed 40 bridges, and there was damage to Mexican Federal Highway 200 along the Pacific coast; this interrupted travel for several weeks. About 16,000 houses were damaged, forcing about 25,000 people in government shelters. The floods affected 51,159 ha (126,420 acres) of croplands. Overall, damage was estimated at $63 million (1998 USD), representing Mexico's worst natural disaster since the 1985 Mexico City earthquake. Along Sierra Madre de Chiapas, the disaster was considered a 1 in 50 year event. There were at least 229 deaths, although a government report on the flooding indicated there were over 1000 people killed or missing. After the storm, the Mexican government established a study to determine the cause and the impact of the flooding.

=== Louisiana ===
Though on the outskirts of the storm, Tropical Storm Frances dropped 10 to 15 inches (250 to 380 mm) of rain across southwest Louisiana, and over 23 inches (580 mm) of rainfall near New Orleans, Louisiana. This rainfall helped relieve drought conditions. Along the coast, the system caused a storm surge of 5.1 feet (1.6 m) in Cameron, the worst experienced along the coast of southwest Louisiana since Hurricane Carla. The storm surge swept away five houses, destroyed a fishing pier, and submerged Grand Isle. A tornado in the outer bands of the storm killed one person in Lafourche Parish, while six others were injured. At least eight tornadoes were witnessed statewide, with seven touching down across Acadiana. In addition, the storm caused an indirect death in the New Orleans area in an automobile accident. m Also, two Pacific Coast League Playoff games involving the 1998 Triple A baseball champion New Orleans Zephyrs were cancelled due to the rain from Francis, and a third almost got called off, but thanks to the assistance from Zephyr Field ground crews and the Panther Helicopters, the Third game went on as planned, and the Zephyrs won 2–1, Sending them to the Pacific coast League Championship series. This was the first tropical system the Zephyrs had to reschedule or cancel games with that season, As the 5th and Deciding game of the Pacific coast league title series was moved into the Afternoon due to Hurricane Georges.

Frances making landfall on September 11

=== Texas ===
Winds gusted as high as 66 miles per hour (106 km/h) at Sea Rim State Park as Frances lashed the coast. The lowest pressure reported from a land station was 29.33 inches of mercury (993 hPa) at Rockport, Texas. Three tornadoes touched down across the Lone Star State, at Caney Creek, La Porte, and Galveston. A major disaster declaration was issued for Brazoria, Galveston, and Harris counties.

Tropical Storm Frances caused significant amounts of flooding across southeastern Texas, with a peak of 21.46 inches (545 mm) in Houston, Texas metropolitan area. Severe flooding was also reported in Harris County and Houston. More than 1,400 homes and businesses in and around Houston were either damaged or destroyed by the floods. In addition, three main highways in Houston were washed out, leaving many motorists stranded.

Sections of the Middle Texas coast, closer to the point of landfall, and the Golden Triangle of southeast Texas reported over 10 inches (250 mm) of rainfall as well, resulting in significant flood damage. Roads and bridges were submerged near Corpus Christi. Flooding was also reported along the San Bernard River where several roads and a subdivision was flooded. The flooding also disrupted barge traffic at the Phillips Petroleum facility.

Coastal flooding occurred well in advance of the cyclone's landfall. A storm surge of 5.4 feet (1.6 m) was measured at Sabine Pass, Texas and 8 feet (2.4 m) was measured at the Matagorda Locks. Meacom's pier and San Luis Pass pier were severely damaged. Coastal flooding worsened backwater flooding in area rivers since their waters were blocked from flowing southeast into the Gulf of Mexico. Sabine Pass was cut off from the mainland for a week, until Hermine's passage to the east eased coastal flooding conditions.

== See also ==
- Other storms of the same name
- List of wettest tropical cyclones in the United States
- Tropical Storm Hermine (2010)
- Tropical Storm Beta (2020)
