= Fiona (album) =

Studio album by Fiona
- Released: February 12, 1985
- Studio: Wizard Recording (Briarcliff Manor, New York)
- Genres: Pop rock; hard rock
- Length: 32:33
- Label: Atlantic
- Producer: Peppi Marchello

Fiona chronology
Fiona (1985)	Beyond the Pale (1986)

Alternative cover
- 2014 remastered edition

Singles from Fiona
- 1. "Talk to Me" Released: 1985

Professional ratings
Review scores
Source	Rating
AllMusic	3/5 stars
Sounds	4/5 stars

Fiona is the debut studio album by the American rock singer and actress Fiona, released on February 12, 1985 through Atlantic Records and reissued in 2004 through Wounded Bird Records. It reached #71 on that year's Billboard 200 chart and remained charted for a week, whilst its lone single "Talk to Me" reached #12 and #64 on Billboard's Hot Mainstream Rock Tracks and Hot 100 charts respectively.

== Track listing ==
No.	Title	Writer(s)	Length
1.	"Hang Your Heart on Me"	Fiona Flanagan, Donnie Kisselbach, Harry Reilly	3:49
2.	"Talk to Me"	Beau Hill	3:50
3.	"You're No Angel"	Peppi Marchello	3:56
4.	"Rescue You"	Marchello	4:13
5.	"James"	Marc Blatte, Flanagan	3:25
6.	"Love Makes You Blind"	Marchello	3:53
7.	"Over Now"	Kisselbach	4:01
8.	"Na Na Song"	Marchello	5:26
Total length:			32:33

== Personnel ==
Musicians

- Fiona – lead vocals
- Bobby Messano – guitar
- George Tebbitt – rhythm guitar on "Love Makes You Blind"
- Benjy King – keyboard
- Aaron Hurwitz – keyboards
- Peter Zale – keyboards
- Joe Franco – drums, percussion
- Donnie Kisselbach – bass
- Schuyler Deale – bass on "Love Makes You Blind"
- Rick Bell – saxophone on "Talk to Me" and "James"
- Elena Aazan, Tom Flanagan, Peppi Marchello, Louie Merlino, "The Mob", Tara O'Boyle, Jimmy Wilcox – backing vocals

Technical

- Gary Heery – cover photography

== Chart performance ==
Album

Year	Chart	Position
1985	Billboard 200	71

Singles

Year	Title	Chart	Position
1985	"Talk to Me"	Billboard Hot Mainstream Rock Tracks	12
1985	"Talk to Me"	Billboard Hot 100	64
