= Fiona (singer) =

American singer (born 1961)

- Born: Fiona Eileen Flanagan; September 13, 1961 (age 65); Phillipsburg, New Jersey, U.S.
- Genres: Glam metal; hard rock
- Occupations: Singer; songwriter; actress
- Years active: 1985–present
- Labels: Atlantic; Geffen; Wounded Bird; Life on the Moon
- Website: fionarock.com

Fiona Eileen Flanagan (born September 13, 1961), known professionally as Fiona, is an American rock singer and actress, best known as the love interest in the 1987 Bob Dylan vehicle Hearts of Fire.

== Career ==
Fiona was born on September 13, 1961, in Phillipsburg, New Jersey, after her parents moved from Dublin, Ireland to the U.S.

At the age of 18, she moved to New York City, where she began her career as a singer in several bands. In the mid-1980s, she was signed to Atlantic Records. Her self-titled debut studio album was released in 1985. The album peaked at No. 71 on that year's Billboard 200 chart and remained charted for a week. The album's sole single, "Talk to Me", reached No. 12 and No. 64 on Billboard's Hot Mainstream Rock Tracks and Hot 100 charts respectively. That same year, she also guested on Aldo Nova's third studio album, Twitch. Around this time, Fiona made her acting debut in the Miami Vice second season episode "Little Miss Dangerous", first aired on January 31, 1986.

Her second studio album, Beyond the Pale, was released in 1986. That album spawned two singles: "Hopelessly Love You" and "Living in a Boy's World". In 1987, Fiona starred opposite Bob Dylan in the musical drama Hearts of Fire. Fiona sings the film's title-track which appears on the film's soundtrack, along with four previously unreleased songs by Fiona. Her third studio album, Heart Like a Gun, was released in 1989. That album also yielded two singles, "Where the Cowboys Go" and "Everything You Do (You're Sexing Me)", a duet with Kip Winger. She has since released two subsequent studio albums, 1992's Squeeze and 2011's Unbroken.

In addition to her own solo work, Fiona has also performed backing vocals for other artists, including on Warrant's Cherry Pie album.

== Personal life ==
Fiona was once married to record producer Beau Hill, who produced, played some instruments on and sang backing vocals on some of her studio albums. Reb Beach of Winger performed on her second studio album Beyond the Pale (1986).

Since taking a break from music, Fiona has married for a second time and graduated from UCLA. She briefly worked for PricewaterhouseCoopers but resigned to have two children, daughter Owen and son Aidan.

== Discography ==
=== Studio albums ===
- Fiona (1985)
- Beyond the Pale (1986)
- Heart Like a Gun (1989)
- Squeeze (1992)
- Unbroken (2011)

=== Compilation albums ===
- Greatest Hits (2009)

=== Singles ===
| Title | Release | Peak chart positions | | Album |
| Title | Release | US | US Main | Album |
|---|---|---|---|---|
| "Love Makes You Blind" | 1984 | — | — | No Small Affair soundtrack |
| "Talk to Me" | 1985 | 64 | 12 | Fiona |
| "Living in a Boy's World" | 1986 | — | — | Beyond the Pale |
| "Hopelessly Love You" | 1986 | — | — | Beyond the Pale |
| "Everything You Do (You're Sexing Me)" | 1989 | 52 | 22 | Heart Like a Gun |
| "Where the Cowboys Go" | 1990 | — | — | Heart Like a Gun |
| "Little Jeannie (Got the Look of Love)" | 1990 | — | — | Heart Like a Gun |
| "Ain't That Just Like Love" | 1992 | — | — | Squeeze |
"—" denotes a recording that did not chart.
