= Stick It Live =

Live album by Slaughter
- Released: 1990
- Recorded: Summer 1990
- Venue: Various venues located in Nashville, Knoxville and Atlanta
- Genre: Glam metal
- Length: 29:26
- Label: Chrysalis
- Producer: Mark Slaughter, Dana Strum

Slaughter chronology
| Stick It to Ya (1990) | Stick It Live (1990) | The Wild Life (1992) |

Professional ratings
Review scores
| Source | Rating |
|---|---|
| Allmusic | 2/5 stars |

Stick It Live is a live EP by American glam metal band Slaughter. The EP was released by Chrysalis Records shortly after the release of the band's debut album. It was also certified gold. The sleevenotes state it was "Recorded Live in the summer of 1990 in Nashville, TN; Knoxville, TN; Atlanta, GA."

== Track listing ==
- All songs written and arranged by Mark Slaughter and Dana Strum. (Topless Music/Chrysalis Music)

| No. | Title | Length |
|---|---|---|
| 1. | "Burnin' Bridges" | 4:29 |
| 2. | "Eye to Eye" | 6:25 |
| 3. | "Fly to the Angels" | 6:07 |
| 4. | "Up All Night" | 6:38 |
| 5. | "Loaded Gun" | 5:44 |

Bonus tracks on 1991 Japanese CD
| No. | Title | Length |
|---|---|---|
| 6. | "Stick It To Ya" (Medley) | 2:24 |
| 7. | "Spend My Life" | 3:18 |

- Bonus tracks omitted from 2005 remaster.

== Personnel ==
- Mark Slaughter - Lead Vocals, Rhythm Guitar, and Keyboards
- Tim Kelly - Lead Guitar
- Dana Strum - Bass
- Blas Elias - Drums

== Production ==
- Art Direction: Glen Wexler
- Photography: Glen Wexler
