= Back to Reality (Slaughter album) =

Studio album by Slaughter
- Released: June 29, 1999
- Genres: Heavy metal, Hard rock
- Length: 50:16
- Label: CMC
- Producers: Dana Strum; Slaughter

Slaughter chronology
Revolution (1997)	Back to Reality (1999)

Professional ratings
Review scores
Source	Rating
AllMusic	3/5 stars

Back to Reality is the fifth and final studio album by American heavy metal band Slaughter, released in 1999. It is the only studio album with guitarist Jeff Blando, who replaced Tim Kelly. Since then, frontman Mark Slaughter has released solo albums under his name.

== Track listing ==
All tracks are written by Blas Elias, Dana Strum, Jeff Blando, and Mark Slaughter.

No.	Title	Length
1.	"Killin Time"	3:58
2.	"All Fired Up"	4:32
3.	"Take Me Away"	4:04
4.	"Dangerous"	3:48
5.	"Trailer Park Boogie"	3:15
6.	"Love Is Forever"	6:00
7.	"Bad Groove"	3:32
8.	"On My Own"	5:01
9.	"Silence Of Ba"	2:36
10.	"Headin For A Dream"	4:56
11.	"Nothin Left To Lose"	3:42
