= Fear No Evil (Slaughter album) =

Studio album by Slaughter
- Released: May 2, 1995
- Recorded: 1993–1994
- Genre: Heavy metal
- Length: 52:19
- Label: CMC International

Slaughter chronology
Mass Slaughter: The Best of Slaughter (1995)	Fear No Evil (1995)	Revolution (1997)

Fear No Evil is the third album by the American band Slaughter. The record was completed while the band was still signed to Chrysalis Records. It was released May 2, 1995 through CMC International.

The album peaked at No. 182 on the Billboard 200. A video was made for '"Searchin'". The band supported the album with a North American tour.

Fear No Evil has sold around 500,000 copies.

== Production ==
Prior to the recording sessions, singer Mark Slaughter was recovering from a 1992 nodule surgery on his vocal cords, guitarist Tim Kelly had been charged with drug trafficking, and bassist Dana Strum was rehabilitating from a motorcycle accident that injured his playing hand. The album title was picked by the band's fans, as part of a contest. The songs were written in 1992 and 1993.

== Critical reception ==
Professional ratings
Review scores
Source	Rating
AllMusic	2.5/5 stars
Calgary Herald	E
The Encyclopedia of Popular Music	3/5 stars
New Straits Times	2.5/5 stars

The Sun-Sentinel wrote that "it's pretty much what fans expect, with a few tentative melodies and instrumental breaks thrown in for good measure." The Calgary Herald called the album "textbook '80s thud-rock," and gave it an "E" (in homage to Robert Christgau), for "a record often cited as proof that God does not exist."

The New Straits Times concluded that "the slam-bangers are ordinary and cliche-ridden but the slower songs, despite having borrowed touches, are rather enjoyable." The Columbus Dispatch dismissed Fear No Evil as "the Chipmunks' tribute to Soundgarden."

AllMusic wrote that Slaughter "never were among the best pop-metal groups, lacking the hooks and charisma to make it to the top, but Fear No Evil shows that they could rock harder than anyone would have expected."

== Track listing ==
All tracks are written by Mark Slaughter and Dana Strum.

No.	Title	Length
1.	"Live Like There's No Tomorrow"	5:45
2.	"Get Used to It"	3:34
3.	"Searchin'"	4:27
4.	"It'll Be Alright"	5:14
5.	"Let the Good Times Roll"	3:31
6.	"Breakdown n' Cry"	6:07
7.	"Hard Times"	5:56
8.	"Divine Order"	1:10
9.	"Yesterday's Gone"	5:12
10.	"Prelude"	1:55
11.	"Outta My Head"	3:51
12.	"Unknown Destination"	5:29
13.	"For Your Dreams" (Japanese remaster bonus track)	5:44

== Personnel ==
- Mark Slaughter – lead vocals and keyboards
- Tim Kelly – guitar
- Dana Strum – bass
- Blas Elias – drums
- A.T Das – guitar
- James SK Wān – bamboo flute

== Charts ==
Chart (1995)	Peak position
US Billboard 200	182
