= Star Licks Productions =

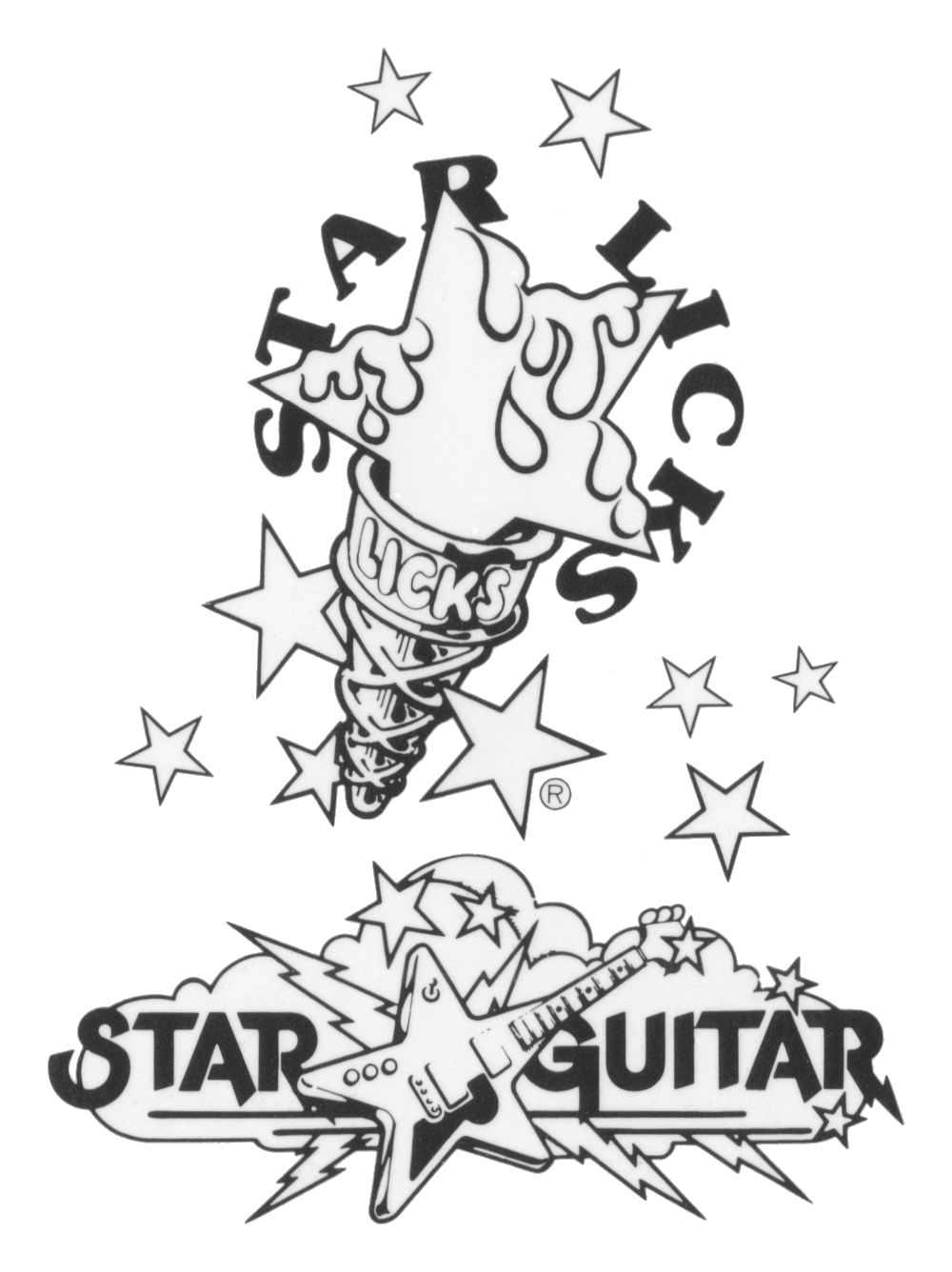
- Star Licks / Star Guitar logos (1983)
- Industry: Music Education
- Founded: 1982
- Founder: Mark Freed, Andrew Cross, Robert Decker
- Defunct: 1999
- Headquarters: Santa Monica, California
- Area served: Global
- Key people: Wolf Marshall, Al Lapin Jr., Rex Olson
- Products: Star Licks Lead Guitar Series; Star Guitar; Star Jam; Star Licks Master Series; Star Licks Master Sessions
- Services: Instructional Video/Audio products
- Parent: Hal Leonard Corporation

Star Licks Productions (also known as StarLicks) was an instructional music publishing company conceived by Mark Freed and co-founded by Andrew Cross and Robert Decker. The company was at the forefront of creating instructional videos featuring well-known musicians demonstrating their unique musical styles and techniques on-camera.

In 1984, the company's video portfolio debuted with a wide-ranging group of musicians including: Brian May of Queen, Steve Lukather of Toto, Tony Iommi of Black Sabbath, Al McKay of Earth, Wind & Fire, Carlos Cavazo of Quiet Riot, Louis Johnson of The Brothers Johnson, noted country guitarist, Albert Lee, and acclaimed guitarist/educator Wolf Marshall."

== Other notable artists (Alphabetized) ==
- Michael Angelo Batio
- Jeff Berlin
- Jason Bonham of Bonham
- Larry Carlton
- Randy Castillo of Ozzy Osbourne and Mötley Crüe
- Nathan East
- Blas Elias of Slaughter
- Rik Emmett of Triumph
- Ray Flacke
- Flea of Red Hot Chili Peppers
- Brad Gillis of Night Ranger
- Ray Gomez
- Larry Graham
- Jim Hall
- Ray Hitchins
- James Jamerson, Jr.
- Robert Johnson
- Davey Johnstone of Elton John
- Stanley Jordan
- John Jorgenson
- Abe Laboriel
- Bruce Lowe
- Tony MacAlpine
- Michael Manring
- Chet McCracken
- Byron Miller
- Dave Navarro
- Ted Nugent
- Les Paul
- Jeff Porcaro of Toto
- Steve Porcaro of Toto
- Trevor Rabin of Yes
- Chuck Rainey
- Rowan Robertson
- Mark Slaughter of Slaughter
- Phil Soussan
- Chris Squire of Yes
- Dana Strum
- Neil Stubenhaus
- Chester Thompson
- Joe Walsh of The Eagles
- Freddie Washington
- Jeff Watson of Night Ranger
- Verdine White of Earth, Wind & Fire
- Mark Whitfield
- Nancy Wilson of Heart
- Simon Wright of AC/DC and Dio
