= Up All Night (Slaughter song) =

Single by Slaughter

from the album Stick It to Ya
- Released: April 17, 1990
- Recorded: 1989
- Genre: Glam metal
- Length: 3:46 (single version) 4:16 (album version)
- Label: Chrysalis
- Songwriters: Dana Strum; Mark Slaughter
- Producers: Dana Strum; Mark Slaughter

Slaughter singles chronology
| "Up All Night" (1990) | "Fly to the Angels" (1990) |

Music video
- "Up All Night" on YouTube

"Up All Night" is a song by American glam metal band Slaughter. Written by band members Mark Slaughter and Dana Strum, it was the third title on the band's debut album, Stick It to Ya, and the band's first single. It was released in 1990.

== Music video ==
The music video was directed by Michael Bay, and was placed on The New York Times' list of 15 Essential Hair-Metal Videos.

== Track listing ==
7" single

Side A
| No. | Title | Length |
|---|---|---|
| 1. | "Up All Night" (radio edit) | 3:46 |

Side B
| No. | Title | Length |
|---|---|---|
| 1. | "Eye to Eye" | 3:57 |

CD single

| No. | Title | Length |
|---|---|---|
| 1. | "Up All Night" (radio edit) | 3:48 |
| 2. | "Up All Night" (album version) | 4:16 |

Maxi single

| No. | Title | Length |
|---|---|---|
| 1. | "Up All Night" |
| 2. | "Eye to Eye" |
| 3. | "Stick It to Ya Medley" (medley of "Mad About You," "Burnin' Bridges," and "Fly to the Angels") |

== Personnel ==
- Mark Slaughter – lead vocals, guitar, keyboards
- Tim Kelly – guitar, backing vocals
- Dana Strum – bass, backing vocals
- Blas Elias – drums, backing vocals

== Charts ==
| Chart (1990) | Peak position |
|---|---|
| UK Singles (OCC) | 62 |
| US Billboard Hot 100 | 27 |
| US Album Rock Tracks (Billboard) | 21 |
