= Days Gone By =

Days Gone By may refer to:

== Albums ==
- Days Gone By (James House album), 1995
- Days Gone By (Bob Moses album), 2015

== Songs ==
- "Days Gone By", an 1870s song by Joseph Philip Knight
- "Days Gone By", a song from the 1998 Poco album The Ultimate Collection
- "Days Gone By", a song from the 1973 Joe Walsh album The Smoker You Drink, the Player You Get
- "Days Gone By", a song from the 1995 Ronnie Hawkins from Let It Rock
- "Days Gone By", a song from the 1992 Slaughter album The Wild Life
- "Days Gone By", a 1965 song by Eddy Arnold
- "Days Gone By", a song from the 1993 Godstar album Sleeper
- "Days Gone By", a song from the 1995 James House album Days Gone By

== See also ==
- Days Gone Bye (disambiguation)
- Days Go By (The Offspring album), 2012
