= Stick It to Ya =

Studio album by Slaughter
- Released: January 23, 1990
- Recorded: May–June 1989
- Studios: Red Zone Studios, Studio 55 and Pasha Music House
- Genre: Glam metal
- Length: 48:54
- Label: Chrysalis
- Producers: Dana Strum; Mark Slaughter

Slaughter chronology
Stick It to Ya (1990)	Stick It Live (1990)

Singles from Stick It to Ya
- 1. "Up All Night" Released: April 17, 1990; 2. "Fly to the Angels" Released: July 23, 1990; 3. "Spend My Life" Released: December 4, 1990; 4. "Mad About You" Released: April 2, 1991

Stick It to Ya is the debut studio album by American glam metal band Slaughter. It was released in 1990 by Chrysalis Records. It sold over 2 million copies and became one of the biggest albums of 1990. "Up All Night" (No. 27), "Fly to the Angels" (No. 19), and "Spend My Life" (No. 39) all charted in the Top 40 on Billboard's Hot 100 and their videos were in solid rotations on the various music television outlets. "Mad About You" also received considerable airplay on Album Rock stations as the band toured to support the release. The LP was also nominated for best metal album of the year at the 1991 American Music Awards show. Music videos were made for the singles "Up All Night", "Fly to the Angels", "Spend My Life", and "Mad About You".

== Critical reception ==
Professional ratings
Review scores
Source	Rating
AllMusic	4/5 stars
Chicago Tribune	3/4 stars
Christgau's Consumer Guide	D
Metal Hammer	3.5/5 stars

The Chicago Tribune called Stick It to Ya "a smart, sassy pop-metal effort."

== Track listing ==
All songs written, arranged and produced by Mark Slaughter & Dana Strum.

No.	Title	Length
1.	"Eye to Eye"	3:57
2.	"Burnin' Bridges"	4:07
3.	"Up All Night"	4:16
4.	"Spend My Life"	3:21
5.	"Thinking of June"	1:05
6.	"She Wants More"	3:55
7.	"Fly to the Angels"	5:05
8.	"Mad About You"	4:05
9.	"That's Not Enough"	3:25
10.	"You Are the One"	3:55
11.	"Gave Me Your Heart"	3:51
12.	"Desperately"	3:34
13.	"Loaded Gun"	4:18
Total length:		48:54

Bonus tracks
No.	Title	Length
14.	"Fly to the Angels" (Acoustic version)	3:22
15.	"Wingin' It"	1:11
Total length:		53:27

2003 re-issue
No.	Title	Length
16.	"Mad About You" (Original Demo)	3:27
17.	"She Wants More" (Original Demo)	3:56
18.	"Up All Night" (Original Demo)	3:46
19.	"Fly to the Angels" (Original Demo)	5:05
Total length:		69:41

== Personnel ==
Band members

- Mark Slaughter - Lead vocals, guitar, keyboards
- Tim Kelly - Guitar, background vocals
- Dana Strum - Bass, background vocals
- Blas Elias - Drums, percussion, background vocals

Additional musicians

- Todd Cooper - Horns
- Gerri Miller - Camera noises

Production

- Produced by Mark Slaughter & Dana Strum
- Production coordination by Scott Cadwallader
- Engineer: Andy Chappel
- Mixing: Brian Malouf
- Mastering: Bob Ludwig

== Charts ==
=== Weekly charts ===
Chart (1990–91)	Peak position
Australian Albums (ARIA)	130
Canada Top Albums/CDs (RPM)	45
German Albums (Offizielle Top 100)	58
Swiss Albums (Schweizer Hitparade)	32
US Billboard 200	18

=== Year-end charts ===
Chart (1990)	Position
US Billboard 200	23

Chart (1991)	Position
US Billboard 200	68

== Certifications ==
Region	Certification	Certified units/sales
Canada (Music Canada)	Platinum	100,000^{^}
United States (RIAA)	2× Platinum	2,000,000^{^}
^{^} Shipments figures based on certification alone.

== Singles ==
- Up All Night / Eye to Eye - April 17, 1990 - Chrysalis 23486 #27 US Hot 100
- Fly to the Angels / Desperately - July 23, 1990 - Chrysalis 23527 #19 US Hot 100
- Spend My Life / She Wants More - December 4, 1990 - Chrysalis 23605 #39 US Hot 100
- Mad About You / Up All Night (Live) - April 2, 1991 - Chrysalis 23699

== Cover art ==
- Art direction: Glen Wexler and Hugh Syme
- Photography: Glen Wexler
- Model: Laurie Carr

This image used on the cover of the album was the last project Wexler created using traditional darkroom methods. The target girl posed in his studio, and a miniature set of the carnival was placed in perspective for the background.

== In popular culture ==
- "Up All Night" is featured on the soundtrack of American Satan (2017).
- "Fly to the Angels" is featured on the soundtrack of FUBAR 2 (2010).
- Stick It to Ya is referenced in "The Graduates," the 25th episode of the fourth season of the American television sitcom Full House when characters on the series discuss sneaking into a Slaughter concert.
