= The Wild Life (album) =

Studio album by Slaughter
- Released: April 21, 1992
- Recorded: 1991
- Genres: Glam metal; hard rock
- Length: 63:18
- Label: Chrysalis
- Producers: Mark Slaughter; Dana Strum

Slaughter chronology
| Stick It Live (1990) | The Wild Life (1992) | Mass Slaughter: The Best of Slaughter (1995) |

Professional ratings
Review scores
| Source | Rating |
|---|---|
| AllMusic | 2.5/5 stars |
| Raw | 4/5 stars |
| Rolling Stone | 3/5 stars |

The Wild Life is the second studio album by American rock band Slaughter. It was released in 1992 by Chrysalis Records. The album cover was designed by John Kosh.

The album produced the hit singles "The Wild Life", "Days Gone By" and "Real Love". It was certified gold.

The album debuted at Number 8 on the Billboard 200 album Charts.

== Track listing ==
All tracks are written by Mark Slaughter and Dana Strum.

The Wild Life track listing
| No. | Title | Length |
|---|---|---|
| 1. | "Reach for the Sky" | 5:30 |
| 2. | "Out for Love" | 3:31 |
| 3. | "The Wild Life" | 3:24 |
| 4. | "Days Gone By" | 4:34 |
| 5. | "Dance for Me Baby" | 3:20 |
| 6. | "Times They Change" | 7:07 |
| 7. | "Move to the Music" | 4:37 |
| 8. | "Real Love" | 3:40 |
| 9. | "Shake This Place" | 3:36 |
| 10. | "Streets of Broken Hearts" | 4:39 |
| 11. | "Hold On" | 3:55 |
| 12. | "Do Ya Know" | 6:25 |
| 13. | "Old Man" | 5:26 |
| 14. | "Days Gone By" (acoustic instrumental version) | 3:35 |

2003 remaster bonus track
| No. | Title | Length |
|---|---|---|
| 15. | "Real Love" (Demo) | 3:39 |
| 16. | "Perfect World" | 5:03 |

== Personnel ==
Slaughter

- Mark Slaughter – vocals, guitar, keyboards, piano
- Tim Kelly – guitar
- Dana Strum – bass
- Blas Elias – drums

Session members

- A.T. Das – guitar
- James SK Wān – bamboo flute

Production

- Scott Cadwallader – production coordination
- Jeff Clark – engineering
- Gene Kirkland – photography
- Scott Lovelis – engineering
- Bob Ludwig – mastering
- Jeff Moses – engineering, mixing assistant
- John Schmit – mixing assistant

== Charts ==
| Chart (1992) | Peak position |
|---|---|
| Australian Albums (ARIA) | 95 |
| Canada Top Albums/CDs (RPM) | 13 |
| Finnish Albums (The Official Finnish Charts) | 40 |
| Japanese Albums (Oricon) | 49 |
| Swiss Albums (Schweizer Hitparade) | 37 |
| UK Albums (Official Charts) | 64 |
| US Billboard 200 | 8 |

== Certifications ==
| Region | Certification | Certified units/sales |
|---|---|---|
| Canada (Music Canada) | Gold | 50,000^{^} |
| United States (RIAA) | Gold | 500,000^{^} |
^{^} Shipments figures based on certification alone.
