= Dana Strum =

American bassist (born 1957)

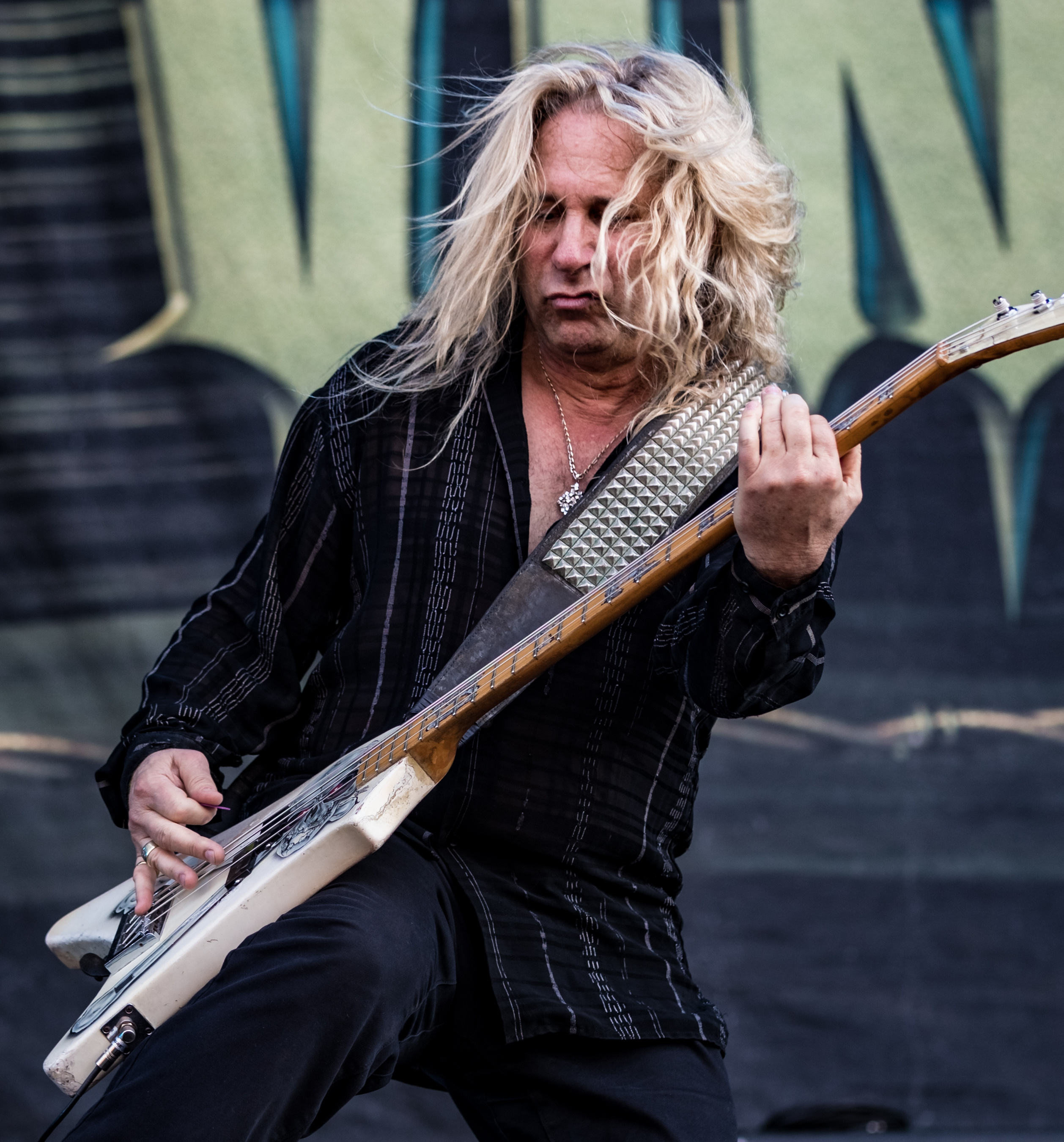
- Strum at Wacken Open Air 2018

Background information
- Born: Dana Strumwasser; December 13, 1957 (age 68); Washington, D.C., U.S.
- Genres: Hard rock; glam metal; heavy metal
- Occupations: Bassist; songwriter; record producer
- Years active: 1970s–present
- Member of: Slaughter; Vince Neil
- Formerly of: Vinnie Vincent Invasion; Danny Spanos; Modern Design; BadAxe
- Website: danastrum.com; slaughterusa.com

Dana Strum (born Dana Strumwasser on December 13, 1957) is an American musician who is a co-founder, bass player, and one of the two primary songwriters of the hard rock band Slaughter, an American Music Awards winner, formed in 1988. He first achieved commercial success as a member of an ex-Kiss guitarist act, Vinnie Vincent Invasion, along with his future Slaughter bandmate Mark Slaughter.

Based in Los Angeles, Strum has claimed responsibility for introducing the guitarist Randy Rhoads to Ozzy Osbourne, as well as bringing Jake E. Lee to Ozzy's solo band following Rhoads's death. Strum has worked with a number of artists and groups, playing bass, co-writing, and/or producing songs, such as The Beach Boys, Détente, Sweet Savage, Ace Frehley, Kik Tracee, Dennis Bono, Vince Neil, and Ozzy Osbourne, among others.

== Early life ==
Strum's family came from Trinidad, British West Indies. He was born in Washington, D.C. and spent his childhood in Pasadena, California. His father was a scientist working in neurobiology and a professor and researcher of psychiatry and neuroscience. Strum's mother worked on creating cling-free nylon.

Strum began playing bass guitar aged eight despite his parents' disapproval. Growing up in Los Angeles during his teenage years, his playing was influenced by rock performers such as Black Sabbath and Grand Funk Railroad. His first concert was a Black Sabbath/Captain Beyond gig in Hollywood, California. He began playing professionally on the Los Angeles Club Circuit aged sixteen.

== Music career ==
=== 1976–1979: BadAxe ===
Strum began his career in the late 1970s as a member of the progressive hard rock band BadAxe in Los Angeles, California. The band performed on the LA Circuit Scene alongside Van Halen and Quiet Riot. BadAxe gained attention for their sound, which was similar to that of bands like Black Sabbath and Deep Purple. In November 1976, BadAxe recorded an album at Stronghold Studios with Strum also serving as producer. A limited number of test pressings of the album were released by Earth Breeze Productions. The following year, the band recorded the single "Cry For Me" / "All You Can Stand" at Dalton Studios in Santa Monica, CA with Strum also co-producing.

Strum left BadAxe in the summer of 1979 when he was offered the opportunity to audition for Ozzy Osbourne and become his new bass player. Osbourne was looking to form a new band following his split from Black Sabbath. Strum is credited with introducing Randy Rhoads to Osbourne at that time.

=== 1981–1983: Modern Design ===
In the early 1980s, Strum joined the group Modern Design, with Ron Mancuso on guitar, Louie Merlino on vocals, and Joey DePompeis on drums. According to Mancuso in an interview from 2010, the band had significant interest from well-known producers and engineers. Modern Design began working with Pasha Records, a label that at the time was releasing records for The Beach Boys and Vanilla Fudge, among others. Despite being close to securing a record deal with multiple labels, it ultimately fell through.

In January 1983, while still a member of Modern Design, Strum held auditions for Ozzy Osbourne, who was searching for a replacement guitar player following the death of Randy Rhoads in a plane crash in March 1982. Jake E. Lee, lead guitarist for the band Rough Cutt, was ultimately chosen for the position, beating out George Lynch, the former guitar player for Xciter and The Boyz.

=== 1983–1985: Danny Spanos ===
While working at Pasha Records, Strum along with other members of Modern Design collaborated with Danny Spanos, a former drummer turned singer, who was also recording at the studio. In late November 1983, they opened for Cheap Trick in Kiel Opera House, St. Louis, MO, and the performance was recorded live for the RKO Radio Network. The band's album Looks Like Trouble was produced by Spencer Proffer and released in 1984. Strum also contributed to the album as a writer on the tracks "Good Girl" and "Looks Like Trouble".

=== 1985–1988: Vinnie Vincent Invasion ===
In 1985, Strum joined former Kiss guitarist Vinnie Vincent to form Vinnie Vincent Invasion. Robert Fleishman, the ex-vocalist for Journey, was hired as their lead singer. Over the next few months, the band went through a process of auditioning drummers until the Houston-born Bobby Rock joined the band in October 1985. Vinnie Vincent Invasion signed an eight-album deal with Chrysalis Records.

After releasing their self-titled debut album in 1986, Fleischman left the group. Mark Slaughter, who Strum met while producing Sin, was brought in as the Vinnie Vincent Invasion new lead vocalist. The video "Boys Are Gonna Rock", directed by Jeff Stein, was produced featuring Mark Slaughter as the singer over Fleischman's vocal track. The video received heavy rotation on MTV. At that time, the band's look was entirely over the top glam. Strum spent the next months touring North America with Vinnie Vincent Invasion, opening for acts such as Alice Cooper and Iron Maiden.

Dana played somewhat of a producer role to Vinnie as they tracked solos, since he offered excellent suggestions and direction along the way, and got great performances out of him. Dana was also an extraordinary engineer when it came to "punching in", which is kind of like doing live edits.

— Bobby Rock, on Strum's role while recording The Invasion's albums

All Systems Go, the Vinnie Vincent Invasion's second LP for Chrysalis, was recorded at Cherokee Studios. Strum was credited as co-producer, arranger, and engineer while recording the band's albums. Bobby Rock stated in an interview that Strum played a producer role to Vinnie Vincent, offering suggestions and direction while tracking solos, and being "an extraordinary engineer when it came to "punching in."

All Systems Go, released in May 1988, had a more accessible hard rock sound than their debut album and the band went on a headlining club tour with a few theaters included. The music video for "That Time of Year" became an MTV hit. In August, the band put out "Love Kills", the title song for the movie A Nightmare on Elm Street 4: The Dream Master. The single was also released as a music video.

Three months after the release of their second album, Vinnie Vincent Invasion played their final concert on August 26, 1988, in Anaheim, California, and it was officially announced that the group had disbanded. In an interview with Circus magazine in late 1988, Mark Slaughter stated that the split was amicable, saying "When we first joined the Invasion, we were told that it would be a group situation, but it gradually changed to the point where we were all sidemen. Vinnie wants to be a guitar hero, we want to be a band." Slaughter also explained that Strum was fired by Vincent, and Slaughter had the choice to stay but chose to leave the band and go with Strum.

=== Since 1988: Slaughter ===
==== 1988–1989: Formation ====
After leaving Vinnie Vincent Invasion in August 1988, Dana Strum shared a cramped apartment in Los Angeles with seven other struggling musicians, including his former and future bandmate Mark Slaughter. Strum revealed that despite having similar modes of thought, he and Slaughter were "two distinctly different animals". However, their differences worked to their advantage, and after securing a deal with Chrysalis Records, they wrote songs, often penning lyrics on top of Domino's Pizza boxes at 3 a.m., and held formal auditions for their new band They sought two individuals who shared their "one for all and all for one" philosophy, had no issues with substance abuse, and were "fan oriented".

Guitarist Tim Kelly joined after meeting Mark Slaughter at a barbecue, while drummer Blas Elias secured his spot after impressing the two in a videotaped audition and playing live in Los Angeles.

==== 1989–1992: Breakthrough with Stick It To Ya ====
After forming the band in January 1989, all four members lived together in a small apartment working on songs with a drum machine and four-track. Soon, they entered the Record Plant to start tracking demos.

His skills in the studio helped Slaughter create the band's unique sound with "bluesy feel", a "definite melodic bass", and a "gutsy, nasty attitude", and also achieve their goal of creating songs with an eye towards commercial success on radio and MTV, and playing concert arenas.

The band aimed "to bring back emotion into rock 'n' roll", characterizing their music as “very energetic and very raw”. According to Dana Strum, the band's songs were inspired by true-life experiences, ”either about something that we went through or something we both perceive a lot of people go through but can't get a chance to express for themselves."

Strum produced the band's debut album, Stick It To Ya, alongside Mark Slaughter. It was recorded at several studios in Los Angeles, California, and was released in January 1990 on Chrysalis Records. Stick It To Ya was the first album on the label to be released exclusively on CD and cassette, with a limited number of vinyl copies distributed to select fans and media members. Prior to its release, the band conducted extensive test marketing in multiple cities, including Chicago. The album received positive reviews, with critics calling it "a smart, sassy pop-metal effort", "full of musical talent". Slaughter's first hit single, "Up All Night", directed by Michael Bay, debuted on Headbangers' Ball and held the No 1 spot on Dial-MTV for eight weeks in March and April 1990.

The cover of Stick It to Ya caused some controversy for depicting a woman bound to a carnival wheel with knives being thrown. Responding to the criticism, Strum clarified that it was not intended to be anti-women and meant to represent the "wheel of life". The band was originally planned to be featured on the wheel, but the record company opted to use a photo of Robbin Crosby's girlfriend, Lori Carr, instead.

In an interview, Strum revealed that Slaughter was "actually formed at the Record Plant in Los Angeles, rather than by going out and playing the club circuit". The band made their live debut on May 4, 1990, opening for Kiss on the Hot In The Shade Tour in Lubbock, Texas, on the day when Slaughter's first album received a gold record, signifying 500,000 copies sold.

Stick It To Ya became the band's most commercially successful album thanks to heavy airplay on MTV and support slots on Kiss's American tour, that was certified Platinum three months later. The album peaked at number 18 and remained on the Billboard 200 album chart for six months. Three months after its release, Stick It To Ya received a Platinum certification, indicating that it had sold over one million copies. Slaughter's single and video, Fly To The Angels, reached No.1 on MTV.

In 1990, Slaughter released a live mini-album called Stick It Live, featuring five songs from their debut release, which sold 500,000 copies and certified Gold. They also released their first long-form video, titled From The Beginning, including their first clips and behind-the-scenes footage on tour with Kiss, which ultimately, also certified Gold. In August of that year, the band participated in the MTV Celebrity Challenge at the Denver Grand Prix along with members of Mötley Crüe, Skid Row and Winger, among others, with Dana Strum finishing fifth in the race.

With Strum and the rest of the band members moving to Las Vegas, Slaughter became the first internationally recognized hard rock band based in Las Vegas, Nevada by December 1990. They played their first-ever concert in their hometown of Las Vegas on December 15, 1990. The day prior, the mayor proclaimed December 14 as Slaughter Rock Band Day and changed the name of Las Vegas Boulevard to Slaughter Boulevard for the day. The band also received the keys to the city, and the event was covered on national TV.

In January 1991, Strum and the other members of Slaughter collectively received the American Music Award for Best New Hard Rock/Heavy Metal Artist, and their album Stick It To Ya went double Platinum. The band also released their third music video for the song Spend My Life, which reached No.1 on MTV chart.

We've spoken very openly that we don't. A lot of people said that was totally wrong, that's not rock 'n' roll. But I want to be a musician, not a drug addict. I wanted to play music and make people feel good.

— Dana Strum on the band's attitude to drugs

The band was vocal about their stance on drugs from the beginning, stating in interviews that they don't do drugs and wanted to focus on making music. As a testament to this commitment, Slaughter performed a free concert outside a Taco Bell in Miami in March 1991 to raise money for the Miami Coalition for a Drug-Free Community. Dana Strum described it as the "most ridiculously fun thing" they had done as a band.

During their tour with Kiss, Slaughter received a request from Interscope Records to write a song for the movie Bill & Ted's Bogus Journey, which starred Keanu Reeves. Despite their commitment to opening for Cinderella's tour, Dana Strum and Mark Slaughter wrote the song "Shout It Out" in a hotel conference room. The track went on to achieve gold status, and a music video was produced that featured scenes from the movie.

==== 1992–1995: Living The Wild Life ====
Dana Strum, along with Mark Slaughter, co-wrote and co-produced Slaughter's second studio LP, The Wild Life. The album was recorded in the same studio the band tracked their first, The Red Zone in Burbank, California, with drums recorded at Pasha Records, where Strum had previously worked and lived. Blas Elias commented to The Modern Drummer magazine, "Dana grew up there. When he was starting out as an engineer, he was sweeping floors at Pasha and working for [owner] Spencer Proffer, so he knew the studio really well and liked the sound of it. And of course, when you have a good thing, you don't want to change it."

Discussing The Wild Life in interviews, Dana Strum and Mark Slaughter inevitably mentioned classic rock giants like Queen, Boston and Journey. While Strum characterized the album as a "harder-edged record", music critics described Slaughter's second studio effort as "over-flowing with quick 'n' catchy riffs, memorable melodies, layers of vocal harmonies, and stretches of sound effects." The album featured 13 tracks, and debuted at No.8 on the Billboard album chart in April 1992, continuing the commercial success of Stick It To Ya, two months after Slaughter sent out a six-song demo tape of The Wild Life to a large number of active members of its fan club. Strum later explained that it was their "way of giving the fans something the regular public couldn't get". In an interview with Chicago Tribune, Strum emphasized that Slaughter was "the only self-produced, self-written" new American rock band at the time. He added, "When the fans hear something by Slaughter, they know it's ours."

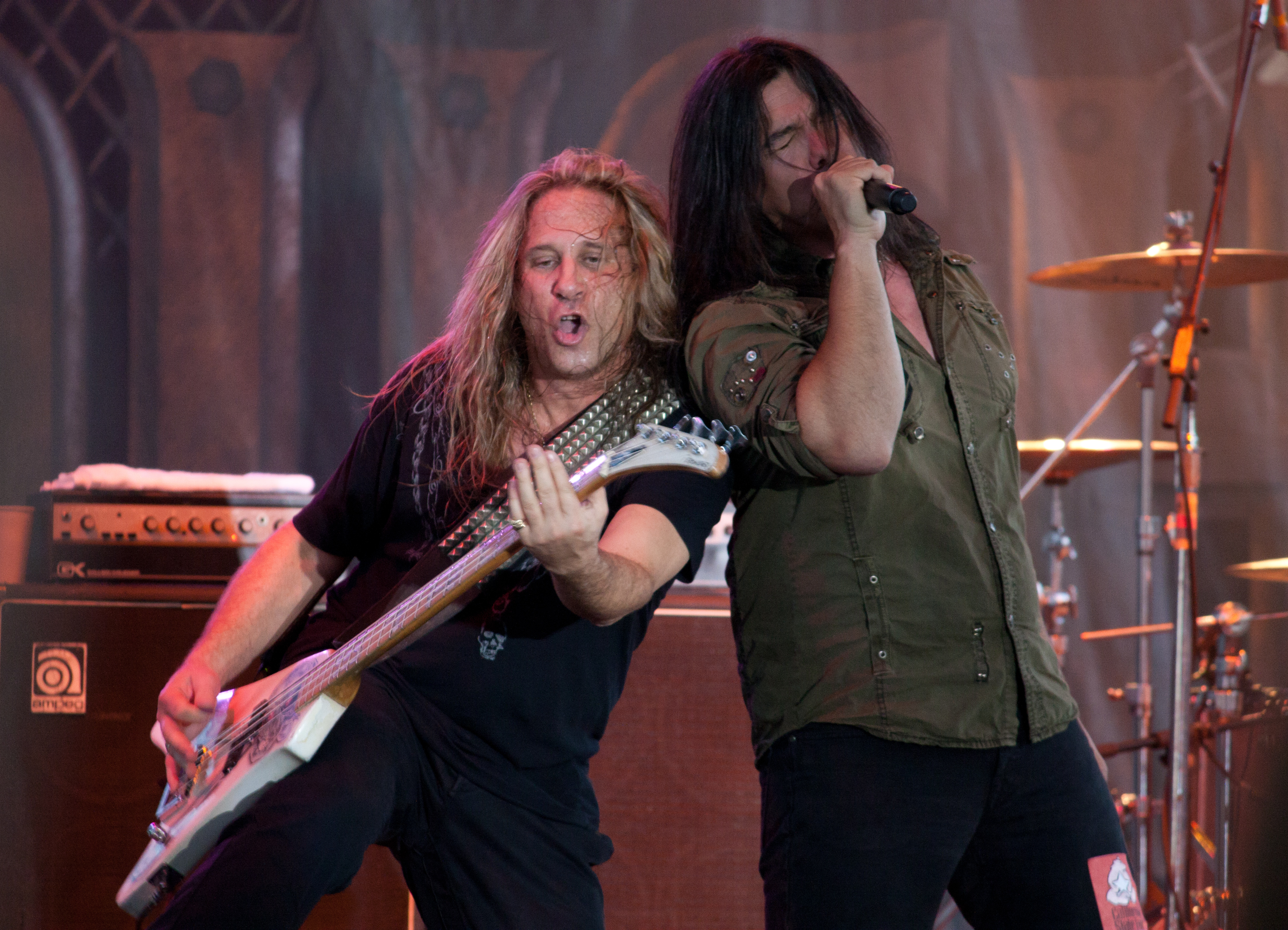
Dana Strum and Mark Slaughter performing live at California State Fair in 2010

Accompanying the album was a home video documentary also called "The Wild Life", which showcased the making of the album, also including profiles of the band members. The video eventually certified Gold. It featured the title track video as well as videos to "Days Gone By" and the unreleased at the time clip of "Mad About You". In addition, it contained the video of the recording of "Times They Change" that was inspired by Slaughter's European tour during the Gulf War, among others. Describing the documentary, Dana Strum explained that he "wanted to show more than the usual band on the road, in the tour bus, leaving the hotel, signing autographs". In fact, all of the music on the home video, except for the finished video clips was Slaughter working on demos.

The cover art for The Wild Life was controversial, featuring a 17th-century line drawing of a man cracking a whip high over the head of a child who shields himself as he holds a guitar, which the band explained was supposed to show the oppression of youth by adults. Guitarist Tim Kelly explained, "when we saw this picture, we saw Dana and myself as the child who was not supported in his ambitions.

The tour in support of the record launched in June with Ozzy Osbourne and Ugly Kid Joe in Portland, Oregon. The Wild Life was certified Platinum in the United States by July 1992. The music video for "Real Love" was released around this time and became the band's first world premiere.

In September 1992, Strum was invited to serve as a guest host for the popular radio show Rockline, filling in for Bob Coburn. During his episode, Strum welcomed Joe Satriani and his band as well as Bonham, as special guests.

==== 1995–1998: Fear No Evil ====
Strum played an instrumental role in the production of Slaughter's third studio album, Fear No Evil. During the writing of the album, Strum and the rest of the band encountered several setbacks. In 1993, Guitarist Tim Kelly and the band's tour manager were arrested on six-year-old drug charges, causing uncertainty as to whether Kelly would ever tour with the band again. In July of that year, Strum's dirt bike was struck by a drunk driver within a half-mile of his house in Las Vegas, Nevada, causing 17 broken bones including his left wrist and two fingers on the left hand he plays bass with. He later admitted that if he hadn't been wearing a helmet he'd be dead.

Despite these challenges, Fear No Evil was completed in February 1994, followed by the tour with Damn Yankees that started that same month., when the band headed to South America and began 1994 touring, this time as headliners, in the Midwest. By that time, the band's record label, Chrysalis, was sold to EMI. Leaning on his credentials as the band's producer, Strum helped Slaughter successfully leave Chrysalis and they signed a deal with an independent label,CMC International Records, a North Carolina–based label that supported "American self-written, self-produced rock 'n' roll". According to Strum, "it was definitely a risky decision". "No one knew what was going to happen with CMC at the time, but we were fed up with the corporate thinking of a major label and we liked the hands-on attitude that CMC label president Tom Lipsky seemed to have," he explained.

Fear No Evil was finally released in May 1995 in Europe and Japan and showed the band's growth and diversity, with a mix of traditional Slaughter rockers and a more diverse musical style. "The band has grown as people and as musicians, but we still stay true to our kind of music," Strum stated. "Unknown Destination", the band's final cut, which Strum called their "most aggressive rocker" was influenced by the days when Strum and Slaughter were in Vinnie Vincent Invasion and toured with Iron Maiden.

However, the album failed to have the same commercial impact as previous releases and received mixed reviews from critics. The band embarked on a long, 18-month American tour to promote it. During this tour, Slaughter took a month in the late summer of 1995 to embark on their first tour of Japan. According to the band, the tour was a long overdue overwhelming success even though Kelly's ongoing legal issues forced Slaughter to perform with Vince Neil's guitarist Dave Marshall, Tim Kelly's long-time friend.

We've never run on our fans. We're not a band that's going to shave our heads just because it's popular. We want to re-establish old memories and tell new fans to come out and hear who we are. That's our attitude. [105]

— Dana Strum on the band's attitude

The band's notorious album covers continued with Fear No Evil which featured a woman being "intimate with a snake".

Despite facing adversity, the band did not disband or made any personnel changes. Dana Strum emphasized that Slaughter was among the few bands in their genre to have remained intact, stating, "We were one of the few bands of our genre that has not broken up... never changed our members and never given up." He further explained, "Our collective decision is to simply make a Slaughter record and not be concerned with passing trends or the business we're in."

==== 1997–1998: Revolution ====
Slaughter's fourth studio album, Revolution, was released in May 1997 by CMC International Records. Along with Mark Slaughter, Strum wrote all the album's songs in Nashville, Tennessee, where the band's lead singer relocated in 1996. The band then embarked on a two-month tour to promote the album.

At the time, Revolution showcased the band's ambition to be at the forefront of rock technology, it was one of the first albums to be an enhanced CD, allowing audiences not only to listen to the music, but also to watch it via CD-Rom. Dana Strum saw this as "the wave of the future" and believed that it was the logical next step in "the marriage of music, computers and video."

Critics noted that Revolution had a different sound from the band's previous three albums, with subdued vocals from Mark Slaughter and a range of musical styles. However, despite the album's technological innovation and experimentation with new sound, Slaughter, like many other hard-rock bands, struggled to maintain commercial success amidst the rising popularity of alternative rock music. Despite some airplay on radio stations, the album found it challenging to get support from MTV and radio play.

Despite the challenges, Slaughter continued to tour extensively in an attempt to capture the renewed interest in the hard rock music of the late 1980s and early 1990s. The band opened for Alice Cooper and Mötley Crüe singer Vince Neil on package tours.

==== 1998–1999: Eternal Live and Rock Never Stops tour ====
On February 5, 1998, tragedy struck when Tim Kelly, the guitarist of the band, was involved in a fatal car accident in Arizona. At the time of his death, Slaughter was in the process of compiling tracks for their planned live album for CMC International, and the album they were finishing, Eternal Live, became a tribute to Kelly.

The album, which featured live tracks recorded in late 1997 in Mexico City and Las Vegas, included some of Kelly's last moments on stage. Dana Strum and Mark Slaughter both agreed that using these recordings was the best way to honor Kelly's memory.

Eternal Live contained many of Slaughter's biggest hits, five of the songs were Top 40 radio tracks, and six of them were No.1 MTV video hits, including "Up All Night", "The Wild Life", "Mad About You" and "Fly To The Angels" and was a fitting tribute to the late guitarist.

After Kelly's death, the band members were unsure whether to continue or tour. However, they ultimately decided to recruit Jeff Blando, former guitarist for Left For Dead and a friend of Kelly's, to join the band. Blando had toured with the band the previous summer as a front of house sound technician. "He was just the obvious, logical choice," Strum said of the guitarist who was chosen without an audition.

They rehearsed with Blando in May 1998 and continued their commitment to the Rock Never Stops tour, which began in mid-May and ran through mid-September. The tour, for which Strum came up with the name and concept, was created to showcase bands from the "hair-metal" era, with acts like Whitesnake, Vince Neil, Warrant, and Ratt.

==== 1999–2001: Back To Reality ====
In June 1999, Slaughter released their fifth album, Back to Reality, which marked a return to their signature style of "crunchy lead guitar and ear-piercing vocals". The album was the band's first joint writing effort involving all four members and featured new guitarist Jeff Blando.

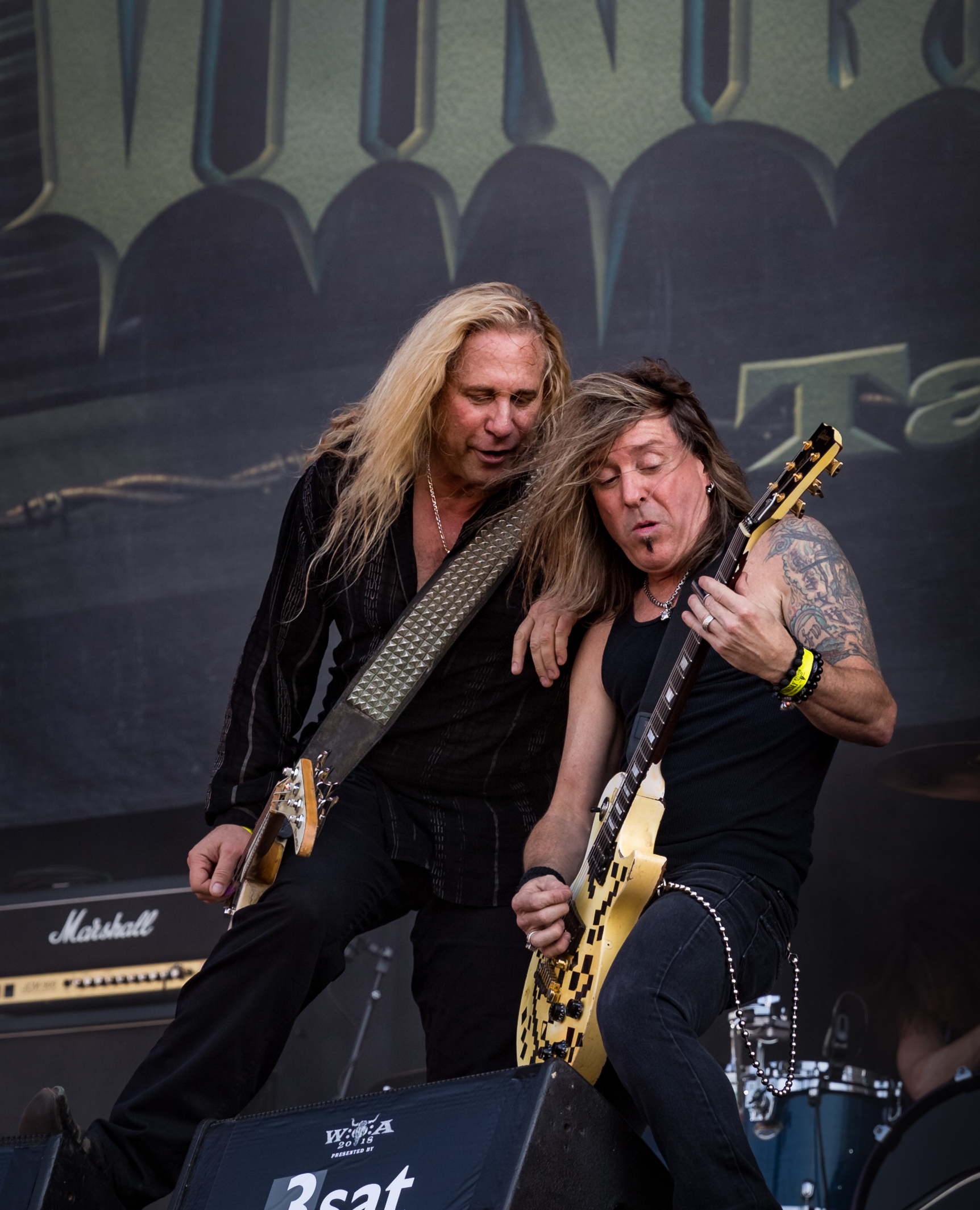
Dana Strum and Jeff Blando on stage in 2018

In a press release for the album, Mark Slaughter and Dana Strum expressed their satisfaction with returning to their "musical roots." In Strum's words, "A lot of bands that started in our time felt the pull to sound like the current trends over the past few years and we were no different." He added, "But now we've made an album for us, not for radio stations or anyone else for that matter."

Back to Reality received positive reviews from music critics and the band embarked on a supporting tour, joining Quiet Riot, Night Ranger and headliner Ted Nugent on the Rock Never Stops Tour. The tour was well-received, with up to 8,000 to 12,000 fans attending the shows. Strum noted the resurgence of hard rock music and positive feelings associated with the genre saying, "The music of all hard rock bands will last the test of time because it has a real positive memory. It brings back great, positive feelings. It's supposed to make you feel good, and that's what it does every night."

The band also received increased media attention, with their new material being played on 60 American rock stations. Strum remarked that it was "five times the amount of airplay we've had in the last four years." In addition, the band made an appearance on a VH-1 special Where Are They Now? and was featured in a major, full-page story in Forbes.

In 2000, Slaughter completed a successful 60-city tour with Poison, Cinderella and Dokken, and in 2001, they took part in The Voices of Metal tour with Vince Neil of Mötley Crüe, Stephen Pearcy's Ratt, and Vixen.

==== 2002 – present ====
Dana Strum has remained active with Slaughter in the last two decades even though they haven't released any new studio material since their album Back To Reality. The band has been touring extensively, mostly in the US, and has taken part in several tours with other classic metal and hard rock groups from the same era. In 2003, Slaughter joined headliner Whitesnake on the annual Rock Never Stops tour, sponsored by VH-1 Classic television. The band has also released DVDs, CDs, and reissued albums.

Slaughter has performed concert dates each year for the past 32 years in all 50 states and different countries. The band has performed at various venues and notable rock festivals such as Rocklahoma, Sweden Rock Festival, M3 Rock Festival, and Rokisland Fest. In 2020, the band took a break from touring due to the COVID-19 pandemic, but in early 2021, they teamed up with Kiss My Wax Records for a limited reissue of their Fear No Evil album on vinyl.

=== 2007–present: Vince Neil band ===
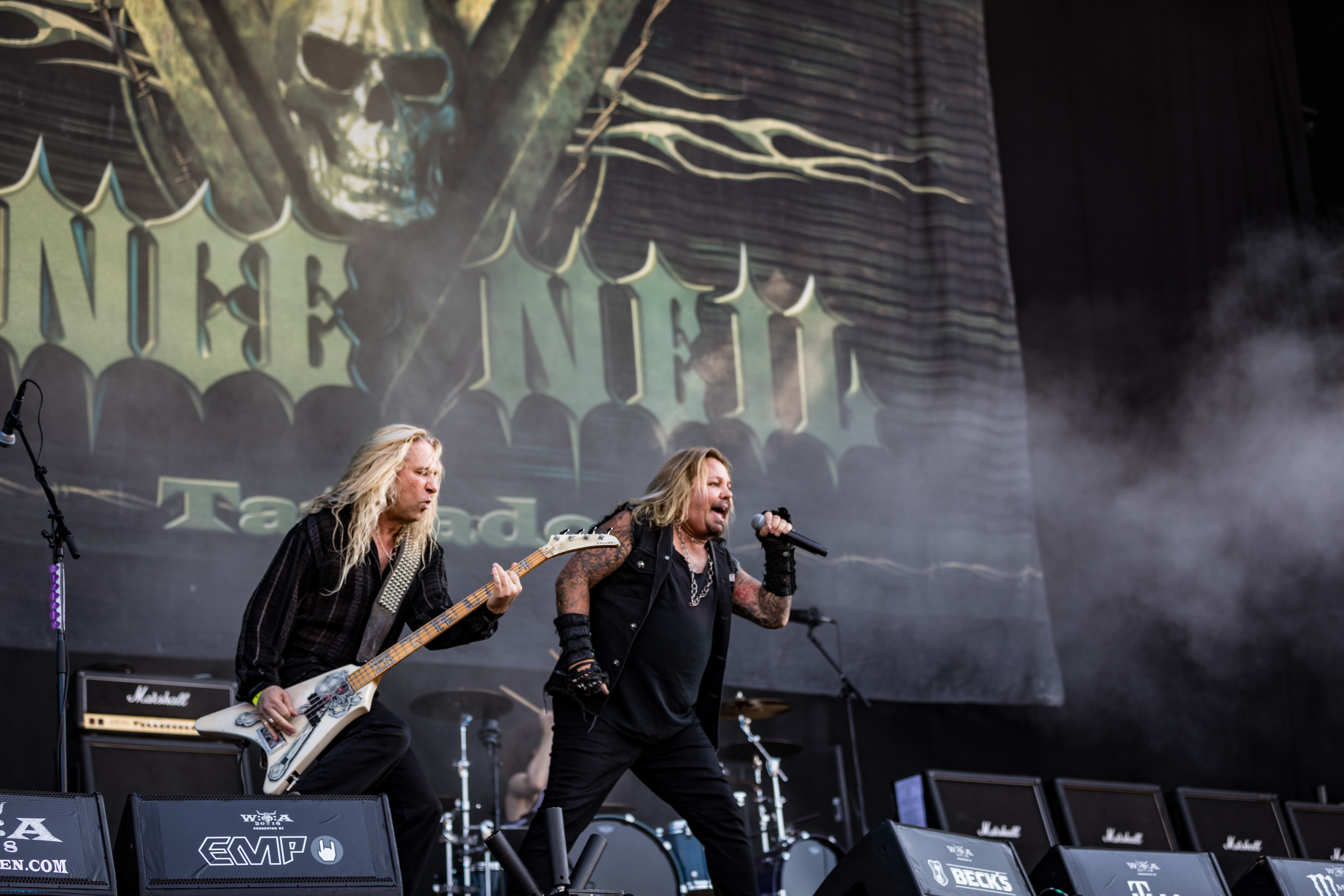
Dana Strum with Vince Neil live in 2018

In 2007, Dana Strum joined Vince Neil's solo band as the bass player. The decision to recruit Strum was made at Jeff Blando's suggestion, who was tasked with assembling a backing band for Neil. Although the idea was initially met with mixed feelings from the Neil's management team, they eventually agreed to the addition of Strum. The band, which includes Strum on bass, Jeff Blando on guitar and Will Hunt on drums, who later was replaced by Zoltan Chaney, has been touring and playing various venues such as casinos, theaters and music festivals ever since. The band's setlist usually includes a mix of Mötley Crüe songs, songs from Vince Neil's solo albums and some covers.

Strum also co-engineered and played bass on Vince Neil's third solo album, Tattoos & Tequila, released via Frontiers Records and Eleven Seven Music in June 2010. Recorded in the winter of 2009, the album included two new songs: "Tattoos & Tequila" that was also released as a music video, and "Another Bad Day", both produced by Marti Frederiksen (Aerosmith, Ozzy Osbourne, Def Leppard), along with classic rock songs that had influenced Vince Neil throughout his musical career. The cover songs were produced by Neil and Jack Blades (Damn Yankees, Night Ranger).

== Talent scout ==
=== Randy Rhoads ===
In 1978, Dana Strum played bass in the band BadAxe and regularly performed on the LA Club Circuit, sharing the stage with the acts such as Van Halen and Quiet Riot. During this time, he frequently watched Quiet Riot's guitar player, Randy Rhoads, perform. In an interview Strum stated that Rhoads' performances were "extraordinary." In late 1978, Strum approached Rhoads and told him that he believed there was something more out there for him.

In early 1979, Ozzy Osbourne was fired from Black Sabbath and had spent months drinking in a room at Le Parc Hotel in West Hollywood. Attempts were made by Jet Records to convince Osbourne to start a new band. In the summer of 1979, Osbourne attended one of Strum's performances at the Starwood and subsequently offered him an invitation to audition for him, which led to the break up of Strum's band.

Strum was ultimately recruited as Osbourne's new bassist and the two spent time driving around LA to audition prospective guitarists. "He had a list with names and addresses, and we would just show up. It was bizarre," Strum said. They were going to people's garages, and apartments, even ran across George Lynch at some point. Strum suggested Rhoads as the ideal candidate for the band, however, Osbourne did not take his suggestion.

In September 1979, Strum contacted Rhoads frequently to persuade him to audition for a new band that Ozzy Osbourne was forming. Rhoads initially expressed disinterest.

When Rhoads arrived at the studio with his old Gibson practice amp, his old six-band equalizer and his Les Paul guitar, Ozzy was stoned and fell asleep. However, Dana Strum, who had booked the studio time and convinced Rhoads to come down to play despite his lack of interest in Black Sabbath, was determined not to let this opportunity pass. He woke Osbourne up, pulled him into a dimly lit control room and made him listen to Rhoads' playing. Initially resistant, Osbourne was willing to "see this Jesus of guitar players." Strum asked Rhoads to play the guitar solo he had performed at the Starwood. Strum said, "It was louder than hell, it sounded huge." Despite Osbourne's initial skepticism, after listening to Rhoads perform the guitar solo, he immediately offered him the job.

With Rhoads still playing, Strum rushed Ozzy back to his hotel and then returned to inform the guitarist of the news. After a brief meeting at Osbourne's hotel the following day, where Rhoads reportedly failed to impress Osbourne by drinking Diet Coke and dressing "very extravagantly" a jam session was held at Mars rehearsal studio. The session included Osbourne, Strum and Rhoads and drummer Frankie Banali who was suggested by Rhoads, and was described by Strum as "a pretty wild band." The group rehearsed for approximately one week until Jet Records abruptly sent Strum and Banali home. In a 1986 interview with Metal Mania, Strum reflected on the disappointment of losing a promising collaboration at such a young age stating that the group had potential, but expressed his confidence that Rhoads' talent would lead to great success in the future.

Randy Rhoads recorded two studio albums with Ozzy Osbourne, Blizzard Of Ozz (1980) and Diary Of A Madman (1981). He also toured with Osbourne's band in Europe and North America. Tragically, Rhoads died in a small plane crash on March 19, 1982, in Leesburg, Florida "He was the best guitarist I'd ever seen," Dana Strum said. "It was Randy's sound – along with Eddie Van Halen's – that changed the whole way the next generation of guitar players thought about music. The ones they tried to emulate but never could."

=== Jake E. Lee ===
In January 1983, Strum's connections within the music industry proved instrumental when Ozzy Osbourne found himself in need of a guitar player to replace Brad Gillis on tour following the tragic death of Randy Rhoads. He once again turned to Strum, who organized auditions for 10 guitar players who were supposed to be the best in L.A. at that time, including Jake E. Lee, lead guitarist for the band Rough Cutt, and George Lynch, the former guitar player for Xciter and the Boyz.

Although Lynch was initially selected to play on the tour, but, in fact, played only during soundchecks, Osbourne was not completely satisfied with his sound, leading him to request additional auditions. Strum arranged for Mitch Perry and Jake E. Lee to audition with him at S.I.R. studios in Los Angeles, with Lee ultimately being offered the position despite showing up late, not knowing the songs as well as he should have and refusing to do an "off-the-cuff solo" for them. Within days, Jake E. Lee joined Osbourne on tour in Europe and became the first guitarist to play on Osbourne's studio album after Randy Rhoads' passing, featuring on the 1983 album Bark At The Moon. George Lynch was reportedly upset by the decision, with Strum later recalling that Ozzy and Sharon Osbourne favored Jake E. Lee's overall vibe and style.

== Style and influences ==
Dana Strum was influenced by various musical styles throughout his life. In a 1990 interview with Circus magazine, Strum stated that he attributed the bluesy feel of much of Slaughter's music to his early exposure to R&B music during his childhood in Pasadena, California, the population of which was known to be highly mixed at the time.

Strum's musical inspirations were further shaped as he grew older, and he cited Black Sabbath and Grand Funk Railroad as two bands he played along with as a teenager. He also recalled attending a Black Sabbath/Captain Beyond concert, which he described as a transformative experience. In 2012, Strum acknowledged Black Sabbath's groundbreaking approach to music, stating that "nobody sounds like these people" and that they were "onto something different". He also singled out the Beatles, saying: "I love music. I love the Beatles. Nobody sounds like them, you know. It's so different, so unique, and so interesting." He credited Paul McCartney and Geezer Butler for inspiring him to pursue the bass guitar, stating that without their influence, he may never have become a bassist himself.

In addition to these influences, Strum also acknowledged the heavy impact of Queen on his musical development. He praised the band's innovative approach to creating music, stating, "They changed my life in high school. I went from being totally enthralled with Black Sabbath to Queen, with those distorted guitar sounds and wild arrangements. They really gave me a whole new enthusiasm for music."

== Equipment ==
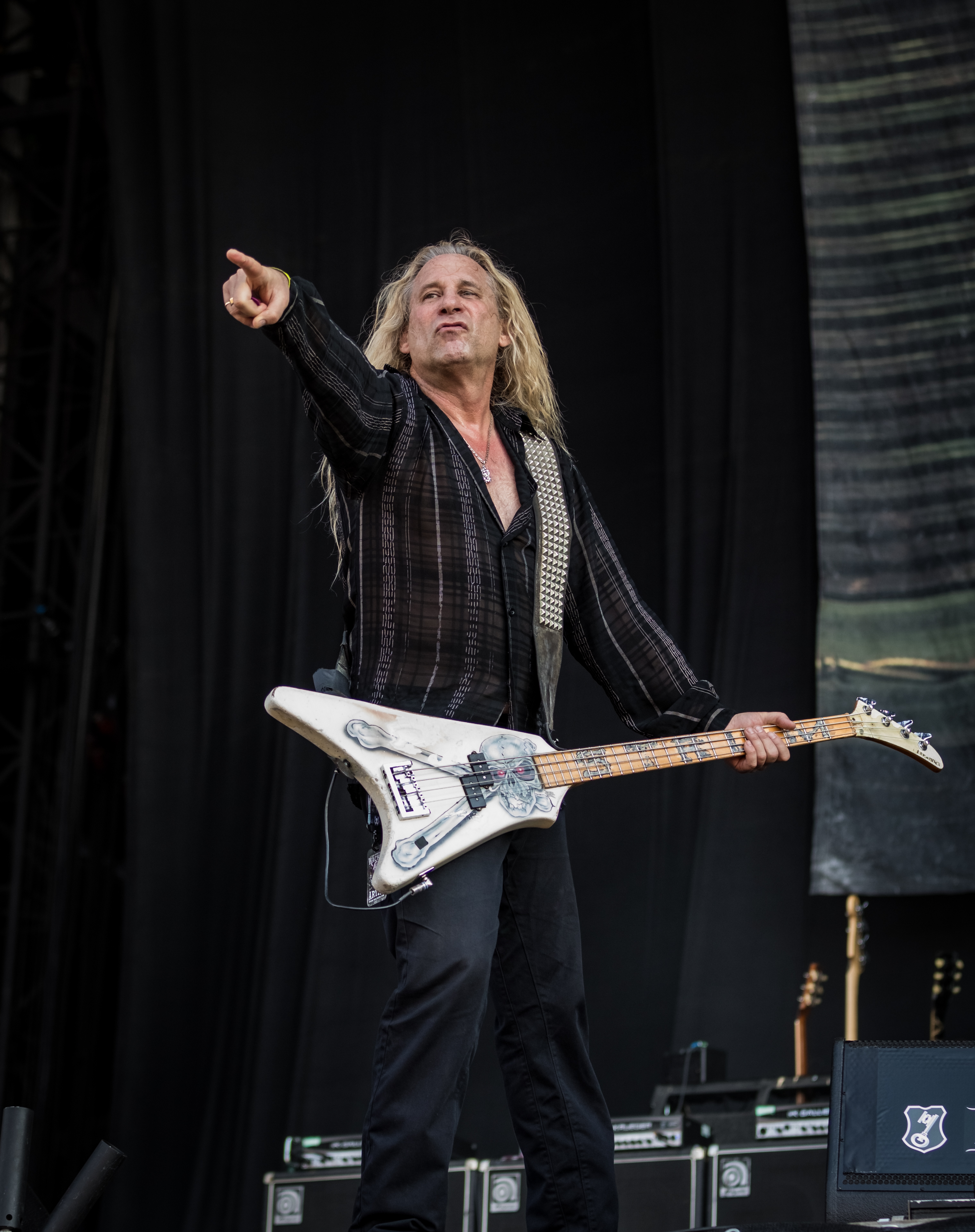
One of Strum's V-shape custom basses, 2018

Throughout his music career, Strum played custom designed V-shape basses manufactured for him by Arbor Guitars. In a 1988 issue of Circus magazine, it was reported that, Strum used a Korean-made Arbor bass that had been modified with a Badass II bridge as part of his music equipment. Strum described the bass as a neck-through-the-body model with a maple fretboard and having a single Seymour Duncan vintage single-coil pickup wired directly into a 500K potentiometer with no tone circuit, stating that it was "a simple bass."

In addition, Strum owned two more Arbors at the time — one with a Jackson passive pickup, the other with an EMG active single coil — and a mid '70s Black Fender Precision that he used in the studio. Strum revealed that the Fender Precision still had its stock pickups, stating that it was the only bass that he had ever recorded with. He also preferred to use Dean Markley .105 gauge strings, a Sunn Coliseum preamp, two Carvin DC-900 power amps and 1330 Carvin bottoms loaded with Electro-Voice 15L speakers. In recent years, Strum has been using a white Bluesman Vintage custom Superbird bass during his live performances.

== Discography ==
| Year | Album title | Band/Artist | Record label | Credits | Ref(s) |
|---|---|---|---|---|---|
| 1976 | BadAxe | BadAxe | Earth Breeze Productions | Bass guitar, co-writer, co-producer | |
| 1977 | She Cried For Me / All You Can Take (Single) | BadAxe | Progrezzive Records | Bass guitar, co-writer, co-producer | |
| 1984 | Rules of Attraction | Rod Falconer | MCA Records | Bass guitar | |
| 1985 | Looks Like Trouble | Danny Spanos | Epic Records | Bass guitar, co-writer | |
| 1986 | Vinnie Vincent Invasion | Vinnie Vincent Invasion | Chrysalis | Bass guitar, co-producer | |
| 1988 | All Systems Go | Vinnie Vincent Invasion | Chrysalis | Bass guitar, co-producer | |
| 2010 | Tattoos & Tequila | Vince Neil | Eleven Seven Music | Bass guitar, co-engineer | |

=== With Slaughter ===
| Year | Album/Single title | Label | Billboard 200 Chart Positions | Certifications | Sales | Credits | Ref(s) |
|---|---|---|---|---|---|---|---|
| 1989 | Stick It To Ya | Chrysalis | 18 | US: 2xPlatinum | US: 2,000,000 | Bass guitar, co-writer, co-producer | |
| 1990 | Stick It Live | Chrysalis | 123 | | | Bass guitar, co-writer, co-producer | |
| 1991 | Shout It Out (Single) | Interscope Records | 40* | | | Bass guitar, co-writer, co-producer | |
| 1992 | The Wild Life | Chrysalis | 8 | US: Gold | US: 500,000 | Bass guitar, co-writer, co-producer | |
| 1995 | Fear No Evil | CMC International | 182 | | | Bass guitar, co-writer, co-producer | |
| 1995 | Mass Slaughter | EMI | — | | | Bass guitar, co-writer, co-producer | |
| 1997 | Revolution | CMC International | — | | | Bass guitar, co-writer, co-producer | |
| 1998 | Eternal Live | CMC International | — | | | Bass guitar, co-writer, co-producer | |
| 1999 | Back To Reality | CMC International | — | | | Bass guitar, co-writer, co-producer | |
"—" denotes items which were not released in that country or failed to chart. "*" denotes Billboard Mainstream Rock chart position

=== Other notable contributions ===
| Year | Band/Artist | Album/Song title | Credits | Ref(s) |
|---|---|---|---|---|
| 1977 | American Dream | Demo | Bass guitar, producer | |
| 1979 | The Millionaires | Demo | Bass guitar, producer | |
| 1981 | Barry Manilow | Demo | Bass guitar | |
| 1984 | Ozzy Osbourne | I'm So Tired: Live & More | Producer | |
| 1985 | SIN | Demo | Producer | |
| 1985 | Burn (Hellion) | Demo | Producer | |
| 1985 | Sweet Savage | Sweet Savage | Producer | |
| 1986 | Detente | Recognize No Authority | Producer | |
| 1987 | Rated-X | Demo | Producer | |
| 1987 | St. Valentine | Demo | Producer | |
| 1988 | Ozzy Osbourne | MTV: Live In Japan | Producer | |
| 1988 | Firehouse (White Heat) | Demo | Producer | |
| 1988 | Kuni | Lookin' For Action | Producer | |
| 1988 | Frehley's Comet | Second Sighting/Dancin' With Danger | Co-writer | |
| 1989 | Brunette | Smash, Crash & Burn | Producer | |
| 1991 | Slaughter | Westwood One Live Show | Producer | |
| 1991 | Kik Tracee | No Rules | Producer, co-writer | |
| 1991 | Randy Jackson's China Rain | Bed Of Nails / Before It's Too Late | Producer | |
| 1993 | Gipsy Kings | Greatest Hits | Producer | |
| 1993 | Sister Whiskey | Liquor & Poker | Producer | |
| 2003 | Dennis Bono | Reflections Of Las Vegas | Producer | |
| 2015 | Erica Chase | Demos / We Can Fly, Paris | Producer | |
| 2018 | Erica Chase | The Letter | Producer | |

=== Soundtracks ===
| Year | Movie/TV series/Video game title | Song title | Band/Artist | Credits | Ref(s) |
|---|---|---|---|---|---|
| 1984 | Up The Creek | Chasin' The Sky | The Beach Boys | Bass Guitar | |
| 1987 | Summer School | Animal | Vinnie Vincent Invasion | Bass Guitar, co-producer | |
| 1988 | A Nightmare On Elm Street IV | Love Kills | Vinnie Vincent Invasion | Bass Guitar, co-producer | |
| 1991 | Bill & Ted's Bogus Journey | Shout It Out | Slaughter | Bass guitar, co-writer, co-producer | |
| 1993 | Beavis and Butt-Head (S.1 E.1) | Real Love | Slaughter | Bass guitar, co-writer, co-producer | |
| 1999 | Final Rinse | Tongue N' Groove | Slaughter | Bass guitar, co-writer, co-producer | |
| 1999 | Films That Suck | American Pie | Slaughter | Bass guitar, co-writer, co-producer | |
| 2004 | Leisure Suit Larry: Magna Cum Laude (Video Game) | Up All Night | Slaughter | Bass guitar, co-writer, co-producer | |
| 2008 | The Wrestler | Dangerous | Slaughter | Bass guitar, co-writer, co-producer | |
| 2010 | Fubar II: Balls To The Wall | Fly To The Angels | Slaughter | Bass guitar, co-writer, co-producer | |

Dana Strum also produced and co-wrote the themes for the syndicated radio programs "Rockline" and "Powercuts".

== Filmography ==
=== Music videos ===
| Year | Title | Band/Artist | Director | Ref(s) |
|---|---|---|---|---|
| 1983 | Lie To You For Your Love | Danny Spanos | | |
| 1986 | Boyz Are Gonna Rock | Vinnie Vincent Invasion | Jeff Stein | |
| 1988 | That Time Of Year | Vinnie Vincent Invasion | Nigel Dick | |
| 1988 | Love Kills | Vinnie Vincent Invasion | Nigel Dick | |
| 1990 | Up All Night | Slaughter | Michael Bay | |
| 1990 | Fly To The Angels | Slaughter | Charles Randazzo | |
| 1990 | Spend My Life | Slaughter | Charles Randazzo | |
| 1991 | Shout It Out | Slaughter | Charles Randazzo | |
| 1991 | Mad About You | Slaughter | Charles Randazzo | |
| 1992 | Real Love | Slaughter | Charles Randazzo | |
| 1992 | The Wild Life | Slaughter | Tom Calabreze | |
| 1992 | Days Gone By | Slaughter | Charles Randazzo | |
| 1995 | Searchin' | Slaughter | Charles Randazzo | |
| 2010 | Tattoos & Tequila | Vince Neil | | |
| 2019 | Vultures In The Sky | Detente | Josh Noyes | |

=== Documentaries, TV series, and other appearances ===
| Year | Title | Role | Certifications | Sales | Ref(s) |
|---|---|---|---|---|---|
| 1990 | Slaughter: From The Beginning (Documentary) | Himself | US: Gold | US: 500,000 | |
| 1990 | Slaughter: Metalhead Video Magazine (Volume 2) | Himself | | | |
| 1991 | Slaughter: MTV: Unplugged | Himself | | | |
| 1991 | Slaughter: Up All Night (TV series) | Himself | | | |
| 1992 | Dana Strum: Bass Essentials. Star Licks Master Sessions (Instructional video) | Himself | | | |
| 1992 | Slaughter: The Wild Life (Documentary) | Himself | US: Gold | US: 500,000 | |
| 1997 | Slaughter: Live At The Hard Rock | Himself | | | |
| 1998 | VH1: My Generation | Himself | | | |
| 2002 | VH-1: Where Are They Now (S.3.E.10) | Himself | | | |
| 2006 | VH1 Metal Mania: Stripped Across America Live! | Himself | | | |
| 2011 | Rockin the Red Carpet (TV special) | Himself | | | |
| 2014 | Quiet Riot: Well Now You're Here, There's No Way Back (Documentary) | Himself | | | |
| 2014 | War of Rock (TV series) | Himself | | | |
| 2022 | Randy Rhoads: Reflections of a Guitar Icon (Documentary) | Himself | | | |
| 2002 | Mötley Crüe's Vince Neil: My Story (Documentary) | Himself | | | |

Strum is often falsely credited as the guitar store clerk in the movie Wayne's World (1992). In 1993, in Circus magazine he affirmed: "Although I've been told there is an amazing resemblance, the guy in the movie is definitely not me. When they were filming that movie, I was submerged in the studio recording The Wild Life."
