= James House (1989 album) =

Studio album by James House
- Released: March 20, 1989
- Recorded: 1988
- Genre: Country
- Label: MCA
- Producer: Tony Brown

James House chronology
James House (1983)	James House (1989)	Hard Times for an Honest Man (1990)

James House is the debut studio album by American country music artist James House. It was released in 1989 via MCA Records. Although the album did not chart, its single "Don't Quit Me Now" peaked at No. 25 on Hot Country Songs.

== Critical reception ==
Jack Hurst of The Chicago Tribune gave the album three stars out of four, saying that "Most of this record is very rhythmic, with lyrics tending toward the simple but eloquent."

== Track listing ==
No.	Title	Writer(s)	Length
1.	"Don't Quit Me Now"	James House, Wendy Waldman	2:46
2.	"It's Cruel"	House, Craig Karp	3:00
3.	"Hard Times for an Honest Man"	House, Rick Serratte	4:21
4.	"Under the Harvest Moon"	House, Allen Shamblin	3:38
5.	"Never Until Now"	House, Shamblin	3:00
6.	"O What a Thrill"	Jesse Winchester	3:06
7.	"Lucinda"	Waldman, Jim Photoglo, Harry Stinson	2:43
8.	"That'll Be the Last Thing"	House, Karp, Dave Gibson	2:40
9.	"Call It in the Air"	House, Walt Aldridge	3:14
10.	"Born Ready"	Gibson, Shamblin	2:38

== Personnel ==
As listed on Discogs.

- Richard Bennett — acoustic guitar
- Chris Camp — electric guitar
- Paul Franklin — steel guitar, Pedabro
- Vince Gill — background vocals
- Glen D. Hardin — piano
- James House — lead vocals, background vocals, acoustic guitar
- David Hungate — bass guitar
- Mac McAnally — background vocals
- Steuart Smith — electric guitar
- Harry Stinson — drums, background vocals
