= Jeff Blando =

American guitarist (born 1964)

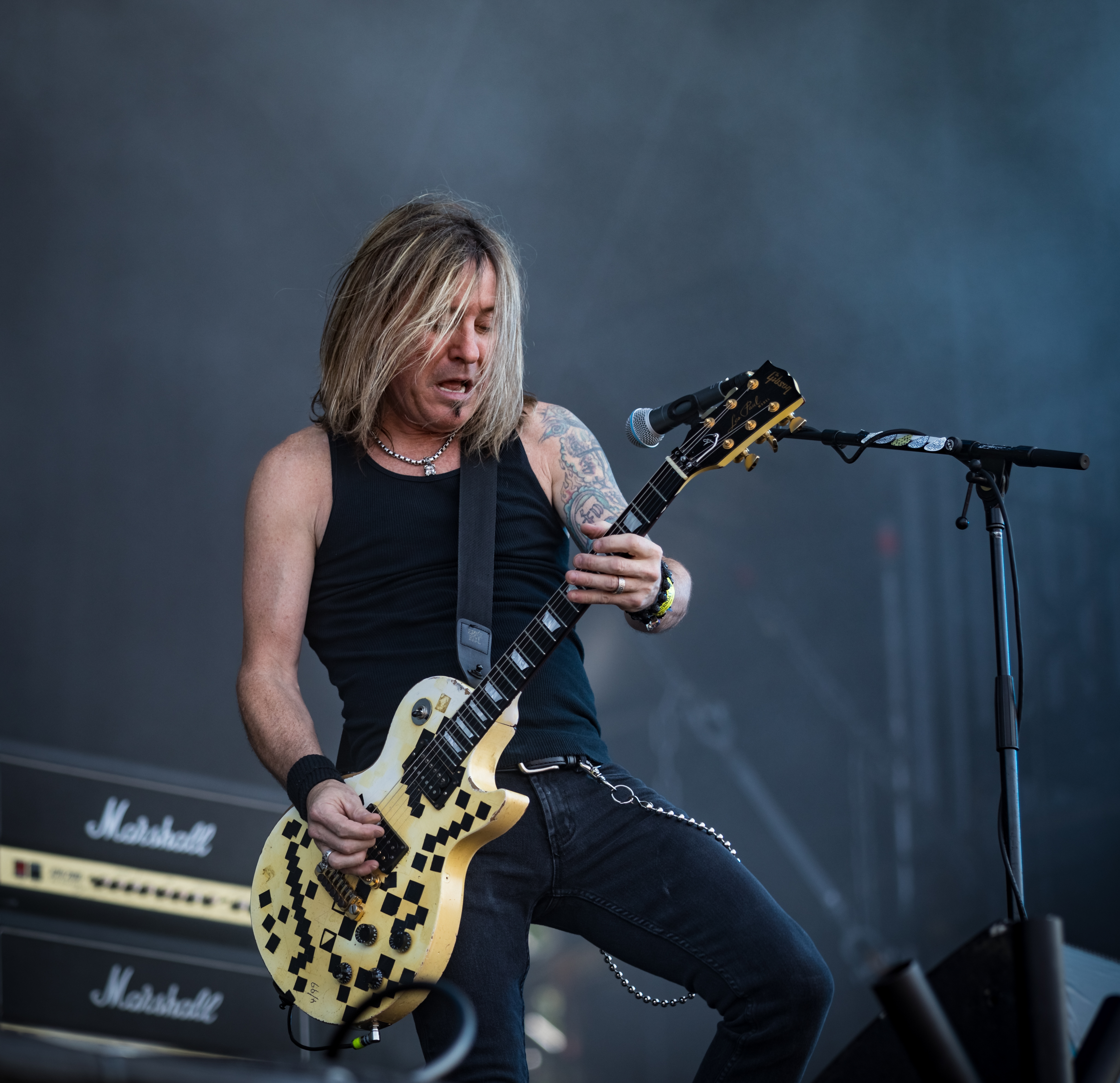
- Blando with Vince Neil - Wacken Open Air 2018

Background information
- Born: Jeff Bland; December 6, 1964 (age 61); Flint, Michigan, U S.
- Genres: Rock; hard rock; glam metal; heavy metal
- Occupations: Singer, songwriter, musician
- Instruments: Guitar, vocals
- Years active: 1998–present
- Website: slaughterusa.com

Jeff "Blando" Bland (born December 6, 1964, in Flint, Michigan) is an American guitarist and singer who played for Michigan-based cover band, KODY LEE, Left For Dead and Saigon Kick. He is currently the lead guitarist for Slaughter and Vince Neil and has been in Dokken's George Lynch's Lynchmob/George Lynch Band as its lead vocalist and 2nd guitarist singing both Dokken and Lynchmob originals Live.

He has played with Mötley Crüe singer Vince Neil, both with his former Saigon Kick touring bandmate Phil Varone, and with his Slaughter bandmate Dana Strum.

== Biography ==
Jeff Bland (BLANDO) was born in Flint, Michigan He joined Slaughter in 1998 as Tim Kelly's replacement after touring as their front-of-house sound technician.

Jeff also had a cover project CRASH that played bike rallies for RJ Reynolds (CAMEL CO.) in Daytona Beach for the past 12 years. The band consists of Blando (lead vocals/guitar), Will Hunt (drums) and Paul Drennan (bass). Blando is currently touring with Vince Neil as guitarist and musical director as well as working with Slaughter. Jeff finished recording & co-engineering the Vince Neil release Tattoos & Tequila that was released on May 5, 2010. Also Blando has a three piece group called BLANDINI featuring Blando on Guitars & Lead Vocals, Zoltan Chaney on Drums & Pedro Sison on Bass.

He is also a motorcycle enthusiast, and owns one motorcycle having been built and customized by Count's Kustoms of Las Vegas.

== Discography ==
=== With Left For Dead ===
- Beatings From Orlando (1995)

=== With Slaughter ===
- Back to Reality (1999)

=== With Crash ===
- Live From Daytona (2001)

=== With Vince Neil ===
- Tattoos & Tequila (2010)
