= Fly to the Angels =

1990 single by Slaughter

Single by Slaughter

from the album Stick It to Ya
- Released: July 14, 1990
- Recorded: 1989
- Genre: Glam metal
- Length: 5:05
- Label: Chrysalis
- Songwriters: Dana Strum; Mark Slaughter
- Producers: Dana Strum; Mark Slaughter

Slaughter singles chronology
"Up All Night" (1990)	"Fly to the Angels" (1990)	"Spend My Life" (1990)

Music video
- "Fly to the Angels" on YouTube

"Fly to the Angels" is a power ballad by American glam metal band Slaughter.

== Charts ==
Chart (1990–1991)	Peak position
Australia (ARIA)	140
UK Singles (OCC)	55
US Billboard Hot 100	19
US Mainstream Rock (Billboard)	15
