= Little by Little (James House song) =

Single by James House

from the album Days Gone By
- B-side: "Take Me Away"
- Released: November 26, 1994
- Genre: Country
- Length: 4:18
- Label: Epic
- Songwriter(s): James House, Rick Bowles
- Producer(s): Don Cook

James House singles chronology
"A Real Good Way to Wind Up Lonesome" (1994)	"Little by Little" (1994)	"This Is Me Missing You" (1995)

"Little by Little" is a song co-written and recorded by American country music artist James House. It was released in November 1994 as the second single from the album Days Gone By. The song reached #25 on the Billboard Hot Country Singles & Tracks chart. The song was written by House and Rick Bowles.

== Content ==
The song is about a man who is getting over a failed relationship "little by little".

== Critical reception ==
A review of the song in Billboard was favorable, comparing House's vocal delivery to Raul Malo while praising the "sonic punch" of the production.

== Chart performance ==
Chart (1994–1995)	Peak position
US Hot Country Songs (Billboard)	25
Canadian RPM Country Tracks	27
