= This Is Me Missing You =

Single by James House

from the album Days Gone By
- B-side: "Take Me Away"
- Released: April 17, 1995
- Genre: Country
- Length: 3:28
- Label: Epic
- Songwriters: James House; Monty Powell; Debi Cochran
- Producer: Don Cook

James House singles chronology
"Little by Little" (1995)	"This Is Me Missing You" (1995)	"Anything for Love" (1995)

"This Is Me Missing You" is a song co-written and recorded by American country music artist James House. It was released in April 1995 as the third single from his album Days Gone By. The song reached number 6 on the Billboard Hot Country Singles & Tracks chart in August 1995. House wrote this song with Debi Cochran and Monty Powell.

== Critical reception ==
Deborah Evans Price, of Billboard magazine reviewed the song favorably, saying that House "has a knack for packing emotion into every syllable of a lyric."

== Music video ==
The theme of the video, directed by Steven Goldmann, is American soldiers keeping in contact with their families in their respective origins. The video was filmed in Fort Campbell, Kentucky and also uses stock footage of troops returning to base from the Gulf War.

== Chart performance ==
"This Is Me Missing You" debuted at number 70 on the U.S. Billboard Hot Country Singles & Tracks for the week of April 29, 1995.

Chart (1995)	Peak position
Canada Country Singles (RPM)	10
US Hot Country Songs (Billboard)	6

=== Year-end charts ===
Chart (1995)	Position
US Country Songs (Billboard)	64
