= Glen Wexler =

American photographer

- Born: Glen Wexler; Palm Springs, California, United States
- Education: Humboldt State University, Art Center College of Design

Glen Wexler is an American photographer who is best known for his elaborately staged digital photocompositions of improbable situations.

== Biography ==
Wexler was born in Palm Springs, California. His father, Donald Wexler FAIA, is a noted mid-century modern architect and innovator of pre-fab steel housing design.

Wexler originally studied fine art photography at Humboldt State University (1973–1975), in Arcata, California under Thomas Knight. He transferred to Art Center College of Design, in Pasadena, California in 1976. He left school in 1978 to pursue opportunities to create album covers.

Wexler married actress Tamara Taylor (Days of Our Lives and Young and the Restless) in 1984. They have two children, Jenna and Ian.

== Career ==
=== Digital photography ===
Wexler was among the first artists to adopt digital image editing technology as a tool in the creative process. During 1987 Wexler was introduced to digital imaging technology by Tony Redhead, who in 1986 founded Electric Paint, the first U.S. company to use digital imaging technology and a Quantel Paintbox to create digital transparencies for print. During 1992 Glen Wexler Studio established in-house digital imaging using Apple Inc. computers, and began employing full-time digital artists to assist with the retouching and photocomposition of Wexler's projects.

Wexler has lectured at the Seybold Conferences in New York and San Francisco, the PhotoPlus Expos in New York and Los Angeles, and at colleges in the United States. In 1996 Wexler was the founding chair of the Advertising Photographers of America National Digital Committee, which was created to help educate professional photographers and the advertising community of the evolving impact of digital imaging technology on the creation and delivery of advertising photography.

=== Album covers ===
Wexler first album cover commission was to photograph the Brothers Johnson (Blam! 1978), for Quincy Jones Productions and A&M Records.

Album cover projects include, Van Halen (Balance), Black Sabbath (Reunion), Rush (Hold Your Fire), ZZ Top (Greatest Hits), Missing Persons (Spring Session M), Slaughter (Stick It to Ya), Chuck Wild (11 Liquid Mind albums) and Chaka Khan (Naughty). Wexler also created images for Michael Jackson, Kiss, Yes, Kansas, Whitesnake, The Black Crowes, Boston, Steve Miller Band, Peter Frampton, Bob Weir, Chick Corea, Herbie Hancock, Heaven and Earth and many others.

Wexler created a fantasy album cover for the Rock and Roll Hall of Fame and Museum exhibition "The Greatest Album Covers That Never Were", which toured nationally from 2003 to 2006. Wexler was invited to lecture about album cover work at the Rock and Roll Hall of Fame and Museum along with designer John Van Hamersveld in June 2003.

In the fall of 2006, Wexler's album cover artwork was featured at the National Academy of Recording Arts and Sciences' (NARAS) "The Art Of Music" event in Los Angeles.

=== Advertising commissions ===
During the mid-1980s Wexler images began working with advertising clients. Early advertising clients included advertising executive Ed McCabe who commissioned Wexler to work on the 1992 updates to the Maxell campaign. Wexler's signature style of "improbable realities" attracted international commissions from companies including Pioneer Electronics, Acura, Sony, Adobe Systems, Qwest Communications, Microsoft, Intel, Coca-Cola, Pepsi, POM Wonderful, Fiji Water, Bombardier, Paggio, Jeep, Toyota, Yamaha and Warner Bros. Pictures.

=== Photographic logo treatments ===
Wexler photographic projects extended to corporate logo development and treatments for entertainment companies, album covers, film titles and book covers. Logo projects include the 1987 Geffen "Power Surge" logo to promote Aerosmith, Guns N' Roses and Whitesnake, the Van Halen album cover "For Unlawful Carnal Knowledge", the 75th anniversary redesign of the Universal Pictures logo, and the development of the logo design for the Star Wars Trilogy Special Edition (1997). Wexler's photographic logo of the Batman Forever question mark logo received a first-place trophy at the 1996 The Hollywood Reporter Key Art Awards.

=== Editorial assignments ===
During 1999 Wexler began creating feature photo-illustrations for Time magazine. Wexler received the 2003 Photojournalism of the Year award from the International Photography Awards, and a first place Best of Photojournalism 2004 award from the National Press Photographers Association (NPPA). Wexler photographed stem cell scientist James Thomson for the August 20, 2001, cover of Time.

=== Solo exhibitions ===
==== Altered realities ====
The Art Institute of Atlanta, Atlanta, Georgia (2001) Sponsored by Epson America, the exhibition featured large scale-prints made on a beta Epson 10000 inkjet printer. The Epson 10000 was the first wide-format printer from Epson, and used archival pigmented inks to produce fine art prints.

==== 25:25 ====
Farmani Gallery, West Hollywood, California (2005) A 25-year retrospective featuring one image selected per year from 1980 through 2004. A limited-edition of 1000 case bound books were published with a foreword by Tim Wride, curator of photography, Los Angeles County Museum of Art (LACMA). Wride states, "Wexler's pictorial constancy as a risk taker and his deftness as a problem solver are the characteristics that distinguish his work and make his images both meaningful and memorable."

==== The Secret Life of Cows ====
Track 16 Gallery, Bergamot Station, Santa Monica, California (2007) An exhibition of large-scale surrealistic images depicting cows as superheroes and secret agents attempting to defend their species from human consumption. Photography gallerist, G Ray Hawkins states, "The same way that Yves Tanguy, Max Ernst and Marcel Duchamp created nonsensical narration and thoroughly enjoyed successfully pulling our legs, photographers can now cut and paste their ideas the same way painters cut and paste ideas from their imagination to canvas, all for the purpose of creating a narrative and telling a story. This is a cohesive body of work. Glen with his surrealist attitude is really having fun with us." The exhibition receive front-page feature coverage in the arts and entertainment section of the July 7, 2007 Los Angeles Times.

==== Fantastic Voyage ====
ArcLight Cinemas, Hollywood, California (2008) An exhibition of 33 large-scale pop culture images.

==== Metal Shop ====
ArcLight Cinemas, Sherman Oaks, California (2008) An exhibition of album cover art. Michael Ochs, music archivist, curator, and author states: "Glen Wexler doesn't just create rock and roll album covers, he is rock and roll – in the best sense of the term. His album covers rock in their lyrical depiction and expansion of musical moments. He captures the essence of the artist and then wails with his own solo, creating a new entity that actually stands on its own."

=== Books ===
==== 25:25 (2005) ====
Foreword by Tim Wride, curator of photography, Los Angeles County Museum of Art (LACMA)
Introduction by Beth Luce (reprinted from Photo Media cover story Fall 2004)
Self-published case bound monograph, limited edition of 1000.

==== The Secret Life of Cows (2007) ====
Foreword by Eric Idle (Monty Python/Spamalot)
Published by: PQ Publishers
Co-published by:
Andrews McMeel Publishing (USA)
Simon & Schuster (UK)
Rolf Heyne (Germany, Austria, Switzerland)
Hachette Livre (New Zealand and Australia)

Shutterbug announces that "The Secret Life of Cows" is the "best digital imaging book of 2007"

==== The '80s Portrait Sessions (2019) ====
Foreword by Billy Gibbons (ZZ Top)
Published by: Dark Spring Press

== Articles and external links ==
- Communication Arts (August 1999)
- Apple.com Pro Stories "Bovine Fancies" (March 2007)
- AltPick.com Artist Spotlight (October 2005)
- After Capture (January 2008)
- Artist Interviews Magazine (November 2005)
- Photo Media "No Impossible Image: The Artistry of Glen Wexler" (Fall 2004)
- Stern (Germany, November 2006)
- ZOOM (Italy, Jan-Feb 2006)
- photoshop.com "Spotlights: Glen Wexler"
