= James House (singer) =

American singer-songwriter

- Born: James Andrew House; March 22, 1955 (age 71)
- Origin: Sacramento, California, U.S.
- Genre: Country
- Occupation: Singer-songwriter
- Instruments: Vocals; acoustic guitar
- Years active: 1983–present
- Labels: Atlantic; MCA; Epic; Friday; Dream On

James Andrew House (born March 22, 1955) is an American country music artist. Originally a member of a group called the House Band, he recorded a solo rock album in 1983 on Atlantic Records before he began his country music career in 1989 on MCA Records, recording two albums for that label. He later penned singles for Diamond Rio and Dwight Yoakam, before finding another record deal on Epic Records in 1994. That year, he charted two Top 40 singles on the Billboard country chart, including the Top 10 hit "This Is Me Missing You".

== Biography ==
James House's musical career began in a band called the House Band, which was signed first to Warner Bros. Records and later to Atlantic Records. In addition, House served as vocal coach for Dustin Hoffman on the movie Ishtar. In 1983, House recorded a rock album for Atlantic.

House later moved to Nashville and signed as a solo artist on MCA Nashville in 1989. On that label, he recorded two albums: James House and Hard Times for an Honest Man. The former accounted for "Don't Quit Me Now", a number 25 on the country charts, while the latter produced no Top 40 hits. House wrote seven of the ten songs on his first album.

In 1990, House was shortlisted for the Academy of Country Music Award for New Male Artist of the Year.

After exiting MCA, he co-wrote "Ain't That Lonely Yet" for Dwight Yoakam and "In a Week or Two" by Diamond Rio, both of which peaked at number 2 on the Hot Country Singles & Tracks chart in the early 1990s. By 1994, House had signed to Epic Records. His first album for that label, Days Gone By, was released that year, producing his highest-charting single in the top 10 "This Is Me Missing You". The album's title track, while not a single, was featured in the soundtrack for the movie The Cowboy Way. In addition, the album featured collaborations with Raul Malo, Trisha Yearwood and Nikki Nelson.

Although House never entered Top 40 on the country music charts again after "This Is Me Missing You", he made an appearance on The Beach Boys' album Stars and Stripes Vol. 1, which featured re-recordings of Beach Boys songs with country music artists. He also continued to write songs for other artists. In late 1997, Martina McBride reached the top of the country charts with "A Broken Wing", which House co-wrote. House also contributed three songs to Steve Holy's debut album Blue Moon. He also co-wrote six songs on Steve Azar's 2009 album Slide On Over Here, on which he also played acoustic guitar, percussion and sang backing vocals. In 2012, House co-wrote The Mavericks' single "Born to Be Blue".

In 2012, House formed the duo Troubadour Kings with John Brannen. Their debut album, Heartache Town, was released in June 2012.

In 2022, MelodicRock Classics released The L.A. Tapes: Classic Rock Years including his 1983 self-titled debut as well as a second disc featuring soundtrack cuts.

In 2024, James released a musical journey audiobook called "Lost in Laurel Canyon" to Audible, which featured stories and songs about his life. The soundtrack was released digitally in Aug, 2024.

== Discography ==
=== Albums ===
Title	Album details	Peak positions	
Title	Album details	US Country	US Heat
James House	Release date: 1983; Label: Atlantic	—	—
James House	Release date: March 20, 1989; Label: MCA	—	—
Hard Times for an Honest Man	Release date: August 17, 1990; Label: MCA	—	—
Days Gone By	Release date: January 17, 1995; Label: Epic	48	19
Broken Glass Twisted Steel	Release date: April 29, 2014; Label: Victor House	—	—
James House and the Blues Cowboys	Release date: August 3, 2018; Label: Victor House	—	—
Lost In Laurel Canyon	Release date: Sept 6, 2024; Label: James House Records and Tapes		
"—" denotes releases that did not chart

=== Extended plays ===
Title	Album details
Home, Vol. 1	Release date: March 3, 2009; Label: Dream On

=== Singles ===
==== As lead artist ====
Year	Single	Peak positions		Album
Year	Single	US Country	CAN Country	Album
1983	"Steal Your Love Away"	—	—	James House (Atlantic)
1989	"Don't Quit Me Now"	25	—	James House (MCA)
1989	"That'll Be the Last Thing"	52	78	James House (MCA)
1989	"Hard Times for an Honest Man"	48	69	Hard Times for an Honest Man
1990	"Southern Belles"	— (Note: "Southern Belles" did not chart on Hot Country Songs, but peaked at No. 10 on Hot Country Radio Breakouts.)	76	Hard Times for an Honest Man
1990	"You Just Get Better All the Time"	60	—	Hard Times for an Honest Man
1994	"A Real Good Way to Wind Up Lonesome"	52	79	Days Gone By
1995	"Little by Little"	25	27	Days Gone By
1995	"This Is Me Missing You"	6	10	Days Gone By
1995	"Anything for Love"	49	33	Days Gone By
1996	"Until You Set Me Free"	—	90	Days Gone By
2009	"I Love You Man"	—	—	Non-album single
2014	"Every Time It Rains"	—	—	Broken Glass Twisted Steel
2024	"What Do You Say"	—	—	Lost In Laurel Canyon
"—" denotes releases that did not chart

==== As featured artist ====
Year	Single	Peak positions		Album
Year	Single	US Country	CAN Country	Album
1996	"Little Deuce Coupe" (The Beach Boys featuring James House)	69	41	Stars and Stripes Vol. 1

=== Music videos ===
Year	Video	Director
1989	"Hard Times for an Honest Man"	Bud Schaetzle
1990	"You Just Get Better All the Time"	not available
1994	"A Real Good Way to Wind Up Lonesome"	Matti Leshem
1995	"Little by Little"	Matti Leshem
1995	"This Is Me Missing You"	Steven Goldmann
1995	"Anything for Love"	Steven Goldmann
1996	"Little Deuce Coupe" (with The Beach Boys)	Jim Yukich
2014	"Every Time It Rains"	Marcel
