= Don't Quit Me Now =

Single by James House

from the album James House
- B-side: "Call It in the Air"
- Released: March 25, 1989
- Genre: Country
- Length: 2:50
- Label: MCA
- Songwriter(s): James House, Wendy Waldman
- Producer(s): Tony Brown

James House singles chronology
| "Steal Your Love Away" (1983) | "Don't Quit Me Now" (1989) | "That'll Be the Last Thing" (1989) |

"Don't Quit Me Now" is a song co-written and recorded by American country music artist James House. It was released in March 1989 as the first single from the album James House. It reached No. 25 on the Billboard Hot Country Singles & Tracks chart. The song was written by House and Wendy Waldman.

== Content ==
The song is about a father pleading his partner not to leave him.

== Chart performance ==
| Chart (1989) | Peak position |
|---|---|
| US Hot Country Songs (Billboard) | 25 |
