= Rock Never Stops Tour =

American concert tour series

Rock Never Stops was a U.S. rock tour that featured various rock groups of the 1970s, 1980s, and 1990s. The tour started in 1997.

== Tour lineup ==
The tour's lineup has shifted from year to year.

=== 1997 ===
- Alice Cooper
- Dokken
- Slaughter
- Warrant

=== 1998 ===
- Quiet Riot
- Warrant
- L.A. Guns
- Slaughter
- FireHouse

Hosted by Dee Snider

=== 1999 ===
- Ted Nugent
- Night Ranger
- Quiet Riot
- Slaughter

=== 2000 ===
- Sebastian Bach

=== 2001 ===
- Sebastian Bach

=== 2002 ===
- Tesla
- Vince Neil
- Jackyl
- Skid Row

=== 2003 ===
- Whitesnake
- Warrant
- Kip Winger
- Slaughter

=== 2004 ===
- Vince Neil
- Ratt
- Slaughter

=== 2005 ===
- Cinderella
- Quiet Riot
- Ratt
- FireHouse

=== 2012 ===
- Dokken
- Quiet Riot
- Firehouse
- Y&T
- Trixter

Tour was planned but never took place

== See also ==
- Concert tour
