= Days Gone Bye =

Days Gone Bye may refer to:

- "Days Gone Bye" (The Walking Dead), an episode of The Walking Dead
- "Days Gone Bye" (comics), the first story arc of The Walking Dead comic book series
