= Hard Times for an Honest Man =

Studio album by James House
- Released: August 17, 1990
- Recorded: 1989–90
- Genre: Rockabilly
- Length: 31:59
- Label: MCA
- Producer: Tony Brown

James House chronology
James House (1989)	Hard Times for an Honest Man (1990)	Days Gone By (1995)

Hard Times for an Honest Man is the second album of American country music artist James House. It was released in 1990 via MCA Records. The album includes the singles "Hard Times for an Honest Man", "Southern Belles" and "You Just Get Better All the Time".

Alanna Nash of Entertainment Weekly gave the album an "A", saying that "Backed by smart and stylized playing, House moves through a fast-paced and diverse program of original material that pays homage to his heroes."

== Track listing ==
All songs written by James House and Kostas except as noted.

1. "Southern Belles" 3:27
2. "I Ain't Like That Anymore" 2:56
3. "Because You're Mine" 3:07
4. "I Wanna Be the One" 2:43
5. "Here's to You" 2:59
6. "That's What I Like About You" 2:40 (John Hadley, Kevin Welch, Wally Wilson)
7. "You Didn't See Her" 2:57
8. "You Just Get Better All the Time" 3:29 (Tony Joe White, John Christopher)
9. "Right on Time" 3:09
10. "Hard Times for an Honest Man" 4:22 (House, Rick Seratte)

== Personnel ==
- Lea Jane Berinati — background vocals
- Richard Bennett — acoustic guitar
- Steve Fishell — steel guitar (except "Hard Times for an Honest Man")
- Paul Franklin — steel guitar on "Hard Times for an Honest Man"
- Vince Gill — background vocals
- Glen Hardin — piano
- James House — acoustic guitar, lead vocals, background vocals
- David Hungate — bass guitar on "Hard Times for an Honest Man"
- Kostas — background vocals
- Steve Nathan — synthesizer
- Michael Rhodes — bass guitar (except "Hard Times for an Honest Man")
- Tom Roady — percussion
- Russell Smith — background vocals
- Steuart Smith — electric guitar
- Harry Stinson — drums, background vocals
