= Days Gone By (James House album) =

Studio album by James House
- Released: 1995
- Recorded: 1994
- Genre: Country
- Length: 35:46
- Label: Epic
- Producer: Don Cook

James House chronology
Hard Times for an Honest Man (1990)	Days Gone By (1995)	Broken Glass Twisted Steel (2014)

Days Gone By is the third studio album by American country music artist James House, released in 1995. It was also his only album for the Epic Records label.

The album itself peaked at 48 on the U.S. Billboard Top Country Albums charts, and 19 on Top Heatseekers. Four of its singles entered the Billboard Hot Country Singles & Tracks (now Hot Country Songs) charts: "A Real Good Way to Wind Up Lonesome", "Little by Little", "This Is Me Missing You", and "Anything for Love"; "This Is Me Missing You" was the highest-charting single of his career, peaking at No. 6 in mid-1995. In addition, the album's title track was included in the soundtrack to the 1994 movie The Cowboy Way.

Days Gone By also features guest vocals from Trisha Yearwood, as well as Raul Malo (of The Mavericks) and Nikki Nelson (who was then the lead singer for Highway 101).

== Track listing ==
No.	Title	Writer(s)	Length
1.	"This Is Me Missing You"	James House, Monty Powell, Debi Cochran	3:28
2.	"A Real Good Way to Wind Up Lonesome"	J. House, Dale Dodson, John Jarrard	3:25
3.	"Until You Set Me Free"	J. House, Rafe Van Hoy	3:40
4.	"Anything for Love"	J. House, Phil Barnhart, Sam Hogin	3:40
5.	"Little by Little"	J. House, Rick Bowles	4:18
6.	"Only a Fool"	J. House, Van Hoy, Stan Lynch	3:23
7.	"Silence Makes a Lonesome Sound"	J. House, Barnhart, Hogin	2:54
8.	"Days Gone By"	J. House, Holly House, Dean Miller	4:03
9.	"Take Me Away"	J. House, Wally Wilson	2:57
10.	"That's Something (You Don't See Every Day)"	J. House, Allen Shamblin	3:58

== Personnel ==
=== The House Band ===
- John Bohlinger – electric guitar
- Jeanie Cioff – fiddle, background vocals
- Steve Cox – keyboards
- Craig Flynn – bass guitar, background vocals
- James House – lead vocals, background vocals, acoustic guitar
- Kenneth Smith – drums

=== Additional musicians ===
- Bruce Bouton – pedal steel guitar, slide guitar
- Dennis Burnside – piano, Hammond organ
- Mark Casstevens – acoustic guitar, mandolin
- Rob Hajacos – fiddle, "electric hoedown tools"
- David Hungate – bass guitar
- John Barlow Jarvis – piano, Hammond organ
- Raul Malo – background vocals on "Take Me Away"
- Brent Mason – electric guitar
- Nikki Nelson – background vocals on "Only a Fool"
- John Wesley Ryles – background vocals
- John Willis – 12-string guitar, baritone guitar, electric guitar
- Dennis Wilson – background vocals
- Lonnie Wilson – drums, percussion
- Glenn Worf – bass guitar, upright bass
- Trisha Yearwood – background vocals on "Anything for Love"

Strings on "Until You Set Me Free" and "That's Something (You Don't See Every Day)" performed by the Nashville String Machine and arranged by Dennis Burnside.

== Chart performance ==
Chart (1995)	Peak position
U.S. Billboard Top Country Albums	48
U.S. Billboard Top Heatseekers	19
