= CMC International =

American independent record label

CMC International Records
- Parent company: BMG Rights Management; Sanctuary Records Group
- Founded: 1991
- Founder: Bill Cain and Tom Lipsky
- Status: Defunct 2007
- Distributors: Universal Music Group (physical); BMG Rights Management (digital)
- Genre: Heavy metal, hard rock, rock
- Country of origin: US
- Location: Raleigh, North Carolina

CMC International was an American independent record label founded by Bill Cain and Tom Lipsky in 1991, focused mainly on classic rock, and classic heavy metal. The label was the haven of many hard rock, arena rock, thrash metal, glam metal, and AOR artists in the period when all the majors were investing all their financial efforts on grunge and alternative rock acts. In 1995 CMC started a partnership with BMG Entertainment, which in 1999 owned the majority of the company, with founder Tom Lipsky holding a minority stake.

CMC International became a division of Sanctuary Records Group in 2000, with Lipsky becoming president of Sanctuary Records North America. After Universal Music Group acquired Sanctuary in 2007, CMC International ceased to exist. However, due to conditions imposed by the European Commission following UMG's 2012 acquisition of EMI, it sold Sanctuary to BMG Rights Management in 2013 for over €46 million ($71.875 million). Since then, Sanctuary has been distributed globally by Warner Music Group through its ADA division.

Tom Lipsky is currently working as president of Roadrunner Records' Loud & Proud division, managing classic rock bands and artists.

== Notable former artists ==
- Accept
- Annihilator
- Pat Benatar
- Blackthorne
- Bruce Dickinson
- Blue Öyster Cult
- Christopher Cross
- Deep Purple (US)
- Dokken
- Eddie Money
- The Fixx
- Iron Maiden
- Joe Cocker
- Judas Priest
- Justin Hayward
- Kix
- L.A. Guns
- Alexi Lalas
- La Toya Jackson
- Loverboy
- Lynch Mob
- Lynyrd Skynyrd
- Yngwie J. Malmsteen
- Molly Hatchet
- Motörhead
- Night Ranger
- Overkill
- Saigon Kick
- Saxon
- Slaughter
- Soulmotor
- Styx
- 38 Special
- Thin Lizzy
- Toto
- Tyketto
- Vixen
- Warrant
- Widowmaker
- W.A.S.P.
- Yes
