= Slaughter (American band) =

American glam metal band

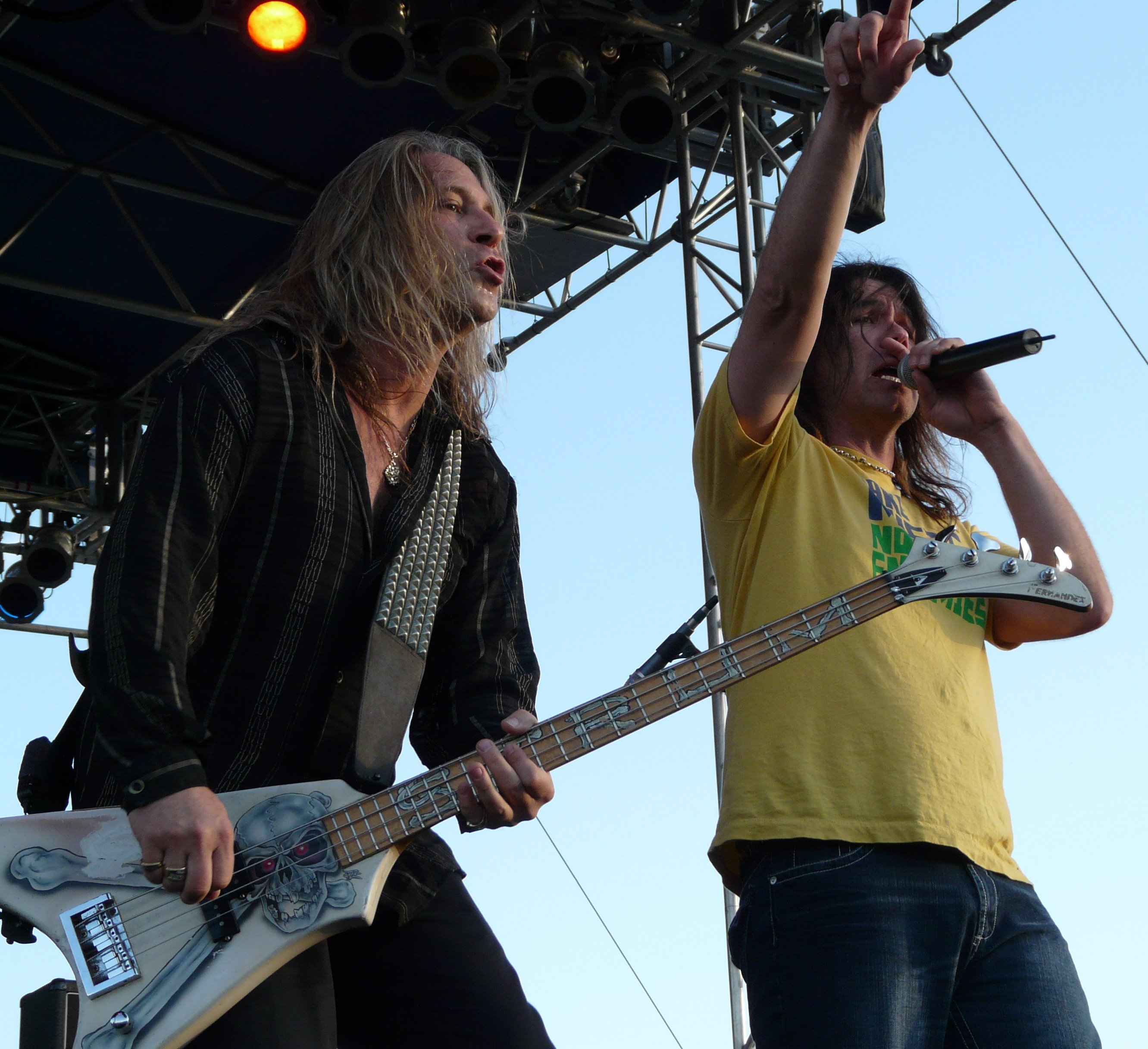
- Slaughter performing on June 21, 2008 in West Fargo, North Dakota

Background information
- Origin: Las Vegas, Nevada, U.S.
- Genres: Glam metal; hard rock
- Years active: 1988–present
- Labels: Chrysalis; CMC International; Victor; Capitol
- Spinoff of: Vinnie Vincent Invasion
- Members: Mark Slaughter; Dana Strum; Jeff "Blando" Bland; Jordan Cannata
- Past members: Tim Kelly; Blas Elias
- Website: slaughterusa.com

Slaughter is an American hard rock band that formed in Las Vegas, Nevada, in 1988. The group was founded by lead vocalist and rhythm guitarist Mark Slaughter and bassist Dana Strum, who previously played together in the band Vinnie Vincent Invasion. The addition of guitarist Tim Kelly and drummer Blas Elias allowed Slaughter to quickly gain attention for their lively performances, catchy hooks, and melodic guitar solos.

Following Tim Kelly's death in a car accident in 1998, Slaughter added Jeff Blando as their new guitarist, who has remained an essential part of the band's lineup ever since. Blando also contributed to the band's most recent studio album.

Slaughter's music was heavily influenced by the hard rock and heavy metal scene of the 1980s, with an aggressive yet melodic sound. To date, Slaughter has released five studio albums, two live albums, and one compilation album. Their debut album Stick It to Ya, released in 1990, has sold over two million copies worldwide and went double platinum, producing hit singles such as "Up All Night" and "Fly to the Angels". Their follow-up album, The Wild Life, has sold over 500,000 copies, receiving a gold certification.

In addition to their commercial success, Slaughter has also received critical acclaim for their music, including winning the American Music Award for Favorite Heavy Metal/Hard Rock New Artist in 1991, beating out other popular hard rock and heavy metal acts of the time.

Slaughter has continued to release new music and tour regularly since the 1990s. Over the years, Slaughter has taken part in a number of festivals, including the Monsters of Rock Cruise, the M3 Rock Festival, and Rocklahoma. They have also played numerous shows and tours throughout the United States and abroad.

In 2013, Dustin Rowles of Uproxx included the band in his list "In Which We Remember 10 Hair Metal Bands So Crappy You’ve Probably Completely Forgotten About Them". By contrast, in 2020, Jeff Mezydlo of Yardbarker included them in his list of "the 20 greatest hair metal bands of all time".

== History ==
Slaughter formed in Las Vegas, Nevada, in late 1988. Previously, lead vocalist Mark Slaughter and bassist Dana Strum had been in Vinnie Vincent Invasion. Vinnie Vincent Invasion's record company, Chrysalis Records, took the $4 million contract away from Vinnie Vincent for exceeding his credit line with the label, and transferred the contract to former members Slaughter and Strum. By 1989, Slaughter and Strum completed the lineup by recruiting lead guitarist Tim Kelly and drummer Blas Elias.

Slaughter's debut album Stick It to Ya had three singles released that hit the Billboard Hot 100: the hit "Fly to the Angels" (US No. 19), and the moderate hits "Up All Night" (US No. 27) and "Spend My Life" (US No. 39). During this time, a song was released from the soundtrack to the film Bill & Ted's Bogus Journey. That song, titled "Shout It Out", was accompanied by a music video but failed to make the US Hot 100.

In 1992, the band released their second album, titled The Wild Life. It reached number eight on the US Billboard Top 200 Album Chart and was certified gold, but did not produce any Top 40 hits on the US Hot 100. The only single to reach the Hot 100 was the first single "Real Love" (US No. 69).

The band planned to record their third album in early 1994. However, in 1993 guitarist Tim Kelly was arrested for charges of drug trafficking, while bassist Dana Strum had a motorcycle accident that injured his playing hand. The delayed album was completed in February 1994 and a video for the planned first single "Searchin'" was filmed. However, following Chrysalis Records absorption into EMI Records, Slaughter was dropped from EMI.

The band subsequently signed with CMC International, a new label at the time that signed many hard rock and metal bands in the face of the new grunge popularity. The label had major distribution through BMG. In 1995, Slaughter released the album Fear No Evil. The album did not have much success in North America, Europe, or much of Asia but performed well in Japan. Guitarist Dave Marshall (ex-Vince Neil band) had to fill in for Kelly at times, due to his legal problems.

Kelly's legal troubles ended and the band committed to their next album. In 1997, Revolution was released. The album featured a more eclectic and psychedelic sound, but failed to make an impact. On February 5, 1998, tragedy struck when guitarist Tim Kelly was killed in an auto accident in the Arizona desert. This deeply affected the group, but they were committed to continue with the band. Dave Marshall briefly performed as a touring guitarist for Slaughter in Japan. In 1998, they hired Jeff Blando as Kelly's replacement and began working on their next album. A live album titled Eternal Live was released featuring some of the band's last performances with Kelly.

In 1999, they released the album Back to Reality, featuring Blando as the new guitarist. Blando was previously in Left For Dead and Saigon Kick. Slaughter continues to play many rock package tours with other acts that saw prominence during the glam era of the 1980s and early 1990s. During the summer of 1999, while on the "Rock Never Stops Tour" (which included Ted Nugent and Night Ranger), Slaughter saw some of their previous singles on compilation albums. The VH-1 album "Power Ballads" included "Fly To The Angels"; "Up All Night" was included on Rhino Records "Hard Hitters". Slaughter also took part in the Summer 2000 "Poison, Cinderella, Dokken and Slaughter" tour.

In 2001, Slaughter was a part of the "Voices of Metal" tour featuring Ratt, Vixen, and Vince Neil of Mötley Crüe. Mark Slaughter and Dana Strum's former Vinnie Vincent Invasion bandmate Bobby Rock played as a touring drummer for Slaughter, filling in for Blas Elias on some shows of the Rock Never Stops Tour. In April 2004, Slaughter released a DVD-A entitled Then and Now that features 12 songs and 50 photos of the band over the years. Slaughter also released a DVD that features all of the music videos and behind the scenes footage during the 2004 season.

On July 13, 2007, Slaughter performed at glam metal festival Rocklahoma. However, Strum and Blando were not present during the band's performance, though they did perform with Vince Neil the following night. At the end of January 2008 Slaughter performed a show at Motley Cruise, a four-day cruise in the Caribbean with Vince Neil, Skid Row, Ratt, Endeverafter, Lynam.

Slaughter continues to tour and in 2017 they are scheduled to appear on the Monsters of Rock cruise and at Rocklahoma along with several other scheduled concerts.

== In other media ==
In "The Graduates", a 1991 episode of the American sitcom Full House, widowed family patriarch Danny Tanner attends a Slaughter concert along with Kirsten, a much younger intern from his workplace with whom he is briefly romantically involved.

== Band members ==
Current members

- Mark Slaughter – lead vocals, rhythm guitar, keyboards, piano, tambourine (1988–present)
- Dana Strum – bass, backing vocals (1988–present)
- Jeff "Blando" Bland – lead guitar, backing vocals (1998–present)
- Jordan Cannata – drums, percussion (2021–present)

Former members

- Blas Elias – drums, percussion, backing vocals (1988–2003, 2019–2021)
- Tim Kelly – lead guitar, backing vocals (1988–1998; his death)

Former touring members

- Dave Marshall – lead guitar, backing vocals (1995, 1998)
- Bobby Rock – drums, percussion (2003–2004)
- Timothy "Timbo" DiDuro – drums, percussion (2004–2011)
- Zoltan Chaney – drums, percussion (2011–2019)
- Will Hunt – drums, percussion (2011–2022)

Timeline

== Discography ==
=== Studio albums ===
Title	Album details	Peak chart positions							Certifications
Title	Album details	CAN	US	AUS	JPN	GER	SWI	UK	Certifications
Stick It to Ya	Released: January 23, 1990; Label: Chrysalis	45	18	130	—	58	32	—	CAN: Platinum; US: 2 X Platinum
The Wild Life	Released: April 21, 1992; Label: Chrysalis	13	8	95	49	—	37	64	CAN: Gold; US: Gold
Fear No Evil	Released: May 2, 1995; Label: CMC	—	182	—	—	—	—	—	
Revolution	Released: May 20, 1997; Label: CMC	—	—	—	—	—	—	—	
Back to Reality	Released: June 29, 1999; Label: CMC	—	—	—	—	—	—	—	
"—" denotes releases that did not chart or were not released in that territory.

=== Live albums ===
- Stick It Live (1990)
- Eternal Live (1998)
- Ecstasy Live 1991 (2022)

=== Compilations ===
- Mass Slaughter: The Best of Slaughter (1995)
- Then and Now (2002)
- 10 Great Songs (2011)

=== Home videos ===
- From the Beginning (1991) (Gold)
- The Wild Life (1992) (Gold)

=== Singles ===
Year	Title	Chart positions			Album
Year	Title	US	US Main Rock	AUS	Album
1990	"Up All Night"	27	21	-	Stick It to Ya
1990	"Fly to the Angels"	19	15	140	Stick It to Ya
1991	"Spend My Life"	39	28	-	Stick It to Ya
1991	"Mad About You"	-	37	-	Stick It to Ya
1991	"Shout It Out"	-	40	-	Bill and Ted's Bogus Journey
1992	"The Wild Life"	-	28	130	The Wild Life
1992	"Real Love"	69	24	-	The Wild Life
1992	"Do Ya Know"	-	-	-	The Wild Life
1992	"Days Gone By"	-	8	-	The Wild Life
1995	"Searchin'"	-	-	-	Fear No Evil
1995	"Hard Times"	-	-	-	Fear No Evil
1995	"Outta My Head"	-	-	-	Fear No Evil
1997	"American Pie"	-	-	-	Revolution
1998	"Fly to the Angels 98"	-	-	-	Eternal Live

== Tours ==
- Hot in the Shade Tour 1990
- Stick it to Ya Tour 1991
- The Wild Life Tour 1992-1993
- Fear No Evil Tour 1995-1996
- Revolution Tour 1997
- Rock Never Stops Tour 1998
- Rock Never Stops Tour 1999
- Power to the People Tour 2000
- Voices of Metal Tour 2001
- Rock Never Stops Tour 2003
- Rock Never Stops Tour 2004
