= Tim Kelly (musician) =

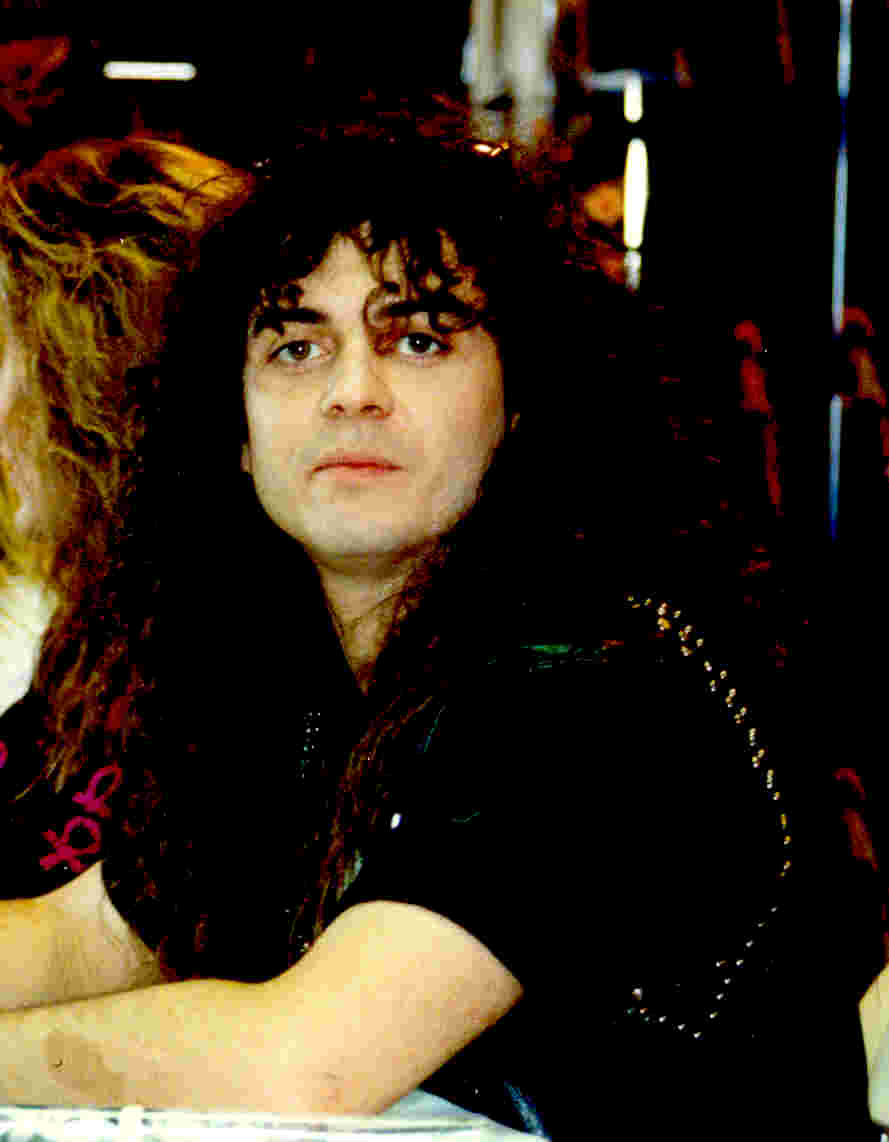
- Kelly signing autographs in 1990

Background information
- Born: Timothy Patrick Kelly; January 13, 1963; Trenton, New Jersey, U.S.
- Died: February 5, 1998 (aged 35) Bagdad, Arizona, U.S.
- Genres: Rock, hard rock, glam metal
- Occupations: Singer, songwriter, musician
- Instruments: Vocals, guitar
- Years active: 1985–1998
- Formerly of: Slaughter
- Website: slaughterusa.com

Timothy Patrick Kelly (January 13, 1963 – February 5, 1998) was an American guitarist for the band Slaughter.

== Career ==
Born in Trenton, New Jersey, Kelly was a self-taught guitar player and began his music career around the sixth grade. He was inspired by other guitarists such as Rick Derringer and Peter Frampton. He played in a few bands during his career which included Hellion, NEWHAVEN, and Allegiance (that was fronted by his brother Bryan Kelly) along with other bands. After no real commercial success with these bands, he was chosen as guitarist for the group Slaughter which was formed in the fall of 1988.

With Slaughter, Kelly had many writing credits. On the first album of the band Stick It to Ya, he wrote and performed an instrumental piece called "Thinking of June" which he dedicated to his sister who died in 1982. In all, Kelly released four studio albums with the band and two live albums, the last of which Eternal Live was released posthumously and includes a pictorial and video tribute to Kelly which was quickly put together by Blas Elias. Tim had been working on some songs, which two bandmates refused to listen to, so he with Blas Elias worked on a separate project from Slaughter before his death.

== Death ==
On February 5, 1998, Kelly was involved in a fatal car accident while traveling on Highway 96 in Arizona. Kelly's vehicle, of which he was the driver, was hit head-on when an 18 wheeler crossed the middle line. Kelly was transported to a Bagdad, Arizona clinic where he was pronounced dead from internal injuries. At the time of the accident, the driver of the 18 wheeler was under the influence of at least three different drugs including amphetamines. He was later sentenced to three years in prison.

Kelly is buried at Saint Ignatius Cemetery in Yardley, Pennsylvania.
