= Blas Elias =

American drummer (born 1967)

- Born: Blas Elias Gomez; August 18, 1967 (age 58)
- Origin: Kenedy, Texas, U.S.
- Genres: Rock; hard rock; glam metal; heavy metal
- Occupations: Musician, actor
- Instruments: Drums, percussion, vocals
- Years active: 1985–present
- Website: slaughterweb.com

Blas Elias (born August 18, 1967) is an American musician and drummer of the glam metal band Slaughter. He also drums for the Las Vegas production of Blue Man Group. Elias has toured with the Trans-Siberian Orchestra since 2017, and has been a rotating cast member of the Las Vegas production show Raiding the Rock Vault. In 2019 he returned to Slaughter as a full-time drummer.

== Biography ==
Blas Elias (née Blas Elias Gomez) is also an actor, having appeared in the movie Rock Star (2001). Elias played drummer Donny Johnson, of the fictional Steel Dragon tribute band, Blood Pollution. The film also featured performances by musicians such as Zakk Wylde, Jason Bonham, Myles Kennedy, Jeff Pilson, Brian Vander Ark, and Nick Catanese.

In 2000, Elias appeared in an instructional drumming video titled "Blas Elias of Slaughter - Drum Magic," for Star Licks Productions.

Elias at one time was endorsed by Ludwig Drums and Sabian Cymbals however neither company currently show him as an endorser. At one time, he had his own Signature series Drumstick Made by Pro Mark Drumsticks. As of 2015 into 2016, he is the drummer for Las Vegas-based band Sin City Sinners with Michael "Doc" Ellis, Joshua Alan, and Scott Griffin. Blas Elias currently plays drums for Pearcy/Demartini, a group consisting of Stephen Pearcy and Warren De Martini from the classic lineup of Ratt, performing all their hits, like "Round and Round".
