= Mark Slaughter =

American singer (born 1964)

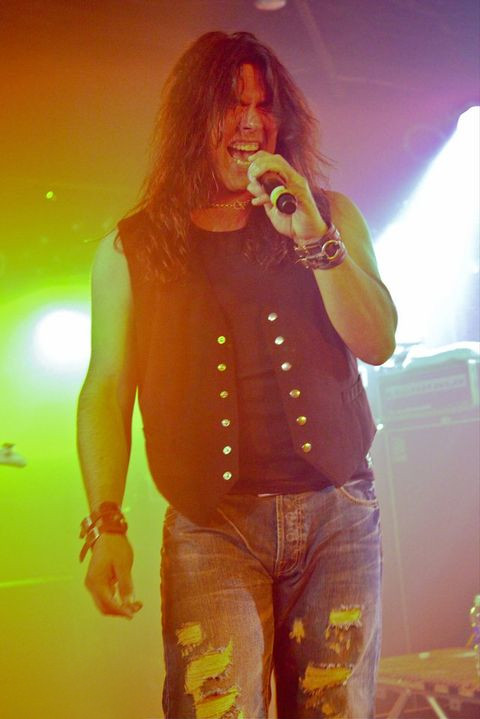
- Slaughter performing in 2011

Background information
- Born: Mark Allen Slaughter; July 4, 1964 (age 61); Las Vegas, Nevada, U.S.
- Genres: Glam metal; hard rock; heavy metal
- Occupations: Singer; musician; songwriter
- Instruments: Vocals; guitar
- Years active: 1979–present
- Member of: Slaughter
- Formerly of: Vinnie Vincent Invasion
- Website: markslaughter.com

Mark Allen Slaughter (born July 4, 1964) is an American singer and guitarist and one of the founders of the glam metal band Slaughter.

== Career ==
Slaughter was born in Las Vegas, Nevada, on July 4, 1964. Before the formation of Slaughter, he fronted Xcursion, a Las Vegas-based metal band that released two albums and appeared on three compilation albums from 1981–86. He later replaced Robert Fleischman in Vinnie Vincent Invasion. After the band disbanded in the late 1980s, Slaughter and Dana Strum formed the group Slaughter.

Slaughter sold more than five million records in the 1990s. The group had four Top 30 hits on the Billboard charts with tunes such as "Fly to the Angels" and "Up All Night", and toured with bands such as Kiss, Poison, Ozzy Osbourne and Damn Yankees.

Slaughter actively participates in charity work with St. Jude Children's Hospital.

In January 2015, Slaughter digitally released a solo album titled Reflections in a Rear View Mirror. The album was released worldwide and became available in CD format on May 22, 2015.

In May 2017, Slaughter's second solo record, Halfway There, was released via EMP Label Group.

== Filmography ==
Year	Title	Role	Notes
1993	Animaniacs	Queen Elizabeth The Queen Mother	Voice, episode: "Windsor Hassle"
1995	Freakazoid!	Lord Bravery's Mother	Voice, episode: "Sewer Rescue"
1999	Batman Beyond	Pie Joker	Voice, episode: "Bloodsport"
