= Mötley Crüe discography =

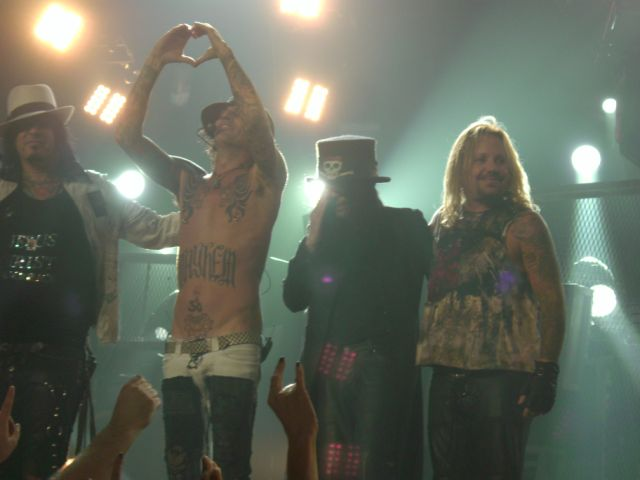
- Studio albums: 9
- Extended plays: 3
- Live albums: 3
- Compilation albums: 8
- Singles: 31
- Video albums: 9
- Music videos: 32

The discography of Mötley Crüe, an American heavy metal band, consists of nine studio albums, three live albums, three EPs, eight compilation albums, three box sets, nine DVD, 31 singles, and 32 music videos.

Mötley Crüe was formed in 1981 by bass guitarist Nikki Sixx and drummer Tommy Lee, who were later joined by lead guitarist Mick Mars and lead singer Vince Neil. Mötley Crüe has sold more than 100 million albums worldwide, including 25 million in the US.

The band members have often been noted for their hard-living lifestyles; all members have had numerous brushes with the law, have spent time in jail and have suffered long addictions to alcohol and drugs. Their ninth studio album entitled Saints of Los Angeles was released on June 24, 2008. The band announced their retirement in 2013 and played what was planned to be their final concert on December 31, 2015. In 2019, the band officially reunited.

== Studio albums ==
List of albums, with selected chart positions
Title	Album details	Peak chart positions										Certifications
Title	Album details	US	AUS	AUT	CAN	FIN	NOR	NZ	SWE	SWI	UK	Certifications
Too Fast for Love	Original release: November 10, 1981; Label: Leathür, Elektra; Format: LP, CD, CS	77	—	—	—	—	—	—	—	—	—	RIAA: Platinum
Shout at the Devil	Released: September 26, 1983; Label: Elektra; Format: LP, CD, CS	17	85	—	23	18	—	—	13	59	—	RIAA: 4× Platinum; ARIA: Gold; MC: 3× Platinum
Theatre of Pain	Released: June 24, 1985; Label: Elektra; Format: LP, CD, CS	6	7	—	11	5	—	—	7	25	36	RIAA: 4× Platinum; MC: 3× Platinum
Girls, Girls, Girls	Released: May 15, 1987; Label: Elektra; Format: LP, CD, CS	2	5	—	4	3	8	43	7	13	14	RIAA: 4× Platinum; BPI: Silver; MC: 2× Platinum
Dr. Feelgood	Released: September 1, 1989; Label: Elektra; Format: LP, CD, CS	1	5	—	7	6	7	5	6	7	4	RIAA: 9× Platinum; ARIA: Platinum; BPI: Gold; MC: 3× Platinum; RMNZ: Platinum; IFPI SWI: Gold
Mötley Crüe	Released: March 15, 1994; Label: Elektra; Format: LP, CD, CS	7	3	25	9	15	—	28	6	21	17	RIAA: Gold
Generation Swine	Released: June 24, 1997; Label: Elektra; Format: CD, CS	4	34	—	10	—	—	—	18	—	80	RIAA: Gold
New Tattoo	Released: July 11, 2000; Label: Mötley, Beyond; Format: CD, CS	41	—	—	—	—	—	—	—	—	176	
Saints of Los Angeles	Released: June 24, 2008; Label: Mötley, Eleven Seven; Format: LP, CD	4	14	73	3	6	37	8	5	42	78	MC: Gold
"—" denotes a recording that did not chart or was not released in that territory.

== Live albums ==
List of live albums, with selected chart positions
Title	Album details	Peak chart positions		Certifications
Title	Album details	US	SWI	Certifications
Live: Entertainment or Death	Release: November 23, 1999; Label: Mötley, Beyond; Formats: CD, CS	133	—	
Carnival of Sins Live	Release: February 7, 2006; Label: Mötley; Formats: CD, DVD	—	—	
The End: Live in Los Angeles	Release: October 21, 2016; Label: Eagle Vision; Formats: CD, DVD, Blu-ray	—	46	
"—" denotes a recording that did not chart or was not released in that territory.

== Compilation albums ==
List of compilation albums, with selected chart positions
Title	Album details	Peak chart positions								Certifications
Title	Album details	US	AUS	CAN	FIN	NZ	SWE	SWI	UK	Certifications
Decade of Decadence 81–91	Released: October 1, 1991; Label: Elektra; Formats: LP, CD, CS	2	9	10	24	13	43	22	20	RIAA: 2× Platinum; ARIA: Gold; MC: Platinum
Greatest Hits	Released: November 14, 1998; Label: Mötley, Beyond; Formats: CD, CS	20	—	16	—	—	—	85	—	RIAA: Gold
Supersonic and Demonic Relics	Released: June 29, 1999; Label: Mötley, Beyond; Formats: CD, CS	—	—	—	—	—	—	—	—	
The Millennium Collection: The Best of Mötley Crüe	Released: October 7, 2003; Label: Hip-O; Formats: CD	—	—	—	—	—	—	—	—	
Loud as Fuck	Released: April 13, 2004; Label: Mötley, Hip-O; Formats: CD, DVD	94	—	—	—	—	—	—	—	
Red, White & Crüe	Released: February 1, 2005; Label: Mötley, Hip-O; Formats: CD, CS	6	26	2	16	—	31	—	67	RIAA: Platinum; MC: 2× Platinum
Greatest Hits	Released: November 17, 2009; Label: Mötley, Eleven Seven; Formats: LP, CD	90	30	39	—	—	—	—	—	RIAA: Platinum; BPI: Silver; MC: Gold
The Dirt Soundtrack	Released: March 22, 2019; Label: Mötley, Eleven Seven; Formats: LP, CD, digital	10	10	7	—	—	13	8	32	
From the Beginning	Released: September 12, 2025; Label: Big Machine; Formats: LP, CD, digital	163	—	—	—	—	—	35	—	
"—" denotes a recording that did not chart or was not released in that territory.

== Box sets ==
List of box sets
Title	Details	Peak chart positions
Title	Details	US Current Sales
Music to Crash Your Car To: Vol. 1	Released: November 11, 2003; Label: Mötley, Eleven Seven; Formats: CD	×
Music to Crash Your Car To: Vol. 2	Released: June 29, 2004; Label: Mötley, Eleven Seven; Formats: CD	×
40 Years (40th Anniversary Cassette Boxset)	Released: June 12, 2021; Label: Mötley; Formats: Cassette	100
"—" denotes a release that did not chart. "×" denotes a period where a chart did not exist or was not archived.

== Extended plays ==
List of EPs
Title	Details
Raw Tracks	Released: November 23, 1988; Label: Elektra; Formats: CD, LP, CS
Raw Tracks 2	Released: November 23, 1990; Label: Elektra; Formats: CD
Quaternary	Released: September 10, 1994; Label: Elektra; Formats: CD, CS
Cancelled	Released: October 4, 2024; Label: Big Machine; Formats: CD, LP

== Singles ==
List of singles, with selected chart positions
Title	Year	Peak chart positions										Certifications	Album
Title	Year	US	US Main.	US Rock	US Hard Rock Digi.	US Hard Rock	US Heri.	AUS	NZ	SWE	UK	Certifications	Album
"Stick to Your Guns"	1981	—	—	—	—	—	—	—	—	—	—		Too Fast for Love
"Live Wire"	1982	—	—	—	11	—	—	—	—	—	—	RIAA: Gold	Too Fast for Love
"Merry-Go-Round" [promo]	1982	—	—	—	—	—	—	—	—	—	—		Too Fast for Love
"Shout at the Devil" [airplay]	1983	—	30	23	14	—	—	—	—	—	—	RIAA: Gold	Shout at the Devil
"Looks That Kill"	1984	54	12	—	17	—	—	—	—	—	—	RIAA: Gold	Shout at the Devil
"Too Young to Fall in Love"	1984	90	17	—	—	—	—	—	—	—	—		Shout at the Devil
"Helter Skelter"	1984	—	—	—	—	—	—	—	—	—	—		Shout at the Devil
"Smokin' in the Boys Room"	1985	16	7	—	—	—	—	61	—	—	71		Theatre of Pain
"Home Sweet Home"	1985	89	38	12	1	—	—	—	—	—	51	RIAA: Platinum; RMNZ: Gold	Theatre of Pain
"Keep Your Eye on the Money"	1986	—	—	—	—	—	—	—	—	—	—		Theatre of Pain
"Girls, Girls, Girls"	1987	12	20	19	7	—	—	43	—	—	26	RIAA: Platinum; RMNZ: Gold	Girls, Girls, Girls
"Wild Side"	1987	—	—	—	18	—	—	—	—	—	—	RIAA: Gold	Girls, Girls, Girls
"You're All I Need"	1987	83	—	—	—	—	—	—	—	—	23		Girls, Girls, Girls
"Dr. Feelgood"	1989	6	7	20	6	—	—	26	11	—	50	RIAA: Platinum; RMNZ: Gold	Dr. Feelgood
"Kickstart My Heart"	1989	27	18	9	3	—	—	34	31	—	—	RIAA: 2× Platinum; BPI: Gold; RMNZ: 2× Platinum	Dr. Feelgood
"Without You"	1990	8	11	—	—	—	—	46	—	—	39		Dr. Feelgood
"Don't Go Away Mad (Just Go Away)"	1990	19	13	—	—	—	—	72	49	—	—		Dr. Feelgood
"Same Ol' Situation (S.O.S.)"	1990	78	34	—	13	—	—	—	—	—	—		Dr. Feelgood
"Primal Scream"	1991	63	21	—	—	—	—	29	30	—	32		Decade of Decadence
"Home Sweet Home '91"	1991	37	41	—	—	—	—	88	—	—	37		Decade of Decadence
"Anarchy in the U.S.A."	1991	—	10	—	—	—	—	—	—	—	—		Decade of Decadence
"Angela"	1992	—	—	—	—	—	—	—	—	—	—		Decade of Decadence
"Hooligan's Holiday"	1994	—	10	—	—	—	—	60	—	34	36		Mötley Crüe
"Misunderstood"	1994	—	24	—	—	—	—	—	—	—	—		Mötley Crüe
"Uncle Jack" [promo]	1994	—	—	—	—	—	—	—	—	—	—		Mötley Crüe
"Smoke the Sky" [promo]	1994	—	—	—	—	—	—	—	—	—	—		Mötley Crüe
"Power to the Music" [promo]	1994	—	—	—	—	—	—	—	—	—			Mötley Crüe
"Afraid"	1997	—	10	—	—	—	13	—	—	—	58		Generation Swine
"Beauty"	1997	—	37	—	—	—	—	—	—	—	—		Generation Swine
"Glitter"	1997	—	—	—	—	—	—	—	—	—	—		Generation Swine
"Bitter Pill"	1998	—	22	—	—	—	19	—	—	—	—		Greatest Hits
"Enslaved" [promo]	1998	—	—	—	—	—	34	—	—	—	—		Greatest Hits
"Teaser" [promo]	1999	—	35	—	—	—	18	—	—	—	—		Supersonic and Demonic Relics
"Hell on High Heels"	2001	—	13	—	—	—	7	—	—	—	—		New Tattoo
"New Tattoo" [promo]	2001	—	—	—	—	—	—	—	—	—	—		New Tattoo
"Treat Me Like the Dog I Am" [promo]	2001	—	—	—	—	—	—	—	—	—	—		New Tattoo
"If I Die Tomorrow"	2005	—	4	—	—	—	2	—	—	—	63		Red, White & Crüe
"Sick Love Song"	2005	—	22	—	—	—	23	—	—	—	—		Red, White & Crüe
"Saints of Los Angeles"	2008	—	5	—	—	—	2	—	—	—	—		Saints of Los Angeles
"Mutherfucker of the Year" [promo]	2008	—	29	—	—	—	24	—	—	—	—		Saints of Los Angeles
"White Trash Circus" [promo]	2009	—	37	—	—	—	23	—	—	—	—		Saints of Los Angeles
"Sex"	2012	—	—	—	4	—	24	—	—	—	—		Non-album singles
"All Bad Things Must End"	2015	—	32	40	3	—	—	—	—	—	—		Non-album singles
"The Dirt (Est. 1981)" (featuring Machine Gun Kelly)	2019	—	8	18	14	—	—	—	—	—	—		The Dirt Soundtrack
"The Retaliators (21 Bullets)" (The Retaliators featuring Mötley Crüe, Asking Alexandria, Ice Nine Kills and From Ashes to New)	2022	—	15	—	—	—	—	—	—	—	—		The Retaliators
"Dogs of War"	2024	—	5	38	2	3	—	—	—	—	—		Cancelled
"(You Gotta) Fight For Your Right (To Party)"	2024	—	—	—	—	—	—	—	—	—	—		Cancelled
"Cancelled"	2024	—	38	—	4	5	—	—	—	—	—		Cancelled
"—" denotes a recording that did not chart or was not released in that territory.

== Other charted songs ==
List of other charted songs, with selected chart positions
Title	Year	Peak chart positions		Album
Title	Year	US Hard Rock Digi.	US Heri.	Album
"Take Me to the Top"	1981	22	—	Too Fast for Love
"The Animal in Me"	2008	—	28	The Saints of Los Angeles
"Crash and Burn"	2019	24	—	The Dirt Soundtrack
"—" denotes a recording that did not chart or was not released in that territory.

== Other appearances ==
List of appearances on various artist albums
Title	Year	Album	Notes
"Teaser"	1989	Stairway to Heaven/Highway to Hell	Tommy Bolin cover
"Rock 'N' Roll Junkie"	1990	The Adventures of Ford Fairlane	original song

== Video albums ==
List of video albums
Title	Album details	Certifications
Uncensored	Released: 1986; Label: Elektra; Format: VHS, LaserDisc	RIAA: 2× Platinum
Dr. Feelgood: The Videos	Released: 1990; Label: Elektra; Format: VHS, LaserDisc	RIAA: Platinum
Decade of Decadence	Released: 1992; Label: Elektra; Format: VHS, LaserDisc	RIAA: Gold
Behind the Music: Mötley Crüe	Released: 1998; Label: Format: VHS, DVD	
Lewd, Crüed & Tattooed	Released: 2001; Label: Mötley; Format: VHS, DVD	RIAA: Gold; ARIA: Platinum
Greatest Video Hits	Released: 2003; Label: Mötley; Format: DVD	RIAA: Platinum
Classic Mötley Crüe: Universal Masters DVD Collection	Released: 2005; Label: Mötley; Format: DVD	
Carnival of Sins Live	Released: 2006; Label: Mötley; Format: DVD, Blu-ray	RIAA: 3× Platinum
Crüe Fest	Released: March 24, 2009; Label: Mötley; Format: DVD	

== Music videos ==
List of music videos
Title	Year
"Live Wire"	1982
"Looks That Kill"	1983
"Too Young to Fall in Love"	1984
"Smokin' in the Boys Room"	1985
"Home Sweet Home"	1985
"Girls, Girls, Girls"	1987
"Wild Side"	1987
"You're All I Need"	1987
"Dr. Feelgood"	1989
"Kickstart My Heart"	1989
"Without You"	1990
"Don't Go Away Mad (Just Go Away)"	1990
"Same Ol' Situation (S.O.S.)"	1990
"Primal Scream"	1991
"Home Sweet Home '91"	1991
"Anarchy in the U.K."	1991
"Hooligan's Holiday"	1994
"Misunderstood"	1994
"Uncle Jack"	1994
"Smoke the Sky"	1994
"Power to the Music"	1994
"Afraid"	1997
"Shout at the Devil '97"	1997
"Enslaved"	1998
"Hell on High Heels"	2000
"If I Die Tomorrow"	2004
"Sick Love Song"	2005
"Saints of Los Angeles"	2008
"Mutherfucker of the Year"	2008
"White Trash Circus"	2009
"Kickstart My Heart – 2011"	2011
"Sex"	2012
"All Bad Things Must End"	2015
"The Dirt (Est. 1981)"	2019
"Ride with the Devil"	2019
"Take Me to the Top"	2019
"Same Ol' Situation (S.O.S.) – 2019"	2019
"Looks That Kill – 2019"	2019
"Shout at the Devil – 2019"	2020
"Dogs of War"	2024
"Cancelled"	2024
