= Greatest Hits (Mötley Crüe album) =

- The original 1998 cover. On the 2009 digital re-issue, the cover is tinted red.

Compilation album by Mötley Crüe
- Released: October 27, 1998
- Recorded: 1981–1998; 1981–2009 (reissue)
- Genre: Heavy metal; glam metal; hard rock; alternative metal
- Length: 73:56; 78:57 (reissue)
- Label: Mötley; Beyond

Mötley Crüe chronology
| Generation Swine (1997) | Greatest Hits (1998) | Supersonic and Demonic Relics (1999) |

Mötley Crüe chronology
| Saints of Los Angeles (2008) | Greatest Hits (2009) | The Dirt Soundtrack (2019) |

Singles from Greatest Hits
- 1. "Bitter Pill" Released: 1998; 2. "Enslaved" Released: 1998

Alternative cover
- Slipcase cover for 2009 reissue

Professional ratings
Review scores
| Source | Rating |
|---|---|
| AllMusic | 4.5/5 stars |
| AllMusic | 4.5/5 stars |
| Collector's Guide to Heavy Metal | 5/10 |
| Blare Magazine | 3.5/5 stars |
| The Rolling Stone Album Guide | 4/5 stars |

Greatest Hits (stylized as GREATE$T HIT$) is the second compilation album by American heavy metal band Mötley Crüe, released by Mötley Records and Beyond Music on October 27, 1998. It is an updated version of the 1991 compilation Decade of Decadence 81–91, which is currently out of print. Its cover art features a caricature of the band by artist/designer Erik Casillas. The album was reissued by Eleven Seven Music on November 17, 2009, with a different track listing.

== Commercial performance ==
Greatest Hits charted at number 20 on the Billboard 200 in 1998. The compilation featured two newly recorded songs: the singles "Bitter Pill" which charted at number 22 on the Mainstream rock charts and "Enslaved" which charted at number 34 on the Billboard Heritage charts.

The 2009 version charted at No. 10 on the Top Hard Rock Albums chart and No. 9 on the Top Independent Albums chart on Billboard magazine.

== Accolades ==
Greatest Hits won the 1998 Metal Edge Readers' Choice Award for "Best Compilation".

== Track listing ==
=== 1998 version ===
All tracks are written by Nikki Sixx, except where noted.

| No. | Title | Writer(s) | Original release | Length |
|---|---|---|---|---|
| 1. | "Bitter Pill" | Nikki Sixx; Mick Mars; Vince Neil; Tommy Lee | New recording | 4:27 |
| 2. | "Enslaved" | Sixx; Mars; Lee | New recording | 4:30 |
| 3. | "Girls, Girls, Girls" | Sixx; Mars; Lee | Girls, Girls, Girls (1987) | 4:30 |
| 4. | "Kickstart My Heart" | | Dr. Feelgood (1989) | 4:44 |
| 5. | "Wild Side" | Sixx; Mars; Neil | Girls, Girls, Girls | 4:37 |
| 6. | "Glitter" (Remix) | Sixx; Bryan Adams; Scott Humphrey | Generation Swine (1997) | 5:40 |
| 7. | "Dr. Feelgood" | Sixx; Mars | Dr. Feelgood | 4:43 |
| 8. | "Same Ol' Situation (S.O.S.)" | Sixx; Mars; Neil; Lee | Dr. Feelgood | 4:14 |
| 9. | "Home Sweet Home" | Sixx; Lee | Theatre of Pain (1985) | 3:57 |
| 10. | "Afraid" | | Generation Swine | 4:08 |
| 11. | "Don't Go Away Mad (Just Go Away)" | Sixx; Mars | Dr. Feelgood | 4:40 |
| 12. | "Without You" | Sixx; Mars | Dr. Feelgood | 4:29 |
| 13. | "Smokin' in the Boys Room" (Brownsville Station cover) | Cub Koda; Michael Lutz | Theatre of Pain | 3:27 |
| 14. | "Primal Scream" | Sixx; Mars; Neil; Lee | Decade of Decadence 81–91 (1991) | 4:46 |
| 15. | "Too Fast for Love" | | Too Fast for Love (1981) | 3:21 |
| 16. | "Looks That Kill" | | Shout at the Devil (1983) | 4:01 |
| 17. | "Shout at the Devil '97" | | Generation Swine | 3:42 |
| Total length: | | | | 73:56 |

=== 2009 version ===
All tracks are written by Nikki Sixx, except where noted.

| No. | Title | Writer(s) | Original release | Length |
|---|---|---|---|---|
| 1. | "Too Fast for Love" | | Too Fast for Love | 3:26 |
| 2. | "Shout at the Devil" | | Shout at the Devil | 3:16 |
| 3. | "Looks That Kill" | | Shout at the Devil | 4:09 |
| 4. | "Too Young to Fall in Love" | | Shout at the Devil | 3:33 |
| 5. | "Smokin' in the Boys Room" | Koda; Lutz | Theatre of Pain | 3:28 |
| 6. | "Home Sweet Home" | Sixx; Lee | Theatre of Pain | 4:01 |
| 7. | "Wild Side" | Sixx; Mars; Neil | Girls, Girls, Girls | 4:42 |
| 8. | "Girls, Girls, Girls" | Sixx; Mars; Lee | Girls, Girls, Girls | 4:30 |
| 9. | "Dr. Feelgood" | Sixx; Mars | Dr. Feelgood | 4:51 |
| 10. | "Kickstart My Heart" | | Dr. Feelgood | 4:44 |
| 11. | "Same Ol' Situation (S.O.S.)" | Sixx; Mars; Neil; Lee | Dr. Feelgood | 4:14 |
| 12. | "Don't Go Away Mad (Just Go Away)" | Sixx; Mars | Dr. Feelgood | 4:40 |
| 13. | "Without You" | Sixx; Mars | Dr. Feelgood | 4:30 |
| 14. | "Primal Scream" | Sixx; Mars; Neil; Lee | Decade of Decadence 81–91 | 4:47 |
| 15. | "Sick Love Song" | Sixx; James Michael | Red, White & Crüe (2006) | 4:19 |
| 16. | "Afraid" | | Generation Swine | 4:09 |
| 17. | "If I Die Tomorrow" | Sixx; Simple Plan | Red, White & Crüe | 3:42 |
| 18. | "Saints of Los Angeles" | Sixx; Michael; DJ Ashba; Marti Frederiksen | Saints of Los Angeles (2008) | 3:40 |
| 19. | "The Animal in Me" (Remix) | Sixx; Michael; Ashba; Frederiksen | Saints of Los Angeles | 4:16 |
| Total length: | | | | 78:57 |

Extended Version bonus tracks
| No. | Title | Writer(s) | Length |
|---|---|---|---|
| 20. | "Girls, Girls, Girls" (from Live Around the World 1989-1990) | Sixx; Mars; Lee | 5:42 |
| 21. | "Red Hot" (from Live Around the World 1989-1990) | Sixx; Mars; Neil | 3:21 |
| 22. | "All in the Name of..." (from Live Around the World 1989-1990) | Sixx; Neil | 4:54 |
| 23. | "Dr. Feelgood" (from Live Around the World 1989-1990) | Sixx; Mars | 6:41 |

== Charts ==
=== Album ===
| Chart (1998) | Peak position |
|---|---|
| Australian Albums (ARIA) | 30 |
| Canadian Albums (Billboard) | 16 |
| Swedish Albums (Sverigetopplistan) | 85 |
| US Billboard 200 | 20 |

| Chart (2009) | Peak position |
|---|---|
| US Billboard 200 | 90 |
| US Independent Albums (Billboard) | 9 |

=== Singles ===
| Year | Title | Chart | Position |
|---|---|---|---|
| 1998 | "Bitter Pill" | Billboard Mainstream Rock Airplay | 22 |
| 1999 | "Enslaved" | Billboard Heritage Rock | 34 |

== Certifications ==
1998 version

| Region | Certification | Certified units/sales |
|---|---|---|
| United States (RIAA) | Gold | 500,000^{^} |
^{^} Shipments figures based on certification alone.

2009 version

| Region | Certification | Certified units/sales |
|---|---|---|
| Canada (Music Canada) | Gold | 40,000^{^} |
| United Kingdom (BPI) | Silver | 60,000^{‡} |
| United States (RIAA) | Platinum | 1,000,000^{^} |
^{^} Shipments figures based on certification alone.^{‡} Sales+streaming figures based on certification alone.
