= The Dirt Soundtrack =

Soundtrack album by Mötley Crüe
- Released: March 22, 2019
- Recorded: 1981–2019
- Genre: Heavy metal; glam metal; hard rock
- Length: 70:32
- Label: Mötley; Eleven Seven
- Producer: Dave Donnelly; Bob Rock

Mötley Crüe chronology
Greatest Hits (2009)	The Dirt Soundtrack (2019)	Cancelled (2024)

Singles from The Dirt Soundtrack
- 1. "The Dirt (Est. 1981)" Released: 2019

Professional ratings
Review scores
Source	Rating
AllMusic	3.5/5 stars
The Spill Magazine	4/5 stars

The Dirt Soundtrack is the soundtrack album to the 2019 biographical film of the same name by Mötley Crüe, inspired by the book The Dirt: Confessions of the World's Most Notorious Rock Band by the band and Neil Strauss. It was their tenth compilation album. The soundtrack was released by Mötley Records and Eleven Seven Records on March 22, 2019, on CD, LP, and digital formats. It is the band’s first release in over a decade since their 2009 Greatest Hits album.

== Background ==
"There's no new music to be made for it," Nikki Sixx declared in 2016, when financing for the film had yet to be finalized. "No reason for it. And if it comes down to [adopts the voice of a record label person], 'Well, you have a new movie – you need to write new music for the movie,' I'm like, 'I'm sorry, but that's cheap.' We don't want to get back into the studio and go, 'We have to write a song, for marketing.' I want to write music because it's real."

On February 22, 2019, Mötley Crüe and Machine Gun Kelly (who plays Tommy Lee in the film) released the video for the song "The Dirt (Est. 1981)" on their YouTube channel. The band announced that the film's soundtrack would also feature three new recordings, all produced with longtime collaborator Bob Rock: "Ride with the Devil", "Crash and Burn", and a cover of Madonna's "Like a Virgin".

For the new songs, the band collaborated with Machine Gun Kelly, John 5 (who would eventually replace Mick Mars as the band's guitarist in 2023), and Sahaj Ticotin of Ra. They composed nine songs, but narrowed them down to the three tracks featured in the soundtrack.

In 2019, "The Dirt (Est. 1981)" was featured on the soundtrack for the video game WWE 2K20.

== Commercial performance ==
The soundtrack reached No. 10 on the Billboard 200, making it the band's first top-10 album since Saints of Los Angeles charted at No. 4 on July 4, 2008.

== Track listing ==
All tracks are written by Nikki Sixx, except where noted.

No.	Title	Writer(s)	Original recording	Length
1.	"The Dirt (Est. 1981)" (featuring Machine Gun Kelly)	Sixx; John 5; Sahaj Ticotin; Colson Baker; Tommy Lee; Mick Mars; Vince Neil	New recording	3:52
2.	"Red Hot"	Sixx; Mars; Neil	Shout at the Devil (1983)	3:21
3.	"On with the Show"	Sixx; Neil	Too Fast for Love (1981)	4:03
4.	"Live Wire"		Too Fast for Love	3:14
5.	"Merry-Go-Round"		Too Fast for Love	3:21
6.	"Take Me to the Top"		Too Fast for Love	3:43
7.	"Piece of Your Action"	Sixx; Neil	Too Fast for Love	4:39
8.	"Shout at the Devil"		Shout at the Devil	3:14
9.	"Looks That Kill"		Shout at the Devil	4:07
10.	"Too Young to Fall in Love"		Shout at the Devil	3:32
11.	"Home Sweet Home"	Sixx; Lee	Theatre of Pain (1985)	3:58
12.	"Girls, Girls, Girls"	Sixx; Lee; Mars	Girls, Girls, Girls (1987)	4:30
13.	"Same Ol' Situation (S.O.S.)"	Sixx; Lee; Neil; Mars	Dr. Feelgood (1989)	4:13
14.	"Kickstart My Heart"		Dr. Feelgood	4:42
15.	"Dr. Feelgood"	Sixx; Mars	Dr. Feelgood	4:50
16.	"Ride with the Devil"	Sixx; John 5; Ticotin; Lee; Mars; Neil	New recording	3:41
17.	"Crash and Burn"	Sixx; John 5; Ticotin; Lee; Mars; Neil	New recording	4:13
18.	"Like a Virgin" (Madonna cover)	Tom Kelly; Billy Steinberg	New recording	3:08
Total length:				70:32

Songs not included in the soundtrack, but featured in the film include the following:

- The Jaynetts – "Cry Behind the Daisies"
- T. Rex – "Solid Gold Easy Action"
- Death – "Keep on Knocking"
- Gary Charlson – "Close Enough"
- The Kind – "Total Insanity"
- Billy Squier – "My Kinda Lover"
- Kim Wilde – "Chequered Love"
- Jimmy Carter and the Dallas County Green – "A Night of Love"
- The Colors – "Go Go Getter"
- Heat Exchange – "Philosophy"
- Goliath – "Hot Rock and Thunder"
- Jonathan Elias and John Petersen – "Man on the Moon"
- Liquid Blue – "Big Money"
- Nu Shooz – "I Can't Wait"
- Meghan Kabir – "Live Wire"
- Johnny Thunders – "You Can't Put Your Arms Around a Memory"

== Charts ==
=== Album ===
Chart (2019)	Peak position
Australian Albums (ARIA)	10
Austrian Albums (Ö3 Austria)	29
French Albums (SNEP)	109
German Albums (Offizielle Top 100)	33
Italian Albums (FIMI)	66
Scottish Albums (OCC)	18
Spanish Albums (PROMUSICAE)	41
Swedish Albums (Sverigetopplistan)	13
Swiss Albums (Schweizer Hitparade)	8
UK Albums (OCC)	32
US Billboard 200	10
US Top Album Sales (Billboard)	3
US Top Rock Albums (Billboard)	2
US Soundtrack Albums (Billboard)	3

Chart (2022)	Peak position
Canadian Albums (Billboard)	5

=== Year-end charts ===
Chart (2019)	Position
US Top Rock Albums (Billboard)	43
US Soundtrack Albums (Billboard)	17

Chart (2024)	Position
US Soundtrack Albums (Billboard)	16

=== The Dirt Single ===
Chart (2019)	Peak position
US Mainstream Rock (Billboard)	8
Billboard Rock Digital Songs	23
Billboard Hard Rock Digital Songs	14
Billboard Rock Alternative Airplay	20
Billboard Hot Rock Alternative	18
