= Red, White & Crüe =

Compilation album by Mötley Crüe
- Released: February 1, 2005
- Recorded: 1981–2004
- Studio: Annex Studios (new tracks); Cello Studios (new tracks)
- Genre: Heavy metal; glam metal; hard rock; alternative metal; grunge; industrial rock
- Length: 2:30:29; 2:33:41 (Japanese release); 77:02 (single disc version)
- Label: Mötley; Hip-O

Mötley Crüe chronology
| Loud as Fuck (2004) | Red, White & Crüe (2005) | Carnival of Sins Live (2006) |

Singles from Red, White & Crüe
- 1. "If I Die Tomorrow" Released: 2005; 2. "Sick Love Song" Released: 2005

Professional ratings
Review scores
| Source | Rating |
|---|---|
| AllMusic | 4.5/5 stars |
| Chicago Tribune | favorable |
| KNAC | 3.5/5 stars |
| Mojo | 4/5 stars |
| PopMatters | mixed |
| Rolling Stone | 3.5/5 stars |
| Sea of Tranquility | 3.5/5 stars |

Red, White & Crüe is the eighth compilation album by the heavy metal band Mötley Crüe, released on February 1, 2005 by Mötley Records and Hip-O Records, The album charted at number 6 on the Billboard 200. To coincide with the album's release, the band reunited with drummer Tommy Lee, who left the band in 1999.

== Background ==
Bassist Nikki Sixx commented on the band's reunion, comparing it to "seeing Mike Tyson fight. He probably won’t bite anyone’s ear off — but you’re there in case he does."

According to vocalist Vince Neil, the early stages of the band's reunion were "kinda' strained. I hadn’t talked to Tommy Lee in years. Everyone was really guarded and had their managers there. It was very strange. Mick Mars was home, I guess. Either there or the hospital."

== Release and promotion ==
Red, White & Crüe features three new studio recordings: the album's lead single, "If I Die Tomorrow", co-written by pop punk band Simple Plan, the second single "Sick Love Song" and "Street Fighting Man", a Rolling Stones cover. Tommy Lee does not perform on the cover of "Street Fighting Man"; drumming duties were handled by Josh Freese of the Vandals. The album also features previously unreleased tracks "Black Widow" and the Japanese bonus track "I'm a Liar".

A video was made for "Sick Love Song," though the video, mostly composed of produced concert clips, got only scarce airplay, the song found its way onto some rock-oriented radio stations.

A special edition that includes a "Greatest Video Hits" DVD compilation was also made.

== Track listing ==
All tracks are written by Nikki Sixx, except where noted.

Disc 1
| No. | Title | Writer(s) | Original release | Length |
|---|---|---|---|---|
| 1. | "Live Wire" | | Too Fast for Love (1981) | 3:15 |
| 2. | "Piece of Your Action" | Sixx; Vince Neil | Too Fast for Love | 4:40 |
| 3. | "Toast of the Town" | Sixx; Mick Mars | "Stick to Your Guns" single (1981) | 3:14 |
| 4. | "Too Fast for Love" | | Too Fast for Love | 3:21 |
| 5. | "Black Widow" | | Previously unreleased | 4:26 |
| 6. | "Looks That Kill" | | Shout at the Devil (1983) | 4:07 |
| 7. | "Too Young to Fall in Love" (Remix) | | Shout at the Devil | 3:38 |
| 8. | "Helter Skelter" (The Beatles cover) | Lennon–McCartney | Shout at the Devil | 3:12 |
| 9. | "Shout at the Devil" | | Shout at the Devil | 3:14 |
| 10. | "Smokin' in the Boys Room" (Brownsville Station cover) | Cub Koda; Michael Lutz | Theatre of Pain (1985) | 3:27 |
| 11. | "Use It or Lose It" | Sixx; Mars; Neil; Tommy Lee | Theatre of Pain | 2:39 |
| 12. | "Girls, Girls, Girls" | Sixx; Mars; Lee | Girls, Girls, Girls (1987) | 4:30 |
| 13. | "Wild Side" | Sixx; Mars; Neil | Girls, Girls, Girls | 4:40 |
| 14. | "You're All I Need" | Sixx; Lee | Girls, Girls, Girls | 4:43 |
| 15. | "All in the Name of..." | Sixx; Neil | Girls, Girls, Girls | 3:39 |
| 16. | "Kickstart My Heart" | | Dr. Feelgood (1989) | 4:48 |
| 17. | "Without You" | Sixx; Mars | Dr. Feelgood | 4:29 |
| 18. | "Don't Go Away Mad (Just Go Away)" | Sixx; Mars | Dr. Feelgood | 4:40 |
| 19. | "Same Ol' Situation (S.O.S.)" | Sixx; Mars; Neil; Lee | Dr. Feelgood | 4:12 |
| 20. | "Dr. Feelgood" | Sixx; Mars | Dr. Feelgood | 4:50 |

Disc 2
| No. | Title | Writer(s) | Original release | Length |
|---|---|---|---|---|
| 1. | "Anarchy in the U.K." (Sex Pistols cover) | Paul Cook; Steve Jones; Glen Matlock; Johnny Rotten | Decade of Decadence 81–91 (1991) | 3:20 |
| 2. | "Primal Scream" | Sixx; Mars; Neil; Lee | Decade of Decadence 81–91 | 4:47 |
| 3. | "Home Sweet Home ('91 Remix)" (feat. string arrangements by David Campbell) | Sixx; Neil; Lee | Decade of Decadence 81–91 | 4:01 |
| 4. | "Hooligan's Holiday" (Brown Nose Edit) | Sixx; John Corabi; Mars; Lee | Mötley Crüe (1994) | 5:20 |
| 5. | "Misunderstood" (Successful Format Version) | | Mötley Crüe | 4:58 |
| 6. | "Planet Boom" | Lee | Quaternary (1994) | 3:23 |
| 7. | "Bittersuite" (Instrumental) | Mars | Quaternary | 3:19 |
| 8. | "Afraid" (Alternative Rave Mix) | | Generation Swine (1997) | 4:08 |
| 9. | "Beauty" | Sixx; Lee | Generation Swine | 3:46 |
| 10. | "Generation Swine" | Sixx; Lee | Generation Swine | 4:40 |
| 11. | "Bitter Pill" | Sixx; Mars; Neil; Lee | Greatest Hits (1998) | 4:26 |
| 12. | "Enslaved" | Sixx; Mars; Lee | Greatest Hits | 4:30 |
| 13. | "Hell on High Heels" | Sixx; Mars; Neil | New Tattoo (2000) | 4:16 |
| 14. | "New Tattoo" (Single version) | Sixx; Mars; James Michael | New Tattoo | 4:02 |
| 15. | "If I Die Tomorrow" | Sixx; Simple Plan | Previously unreleased | 3:46 |
| 16. | "Sick Love Song" | Sixx; Michael | Previously unreleased | 4:18 |
| 17. | "Street Fighting Man" (The Rolling Stones cover) | Jagger–Richards | Previously unreleased | 3:31 |

Japanese release bonus track
| No. | Title | Writer(s) | Original release | Length |
|---|---|---|---|---|
| 18. | "I'm a Liar (That's the Truth)" | Sixx; Stacy Jones | Previously unreleased | 3:11 |

Single Disc version
| No. | Title | Writer(s) | Original release | Length |
|---|---|---|---|---|
| 1. | "Live Wire" | | Too Fast for Love | 3:15 |
| 2. | "Piece of Your Action" | Sixx; Neil | Too Fast for Love | 4:40 |
| 3. | "Black Widow" | | Previously unreleased | 4:26 |
| 4. | "Looks That Kill" | | Shout at the Devil | 4:07 |
| 5. | "Too Young to Fall in Love" (Remix) | | Shout at the Devil | 3:38 |
| 6. | "Shout at the Devil" | | Shout at the Devil | 3:14 |
| 7. | "Girls, Girls, Girls" | Sixx; Mars; Lee | Girls, Girls, Girls | 4:30 |
| 8. | "Wild Side" | Sixx; Mars; Neil | Girls, Girls, Girls | 4:40 |
| 9. | "Kickstart My Heart" | | Dr. Feelgood | 4:48 |
| 10. | "Dr. Feelgood" | Sixx; Mars | Dr. Feelgood | 4:50 |
| 11. | "Primal Scream" | Sixx; Mars; Neil; Lee | Generation Swine | 4:47 |
| 12. | "Home Sweet Home" ('91 Remix) | Sixx; Neil; Lee | Decade of Decadence 81–91 | 4:01 |
| 13. | "Hooligan's Holiday" (Brown Nose Edit) | Sixx; Corabi; Mars; Lee | Mötley Crüe | 5:20 |
| 14. | "Beauty" | Sixx; Lee | Generation Swine | 3:46 |
| 15. | "Bitter Pill" | Sixx; Mars; Neil; Lee | Greatest Hits | 4:26 |
| 16. | "Hell on High Heels" | Sixx; Mars; Neil | New Tattoo | 4:16 |
| 17. | "If I Die Tomorrow" (Rock Mix) | Sixx; Simple Plan | Previously unreleased | 3:46 |
| 18. | "Sick Love Song" | Sixx; Michael | Previously unreleased | 4:18 |
| Total length: | | | | 77:02 |

== Charts ==
=== Weekly charts ===
Weekly chart performance for Red, White & Crüe
| Chart (2005) | Peak position |
|---|---|
| Australian Albums (ARIA) | 26 |
| Canadian Albums (Billboard) | 2 |
| Finnish Albums (Suomen virallinen lista) | 16 |
| Scottish Albums (OCC) | 54 |
| Swedish Albums (Sverigetopplistan) | 31 |
| UK Albums (OCC) | 67 |
| UK Rock & Metal Albums (OCC) | 12 |
| US Billboard 200 | 6 |

=== Year-end charts ===
Year-end chart performance for Red, White & Crüe
| Chart (2005) | Position |
|---|---|
| US Billboard 200 | 178 |

== Certifications ==
Certifications for Red, White & Crüe
| Region | Certification | Certified units/sales |
|---|---|---|
| Canada (Music Canada) | 2× Platinum | 200,000^{^} |
| United States (RIAA) | Platinum | 1,000,000^{^} |
^{^} Shipments figures based on certification alone.
