= Crüe Fest =

2008 concert tour by Mötley Crüe

Crüe Fest was a summer 2008 tour by Mötley Crüe, which commenced on July 1, 2008 and concluded on August 31, 2008. It featured Mötley Crüe themselves, Buckcherry, Papa Roach, Sixx:A.M., and Trapt. Crüe Fest was said to be "the Loudest Show on Earth". The tour earned around $40 million and was the most successful, most popular festival of the summer.

== Origins ==
The tour was formulated in January 2008 by Nikki Sixx. Shortly afterwards, the idea was established to involve both bands of whom Sixx was then a member: Mötley Crüe and Sixx:A.M. Crüe Fest was born: a new touring festival of 'bands that embody the spirit of rock and roll' in the same vein as Ozzfest. Mötley's official website, , had promised a special announcement and, on April 15, 2008, the band hosted a press conference, where they announced the tour, premiered their "Saints of Los Angeles" video, and performed "Kickstart My Heart" and "Saints of Los Angeles".

== Tour dates ==
| Date | City | Country | Venue |
|---|---|---|---|
| July 1, 2008 | West Palm Beach, Florida | United States | Cruzan Amphitheatre |
| July 3, 2008 | Tampa, Florida | United States | Ford Amphitheatre |
| July 5, 2008 | Charlotte, North Carolina | United States | Verizon Wireless Amphitheatre |
| July 6, 2008 | Virginia Beach, Virginia | United States | Verizon Wireless Virginia Beach Amphitheater |
| July 8, 2008 | Wantagh, New York | United States | Nikon at Jones Beach Theater |
| July 9, 2008 | Corfu, New York | United States | Darien Lake Performing Arts Center |
| July 10, 2008 | Sarnia, Ontario | Canada | Sarnia Bayfest (Mötley Crüe only) |
| July 12, 2008 | Camden, New Jersey | United States | Susquehanna Bank Center |
| July 13, 2008 | Bristow, Virginia | United States | Nissan Pavilion |
| July 15, 2008 | Clarkston, Michigan | United States | DTE Energy Music Theatre |
| July 16, 2008 | Tinley Park, Illinois | United States | First Midwest Bank Amphitheatre |
| July 18, 2008 | Noblesville, Indiana | United States | Verizon Wireless Music Center |
| July 19, 2008 | Milwaukee, Wisconsin | United States | Marcus Amphitheater |
| July 20, 2008 | Maryland Heights, Missouri | United States | Verizon Wireless Amphitheater |
| July 22, 2008 | Houston, Texas | United States | Toyota Center |
| July 23, 2008 | Selma, Texas | United States | Verizon Wireless Amphitheater |
| July 24, 2008 | Dallas, Texas | United States | SuperPages.com Center |
| July 26, 2008 | Albuquerque, New Mexico | United States | Journal Pavilion |
| July 27, 2008 | Greenwood Village, Colorado | United States | Fiddler's Green Amphitheatre |
| July 29, 2008 | West Valley City, Utah | United States | USANA Amphitheatre |
| July 31, 2008 | Phoenix, Arizona | United States | Cricket Wireless Pavilion |
| August 1, 2008 | Paradise, Nevada | United States | Mandalay Bay Events Center |
| August 2, 2008 | San Bernardino, California | United States | San Manuel Amphitheater |
| August 5, 2008 | Wheatland, California | United States | Sleep Train Amphitheatre |
| August 6, 2008 | Mountain View, California | United States | Shoreline Amphitheatre |
| August 8, 2008 | Auburn, Washington | United States | White River Amphitheatre |
| August 9, 2008 | Portland, Oregon | United States | Rose Garden |
| August 11, 2008 | Vancouver | Canada | General Motors Place |
| August 13, 2008 | Edmonton, Alberta | Canada | Rexall Place |
| August 14, 2008 | Calgary, Alberta | Canada | Pengrowth Saddledome |
| August 15, 2008 | Saskatoon, Saskatchewan | Canada | Credit Union Centre |
| August 17, 2008 | Winnipeg, Manitoba | Canada | MTS Centre |
| August 19, 2008 | Cincinnati | United States | Riverbend Music Center |
| August 20, 2008 | Cuyahoga Falls, Ohio | United States | Blossom Music Center |
| August 22, 2008 | Mansfield, Massachusetts | United States | Comcast Center for the Performing Arts |
| August 23, 2008 | Holmdel Township, New Jersey | United States | PNC Bank Arts Center |
| August 24, 2008 | Uncasville, Connecticut | United States | Mohegan Sun Arena |
| August 28, 2008 | Toronto | Canada | Molson Amphitheatre |
| August 29, 2008 | Saratoga Springs, New York | United States | Saratoga Performing Arts Center |
| August 30, 2008 | Scranton, Pennsylvania | United States | Toyota Pavilion at Montage Mountain |
| August 31, 2008 | Burgettstown, Pennsylvania | United States | Post-Gazette Pavilion |

== DVD ==
Crüe Fest

Video by Mötley Crüe, Buckcherry, Papa Roach, Sixx:A.M., and Trapt
- Released: March 24, 2009
- Recorded: August 28, 2008 at the Molson Amphitheatre in Toronto
- Genre: Heavy metal; hard rock; glam metal
- Length: 2:40:00
- Label: Mötley; Eleven Seven
- Director: P.R. Brown
- Producer: P.R. Brown

Mötley Crüe chronology
| Carnival of Sins Live (2006) | Crüe Fest (2009) |

On March 24, 2009, the Crüe Fest DVD was released. The main concert was filmed on August 28, 2008 at the Molson Amphitheatre in Toronto, with some clips filmed at the other venues of the tour. The film was directed by P.R. Brown and was filmed in high definition with 5.1 stereo audio. The DVD reached number one on the Billboard Top Music Video chart, selling 7,000 copies in its first week of release.

=== Track listing ===
Disc one:
Mötley Crüe

1. "Opening"
2. "Kickstart My Heart"
3. "Wild Side"
4. "Shout at the Devil"
5. "Saints of Los Angeles"
6. "Live Wire"
7. "Sick Love Song"
8. "Tit E Cam"
9. "Mutherfucker of the Year"
10. "Don't Go Away Mad (Just Go Away)"
11. "Same Ol' Situation (S.O.S.)"
12. "Primal Scream"
13. "Looks That Kill"
14. "Girls, Girls, Girls"
15. "Dr. Feelgood"
16. "Home Sweet Home"

Disc two:
Trapt

1. "Contagious"
2. "Headstrong"

Sixx:A.M.

1. "Opening"
2. "Pray for Me"
3. "Life Is Beautiful"

Papa Roach

1. "Opening"
2. "Time Is Running Out"
3. "Forever"
4. "Last Resort"

Buckcherry

1. "Opening"
2. "Lit Up"
3. "Sorry"
4. "Crazy Bitch"

=== Bonus features ===
- Crüe Fest 2008 All "Excess" Pass Documentary
- Music videos
  - "White Trash Circus"
  - "Saints of Los Angeles"
  - "Primal Scream"
  - "Looks That Kill"
  - "Live Wire"
  - "Kickstart My Heart"
