= Carnival of Sins Live =

Carnival of Sins: Live

Live album by Mötley Crüe
- Released: February 7, 2006
- Recorded: April 27, 2005
- Venue: Van Andel Arena in Grand Rapids, Michigan
- Genre: Heavy metal
- Label: Mötley

Mötley Crüe chronology
Red, White & Crüe (2005)	Carnival of Sins: Live (2006)	Saints of Los Angeles (2008)

Professional ratings
Review scores
Source	Rating
AllMusic	2.5/5 stars
The Rolling Stone Album Guide	2.5/5 stars

Carnival of Sins: Live is a 2-CD live album by American rock band Mötley Crüe. It was released in 2006 on Mötley Records.

== Background ==
The album features the Grand Rapids, Michigan performance from the band's 2005-2006 Carnival of Sins tour. Carnival of Sins is also available on DVD, featuring the album in its entirety. In addition, Wal-Mart released the 2 discs individually as Carnival of Sins vol. 1 and vol. 2. Other than a few vocal and guitar overdubs to fix some wrong notes/vocals from the concert, the record is mostly an unoverdubbed live album with the usual edits to make it a two-CD offering.

== Track listing ==
All tracks are written by Nikki Sixx, except where noted.

Enhanced CD 1
No.	Title	Writer(s)	Length
1.	"Shout at the Devil"		3:47
2.	"Too Fast for Love"		4:01
3.	"Ten Seconds to Love"	Sixx; Vince Neil	5:36
4.	"Red Hot"	Sixx; Mick Mars; Neil	3:28
5.	"On with the Show"		4:42
6.	"Too Young to Fall in Love"		3:54
7.	"Looks That Kill"		4:27
8.	"Louder Than Hell"		2:36
9.	"Live Wire"		6:36
10.	"Girls, Girls, Girls"	Sixx; Tommy Lee; Mars	4:40
11.	"Wild Side"	Sixx; Lee; Neil	5:12

Enhanced CD 1 bonus track
No.	Title	Length
12.	"Too Fast for Love" (video)	4:36

Enhanced CD 2
No.	Title	Writer(s)	Length
1.	"Don't Go Away Mad (Just Go Away)"	Sixx; Mars	5:10
2.	"Primal Scream"	Sixx; Lee; Neil; Mars	5:07
3.	"Glitter"	Sixx; Bryan Adams	2:31
4.	"Without You"	Sixx; Mars	1:39
5.	"Home Sweet Home"	Sixx; Lee	5:29
6.	"Dr. Feelgood"	Sixx; Mars	5:44
7.	"Same Ol' Situation (S.O.S.)"	Sixx; Lee; Neil; Mars	4:39
8.	"Sick Love Song"	Sixx; James Michael	4:18
9.	"If I Die Tomorrow"	Sixx; Simple Plan	4:29
10.	"Kickstart My Heart"		7:06
11.	"Helter Skelter" (The Beatles cover)	Lennon–McCartney	3:24
12.	"Anarchy in the U.K." (Sex Pistols cover)	Paul Cook; Steve Jones; Glen Matlock; Johnny Rotten	5:35

Enhanced CD 2 bonus track
No.	Title	Writer(s)	Length
12.	"Dr. Feelgood" (video)	Sixx; Mars	5:30

== Personnel ==
- Vince Neil – lead vocals, acoustic and rhythm guitar
- Mick Mars – lead guitar, backing vocals
- Nikki Sixx – bass, keyboards, theremin, backing vocals
- Tommy Lee – drums, percussion, piano, backing vocals

== Certifications ==
Region	Certification	Certified units/sales
United States (RIAA)	3× Platinum	300,000^{^}
^{^} Shipments figures based on certification alone.
