= List of awards and nominations received by Mötley Crüe =

List of Mötley Crüe awards and nominations
Award	Wins	Nominations
American Music Awards	1	4
Grammy Awards	0	3
MTV Video Music Awards	0	1
Hollywood Walk Of Fame	Honored
- Totals
Awards won	2
Nominations	8

Mötley Crüe are an American Music Award-winning Heavy Metal/Hard Rock band, and have been nominated for a MTV Video Music Award and three Grammy Award. They were inducted into the Hollywood Walk of Fame in 2006.

== American Music Awards ==
The American Music Awards was created by Dick Clark in 1973 and is awarded annually. Mötley Crüe has received one awards out of four nominations

Year	Nominee / work	Award	Result
1990	Dr. Feelgood	Favorite Heavy Metal/Hard Rock Album	Nominated
1990	Mötley Crüe	Favorite Heavy Metal/Hard Rock Artist	Nominated
1991	Dr. Feelgood	Favorite Heavy Metal/Hard Rock Album	Won
1991	Mötley Crüe	Favorite Heavy Metal/Hard Rock Artist	Nominated

== Grammy Awards ==
The Grammy Awards are awarded annually by the National Academy of Recording Arts and Sciences. Mötley Crüe has received three Grammy nominations.

Year	Nominee / work	Award	Result
1990	"Dr. Feelgood"	Best Hard Rock Performance	Nominated
1991	"Kickstart My Heart"	Best Hard Rock Performance	Nominated
2009	"Saints of Los Angeles"	Best Hard Rock Performance	Nominated

== MTV Video Music Awards ==
The MTV Video Music Awards is an annual awards ceremony established in 1984 by MTV. Mötley Crüe has received one nomination.

Year	Nominee / work	Award	Result
1990	"Kickstart My Heart"	Best Heavy Metal Video	Nominated

== Hollywood Walk of Fame ==
Mötley Crüe was inducted into the Hollywood Walk of Fame in 2006.

Year	Nominee / work	Award	Result
2006	Mötley Crüe	Hollywood Walk of Fame	Honored
