= Mötley Crüe Final Tour =

2014–15 concert tour by Mötley Crüe

- Tour by Mötley Crüe
- Start date: July 2, 2014
- End date: December 31, 2015
- Legs: 2
- No. of shows: 158
- Box office: US$86.1 million

Mötley Crüe concert chronology
- North American Tour (2013); The Final Tour (2014–2015); The Stadium Tour (2022)

The Final Tour was a concert tour by heavy metal band Mötley Crüe. At the time, it had been announced as the band's final tour before their initial hiatus from 2016 until their announced comeback reunion in 2019. Alice Cooper was announced as the opening act for the tour. The first leg of the tour began on July 2, 2014 in Grand Rapids, Michigan and concluded on November 22, 2014 in Spokane, Washington. The band further announced more dates for the second and final leg of the tour, which started February 11, 2015 in Kobe, Japan, and ended with three concerts at Staples Center in the band's hometown of Los Angeles on December 28, 30 and 31, 2015. The Tour was kicked off by a drum solo by Producer Joe of the FreeBeer & Hotwings show.

== Background and development ==
On January 28, 2014, Mötley Crüe held a press conference at Beacher's Madhouse Theater in Hollywood, where they announced a final tour with Alice Cooper as the opening act, and later on added New York City-based band The Raskins as a second opening act for the first leg of the tour. The band became the first to sign a binding legal document known as a "cessation of touring" contract, preventing them from touring beyond the year 2015 under the name Mötley Crüe. The first leg of the Final Tour began on July 2, 2014 in Grand Rapids, Michigan and ended on November 22, 2014 in Spokane, Washington.

In January 2015, the band announced that the Final Tour would keep going through the year of 2015, beginning with a handful of international dates in Japan, Australia, Europe and Rock in Rio for their only date in South America on the tour, followed by 34 more dates in North America to end the year and the tour. Even more North American dates however were later added in April 2015. Then a couple months later in June while in London preparing to perform at three different festivals across Europe, Mötley Crüe and Alice Cooper announced a full set of European dates, with the shows set to take place in November 2015. On July 16, 2015, the band set out on their second North American leg of the Final Tour, beginning with two sold-out nights in Anchorage, Alaska, with the first of the two shows being recorded for an upcoming live album to be released sometime after the tour concludes. They brought along New York City-based band The Cringe as a second opening act for most of the second North American leg of the tour. Drummer Tommy Lee was forced to miss a handful of shows during October 2015 due to a flare up of tendinitis in his wrist. Alice Cooper's drummer Glen Sobel filled in for Lee on drums until he was able to return. Lee was however able to perform the piano parts in the band's hit song "Home, Sweet, Home" during the encore at each of the shows he missed.

The band's final shows were held in different cities throughout the southwest region of the U.S. where the band often played as they were starting out in the early 1980s, leading up to the finales, including a performance in Las Vegas where lead vocalist Vince Neil has most recently been residing, and eventually ended with three nights at the Staples Center in the band's hometown of Los Angeles on December 28, 30 and 31st of 2015. Rumors of an intimate encore performance taking place at the Whisky a Go Go immediately following the band's New Year's Eve performance at Staples Center was dismissed by Mötley Crüe bassist Nikki Sixx in an April 2015 interview.

== Set list ==
The set list was shortened by two songs from the first to the second leg of the tour, no longer playing songs "On With the Show" and "Too Fast for Love". "Too Young to Fall in Love" was also dropped after the fourth concert on the tour's second leg. However, "Louder Than Hell" was then added. The opening song was changed from "Saints of Los Angeles" to "Girls, Girls, Girls".

The following set list was taken from the performance on August 5, 2015 in Saint Paul, Minnesota at Xcel Energy Center:

1. "Girls, Girls, Girls"
2. "Wild Side"
3. "Primal Scream"
4. "Same Ol' Situation (S.O.S.)"
5. "Don't Go Away Mad (Just Go Away)"
6. "Smokin' in the Boys Room"
7. "Looks That Kill"
8. "Mutherfucker of the Year"
9. "Anarchy in the U.K."
10. "Shout at the Devil"
11. "Louder Than Hell"
12. Tommy Lee drum solo
13. Mick Mars guitar solo
14. "Saints of Los Angeles"
15. "Live Wire"
16. "Dr. Feelgood"
17. "Kickstart My Heart"

Encore

18. "Home Sweet Home"

== Shows ==
List of concerts, showing date, city, country, venue, tickets sold, number of available tickets and amount of gross revenue
Date	City	Country	Venue	Opening Acts	Attendance	Revenue
North America
July 2, 2014	Grand Rapids	United States	Van Andel Arena		9,970 / 9,970	$784,507
July 4, 2014 (Note: The show on July 4, 2014 was part of Summerfest.)	Milwaukee	United States	Henry Maier Festival Park		—N/a	—N/a
July 5, 2014	Noblesville	United States	Klipsch Music Center		23,607 / 23,607	$724,733
July 6, 2014	Cincinnati	United States	Riverbend Music Center		—N/a	—N/a
July 8, 2014	Columbus	United States	Schottenstein Center		—N/a	—N/a
July 9, 2014	Maryland Heights	United States	Verizon Wireless Amphitheater		—N/a	—N/a
July 11, 2014	Des Moines	United States	Wells Fargo Arena		12,265 / 12,265	$753,877
July 12, 2014	Wichita	United States	Intrust Bank Arena		7,763 / 7,763	$723,742
July 13, 2014	Tulsa	United States	BOK Center		7,427 / 7,427	$709,567
July 15, 2014	San Antonio	United States	Alamodome		—N/a	—N/a
July 16, 2014	Dallas	United States	Gexa Energy Pavilion		17,320 / 17,320	$704,875
July 18, 2014	Albuquerque	United States	Isleta Amphitheater		—N/a	—N/a
July 19, 2014	Phoenix	United States	Ak-Chin Pavilion		18,394 / 18,394	$650,994
July 21, 2014	Los Angeles	United States	Hollywood Bowl		16,488 / 16,488	$1,333,614
July 22, 2014	Irvine	United States	Verizon Wireless Amphitheatre		14,169 / 14,169	$656,818
July 23, 2014	Mountain View	United States	Shoreline Amphitheatre		—N/a	—N/a
July 25, 2014	Reno	United States	Reno Events Center		—N/a	—N/a
July 26, 2014	Ridgefield	United States	Sleep Country Amphitheater		14,817 / 14,817	$699,522
July 27, 2014	Auburn	United States	White River Amphitheatre		—N/a	—N/a
July 29, 2014	Wheatland	United States	Sleep Train Amphitheatre		—N/a	—N/a
July 30, 2014	Chula Vista	United States	Sleep Train Amphitheatre		—N/a	—N/a
August 1, 2014	West Valley City	United States	USANA Amphitheatre		18,940 / 18,940	$770,300
August 2, 2014	Denver	United States	Pepsi Center		12,311 / 12,311	$861,208
August 3, 2014	Kansas City	United States	Sprint Center		12,246 / 12,246	$843,957
August 5, 2014 (Note: The show on August 5, 2014 was part of the Sturgis Motorcycle Rally.)	Sturgis	United States	Buffalo Chip Campground		—N/a	—N/a
August 6, 2014	Sioux City	United States	Tyson Events Center		—N/a	—N/a
August 8, 2014	Tinley Park	United States	First Midwest Bank Amphitheatre		25,097 / 25,097	$948,742
August 9, 2014	Clarkston	United States	DTE Energy Music Theatre		14,617 / 14,617	$611,119
August 10, 2014	Toronto	Canada	Molson Canadian Amphitheatre		15,259 / 15,259	$729,401
August 12, 2014	Cuyahoga Falls	United States	Blossom Music Center		—N/a	—N/a
August 13, 2014	Burgettstown	United States	First Niagara Pavilion		—N/a	—N/a
August 15, 2014	Pelham	United States	Oak Mountain Amphitheatre		—N/a	—N/a
August 16, 2014	Alpharetta	United States	Verizon Wireless Amphitheatre at Encore Park		12,082 / 12,082	$925,905
August 17, 2014	Tampa	United States	MidFlorida Credit Union Amphitheatre		15,401 / 15,401	$664,960
August 19, 2014	Charlotte	United States	PNC Music Pavilion		—N/a	—N/a
August 20, 2014	Virginia Beach	United States	Farm Bureau Live at Virginia Beach		—N/a	—N/a
August 22, 2014	Bristow	United States	Jiffy Lube Live		16,734 / 18,000	$765,045
August 23, 2014	Camden	United States	Susquehanna Bank Center		—N/a	—N/a
August 24, 2014	Mansfield	United States	Xfinity Center		18,269 / 18,269	$825,698
August 26, 2014	Saratoga Springs	United States	Saratoga Performing Arts Center		—N/a	—N/a
August 27, 2014 (Note: The show on August 27, 2014 was part of the Great Allentown Fair.)	Allentown	United States	Allentown Fairgrounds		—N/a	—N/a
August 29, 2014	Wantagh	United States	Nikon at Jones Beach Theater		13,322 / 13,322	$815,376
August 30, 2014	Holmdel Township	United States	PNC Bank Arts Center		16,470 / 16,470	$730,600
August 31, 2014	Darien	United States	Darien Lake Performing Arts Center		—N/a	—N/a
October 10, 2014	Oklahoma City	United States	Chesapeake Energy Arena		—N/a	—N/a
October 11, 2014	The Woodlands	United States	Cynthia Woods Mitchell Pavilion		15,866 / 15,866	$696,095
October 12, 2014	Bossier City	United States	CenturyLink Center		—N/a	—N/a
October 14, 2014	Louisville	United States	KFC Yum! Center		—N/a	—N/a
October 15, 2014	Nashville	United States	Bridgestone Arena		11,513 / 11,513	$725,993
October 17, 2014	Hollywood	United States	Hard Rock Live		9,981 / 9,981	$751,425
October 18, 2014	Hollywood	United States	Hard Rock Live		9,981 / 9,981	$751,425
October 19, 2014	Jacksonville	United States	Jacksonville Veterans Memorial Arena		—N/a	—N/a
October 21, 2014	Greenville	United States	Bon Secours Wellness Arena		—N/a	—N/a
October 22, 2014	Greensboro	United States	Greensboro Coliseum		—N/a	—N/a
October 25, 2014	Atlantic City	United States	The Borgata		—N/a	—N/a
October 26, 2014	Uncasville	United States	Mohegan Sun Arena		—N/a	—N/a
October 28, 2014	New York	United States	Madison Square Garden		11,423 / 11,423	$1,082,041
October 29, 2014	Syracuse	United States	Oncenter War Memorial Arena		—N/a	—N/a
November 5, 2014	Biloxi	United States	Mississippi Coast Coliseum		—N/a	—N/a
November 6, 2014	Southaven	United States	Lander's Center		—N/a	—N/a
November 8, 2014	Detroit	United States	Joe Louis Arena		13,469 / 13,469	$988,580
November 9, 2014	Moline	United States	iWireless Center		—N/a	—N/a
November 11, 2014	Green Bay	United States	Resch Center		—N/a	—N/a
November 12, 2014	Madison	United States	Veterans Memorial Coliseum		—N/a	—N/a
November 13, 2014	Omaha	United States	CenturyLink Center		11,880 / 11,880	$734,894
November 15, 2014	Saint Paul	United States	Xcel Energy Center		14,514 / 14,514	$860,949
November 16, 2014	Fargo	United States	Fargodome		—N/a	—N/a
November 18, 2014	Edmonton	Canada	Rexall Place		12,269 / 12,269	$945,547
November 19, 2014	Calgary	Canada	Scotiabank Saddledome		11,163 / 11,163	$871,371
November 21, 2014	Vancouver	Canada	Rogers Arena		13,025 / 13,025	$1,057,420
November 22, 2014	Spokane	United States	Spokane Arena		10,410 / 10,410	$671,554
Asia
February 11, 2015	Kobe	Japan	Kobe World Memorial Hall		—N/a	—N/a
February 12, 2015	Nagoya	Japan	Nihon Gaishi Hall		—N/a	—N/a
February 14, 2015	Tokyo	Japan	Saitama Super Arena		—N/a	—N/a
February 15, 2015	Tokyo	Japan	Saitama Super Arena		—N/a	—N/a
February 17, 2015	Fukuoka	Japan	Fukuoka Convention Center		—N/a	—N/a
Oceania
May 9, 2015	Auckland	New Zealand	Vector Arena		—	—
May 12, 2015	Melbourne	Australia	Rod Laver Arena		16,053 / 16,053	$1,201,160
May 13, 2015	Melbourne	Australia	Rod Laver Arena		16,053 / 16,053	$1,201,160
May 16, 2015	Sydney	Australia	Allphones Arena		10,190 / 10,190	$975,332
May 19, 2015	Brisbane	Australia	Brisbane Entertainment Centre		6,819 / 6,819	$621,788
May 21, 2015	Adelaide	Australia	Adelaide Entertainment Centre		—	—
May 23, 2015	Perth	Australia	Perth Arena		7,366 / 7,366	$656,462
Europe
June 5, 2015 (Note: The show on June 5, 2015 was part of the Sweden Rock Festival.)	Sölvesborg	Sweden	Sweden Rock Festival Grounds		—N/a	—N/a
June 12, 2015 (Note: The show on June 12, 2015 was part of the Nova Rock Festival.)	Nickelsdorf	Austria	Pannonia Fields		—N/a	—N/a
June 14, 2015 (Note: The show on June 14, 2015 was part of Download Festival.)	Castle Donington	England	Donington Park		—N/a	—N/a
North America
July 16, 2015	Anchorage	United States	Alaska Airlines Center			
July 17, 2015	Anchorage	United States	Alaska Airlines Center			
July 22, 2015	Eugene	United States	Matthew Knight Arena			
July 24, 2015	Tacoma	United States	Tacoma Dome			
July 25, 2015 (Note: The show on July 25, 2015 was part of California Mid State Fair.)	Paso Robles	United States	Chumash Grandstand Arena			
July 26, 2015	Billings	United States	Rimrock Auto Arena at MetraPark			
July 28, 2015	Boise	United States	Taco Bell Arena			
July 29, 2015	Salt Lake City	United States	EnergySolutions Arena			
July 31, 2015	Denver	United States	Pepsi Center			
August 3, 2015	Winnipeg	Canada	MTS Centre			
August 5, 2015	Saint Paul	United States	Xcel Energy Center			
August 7, 2015	Milwaukee	United States	BMO Harris Bradley Center			
August 8, 2015	Rosemont	United States	Allstate Arena			
August 9, 2015	Auburn Hills	United States	The Palace of Auburn Hills		10,542 / 13,065	$754,680
August 11, 2015	Hershey	United States	Giant Center			
August 12, 2015	Brooklyn	United States	Barclays Center			
August 14, 2015	Philadelphia	United States	Wells Fargo Center		9,745 / 12,000	$699,211
August 15, 2015	Worcester	United States	DCU Center			
August 16, 2015	Uncasville	United States	Mohegan Sun Arena		6,703 / 6,972	$631,941
August 18, 2015	Cleveland	United States	Quicken Loans Arena			
August 19, 2015	Cincinnati	United States	U.S. Bank Arena			
August 20, 2015	Indianapolis	United States	Bankers Life Fieldhouse			
August 22, 2015	Toronto	Canada	Air Canada Centre		12,113 / 12,113	$858,246
August 23, 2015	Ottawa	Canada	Canadian Tire Centre			
August 24, 2015	Montreal	Canada	Bell Centre			
August 26, 2015	Baltimore	United States	Royal Farms Arena			
August 28, 2015	Raleigh	United States	PNC Arena			
August 29, 2015	Charlotte	United States	Time Warner Cable Arena			
August 30, 2015	Atlanta	United States	Philips Arena			
September 2, 2015	Miami	United States	American Airlines Arena			
September 4, 2015	New Orleans	United States	Smoothie King Center			
September 5, 2015	Houston	United States	Toyota Center			
September 6, 2015	San Antonio	United States	Alamodome			
September 8, 2015	Monterrey	Mexico	Arena Monterrey			
September 10, 2015	Mexico City	Mexico	Mexico City Arena			
South America
September 19, 2015 (Note: The show on September 19, 2015 was part of Rock in Rio.)	Rio de Janeiro	Brazil	City of Rock		85,000 / 85,000	—N/a
North America
October 5, 2015	Hidalgo	United States	State Farm Arena			
October 7, 2015	Dallas	United States	American Airlines Center		10,634 / 13,544	$654,583
October 8, 2015	Little Rock	United States	Verizon Arena			
October 10, 2015	Evansville	United States	Ford Center			
October 11, 2015	Lexington	United States	Rupp Arena			
October 13, 2015	Toledo	United States	Huntington Center			
October 14, 2015	Buffalo	United States	First Niagara Center			
October 16, 2015	Bridgeport	United States	Webster Bank Arena			
October 17, 2015	Manchester	United States	Verizon Wireless Arena			
October 18, 2015	Bangor	United States	Cross Insurance Center			
October 20, 2015	Quebec City	Canada	Videotron Centre			
Europe
November 2, 2015	Newcastle	England	Metro Radio Arena			
November 3, 2015	Manchester	England	Manchester Arena			
November 4, 2015	Birmingham	England	Genting Arena			
November 6, 2015	London	England	Wembley Arena			
November 8, 2015	Stuttgart	Germany	Hanns-Martin-Schleyer-Halle			
November 9, 2015	Basel	Switzerland	St. Jakob Arena			
November 10, 2015	Milan	Italy	Mediolanum Forum			
November 12, 2015	Monte Carlo	Monaco	Sporting Club			
November 13, 2015	Munich	Germany	Zenith			
November 14, 2015	Düsseldorf	Germany	ISS Dome			
November 16, 2015	Stockholm	Sweden	Ericsson Globe			
November 18, 2015	Helsinki	Finland	Hartwall Arena			
Middle East
November 20, 2015	Abu Dhabi	United Arab Emirates	Du Arena			
North America
December 4, 2015	Lincoln	United States	Pinnacle Bank Arena			
December 7, 2015	Sioux Falls	United States	Denny Sanford Premier Center			
December 8, 2015	Minneapolis	United States	Target Center		5,410 / 7,900	$349,550
December 10, 2015	Saskatoon	Canada	SaskTel Centre			
December 12, 2015	Edmonton	Canada	Rexall Place			
December 13, 2015	Calgary	Canada	Scotiabank Saddledome			
December 15, 2015	Portland	United States	Moda Center			
December 17, 2015	Fresno	United States	Save Mart Center		6,776 / 9,474	$484,518
December 19, 2015	Phoenix	United States	Talking Stick Resort Arena			
December 20, 2015	San Diego	United States	Viejas Arena			
December 22, 2015	Anaheim	United States	Honda Center			
December 27, 2015	Las Vegas	United States	MGM Grand Garden Arena	The Struts		
December 28, 2015	Los Angeles	United States	Staples Center	The Struts	37,090 / 41,739	$2,760,290
December 30, 2015	Los Angeles	United States	Staples Center	The Struts	37,090 / 41,739	$2,760,290
December 31, 2015	Los Angeles	United States	Staples Center	The Struts	37,090 / 41,739	$2,760,290
Total					547,322 / 566,113 (96%)	$32,192,928

== Gross ==
- Total Gross: $86.1 million
- Total Attendance: 1,358,423
- Shows: 158
