= The Dirt (film) =

2019 film by Jeff Tremaine

- Official release poster
- Directed by: Jeff Tremaine
- Written by: Rich Wilkes; Amanda Adelson
- Based on: The Dirt: Confessions of the World's Most Notorious Rock Band (2001) by Neil Strauss; Tommy Lee; Mick Mars; Vince Neil; Nikki Sixx
- Produced by: Allen Kovac; Erik Olsen; Julie Yorn; Rick Yorn
- Starring: Douglas Booth; Colson Baker; Daniel Webber; Iwan Rheon; Pete Davidson
- Cinematography: Toby Oliver
- Edited by: Melissa Kent
- Music by: Paul Haslinger
- Production companies: 10th Street Entertainment; LBI Entertainment
- Distributed by: Netflix
- Release dates: March 18, 2019 (Hollywood); March 22, 2019 (United States)
- Running time: 108 minutes
- Country: United States
- Language: English
- Budget: $23.1 million

The Dirt is a 2019 American biographical comedy-drama film directed by Jeff Tremaine and written by Rich Wilkes and Amanda Adelson, about heavy metal/glam metal band Mötley Crüe. The film stars Douglas Booth, Colson Baker, Daniel Webber, and Iwan Rheon.

Talks of a Mötley Crüe biopic began as early as 2006, when Paramount Pictures and MTV Films purchased the rights to the book The Dirt: Confessions of the World's Most Notorious Rock Band (2001) by the band and Neil Strauss; however, the project then languished in development hell for over a decade, going through numerous directors and cast members before Netflix purchased the rights in March 2017. Filming began around New Orleans in February 2018.

The Dirt was released digitally on Netflix on March 22, 2019. It received generally negative reviews from critics, who said the film would please fans but that it hesitated "in handling the more troubling aspects of the band's history."

== Plot ==
In 1973, Frank Carlton Feranna Jr. walks away from his mother Deana after years of abuse and moves from Seattle to Los Angeles in 1978. After a failed attempt to connect with his biological father who abandoned the family at birth, Frank legally changes his name to "Nikki Sixx" in 1980. A year later, after a falling out with members of London at the Whisky a Go Go, Nikki befriends drummer Tommy Lee and reveals to him that he is forming a new band. Joining the band is guitarist Mick Mars, who has ankylosing spondylitis. The trio then recruit Tommy's high school friend Vince Neil from the cover band Rock Candy as lead vocalist, and after some brainstorming, the quartet name themselves Mötley Crüe.

Despite a brawl with some crowd members, Mötley Crüe's first gig at the Starwood is well-received. They progressively sell out night clubs all over Los Angeles and rookie producer Tom Zutaut of Elektra Records approaches them with a five-album deal. The band signs Doc McGhee as their manager. During their first national tour, they are given advice by Ozzy Osbourne to know the limits of their partying before he snorts a line of ants and licks his and Nikki's urine on the pool floor. Before long, the band's albums go platinum and they each spend millions of dollars as fast as they earn them. Vince marries mud wrestler Sharise Ruddell, while Tommy announces his engagement to a woman named Roxie, but after his mother calls her a groupie, they get into a heated argument and Tommy punches Roxie in the face.

On December 8, 1984, during a party at Vince's home in Redondo Beach, Tommy meets Heather Locklear, while a drunk Vince and Hanoi Rocks drummer Razzle drive out to buy more drinks. They get into a car accident that kills Razzle, and has Vince sentenced to 30 days in jail for vehicular manslaughter, which is subsequently reduced to 19 days. Nikki becomes addicted to heroin and starts to display destructive behavior towards his bandmates. He fires McGhee for bringing Deana to visit him. On December 23, 1987, shortly after Tommy and Heather's wedding, Nikki overdoses on heroin and is initially declared dead, but a paramedic who is a fan of the band brings him back to life with two shots of adrenaline. Following this, Nikki has the band go to rehab. A sober Mötley Crüe rebounds in 1989 with Dr. Feelgood, which becomes their first number one album on the Billboard 200, followed by a lengthy world tour. The months of touring and staying sober take their toll on Vince and Tommy, who resort to drinking again after being away from their families for too long.

Following the tour, Vince discovers that Sharise and their daughter Skylar have left him, causing him to miss several rehearsals and eventually part ways with the band in 1992. The band then hires John Corabi as his replacement. In 1995, Skylar dies of stomach cancer at the age of four, while Heather divorces Tommy after his affair with a porn star from two years earlier comes to light. Mick starts to abuse painkillers as the disease is starting to overwhelm his body and movement. Seeing the backlash by fans over Vince's departure from the band, Nikki negotiates with Zutaut to give them back the rights to their songs in exchange for their release from Elektra Records. After visiting his father's grave, Nikki regroups with Tommy and Mick, who has had hip surgery, before they reconcile with Vince. Mötley Crüe would perform together for another 20 years, playing their final show on New Year's Eve 2015.

== Cast ==
- Douglas Booth as Nikki Sixx, Mötley Crüe's bassist

- Trace Masters and Vince Robert Mattis play eight-year-old and 14-year-old Sixx (then known by his birth name of Frank Feranna Jr.), respectively

- Iwan Rheon as Mick Mars, Mötley Crüe's guitarist who has Ankylosing spondylitis
- Colson Baker as Tommy Lee, Mötley Crüe's drummer
- Daniel Webber as Vince Neil, Mötley Crüe's lead vocalist

- Timmy Cherry as Neil's singing voice

- Pete Davidson as Tom Zutaut, an Elektra Records executive
- David Costabile as Doc McGhee, Mötley Crüe’s longtime manager
- Leven Rambin as Sharise Ruddell-Neil, Vince’s wife who is a mud wrestler and a model
- Kathryn Morris as Deana Richards, Nikki's estranged mother
- Rebekah Graf as Heather Locklear, Tommy's second wife
- Tony Cavalero as Ozzy Osbourne, former lead vocalist of Black Sabbath struggling with drug addiction who headlined one of Mötley Crüe's earlier tours
- Max Milner as Razzle, drummer of Hanoi Rocks
- Katherine Neff as Lovey, Vince's first girlfriend
- Jordan Lane Price as Roxie, Tommy's first fiancée, who prior to their breakup was having an affair with Nikki
- Christian Gehring as David Lee Roth, lead vocalist of Van Halen
- Anthony Vincent Valbiro as John Corabi, Mötley Crüe's second lead vocalist (1992–95) after Vince's departure from the band
- Kamryn Ragsdale as Skylar Neil, Vince's daughter who died of cancer

- Iris D'Aquin and Lyra D'Aquin play two-year-old Skylar

- Melanie Hebert as an MTV VJ
- Courtney Dietz as Athena Lee, a musician and Tommy’s younger sister
- Joe Chrest as David Lee, Tommy’s father
- Elena Evangelo as Voula Lee, Tommy’s mother
- Michael Hodson as Rodney Feranna, Nikki's half-brother
- Alyssa Marie Stilwell as Kayla

The real Mötley Crüe appears in archival footage during the ending credits.

== Production ==
In 2006, film adaptation rights to the autobiography book The Dirt: Confessions of the World's Most Notorious Rock Band, authored by Neil Strauss with Tommy Lee, Mick Mars, Vince Neil and Nikki Sixx, were bought by Paramount Pictures and MTV Films. At the time, Larry Charles was tapped to direct the film. However, production on the film stalled and in 2008 Sixx spoke of his frustration in an interview stating:

"We're trying to get them out of the way to make this movie that should have been made a long time ago. MTV has become bogged down in its own way. It's a channel that used to be hip and has now actually become unhip. We signed with them because we believed they were right, but they haven't come to the table. We need to find the right partner. They are not the right partner."

In November 2013, Jeff Tremaine signed on to helm The Dirt, with the film having been dropped by MTV Films and Paramount Pictures. In January 2015, Focus Features picked up rights to the film. However, production languished in development hell until March 2017, when Netflix bought worldwide rights to the film. At the time, Liam Hemsworth, Emory Cohen and Douglas Booth were being eyed for lead roles in the film. In November 2017, Booth officially signed on to star in the film. In January 2018, Machine Gun Kelly, Iwan Rheon and Daniel Webber joined the cast. In February 2018, Tony Cavalero joined the cast. In March 2018, Rebekah Graf, Leven Rambin, and David Costabile joined the cast.

Principal production commenced in February 2018 in New Orleans, Louisiana.

=== Accident ===
On March 11, 2018, Louis DiVincenti, a rigging grip for the production team, suffered an electric shock while de-rigging a set during the New Orleans shoot. According to DiVincenti, he was passing metal pipes to other crew members when one pipe he held made contact with a nearby power line, causing an electric current that arced through his body and blew out through his right foot. As a result, he sustained second- and third-degree burns over 50 percent of his body, which required numerous surgeries and skin grafts, and his right foot had to be amputated. On March 1, 2019, DiVincenti sued Netflix and Mötley Crüe for $1.8 million to compensate for his medical bills.

=== Marketing ===
The trailer was released on February 19, 2019 and featured glimpses of some of the stories including the infamous hotel television throwing incident, Vince Neil's vehicular manslaughter charges in 1984, and Nikki Sixx's drug overdose in 1987.

== Critical reception ==
On Rotten Tomatoes, the film holds an approval rating of 38% based on 74 reviews, with an average rating of 4.6/10. The website's critical consensus reads, "The Dirt celebrates the rude debauchery that Mötley Crüe's fans enjoy – but does so with the dispiriting lack of substance that the group's critics have long decried." On Metacritic the film has a weighted average score of 39 out of 100, based on 17 critics, indicating "general unfavorable reviews".

David Fear of Rolling Stone gave the film a rating of two out of five stars, saying that "This is rock bad-boy lore as a rocking bore, an endless parade of recreated afterparty ecstasy and emptiness that robs The Dirt of the vicarious thrill it had on the page — the sense that you shouldn’t be having this much of a second-hand high reading about musicians acting like horrible people but still seeming living-the-dream heroic." Owen Gleiberman of Variety called the film "a thinly written, generically staged VH1-style sketchbook of a movie — which is to say, it's a Netflix film, with zero atmosphere, overly blunt lighting, and a threadbare post-psychological telegraphed quality that gives you nothing to read between the lines." Brian Tallerico of RogerEbert.com gave the film one out of four stars, saying that "You could listen to Dr. Feelgood two full times during the run time of The Dirt and learn just about as much about the band as you do in this R-rated Wikipedia article of a movie. And you'd have way more fun."

Chris Nashawaty of Entertainment Weekly gave the film a B, saying that "This movie won't win any awards. Nor should it. But for two hours it's a nostalgic blast to sit back and revel in the idiocy of these glorious, big-haired jackasses." Rafer Guzmán of Newsday gave the film three out of four stars, calling it "a funny, foul-mouthed, whirlwind ride through one of the last great eras in rock history, when wretched excess was part of the job description and bad behavior was a badge of honor."

== Soundtrack ==
The Dirt Soundtrack was released by Mötley Records and Eleven Seven Records on March 22, 2019, on CD, LP, and digital formats.
