= Treat Me Like the Dog I Am =

Single by Mötley Crüe

from the album New Tattoo
- Released: 2000
- Recorded: 2000
- Genre: Glam metal, hard rock
- Length: 3:40
- Label: Mötley Records
- Songwriters: Nikki Sixx, Vince Neil

Mötley Crüe singles chronology
"New Tattoo" (2000)	"Treat Me Like the Dog I Am" (2000)	"If I Die Tomorrow" (2005)

"Treat Me Like the Dog I Am" is a song by American heavy metal band Mötley Crüe released as the third and final single of their 2000 studio album New Tattoo which charted at #41 on the Billboard 200 and #3 on the Top Internet Albums chart. This is the last single to feature Randy Castillo on drums before his death in 2002.

== Track listing ==
1. Treat Me Like the Dog I Am

== Personnel ==
- Vince Neil - Lead vocals, Rhythm Guitar
- Nikki Sixx - Bass Guitar, Backing Vocals, Keyboards
- Randy Castillo - Drums
- Mick Mars - Lead Guitar, Backing Vocals
