= Raw Tracks =

EP by Mötley Crüe
- Released: 25 June 1988 (I); 10 May 1990 (II)
- Genre: Glam metal
- Length: 23:36 (Raw Tracks I) 25:16 (Raw Tracks II)
- Label: Elektra
- Producer: Mötley Crüe, Tom Werman, Bob Rock

Mötley Crüe chronology
Girls, Girls Girls (1987)	Raw Tracks (1988)	Dr. Feelgood (1989)

Professional ratings
Review scores
Source	Rating
AllMusic	2/5 stars
AllMusic (Raw Tracks Vol.2)	2.5/5 stars

Raw Tracks is a duo of EPs by American heavy metal band Mötley Crüe released exclusively in Japan in 1988 and 1990.

== Overview ==
The first EP disc features two songs presented in their original Leathür Records mix from their debut album, two remixes and one live version of tracks previously issued on the group's previous records.

The second EP disc features two live tracks, a cover and two studio tracks from previous albums.

== Track listing ==
No.	Title	Writer(s)	previously released	Length
1.	"Live Wire" (Original Leathür Mix)	Nikki Sixx	Too Fast For Love (Leathür Records edition)	3:18
2.	"Piece of Your Action" (Original Leathür Mix)	Vince Neil, Sixx	Too Fast For Love (Leathür Records edition)	4:42
3.	"Too Young to Fall in Love" (Remix)	Sixx	Too Young to Fall in Love (Remix) (Single)	3:39
4.	"Knock 'Em Dead, Kid"	Neil, Sixx	Shout at the Devil	3:44
5.	"Home Sweet Home" (Remix)	Neil, Tommy Lee, Sixx	Home Sweet Home (Remix) (Promo single)	3:54
6.	"Smokin' in the Boys Room" (Live)	Cub Koda, Michael Lutz	Girls, Girls, Girls (Single)	4:19
Total length:				23:36

=== Raw Tracks II ===
No.	Title	Writer(s)	Length
1.	"Teaser" (Tommy Bolin cover)	Tommy Bolin, Jeff Cook	5:19
2.	"All in the Name of ..." (live)	Neil, Sixx	5:04
3.	"Girls, Girls, Girls" (live)	Sixx, Lee, Mick Mars	5:50
4.	"Slice of Your Pie"	Sixx, Mars	4:33
5.	"Without You"	Sixx, Mars	4:30
Total length:			25:16

== Personnel ==
=== Raw Tracks ===
Mötley Crüe

- Vince Neil – lead vocals, harmonica
- Mick Mars – guitar, backing vocals
- Nikki Sixx – bass, synthesizer, backing vocals
- Tommy Lee – drums, piano, backing vocals

Technical personnel

- Mötley Crüe – production (tracks 1 and 2)
- Tom Werman – production (tracks 3–6)
- William Hames – photography

=== Raw Tracks II ===
Mötley Crüe

- Vince Neil – lead vocals
- Mick Mars – guitar, backing vocals
- Nikki Sixx – bass, backing vocals
- Tommy Lee – drums

Technical personnel

- Bruce Fairbairn – production (track 1)
- Bob Rock – production (tracks 4 and 5)
- William Hames – photography
