= Melanie Hebert =

American journalist

Melanie Ann Hebert (born in Marrero, Louisiana, United States) is an American journalist from New Orleans. She has anchored the weekday morning news at NBC affiliate WDSU, CBS affiliate WWL-TV, ABC affiliate KESQ, and NBC affiliate WVLA. Hebert has also appeared in several films and TV shows as a news reporter.

== Career ==
Hebert's TV career began behind the scenes in Los Angeles with the entertainment news magazine Extra before she returned to Louisiana to join WVLA-TV, the NBC affiliate in Baton Rouge, as one of the youngest news anchors in the U.S. During this time, she also covered several major news stories as a reporter including Hurricane Katrina and its aftermath. She co-anchored a two-week special for the Olympics, "Baton Rouge to Athens", on which she also served as Executive Producer.

Hebert's success in Baton Rouge and the national attention generated by Hurricane Katrina led her to return to California in 2005 where she became the morning and noon anchor for KESQ-TV in Palm Springs. The morning news team received an Emmy Award for coverage of the devastating wildfires in California. Hebert freelanced in Hollywood as a reporter in the film industry, and she traveled home to New Orleans to produce several stories for KESQ on the first anniversary of Hurricane Katrina.

In June 2008, Hebert once more returned to Louisiana to join the WDSU NewsChannel 6 team in New Orleans as the morning anchor.

She has also served as the Director of Publicity for the Baton Rouge Ballet Theatre and has been involved in charity work with Big Brothers Big Sisters, United Way, and Louisiana Amyotrophic Lateral Sclerosis Association.

== Education ==
Melanie Hebert attended St. Mary's Dominican High School and the New Orleans Center for Creative Arts before attending Louisiana State University in Baton Rouge. At LSU she earned a Bachelor of Arts in Mass Communication and was a member and captain of the Golden Girls dance team while she also studied dance at NYU's Tisch School of the Arts.

In 2001 Hebert was voted by the LSU student body to be crowned Homecoming Queen.

== Filmography ==
=== Film ===
- Green Lantern (2011) - News reporter
- Get Hard (2015) - News reporter
- The Free World (2016) - News reporter
- The Dirt (2019) - MTV VJ

=== Television ===
- Reckless (2014) - News anchor (ep. 1, "Pilot")
- Zoo (2015) - News reporter
