= Saints of Los Angeles =

Studio album by Mötley Crüe
- Released: June 24, 2008
- Recorded: 2007–2008
- Studios: The Lightning Bolt Garage, Los Angeles, California
- Genres: Heavy metal; glam metal
- Length: 44:03
- Labels: Mötley; Eleven Seven
- Producers: James Michael; Nikki Sixx; Daren Jay Ashba

Mötley Crüe chronology
Carnival of Sins Live (2006)	Saints of Los Angeles (2008)	Greatest Hits (2009)

Singles from Saints of Los Angeles
- 1. "Saints of Los Angeles" Released: April 11, 2008; 2. "Mutherfucker of the Year" Released: August 25, 2008; 3. "White Trash Circus" Released: February 25, 2009

Saints of Los Angeles is the ninth studio album by the American heavy metal band Mötley Crüe, released on June 24, 2008, by Mötley Records and Eleven Seven Music. This was the only full-length studio album with the band's original lineup since 1997's Generation Swine, following the return of drummer Tommy Lee, the last to feature guitarist Mick Mars before his dismissal from Mötley Crüe in 2022, and the last before their initial dissolution in 2015. Following its release, the band has concentrated on releasing singles over albums, although they didn't rule out future albums.

Saints of Los Angeles debuted at No. 4 on the Billboard chart, selling about 100,000 copies in its first week. It debuted at No. 14 on the Australian ARIA chart, No. 5 in Sweden, No. 3 in Canada, No. 47 in Italy, and No. 9 in Finland (although it climbed to number 6 in its second week).

The album's first single, its title track, was their second highest-charting single in the US mainstream rock charts, peaking at number 5. However, subsequent singles fared less well: "Mutherfucker of the Year" peaked at number 29 and "White Trash Circus" at number 37 on mainstream rock charts.

== Writing and recording ==
Bassist Nikki Sixx stated in his blog that he believed the band were "on to some of the better songs we've had in years". A tentative working title – The Dirt – was eventually scrapped. "The album is loosely based on The Dirt," said Sixx. "Each song is like a mini-story, and you can plug it into the book. Some of its funny, some of its serious and in-your-face. It's like a typical, successful Mötley Crüe record."

The album features production and songwriting from members of Sixx's other band Sixx:A.M., as singer James Michael and guitarist DJ Ashba are involved in almost every song. Frequent Aerosmith collaborator Marti Frederiksen also was heavily involved with the songwriting process. Though it was not well known at the time, Ashba's contributions to the album were quite substantial, as he performed the vast majority of the guitar work on the album while Mick Mars' work was discarded. Sixx later confirmed that almost every guitar part was played by Ashba, saying that Mars "couldn't play his parts or remember his parts" in the studio.

== Critical reception ==
Professional ratings
Aggregate scores
Source	Rating
Metacritic	54/100
Review scores
Source	Rating
AllMusic	3/5 stars
Consequence of Sound	D
Los Angeles Times	1.5/4 stars
Now	1/5 stars
Q	2/5 stars
Rolling Stone	3/5 stars
Record Collector	4/5 stars
The Skinny	2/5 stars
Sputnikmusic	3/5 stars
Uncut	2/5 stars

Saints of Los Angeles was met with "mixed or average" reviews from critics. At Metacritic, which assigns a weighted average rating out of 100 to reviews from mainstream publications, this release received an average score of 54 based on 11 reviews.

In a review for AllMusic, critic reviewer James Christopher Monger wrote: "Mötley Crüe have been trumpeting their hedonism for so long and so loudly that it's become more of a caricature than a way of life, and while Saints of Los Angeles is the best thing they've laid to tape since their codpiece heydays, it's more of a walk down memory lane/Sunset Strip than a legitimate call to arms." Bram Teitelman of Billboard said: "While not every song is a winner, the title track and sleaze anthem "This Ain't a Love Song" are standouts.

== Tours ==
Two tours, Crüe Fest and the Saints of Los Angeles Tour, supported the album. Crüe Fest ran during the summer of 2008, with supporting bands Buckcherry, Papa Roach, Sixx:A.M., and Trapt. The Saints of Los Angeles Tour ran during early 2009 and supporting bands were Hinder, Theory of a Deadman, and the Last Vegas.

== Track listing ==
All tracks are written by Nikki Sixx, James Michael, DJ Ashba, and Marti Frederiksen, except 1 (no credited writer(s)), 6–10 and 12 (Sixx, Michael, Ashba, Mick Mars, Frederiksen, Mick Mars), and 11 (Sixx, Mars, Tommy Lee, Michael, Frederiksen).

No.	Title	Length
1.	"L.A.M.F."	1:23
2.	"Face Down in the Dirt"	3:44
3.	"What's It Gonna Take"	3:45
4.	"Down at the Whisky"	3:50
5.	"Saints of Los Angeles" (Gang Vocal Version)	3:40
6.	"Mutherfucker of the Year"	3:55
7.	"The Animal in Me"	4:16
8.	"Welcome to the Machine"	3:00
9.	"Just Another Psycho"	3:36
10.	"Chicks = Trouble"	3:13
11.	"This Ain't a Love Song"	3:25
12.	"White Trash Circus"	2:51
13.	"Goin' Out Swingin'"	3:27

== Singles ==
The first single, "Saints of Los Angeles", was released on April 11 and started airing on radio stations on April 15, 2008. The song was given further promotion through the music video game Rock Band, being released as downloadable content on the Xbox Live Marketplace and PlayStation Store on the same day. A video for the single was premiered at a press conference by the band on April 15. The song was performed on Jimmy Kimmel Live! and the Late Show with David Letterman. Jacoby Shaddix from Papa Roach, Josh Todd from Buckcherry, Chris Brown from Trapt, and James Michael from Sixx:A.M. all make cameos at the end of the video. This act had also been done as the band performed the song on their previous Crüe Fest tour. The song was featured in commercials and in promos for X-Games 14. The single version of "Saints of Los Angeles" does not include the backing vocals and the introduction from the gang vocal version. The title track was nominated for a Grammy Award for Best Hard Rock Performance but lost; it was Mötley Crüe's third nomination. Their previous nominations for "Dr. Feelgood" and "Kickstart My Heart" in the same category saw losses to Living Colour. The January 2009 issue of PlayStation: The Official Magazine lists Mötley Crüe's "Saints of Los Angeles" as fifth on its list of "Rock Band’s Five Most Unexpectedly Rockin' Downloadable Songs".

"Mutherfucker of the Year" was the second single to be taken from "Saints of Los Angeles" followed by "White Trash Circus".

== Personnel ==
Mötley Crüe

- Vince Neil – vocals
- Mick Mars – lead guitar
- Nikki Sixx – bass
- Tommy Lee – drums

Additional musicians

- James Michael – keyboards, backing vocals
- Marti Frederiksen, Melissa Harding – backing vocals
- Josh Todd, Jacoby Shaddix, James Michael, Chris Taylor Brown – backing vocals on gang vocal version of "Saints of Los Angeles"
- DJ Ashba – rhythm guitar [uncredited]

Production

- James Michael – production, engineering, mixing
- DJ Ashba – co-production, additional engineering
- Viggy Vignola – additional engineering
- Dave Donnelly – mastering

== Charts ==
=== Weekly charts ===
Weekly chart performance for Saints of Los Angeles
Chart (2008)	Peak position
Australian Albums (ARIA)	14
Austrian Albums (Ö3 Austria)	73
Canadian Albums (Billboard)	3
Finnish Albums (Suomen virallinen lista)	6
German Albums (Offizielle Top 100)	88
Italian Albums (FIMI)	43
New Zealand Albums (RMNZ)	8
Norwegian Albums (VG-lista)	37
Scottish Albums (Official Charts)	54
Swedish Albums (Sverigetopplistan)	5
Swiss Albums (Schweizer Hitparade)	42
UK Albums (Official Charts)	78
UK Rock & Metal Albums (Official Charts)	6
US Billboard 200	4
US Top Rock Albums (Billboard)	2
US Independent Albums (Billboard)	1
US Top Hard Rock Albums (Billboard)	1
US Indie Store Album Sales (Billboard)	4

=== Year-end charts ===
Year-end chart performance for Saints of Los Angeles
Chart (2008)	Position
US Billboard 200	186
US Top Hard Rock Albums (Billboard)	24

== Certifications ==
Certifications for Saints of Los Angeles
Region	Certification	Certified units/sales
Canada (Music Canada)	Gold	50,000^{^}
^{^} Shipments figures based on certification alone.
