= If I Die Tomorrow =

2005 single by Mötley Crüe

Single by Mötley Crüe

from the album Red, White & Crüe
- Released: 23 May 2005 (UK)
- Genre: Alternative metal, hard rock
- Length: 3:46
- Label: Universal
- Songwriters: Simple Plan; Nikki Sixx
- Producer: Bob Rock

Mötley Crüe singles chronology
"Treat Me Like the Dog I Am" (2001)	"If I Die Tomorrow" (2005)	"Sick Love Song" (2005)

"If I Die Tomorrow" is a song by the American heavy metal band Mötley Crüe released on their 2005 compilation album Red, White & Crüe. The song was one of the new songs recorded by Mötley Crüe for the album and the single charted at number 4 on the Mainstream rock charts. It is the first single since "Beauty" to feature drummer Tommy Lee.

== Composition ==
Originally written by the Canadian pop punk band Simple Plan, "If I Die Tomorrow" was left off their 2004 album Still Not Getting Any... as the band did not feel that it fit in with the rest of the album. After finishing work with Simple Plan, producer Bob Rock brought the song to Mötley Crüe knowing that they were looking to record new material to include on their new compilation album. After hearing the song, Mötley Crüe bassist Nikki Sixx made several lyrical and music changes to it before the band recorded it.

== Music video ==
A video was made to promote the single, which featured each one of the band members, which includes Sixx, vocalist Vince Neil, drummer Tommy Lee and guitarist Mick Mars each individually in a nightmarish scene from their past. Sixx's scene shows him overdosing on heroin; Neil's scene shows him accidentally killing his friend, Razzle from Hanoi Rocks; Mars' scene shows him in a hospital bed, battling Ankylosing spondylitis; and Lee's scene shows him in prison. Also starred actress April Scott.

== Personnel ==
- Vince Neil - vocals
- Mick Mars - guitar
- Nikki Sixx - bass
- Tommy Lee - drums

== Charts ==
=== Weekly charts ===
Weekly chart performance for "If I Die Tomorrow"
Chart (2005)	Peak position
Scottish Singles Sales (Official Charts)	45
UK Singles (Official Charts)	63
UK Rock & Metal (Official Charts)	4
US Mainstream Rock (Billboard)	4

=== Year-end charts ===
Year-end chart performance for "If I Die Tomorrow"
Chart (2005)	Position
US Mainstream Rock Tracks (Billboard)	27

== Florida Georgia Line cover ==
In 2014, Florida Georgia Line released a cover of "If I Die Tomorrow". The song appeared on a tribute album to Mötley Crüe, Nashville Outlaws: A Tribute to Mötley Crüe (2014). Florida Georgia Line version charted on the Hot Country Songs (#33).
