= You're All I Need (song) =

Single by Mötley Crüe

from the album Girls, Girls, Girls
- B-side: "Wild Side"
- Released: 19 October 1987 (US): January 1988 (UK)
- Recorded: 1987
- Genre: Glam metal
- Length: 4:32
- Label: Elektra
- Songwriters: Nikki Sixx, Tommy Lee
- Producer: Tom Werman

Mötley Crüe singles chronology
"Wild Side" (1987)	"You're All I Need" (1987)	"Dr. Feelgood" (1989)

Music videos
- "You're All I Need" on YouTube

"You're All I Need" is a power ballad by American heavy metal band Mötley Crüe. It was released as the third and final single from the band's 1987 album Girls, Girls, Girls.

The song peaked at 83 on the Hot 100, and 23 on the UK Singles Chart. Despite the controversy and its lack of chart success, the song is considered one of their best songs.

== Song meaning ==
The song was praised by Jon Bon Jovi as "the best ballad Mötley Crüe have ever written.” When informed of this, Nikki Sixx laughed because of the gruesome meaning behind the song.

As Sixx would later relate in his Heroin Diaries memoir, "You're All I Need" was inspired by some real-life violent impulses. Convinced his girlfriend at the time (Kimberly Foster) had been cheating on him with actor Jack Wagner, who was then enjoying a taste of pop stardom with his hit single "All I Need," Sixx wrote his own song — then played it for his ex. "I took the cassette over to her apartment and I didn't say anything. I just had a little cassette player and I just played it for her, and she started crying, and I walked out the door," he later told Rolling Stone. "I was like, 'Well now, that's that.'" However, the rest of the band praised the song and it was recorded for the Girls, Girls, Girls album. In Sixx's book, The Heroin Diaries, a journal entry states that Tommy Lee was playing the song on the piano, and Sixx wrote the lyrics for the piano part.

== Music video ==
Shot in black-and-white, the video shows a man getting into a heated argument with his girlfriend, which ends with him killing her with a kitchen knife (off-screen). He then takes a picture of her off the wall, and throws it in the fireplace. After the murder, he begins having a breakdown, and destroys many objects in his house. Eventually, he is arrested by the police and is hauled away in front of many onlookers while paramedics put the dead woman in a body bag. The band appears in the video through hallucinations. The video was banned from MTV "because of its depiction of domestic violence". The video was directed by Wayne Isham. The DVD version of the video begins with a statement warning about the video's content. The video also shows a poster of Jimi Hendrix.

== Charts ==
Chart (1987)	Peak position
UK Singles (OCC)	23
US Billboard Hot 100	83
