= Saints of Los Angeles (song) =

Single by Mötley Crüe

from the album Saints of Los Angeles
- Released: April 11, 2008
- Genre: Heavy metal
- Length: 3:40
- Label: Mötley Records
- Songwriters: Nikki Sixx; DJ Ashba; James Michael; Marti Frederiksen
- Producer: James Michael

Mötley Crüe singles chronology
"Sick Love Song" (2005)	"Saints of Los Angeles" (2008)	"Mutherfucker of the Year" (2008)

Music videos
- "Saints of Los Angeles" on YouTube

"Saints of Los Angeles" is the Grammy-nominated first single from American heavy metal band Mötley Crüe's album of the same name. It was released on April 11, 2008, and started airing on radio stations on April 15 and charted at number 5 on the Hot Mainstream Rock Tracks. In the original Gang Vocal version, found on the album, the lyrics from the Lord's Prayer can be heard at the beginning of the song.

== Music video ==
A video for the single was premiered at a press conference by the band on April 15. Jacoby Shaddix (Papa Roach), Josh Todd (Buckcherry), Chris Taylor Brown (Trapt) and James Michael (Sixx:A.M.) all make cameo appearances at the end of the video. Marion Raven also appears as a dark winged angel.

== Meaning ==
According to guitarist Mick Mars, the song "is about us signing our record deal with Elektra Records and it's kinda like, the words, 'It doesn't matter what you say/I'm gonna do it anyway.' It's one of those kinds of things and it's about that; about the signing of our first record contract."

== Awards ==
The song was nominated for a Grammy Award for Best Hard Rock Performance, but lost to the Mars Volta's "Wax Simulacra". Previous nominations occurred in the same category for the songs "Dr. Feelgood" and "Kickstart My Heart", but they lost both times to Living Colour.

== Charts ==
=== Weekly charts ===
Weekly chart performance for "Saints of Los Angeles"
Chart (2008)	Peak position
Canada Hot 100 (Billboard)	46
US Bubbling Under Hot 100 (Billboard)	20
US Mainstream Rock (Billboard)	5

=== Year-end charts ===
Year-end chart performance for "Saints of Los Angeles"
Chart (2008)	Position
US Mainstream Rock Songs (Billboard)	20
