= Sick Love Song =

Single by Mötley Crüe

from the album Red, White & Crüe
- Released: 2005
- Recorded: 2004
- Genre: Alternative metal, hard rock
- Length: 4:19
- Label: Universal Records
- Songwriter(s): Sixx, Michael
- Producer(s): Bob Rock

Mötley Crüe singles chronology
"If I Die Tomorrow" (2005)	"Sick Love Song" (2005)	"Saints of Los Angeles" (2008)

"Sick Love Song" is a song by the American heavy metal band Mötley Crüe, released on their 2005 compilation album, Red, White & Crüe. Written by bassist Nikki Sixx and collaborator James Michael, "Sick Love Song" was one of the few new tracks the band recorded specifically for the album and the song charted at number 22 on the Mainstream Rock chart.

== Track listing ==
1. "Sick Love Song"
2. "Live Wire" (Leathür Records Version)
3. "Take Me To the Top" (Leathür Records Version)
4. "Sick Love Song" [Video]

== Personnel ==
- Vince Neil - vocals
- Mick Mars - guitar
- Nikki Sixx - bass
- Tommy Lee - drums

== Charts ==
Chart (2005)	Peak position
US Mainstream Rock (Billboard)	22
