= Mötley Records =

US record label founded by Mötley Crüe

- Founded: August 1998
- Founder: Mötley Crüe
- Distributor(s): Beyond Music; BMG; Hip-O Records; Universal Music Group; Better Noise Music; Warner Music Group
- Genre: Hard rock; heavy metal; glam metal
- Country of origin: United States
- Location: Los Angeles, California
- Official website: motley.com

Mötley Records is a record label founded by the American heavy metal band Mötley Crüe after severing their ties with Elektra Records and acquiring the rights to their music catalog. It serves as a successor to the band's original record label Leathür Records, which released their 1981 debut album Too Fast for Love, an imprint of Greenworld Distribution, owned by the band and original manager Allan Coffman. Leathür was soon closed when Mötley Crüe signed a deal with Elektra, which lasted until 1997. Albums produced under Mötley Records include Saints of Los Angeles, Red, White & Crüe, and New Tattoo. In addition, the label also re-released the band's first seven albums as a "Crücial Crüe" edition.

Mötley Records was originally founded in August 1998 as an imprint of Beyond Music, which in turn was distributed by BMG. Beyond Music folded in December 2002. Now the label is currently distributed by Hip-O Records and Universal Music Group, though since 2008 this has been limited to non-U.S. distribution, as the label is now distributed by Better Noise Music and Warner Music Group in North America.

Mötley Records closed when Mötley Crüe retired in 2015, but reopened in 2018 when the band announced that they reunited to record new tracks for their 2019 Netflix biopic The Dirt.

== Discography ==
=== Studio albums ===
- New Tattoo (2000)
- Saints of Los Angeles (2008)

=== Live albums ===
- Live: Entertainment or Death (1999)
- Carnival of Sins Live (2006)

=== Compilation albums ===
- Red, White & Crüe (2005)
- Greatest Hits (2009)
- The Dirt Soundtrack (2019)

=== Videos ===
- Lewd, Crüed & Tattooed (2000)
- Carnival of Sins Live (2006)
- Crüe Fest (2009)
