= Girls, Girls, Girls (Mötley Crüe album) =

Studio album by Mötley Crüe
- Released: May 20, 1987
- Recorded: March 1987 (mixing at Conway)
- Studios: One on One (Los Angeles); Conway (Hollywood); Rumbo (Los Angeles)
- Genres: Glam metal; hard rock; arena rock
- Length: 39:54
- Label: Elektra
- Producer: Tom Werman

Mötley Crüe chronology
Theatre of Pain (1985)	Girls, Girls, Girls (1987)	Raw Tracks (1988)

Singles from Girls, Girls, Girls
- 1. "Girls, Girls, Girls" Released: May 13, 1987; 2. "Wild Side" Released: August 10, 1987; 3. "You're All I Need" Released: October 19, 1987

Girls, Girls, Girls is the fourth studio album by American heavy metal band Mötley Crüe, released on May 20, 1987. The album contains the hit singles "Girls, Girls, Girls", "You're All I Need", and the MTV favorite "Wild Side". It was the band's final collaboration with producer Tom Werman, who had produced the band's two previous albums, Shout at the Devil and Theatre of Pain. Like those albums, Girls, Girls, Girls would achieve quadruple platinum status, selling over 4 million copies and reaching number two on the Billboard 200. The album marked a change to a blues-rock influenced sound, which was met with positive reception.

In 2017, Metal Hammer included the album in their list of "the 10 hair metal albums you need in your record collection".

== Reception ==
Professional ratings
Review scores
Source	Rating
AllMusic	4/5 stars
Collector's Guide to Heavy Metal	5/10
Metal Storm	9.0/10
PopMatters	unfavorable
The Rolling Stone Album Guide	3/5 stars

Girls, Girls, Girls has received mixed but generally positive reviews. In their June 12, 1987, issue The Georgia Straight applauded Mick Mars' guitar being featured more prominently in the final mix than it had been on 1985's Theatre of Pain, and called it their best work since 1981's Too Fast for Love. The publication said that the album "has recaptured some of the excitement of their first release on tunes like 'Dancing on Glass', 'Five Years Dead', and the title track, which sports a catchy guitar riff a la Aerosmith's 'Draw the Line'."

AllMusic's Steve Huey gave the album a rating of four stars and states: "Girls, Girls, Girls continued Mötley Crüe's commercial hot streak, eventually going quadruple platinum as its predecessor, Theatre of Pain, had; meanwhile, the title track brought them their second Top 20 single, and 'Wild Side' became a popular MTV item." 'Wild Side' has been described by Ultimate Classic Rock as one of the band’s most complex compositions, demonstrating complexity in both musicality and lyrics.

The album peaked at No. 2 on the Billboard charts. Eventually, the group's next album Dr. Feelgood (1989) would go on to claim the top Billboard spot. The album was also the band's third straight album to go quadruple platinum, after Shout at the Devil and Theatre of Pain.

Metal Hammer placed the album on their list of The Top 20 Best Metal Albums of 1987, and called it "an arena-rock juggernaut".

== Track listing ==
All lyrics are written by Nikki Sixx, except "Jailhouse Rock," with lyrics written by Jerry Leiber and Mike Stoller.

No.	Title	Music	Length
1.	"Wild Side"	Nikki Sixx; Tommy Lee	4:41
2.	"Girls, Girls, Girls"	Sixx; Mick Mars; Lee	4:30
3.	"Dancing on Glass"	Sixx; Mars	4:18
4.	"Bad Boy Boogie"	Sixx; Mars; Lee	3:27
5.	"Nona"	Sixx	1:27
6.	"Five Years Dead"	Sixx	3:50
7.	"All in the Name of..."	Sixx; Vince Neil	3:39
8.	"Sumthin' for Nuthin'"	Sixx; Neil	4:49
9.	"You're All I Need"	Sixx; Lee	4:32
10.	"Jailhouse Rock" (Elvis Presley cover; live)	Leiber; Stoller	4:39
Total length:			39:54

2003 Remastered Edition bonus tracks
No.	Title	Music	Length
11.	"Girls, Girls, Girls" (Tom Werman & band intro, rough mix of instrumental track)	Sixx; Mars; Lee	5:38
12.	"Wild Side" (rough mix of instrumental track)	Sixx; Lee	4:06
13.	"Rodeo" (unreleased track)	Sixx; Mars	4:14
14.	"Nona" (instrumental demo idea)	Sixx	2:42
15.	"All in the Name of..." (live in Moscow)	Sixx; Neil	5:02
16.	"Girls, Girls, Girls" (multimedia track)	Sixx; Mars; Lee

== Personnel ==
Mötley Crüe

- Vince Neil – lead vocals
- Mick Mars – guitars, backing vocals
- Nikki Sixx – bass, backing vocals
- Tommy Lee – drums, piano, backing vocals

Additional musicians

- Bob Carlisle, Dave Amato, John Purdell, Pat Torpey, Phyllis St. James, Tommy Funderburk – backing vocals

Production

- Tom Werman – producer
- Duane Baron – engineer, mixing
- Richard McKernon, Ross Hogarth, Toby Wright – assistant engineers
- Bob Ludwig – vinyl mastering at Masterdisk, New York
- Stephen Innocenzi – CD mastering

== Charts ==
Chart (1987)	Peak position
Australian Albums (Kent Music Report)	23
Canada Top Albums/CDs (RPM)	4
Finnish Albums (The Official Finnish Charts)	3
German Albums (Offizielle Top 100)	46
Norwegian Albums (VG-lista)	8
New Zealand Albums (RMNZ)	43
Swedish Albums (Sverigetopplistan)	7
Swiss Albums (Schweizer Hitparade)	13
UK Albums (Official Charts)	14
US Billboard 200	2

Chart (2022)	Peak position
Scottish Albums (Official Charts)	96
UK Independent Albums (Official Charts)	27
UK Rock & Metal Albums (Official Charts)	15

== Certifications ==
Region	Certification	Certified units/sales
Australia (ARIA)	Platinum	70,000^{^}
Canada (Music Canada)	2× Platinum	200,000^{^}
Japan (RIAJ)	Gold	100,000^{^}
United Kingdom (BPI)	Silver	60,000^{^}
United States (RIAA)	4× Platinum	4,000,000^{^}
^{^} Shipments figures based on certification alone.
