= Dr. Feelgood (album) =

Studio album by Mötley Crüe
- Released: September 1, 1989
- Recorded: 1988–1989
- Studio: Little Mountain Sound Studios (Vancouver)
- Genres: Glam metal; heavy metal; hard rock
- Length: 45:07
- Label: Elektra
- Producer: Bob Rock

Mötley Crüe chronology
Raw Tracks (1988)	Dr. Feelgood (1989)	Decade of Decadence 81–91 (1991)

Singles from Dr. Feelgood
- 1. "Dr. Feelgood" Released: August 28, 1989; 2. "Kickstart My Heart" Released: November 20, 1989; 3. "Without You" Released: February 1990; 4. "Don't Go Away Mad (Just Go Away)" Released: May 28, 1990; 5. "Same Ol' Situation (S.O.S.)" Released: July 31, 1990

Dr. Feelgood (stylized as D℞. FEELGOOD) is the fifth studio album by American heavy metal band Mötley Crüe, released on September 1, 1989. Dr. Feelgood topped the Billboard 200 chart, making it the band's only album to claim this position. It was the first album Mötley Crüe recorded after their quest for sobriety and rehabilitation in 1989. In addition to being Mötley Crüe's best selling album, it is highly regarded by music critics and fans as the band's best studio album. This was also the band's last album to be recorded with lead singer Vince Neil until the 1997 album Generation Swine.

== Recording ==
Producer Bob Rock found working with Mötley Crüe difficult, describing them as "four L.A. bad asses who used to drink a bottle of wine and want to kill each other." To minimize conflict and allow production to proceed smoothly, Rock had each member record their parts separately.

The opening track "T.n.T. (Terror 'n Tinseltown)" has a sample of a woman saying "Dr. Davis, telephone please". The same sample was used by American heavy metal band Queensrÿche in their song "Eyes of a Stranger" (1988) a year prior. The title track was inspired by a drug dealer, while the end of "Slice of Your Pie" is based on "I Want You (She's So Heavy)" (1969) by English rock band the Beatles. "Kickstart My Heart" was written by bassist Nikki Sixx after his experience being clinically dead for two minutes from a heroin overdose before paramedics revived him with two shots of adrenaline. "Without You" was co-written by drummer Tommy Lee about his relationship with his then-wife Heather Locklear.

The lyrics of "Don't Go Away Mad (Just Go Away)" reference "Too Young to Fall in Love" from the band's second studio album Shout at the Devil. Steven Tyler of Aerosmith sings backing vocals on "Sticky Sweet". "Nikki and Tommy and I hung out a lot," said Tyler, who was in Vancouver around the same time, recording Pump. "Of course, we're all akin by our old drinking and drugging days." Guitarist Mick Mars reportedly set his amps so loud that his playing leaked into Tyler's vocal recording. Bryan Adams, Skid Row, Robin Zander and Rick Nielsen of Cheap Trick, and Jack Blades of Night Ranger contributed backing vocals on the album.

== Release ==
Dr. Feelgood has sold more than nine million copies in the United States by the RIAA, and went Gold in the United Kingdom by the BPI. In various interviews, members of Mötley Crüe stated that it was their most solid album from a musical standpoint, due in no small part to their collective push for sobriety. The title track is the band's highest-charting single to date, peaking at No. 6 on the Billboard Hot 100. In addition, it is the band's only single to sell over 500,000 copies and receive Gold certification by the RIAA.

== Critical reception ==
Professional ratings
Review scores
Source	Rating
AllMusic	4.5/5 stars
Chicago Tribune	4/4 stars
Classic Rock	7/10
Collector's Guide to Heavy Metal	8.5/10
Los Angeles Times	4.5/5 stars
Metal Storm	9.0/10
Record Collector	3/5 stars
The Rolling Stone Album Guide	4/5 stars
Sputnikmusic	3.5/5

Reviews for Dr. Feelgood have been highly positive. Critics remarked the renewed energy and entertaining values that permeate the album, bringing the listeners "in a world of everlasting party", where they "savored the joys of trashy, unapologetically decadent fun". Bob Rock's meticulous production was universally praised, in particular for affording "the band the ability to write stronger melodic hooks without losing the hard rock sound they so coveted" and for the power of the guitar riffs.

Canadian journalist Martin Popoff wrote that Dr. Feelgood is an album "made by a dumb band trying really hard" while a BBC Music reviewer declared it "a glitzy flashy experience... ultimately shallow and narcissistic". Other critics stated that Mötley Crüe are not "out to win humanitarian awards or impress us with lyrical muscle", but to rock "...hard"! Dr. Feelgood, wrote Mick Wall in a review of 2009's reissue, "was the first time Mötley Crüe actually became well-known for music. Until then, their unthinking mash-up of glam and metal had made them a hoot onstage but a disappointment on record... Though pushed close by last year's shock return with the weighty Saints of Los Angeles, [the album is] the best Mötley Crüe have ever released."

"Dr. Feelgood" and "Kickstart My Heart" were nominated for Grammy awards for Best Hard Rock Performance in 1990 and 1991, but lost both years to Living Colour. Mötley Crüe won the best heavy metal/hard rock album of the year at the American Music Awards in January 1991 for Dr. Feelgood.

== Legacy ==
Metallica drummer Lars Ulrich recruited Bob Rock to produce their self-titled 1991 album after being impressed with Rock's production work on Dr. Feelgood. Rock would later produce Metallica's subsequent albums, until St. Anger, where he also played that album's bass parts.

Nike SB created a shoe based on the album cover. To celebrate the 20th anniversary of the album, Mötley Crüe performed the album in its entirety at Crüe Fest 2.

== Track listing ==
All lyrics are written by Nikki Sixx. All music is composed by Nikki Sixx and Mick Mars, except where noted.

No.	Title	Music	Length
1.	"T.n.T. (Terror 'n Tinseltown)"	Sixx	0:42
2.	"Dr. Feelgood"		4:50
3.	"Slice of Your Pie"		4:32
4.	"Rattlesnake Shake"	Sixx; Mars; Tommy Lee; Vince Neil	3:40
5.	"Kickstart My Heart"	Sixx	4:48
6.	"Without You"		4:29
7.	"Same Ol' Situation (S.O.S.)"	Sixx; Mars; Lee; Neil	4:12
8.	"Sticky Sweet"		3:52
9.	"She Goes Down"		4:37
10.	"Don't Go Away Mad (Just Go Away)"		4:40
11.	"Time for Change"	Sixx; Donna McDaniel	4:45
Total length:			45:07

2003 Remastered Edition bonus tracks
No.	Title	Music	Length
12.	"Dr. Feelgood" (demo version)		4:42
13.	"Without You" (demo version)		4:29
14.	"Kickstart My Heart" (demo version)	Sixx	4:48
15.	"Get It for Free" (unreleased track)	Sixx	4:14
16.	"Time for Change" (demo version)	Sixx; McDaniel	4:44

2009 20th Anniversary Expanded Edition bonus tracks (Released in North America)
No.	Title	Music	Length
12.	"Dr. Feelgood" (live)		5:12
13.	"Kickstart My Heart" (live)	Sixx	5:28
14.	"Without You" (live)		3:06
15.	"Same Ol' Situation (S.O.S.)" (live)	Mars; Lee; Neil	4:31
16.	"Don't Go Away Mad (Just Go Away)" (live)		4:14

2009 20th Anniversary Edition Double CD Deluxe Edition disc 2 (Released in Europe)
No.	Title	Music	Length
1.	"Dr. Feelgood" (demo version)		4:42
2.	"Without You" (demo version)		4:29
3.	"Kickstart My Heart" (demo version)	Sixx	4:48
4.	"Get it for Free" (unreleased track)	Sixx	4:14
5.	"Time for Change" (demo version)	Sixx; McDaniel	4:45
6.	"Girls, Girls, Girls" (Live Around the World 89-90)	Sixx; Mars; Lee	5:41
7.	"Red Hot" (Live Around the World 89-90)	Sixx; Mars; Neil	3:22
8.	"All in the Name of Rock" (Live Around the World 89-90)	Sixx; Neil	4:54
9.	"Dr. Feelgood" (Live Around the World 89-90)		6:41

- The original Korean LP edition does not contain the first two tracks, "T.n.T. (Terror 'n Tinseltown)" and "Dr. Feelgood".

== Dr. Feelgood: The Videos ==
Dr. Feelgood: The Videos is a video album released in 1990 and features all the music videos from the album, concert footage, interviews and recording session footage.

Videos include

1. "Dr. Feelgood"
2. "Kickstart My Heart"
3. "Without You"
4. "Don't Go Away Mad (Just Go Away)"
5. "Same Ol' Situation (S.O.S.)"

== Personnel ==
=== Mötley Crüe ===
- Vince Neil – lead vocals, backing vocals ("Dr. Feelgood", "Rattlesnake Shake", "Kickstart My Heart", "Sticky Sweet", "She Goes Down", "Time for Change"), harmonica ("Slice of Your Pie"), shakers ("Sticky Sweet")
- Mick Mars – guitars, "demonic voice" ("Dr. Feelgood")
- Nikki Sixx – bass (all except "Time for Change"), backing vocals ("Dr. Feelgood", "Rattlesnake Shake", "Sticky Sweet"), organ and piano ("Time for Change")
- Tommy Lee – drums, percussion, backing vocals ("Dr. Feelgood", "Rattlesnake Shake", "Kickstart My Heart", "Sticky Sweet", "Time for Change")

=== Additional musicians ===
- Bob Rock – bass ("Time for Change"), backing vocals ("Dr. Feelgood", "Rattlesnake Shake", "Sticky Sweet", "She Goes Down")
- John Webster – honky tonk piano ("Rattlesnake Shake")
- Tom Keenlyside, Ian Putz, Ross Gregory, Henry Christian – Margarita Horns ("Rattlesnake Shake")
- Marc LaFrance – backing vocals (all except "T.n.T. (Terror 'n Tinseltown)")
- Emi Canyn, Donna McDaniel – backing vocals ("Dr. Feelgood", "Slice of Your Pie", "Rattlesnake Shake", "Kickstart My Heart", "Same Ol' Situation (S.O.S.)", "She Goes Down", "Don't Go Away Mad (Just Go Away)", "Time for Change")
- David Steele – backing vocals ("Dr. Feelgood", "Slice of Your Pie", "Rattlesnake Shake", "Kickstart My Heart", "Sticky Sweet", "She Goes Down", "Don't Go Away Mad (Just Go Away)", "Time for Change")
- Jack Blades – backing vocals ("Same Ol' Situation (S.O.S.)", "Sticky Sweet")
- Steven Tyler, Bryan Adams – backing vocals ("Sticky Sweet")
- Robin Zander, Rick Nielsen – backing vocals ("She Goes Down")
- Skid Row, Bob Dowd, Mike Amato, Toby Francis – backing vocals ("Time for Change")

=== Production ===
- Bob Rock – production, engineering, mixing
- Randy Staub – engineering, mixing
- Chris Taylor – assistant engineering
- George Marino – mastering at Sterling Sound, New York

=== Artwork ===
- Bob Defrin – art direction
- Don Brautigam – cover art illustration
- William Hames – photography
- Kevin Brady – artwork, design
- Mike Amato – project coordinator

== Charts ==
Chart (1989–1990)	Peak position
Australian Albums (ARIA)	5
Canada Top Albums/CDs (RPM)	7
Finnish Albums (The Official Finnish Charts)	6
German Albums (Offizielle Top 100)	21
Norwegian Albums (VG-lista)	7
New Zealand Albums (RMNZ)	5
Swedish Albums (Sverigetopplistan)	6
Swiss Albums (Schweizer Hitparade)	7
UK Albums (Official Charts)	4
US Billboard 200	1

Chart (2022)	Peak position
Scottish Albums (Official Charts)	45
UK Independent Albums (Official Charts)	28
UK Rock & Metal Albums (Official Charts)	14

== Certifications ==
=== Album ===
Region	Certification	Certified units/sales
Australia (ARIA)	Platinum	70,000^{^}
Canada (Music Canada)	3× Platinum	300,000^{^}
Japan (RIAJ)	Gold	100,000^{^}
New Zealand (RMNZ)	Platinum	15,000^{^}
Switzerland (IFPI Switzerland)	Gold	25,000^{^}
United Kingdom (BPI)	Gold	100,000^{^}
United States (RIAA)	9× Platinum	9,000,000^{‡}
^{^} Shipments figures based on certification alone.^{‡} Sales+streaming figures based on certification alone.

=== Video ===
Region	Certification	Certified units/sales
United States (RIAA)	Platinum	100,000^{^}
^{^} Shipments figures based on certification alone.
