= Kickstart My Heart =

1989 single by Mötley Crüe

Single by Mötley Crüe

from the album Dr. Feelgood
- B-side: "She Goes Down"
- Released: November 20, 1989
- Genre: Glam metal
- Length: 4:48
- Label: Elektra
- Songwriter: Nikki Sixx
- Producer: Bob Rock

Mötley Crüe singles chronology
"Dr. Feelgood" (1989)	"Kickstart My Heart" (1989)	"Without You" (1990)

Music videos
- "Kickstart My Heart" on YouTube

"Kickstart My Heart" is a song by American heavy metal band Mötley Crüe, originally released on their 1989 album, Dr. Feelgood. Released as the album's second single in 1989, "Kickstart My Heart" reached number 27 on the Billboard Hot 100 chart in the United States in early 1990.

== Background ==
Mötley Crüe bassist Nikki Sixx wrote "Kickstart My Heart" on acoustic guitar during the Dr. Feelgood sessions. When the group's former manager read the lyric, he encouraged a reluctant Sixx to share it with the band and the track came together quickly.

The song's title refers an incident where a paramedic was said to have injected Sixx's heart with adrenaline to revive him after a drug overdose. Guns N' Roses drummer Steven Adler claimed the incident involved no injection, instead consisting of him dragging Sixx into a cold shower before paramedics arrived and performed cardiopulmonary resuscitation.

== Music video ==
The music video was filmed live at the Whisky a Go Go on October 5, 1989, during a warmup gig for Dr. Feelgood tour, where the band was billed as the Foreskins. Comedian Sam Kinison cameos as the limousine driver dropping the band off at the club.

== Personnel ==
Personnel per the Dr. Feelgood CD booklet.

Mötley Crüe

- Vince Neil – lead and backing vocals
- Mick Mars – guitars
- Nikki Sixx – bass
- Tommy Lee – drums, percussion, backing vocals

Additional musicians

- Mark LeFrance – backing vocals
- David Steele – backing vocals
- Emi Canyn – backing vocals
- Donna McDaniel – backing vocals

== Charts ==
Chart (1989–1990)	Peak position
Australia (ARIA)	34
Canada Top Singles (RPM)	51
New Zealand (Recorded Music NZ)	31
US Billboard Hot 100	27
US Mainstream Rock (Billboard)	18

Chart (2019)	Peak position
Canada Hot Canadian Digital Song Sales	15
Sweden Heatseeker (Sverigetopplistan)	6
UK Rock & Metal (Official Charts)	17
US Hot Rock & Alternative Songs (Billboard)	9

Chart (2026)	Peak position
Sweden Heatseeker (Sverigetopplistan)	3

== Certifications ==
Region	Certification	Certified units/sales
Denmark (IFPI Danmark)	Gold	45,000^{‡}
New Zealand (RMNZ)	2× Platinum	60,000^{‡}
Spain (Promusicae)	Gold	30,000^{‡}
United Kingdom (BPI)	Gold	400,000^{‡}
United States (RIAA)	2× Platinum	2,000,000^{‡}
^{‡} Sales+streaming figures based on certification alone.
