= Girls, Girls, Girls (Mötley Crüe song) =

Single by Mötley Crüe

from the album Girls, Girls, Girls
- B-side: "Sumthin' For Nuthin'"
- Released: May 13, 1987
- Genre: Glam metal
- Length: 4:30
- Label: Elektra
- Songwriters: Nikki Sixx, Mick Mars, Tommy Lee
- Producer: Tom Werman

Mötley Crüe singles chronology
"Home Sweet Home" (1985)	"Girls, Girls, Girls" (1987)	"Wild Side" (1987)

Music video
- "Girls, Girls, Girls" on YouTube

"Girls, Girls, Girls" is a single by American heavy metal band Mötley Crüe. It is the first single from the album of the same name, and was released on May 13, 1987.

The song pays tribute to strippers, referencing iconic stripper clubs in Los Angeles' Sunset Strip, Vancouver, Fort Lauderdale, Atlanta and Paris.

== Production ==
The track was thoroughly pre-produced, and was then recorded at different studios over the course of several weeks, starting with the drum parts, then bass and guitar, and finally vocals.

== Meaning ==
The song references several strip clubs, including The Tropicana, The Body Shop, Seventh Veil (all located on the Sunset Strip in Los Angeles, California), the Marble Arch (Vancouver, BC, Canada), The Dollhouse (Fort Lauderdale, Florida), the famous Crazy Horse in Paris, France, and Tattletales in Atlanta, Georgia.

== Music video ==
Filmed on the night of April 13, 1987, Mötley Crüe shot their video for "Girls, Girls, Girls" with director Wayne Isham. With a strip club theme planned for the video, they originally wanted to use The Body Shop, but since that venue is all-nude and does not serve alcohol, they ended up shooting it at The Seventh Veil. By the time they finished at the club, none of the band members were functioning properly. They left the club on their motorcycles to go to Isham's studio nearby to film inserts, stopping off at a Mexican restaurant for shooters and taquitos on the way.

The original cut of the video featured topless dancers and was purposely sent by Isham to MTV before it was rejected and replaced with a more sanitized version.

== Personnel ==
Personnel taken from Mixonline.

Mötley Crüe

- Vince Neil – lead vocals
- Mick Mars – guitars
- Nikki Sixx – bass
- Tommy Lee – drums

Additional musician

- John Purdell – backing vocals

== Charts ==
Chart (1987)	Peak position
Australia (ARIA)	43
Canada Top Singles (RPM)	20
UK Singles (OCC)	26
US Billboard Hot 100	12
US Album Rock Tracks (Billboard)	20

Chart (2019)	Peak position
Canada Hot Canadian Digital Song Sales	43
UK Rock & Metal	33
US Hot Rock & Alternative Songs	19
US Rock Digital Song Sales	12

== Certifications ==
Region	Certification	Certified units/sales
New Zealand (RMNZ)	Gold	15,000^{‡}
United Kingdom (BPI)	Silver	200,000^{‡}
United States (RIAA)	Platinum	1,000,000^{‡}
^{‡} Sales+streaming figures based on certification alone.

== Legacy ==
In 2010, "Girls, Girls, Girls" was made available as a download for Guitar Hero 5 as part of the "80's Track Pack".

Lady Gaga's song "Boys Boys Boys" from her 2008 debut album The Fame was partially inspired by "Girls, Girls, Girls".
