= Dr. Feelgood (Mötley Crüe song) =

1989 single by Mötley Crüe

Single by Mötley Crüe

from the album Dr. Feelgood
- B-side: "Sticky Sweet"
- Released: August 28, 1989
- Recorded: 1989
- Studio: Little Mountain Sound Studios, Vancouver, BC, Canada
- Genre: Glam metal; hard rock
- Length: 4:50
- Label: Elektra
- Songwriters: Nikki Sixx; Mick Mars
- Producer: Bob Rock

Mötley Crüe singles chronology
"You're All I Need" (1987)	"Dr. Feelgood" (1989)	"Kickstart My Heart" (1989)

Audio sample
- "Dr. Feelgood": file; help

Music videos
- "Dr. Feelgood" on YouTube

"Dr. Feelgood" is a song by American heavy metal band Mötley Crüe. It was released as the lead single from their fifth studio album of the same name.

"Dr. Feelgood" is Mötley Crüe's only gold single in the U.S. In 2009, it was ranked the 15th greatest hard rock song of all time by VH1.

== Theme and musical style ==
The tune explores the intersection of the LA Sunset Strip scene and drugs, depicting a drug dealer. This track marks a departure from the band's earlier musical style, introducing a funk rock groove and more sophisticated lyrics that deviate from their previous straightforward riffing and simpler lyrical approach.

== Critical reception ==
Upon release, David Giles of British magazine Music Week left a mixed review of the single. He called the song "almost funky furore, at the point where metal meets boogie" but "where the sound should be huge and fulsome, it is disappointingly trebly." Juke called it, "face-sucking, crotch-throbbing metal lust pop played by the best bad boys in the biz."

== Commercial performance ==
Released in 1989 as the album's first single, "Dr. Feelgood" became Mötley Crüe's first American Top Ten hit, peaking at No. 6 on the Billboard Hot 100 on October 28, 1989. It is their highest ranked single to this day. In November 1989, the single was certified Gold by the RIAA for more than 500,000 units shipped in the United States.

== Personnel ==
Mötley Crüe

- Vince Neil – lead and backing vocals
- Mick Mars – guitar, "demonic voice"
- Nikki Sixx – bass guitar, backing vocals
- Tommy Lee – drums, percussion, backing vocals

Additional musicians

- Mark LeFrance – backing vocals
- David Steele – backing vocals
- Emi Canyn – backing vocals
- Donna McDaniel – backing vocals
- Bob Rock – backing vocals

== Charts ==
Chart (1989)	Peak position
Australia (ARIA)	26
New Zealand (Recorded Music NZ)	11
UK Singles (Official Charts)	50
US Billboard Hot 100	6
US Mainstream Rock (Billboard)	7
US Hot Rock & Alternative Songs (Billboard)	20

== Certifications ==
Region	Certification	Certified units/sales
New Zealand (RMNZ)	Gold	15,000^{‡}
United States (RIAA)	Platinum	1,000,000^{‡}
^{‡} Sales+streaming figures based on certification alone.
