= Mick Mars =

American musician (born 1951)

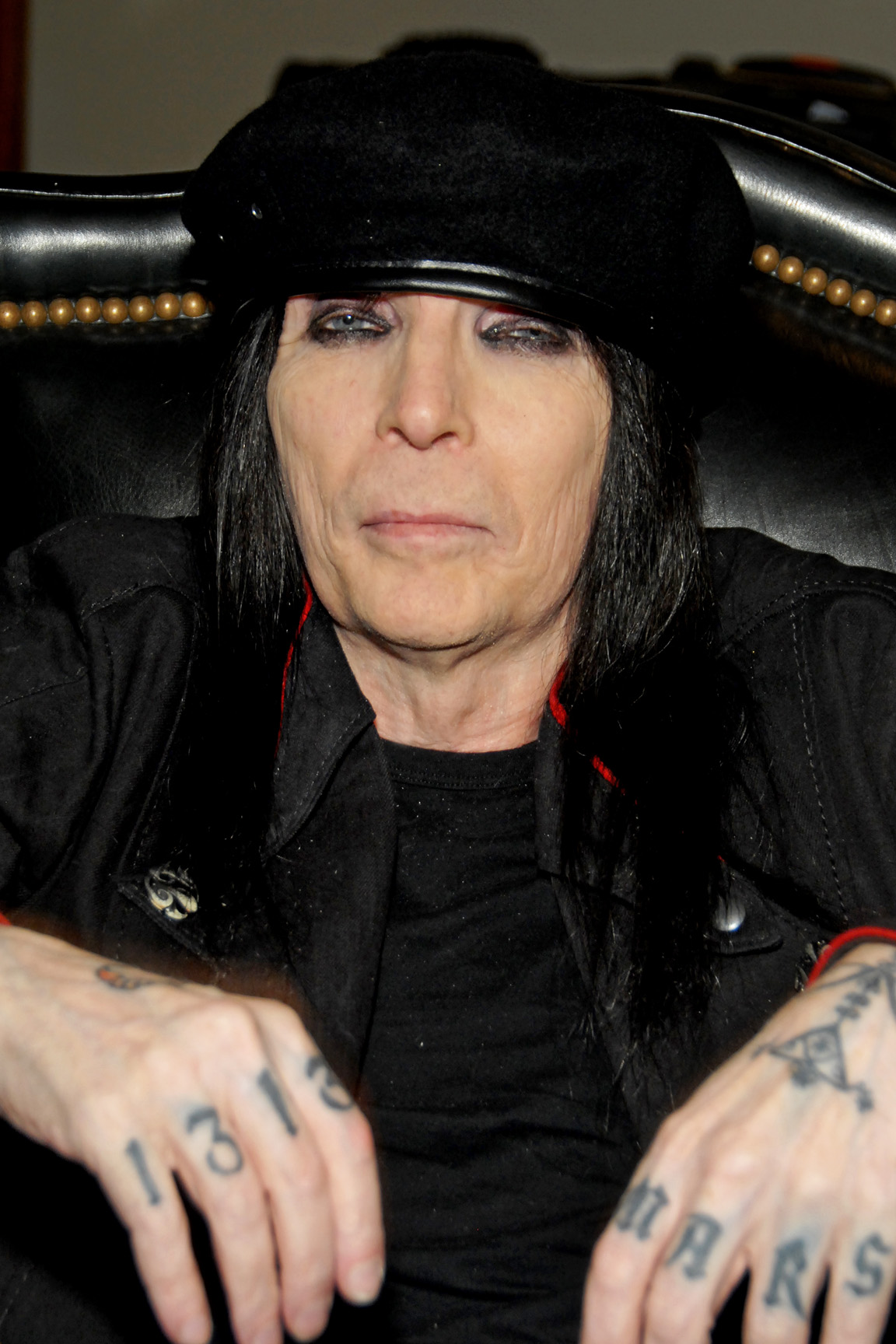
- Mick Mars in 2012

Background information
- Born: Robert Alan Deal; May 4, 1951 (age 75); Terre Haute, Indiana, U.S.
- Genres: Heavy metal; hard rock; glam metal; blues rock
- Occupations: Musician; songwriter
- Instrument: Guitar
- Years active: 1965–present
- Formerly of: Mötley Crüe

Robert Alan Deal (born May 4, 1951), known professionally as Mick Mars, is an American musician. He is best known as a former member of the heavy metal band Mötley Crüe, which he co-founded in 1981 as the lead guitarist and played with until 2023. He is known for his aggressive, melodic solos and bluesy riffs.

== Early life ==
Mars was born Robert Alan Deal, in Terre Haute, Indiana, in 1951. Soon after, his family moved to Huntington, Indiana. Before he was nine years old, his family relocated again, this time to Garden Grove, California. He realized he wanted to become a musician at only three years of age, when his parents took him to see country singer Skeeter Bonn at a local 4-H Fair in Indiana. "He was wearing a bright-orange outfit with rhinestones all over the place, and a big white Stetson hat. I went, 'I'm doing that. That's what I want to do.'" He attended Westminster High School.

== Career ==
=== Early career ===
His parents bought him his first guitar at age 12 and he began a relentless practice routine, thinking only of becoming a successful musician. He began at age 14 as bassist in a Beatles cover group called The Jades before switching to lead guitar. He dropped out of high school and began playing guitar in a series of unsuccessful blues-based rock bands throughout the 1970s.

In his early 20s, he took a job in an industrial laundromat operating heavy machinery while moonlighting with his band Wahtoshi in the local club circuit. After recovering from a serious injury to one of his hands suffered in a workplace accident, he quit to focus on music full time. In 1973, he joined a cover band called White Horse and soon began to be recognized as an accomplished guitarist. "He could copy parts note for note. You give him "Highway Star" and he could nail Ritchie Blackmore's riffs," said ex-White Horse bassist Harry Clay.

Former White Horse drummer Jack Valentine says that Mars began using various aliases in the 1970s such as Zorky Charlemagne as a means of avoiding the police, as he was behind on child-support payments to ex-girlfriend Sharon, the mother of two of his children. "Any time we got pulled over by the cops for a taillight or whatever, and the cops saw his ID, they'd throw him in jail. We'd have to figure a way to get him out," recalled Valentine.

White Horse had a promising future, and Mars (still known as Bob Deal) began drawing comparisons to another young guitarist named Eddie Van Halen of a rival club band named Mammoth. "Mick Mars and Eddie Van Halen were the two hottest guitar players in LA. There probably weren't two better guitar players on the planet," said Valentine. Mars eventually left White Horse when the band decided to play disco music in the hopes of achieving greater success.

He then joined a pop group called Video Nu-R and released the singles "Gypsy Woman/You Drive Me Crazy" in 1978 and "Work, Work/Decadence Plus" in 1979. These singles marked Mars' recording debut.

=== Mötley Crüe ===
After nearly a decade of frustration on the California club circuit, he made the decision to reinvent himself. He shaved off his trademark mustache, adopted the stage name Mick Mars, and dyed his hair jet black, hoping for a fresh start. In April 1980 he placed an ad in the LA newspaper The Recycler, describing himself as "a loud, rude and aggressive guitar player" in need of a band. Nikki Sixx and Tommy Lee, who were putting together a new band that would soon become Mötley Crüe, contacted him and hired him after hearing him play. Lee opened the door and recalled "he's standing there looking like Cousin Itt from The Addams Family" and immediately turned to Sixx and said "This is our guy, he's perfect, he's disgusting and scary".

The name Mötley Crüe came about at the suggestion of Mars. In the early days of White Horse, someone had referred to the band as a "motley looking crew" and Motley Crew was a name they had initially considered using. Sixx liked the name and subsequently altered it to Mötley Crüe.

One of the most influential heavy metal groups of the 1980s, Mötley Crüe has sold over 100 million albums worldwide. They have also achieved seven multiplatinum and five platinum US certifications, nine Top 10 albums on the Billboard 200 chart, twenty-two Top 40 mainstream rock hits, and six Top 20 pop singles.

While Mötley Crüe gained a well-deserved reputation for partying, Mars was never a fan of drugs. "I went, 'Please don't ever, ever do smack. You can't make music when you're falling down'," he told his bandmates when heroin began to enter the picture. He did, however, develop a serious drinking problem after joining the band.

During the recording of their Dr. Feelgood album in 1989 Mars reportedly used so many amplifiers on his guitar that sounds of his guitar could be heard on the recordings of Aerosmith's album Pump, which was being recorded in the same studio at the time:

Steven Tyler was doing vocals with producer Bruce Fairbairn next door, and I remember them yelling at me, 'You've gotta turn your stuff down, Mick! It's leaking into our vocals.' I didn't turn down, though. I just told them, 'Hey, that's the way I play – loud, so yeah, I'm all over the record they were doing. Somewhere in the mix, you'll hear me.

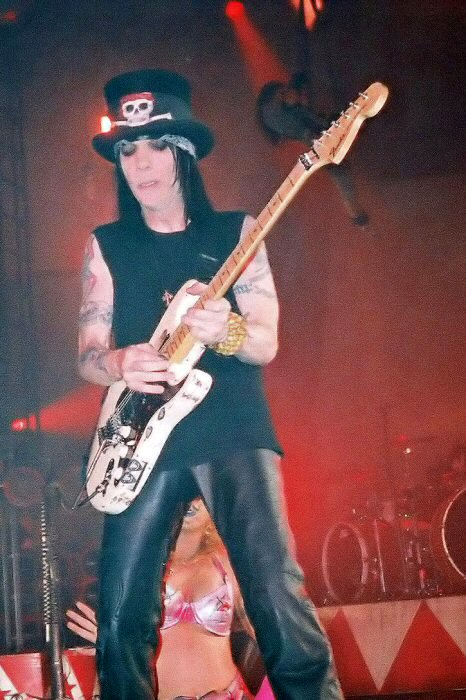
Mars performing in 2005

When the band made the decision to fire vocalist John Corabi and reunite with original vocalist Vince Neil in 1997 for Generation Swine, Mars was not involved in the decision-making process. "They had no respect for Mick," Corabi said. "Mick was just the grumpy old bastard to them. [Sixx and Lee] gave Mick shit about his finances and the girls he dated. He'd been dealing with over 20 years of this." Mars refers to the Generation Swine era as his only regret as a member of Mötley Crüe, as the band erased much of what he recorded in the studio and hired session guitarists instead. Mars also claims that he had little involvement in 2000's New Tattoo, saying "I didn't write any of those songs, since I wasn't invited. I think I got one lick on that album." Sixx has denied this claim, saying that "This is during the period that [Mars] had disintegrated into opiate addiction."

On 2008's Saints of Los Angeles, guitarist DJ Ashba recorded the vast majority of the guitar parts, though his work was uncredited. Sixx has said that the band had no choice, claiming that "Mick was struggling to play his parts."

Mötley Crüe reunited in 2018 and started touring again in 2022. However, several years away from the band had convinced Mars that he never wanted to tour again. He made it clear to his bandmates that he was open to recording again but could not handle another world tour, as he could no longer move his head from side to side and was permanently hunched over.

Mars says he has never had a close offstage relationship with any of his Mötley Crüe bandmates. "(Sixx) has only ever visited me two or three times at the most," he says. "Tommy came over once, and Vince just came over once, even though he lived just around the corner from me in Venice Beach. It's just the way we worked," he says.

=== Retirement and lawsuit against Mötley Crue ===
On October 26, 2022, Mars announced his retirement from touring with Mötley Crüe. The next day, the band confirmed that John 5 had taken his place. That same week, they announced Mars' complete retirement from the band, supporting his decision, with John 5 taking his place starting with the 2023's The World Tour with Def Leppard.

On April 6, 2023, Mars sued the band, alleging that the group were trying to "unilaterally" get Mars removed from the lineup. Later that day, the band released a statement stating that, whilst Mars hadn't been fired, he isn't touring with the group. Mars would state:

Those guys have been hammering on me since '87, trying to replace me, they haven't been able to do that, because I'm the guitar player. I helped form this band. It's my name I came up with, my ideas, my money that I had from a backer to start this band. It wouldn't have gone anywhere.

Mars refused to sign a severance agreement that would divest him of those and other future interests, in return for a five percent stake in the group's 2023 tour, which is going on without him.

In January 2026, Mötley Crüe won their legal battle against Mars, with Mars admitting under oath his claims that the band fired him, that they tried to reduce his stake from 25% to 5% in Mötley Crüe Inc., and the accusations of the band performing to backing tracks were all false. He was also forced to pay back $750,000 in touring advances, and was dismissed as a manager, agent and co-owner of Mötley Crüe Inc.

=== Solo career ===
In February 2023, amidst the controversies surrounding the band lawsuit, Mars began work on a solo album again, titled The Other Side of Mars, produced in Los Angeles. Cory Marks has described the album, saying:

The rock world is in for something weird, special, great and loud.

Mars stated that plans surrounding a solo album had previously been discussed since 2014. The Other Side of Mars was released on February 23, 2024.

The first single from the album, "Loyal to the Lie", was released on October 31, 2023.

=== Other works ===
Mars has contributed songwriting to John LeCompt, a former member of Evanescence and the other band members of Machina, and to the Swedish band Crashdïet. Their second album, The Unattractive Revolution, was released on October 3, 2007, and featured two songs co-written by Mars.

Mars played guitar on the title track of Hinder's 2008 album Take It to the Limit, and contributed a guitar solo to the song "Into the Light" by Papa Roach, on their 2009 album Metamorphosis. Mars also contributed a guitar solo to the song "The Question" on Rock Star: Supernova runner-up Dilana's U.S. debut album Inside Out. In 2010 he co-wrote a song with Escape the Fate for the band's self-titled album, which was instead withheld from the album and reserved for a later release. Mars co-wrote and appears in the music video of the song "Boss's Daughter" by Pop Evil on their 2011 album War of Angels.

In November 2019, Mars released a new song, "The Way I'm Wired", with Black Smoke Trigger. Mars was also featured on the hit single "Outlaws & Outsiders" by Cory Marks. In 2024, Mars was featured on another Cory Marks single titled "(Make My) Country Rock".

== Personal life ==
=== Family ===
With his girlfriend and later wife Sharon, Mars has a son and a daughter, both born in the 1970s. Sharon would later walk out on him with the children after a workplace accident left him unable to provide for the family or play guitar. He fathered a third child with a woman named Marcia Lea Martell (née Tucker), while playing in the band White Horse. At one point, with three children and little success as a musician, Mars' well-being suffered. "He was a real sad guy," said ex-White Horse drummer Jack Valentine. "Looking into his eyes, I just saw this world of sorrow. He had such a hard life." Later he was married to Emi Canyn from 1990 to 1994. His current wife since 2013 is former model Seraina Schönenberger. Mars says he's been financially destitute three times in his life. "One was before (Mötley Crüe) formed. Two was the first wife, and three was the second wife. They drained my bank accounts. I lost my house. I lost cars. I lost guitars. I lost everything," he remembers.

In 1989 Martell filed a "Complaint For Breach of Oral Agreement, Injunctive Relief, and Negligent and Intentional Infliction of Emotional Distress" against Mars, claiming that he intentionally and maliciously neglected their son's emotional needs due to his refusal to meet or communicate with the boy despite their son's desires.

Mars has nine grandchildren and at least one great-grandchild, though he doesn't know the exact number.

Mars currently resides in Nashville, Tennessee, with Schönenberger. He has a relationship with his son, but is estranged from his other children.

=== Health ===
For all of his professional career, Mars has struggled with ankylosing spondylitis, a chronic, inflammatory form of arthritis that mainly affects the spine and pelvis. He says the pain began when he was 14 years old, with sharp pain at the top of his tailbone. He did not get a proper diagnosis until he was 27, and the condition has caused him a great deal of pain and increasingly impaired his movement throughout his life. He has said that although the condition can be quite painful, he is grateful that ankylosing spondylitis rarely affects the hands and feet; "That meant I could play guitar, and that's what mattered most." Mars said in Mötley Crüe's 2001 autobiography, The Dirt:

My hips started hurting so bad every time I turned my body that it felt like someone was igniting fireworks in my bones. I didn't have enough money to see a doctor, so I just kept hoping that I could do what I usually do: will it away, through the power of my mind. But it kept getting worse.

By late 2001, the excruciating pain caused by ankylosing spondylitis led to addiction issues with Oxycontin, Vicodin, and Lortab. He was also drinking heavily and taking as many as 45 Advil a day. Mars rarely left his home or even went outside during this period. "I used to see giant reptile aliens at the end of my bed," he says. Sixx claims that Mars eventually moved into his house and that he "actually had to spoon-feed [Mars] since he was so fucked up."

Over the years, the illness has caused his lower spine to seize up and freeze completely solid, "... causing scoliosis in [his] back and squashing [him] further down and forward until [he] was a full three inches (7.6 cm) shorter than [he] was in high school." Mars reported in 2013 that his neck is so stiff he could not even turn his head, preventing him from driving a car. The condition led to hip-replacement surgery at the end of 2004. Despite the pain, Mars refuses to use a cane or a wheelchair, saying "If I can't get up there myself, I'm not doing it."

== Influences ==
Mainly influenced by the blues rock music of the 1960s, he has pointed out the likes of Eric Clapton and Jimi Hendrix as influences:

When I started out on the guitar, I was influenced by people like Michael Bloomfield, Jeff Beck, Eric Clapton and Jimi Hendrix. Those guys sort of taught me how to play "real" guitar. But again, with riffs, you have to look into your soul and see what comes out.

Mars also claims that the albums: Axis: Bold as Love (1967), Truth (1968), Having a Rave Up with the Yardbirds (1965), Disraeli Gears (1967), Layla and Other Assorted Love Songs (1970), Bad Company (1974), Band of Gypsys (1970), Led Zeppelin II (1969), and various songs by Mike Bloomfield helped "change his life". Former Mötley Crüe vocalist John Corabi has said that Mars was a big fan of Leslie West and Jeff Beck; "To Mick, it was about kicking you in the chest and having this ungodly sound."

== Equipment ==
Mars in his early career used guitars that were popular at the time: Kramer, and other Superstrats; on occasion he used a black Gibson Les Paul Custom, and sometimes a B.C. Rich. However, according to an interview published in September 2009, Mars' main stage guitars for that tour were Fender Stratocasters with an "HSH" (humbucker, single coil, humbucker) configuration. He frequently used a Stratocaster modified from components of 1963, 1964, and 1965 models with J.M. Rolph pickups and a licensed Floyd Rose bridge system turning it into a Superstrat.

== Discography ==
=== Solo ===
- The Other Side of Mars (2024)

=== With Mötley Crüe ===
- Too Fast for Love (1981)
- Shout at the Devil (1983)
- Theatre of Pain (1985)
- Girls, Girls, Girls (1987)
- Dr. Feelgood (1989)
- Mötley Crüe (1994)
- Generation Swine (1997)
- New Tattoo (2000)
- Saints of Los Angeles (2008)

=== With Hear 'n Aid ===
- Hear 'n Aid (1986)
