= Music to Crash Your Car To: Vol. 1 =

Box set by Mötley Crüe
- Released: November 11, 2003
- Recorded: 1981–1987
- Genre: Heavy metal; glam metal
- Length: 4:22:51
- Label: Mötley; Hip-O

Mötley Crüe chronology
New Tattoo (2000)	Music to Crash Your Car To: Vol. 1 (2003)	Music to Crash Your Car To: Vol. 2 (2004)

Professional ratings
Review scores
Source	Rating
AllMusic	4.5/5 stars
PopMatters	(mixed)
The Rolling Stone Album Guide	2/5 stars

Music to Crash Your Car To: Vol. 1 is the first box set by the American glam metal band Mötley Crüe. Released on November 11, 2003, it contains the band's first four albums in their reissued format (i.e. including the bonus tracks): Too Fast for Love, Shout at the Devil, Theatre of Pain and Girls, Girls, Girls. As an added bonus, the box set features the original mix of Too Fast for Love as released on Leathür Records, as well as an illustrated inlay. Music to Crash Your Car To: Vol. 2 was also released in 2004, containing songs from the group's later years.

The album's title is taken from the lyrics of the song "Crash" by Tommy Lee's band Methods of Mayhem, but music critics such as Adrien Begrand of PopMatters found it to be in poor taste, considering the legal troubles of Vince Neil with regard to his 1984 drunk driving and vehicular manslaughter charge.

== Track listing ==
All tracks are written by Nikki Sixx, except where noted.

Disc 1: Too Fast for Love
No.	Title	Writer(s)	Length
1.	"Live Wire" (Leathür Original Mix)		3:16
2.	"Public Enemy #1" (Leathür Original Mix)	Sixx; Lizzie Grey	4:24
3.	"Take Me to the Top" (Leathür Original Mix)		3:45
4.	"Merry-Go-Round" (Leathür Original Mix)		3:22
5.	"Piece of Your Action" (Leathür Original Mix)	Sixx; Vince Neil	4:42
6.	"Starry Eyes" (Leathür Original Mix)		4:32
7.	"Stick to Your Guns" (Leathür Original Mix)	Sixx; Mick Mars	4:20
8.	"Come On and Dance" (Leathür Original Mix)		3:14
9.	"Too Fast for Love" (Leathür Original Mix)		4:17
10.	"On with the Show" (Leathür Original Mix)		4:04
11.	"Live Wire"		3:14
12.	"Come On and Dance"		2:46
13.	"Public Enemy #1"	Sixx; Grey	4:22
14.	"Merry-Go-Round"		3:21
15.	"Take Me to the Top"		3:44
16.	"Piece of Your Action"	Sixx; Neil	4:39
17.	"Starry Eyes"		4:28
18.	"Too Fast for Love"		3:21
19.	"On with the Show"		4:03

Disc 2: Too Fast for Love / Shout at the Devil
No.	Title	Writer(s)	Length
1.	"Toast of the Town"	Sixx; Mars	3:34
2.	"Tonight" (Raspberries cover)	Eric Carmen	4:26
3.	"Too Fast for Love" (Alternate Intro)		4:19
4.	"Merry-Go-Round" (Live)		3:56
5.	"In the Beginning"	Sixx; Geoff Workman	1:14
6.	"Shout at the Devil"		3:16
7.	"Looks That Kill"		4:08
8.	"Bastard"		2:54
9.	"God Bless the Children of the Beast"	Mars	1:31
10.	"Helter Skelter" (The Beatles cover)	Lennon–McCartney	3:13
11.	"Red Hot"	Sixx; Mars; Neil	3:21
12.	"Too Young to Fall in Love"		3:33
13.	"Knock 'Em Dead, Kid"	Sixx; Mars	3:43
14.	"Ten Seconds to Love"	Sixx; Neil	4:17
15.	"Danger"	Sixx; Mars; Neil	3:46
16.	"Shout at the Devil" (Demo)		3:17
17.	"Looks That Kill" (Demo)		5:05
18.	"Hotter Than Hell" (Demo)		2:51
19.	"I Will Survive"	Sixx; Mars	3:22
20.	"Too Young to Fall in Love" (Demo)		3:03

Disc 3: Theatre of Pain
No.	Title	Writer(s)	Length
1.	"City Boy Blues"	Sixx; Mars; Neil	4:09
2.	"Smokin' in the Boys Room" (Brownsville Station cover)		3:27
3.	"Louder Than Hell"		2:32
4.	"Keep Your Eye on the Money"		4:39
5.	"Home Sweet Home"	Sixx; Neil; Tommy Lee	4:00
6.	"Tonight (We Need a Lover)"	Sixx; Neil	3:37
7.	"Use It or Lose It"	Sixx; Mars; Neil; Lee	2:38
8.	"Save Our Souls"	Sixx; Neil	4:13
9.	"Raise Your Hands to Rock"		2:49
10.	"Fight for Your Rights"	Sixx; Mars	3:49
11.	"Home Sweet Home" (Demo)	Sixx; Neil; Lee	4:24
12.	"Smokin' in the Boys Room" (Alternate Guitar Solo - Rough Mix)	Koda; Lutz	3:33
13.	"City Boy Blues" (Demo)	Sixx; Mars; Neil	4:28
14.	"Home Sweet Home" (Instrumental Rough Mix)	Sixx; Neil; Lee	2:57
15.	"Keep Your Eye on the Money" (Demo)		3:49
16.	"Tommy's Drum Piece from Cherokee Studios"	Lee	3:13

Disc 4: Girls, Girls, Girls
No.	Title	Writer(s)	Length
1.	"Wild Side"	Sixx; Lee	4:43
2.	"Girls, Girls, Girls"	Sixx; Mars; Lee	4:31
3.	"Dancing on Glass"	Sixx; Mars	4:20
4.	"Bad Boy Boogie"	Sixx; Mars; Lee	3:28
5.	"Nona"		1:26
6.	"Five Years Dead"		3:51
7.	"All in the Name of..."	Sixx; Neil	3:41
8.	"Sumthin' for Nuthin'"	Sixx; Neil	4:49
9.	"You're All I Need"	Sixx; Lee	4:35
10.	"Jailhouse Rock (live)" (Elvis Presley cover)		4:39
11.	"Girls, Girls, Girls" (Tom Werman and Band Intro - Rough Mix Instrumental Track)	Sixx; Mars; Lee	5:38
12.	"Wild Side" (Instrumental Rough Mix)	Sixx; Lee	4:09
13.	"Rodeo"	Sixx; Mars	4:12
14.	"Nona" (Instrumental Demo Idea)		2:44
15.	"All in the Name of..." (Live)	Sixx; Neil	5:01

== Personnel ==
- Vince Neil – lead vocals, harmonica
- Mick Mars – guitars, backing vocals
- Nikki Sixx – bass, synthesizers, backing vocals
- Tommy Lee – drums, piano, backing vocals
