= Loud as Fuck =

Loud as F@*k

Compilation album by Mötley Crüe
- Released: April 13, 2004
- Recorded: 1981–2000
- Genre: Heavy metal
- Length: 79:11 (disc 1); 75:46 (disc 2)
- Label: Mötley Records

Mötley Crüe chronology
Music to Crash Your Car To: Vol. 2 (2004)	Loud as F@*k (2004)	Red, White & Crüe (2005)

Professional ratings
Review scores
Source	Rating
AllMusic	link
The Rolling Stone Album Guide	link

Loud as Fuck (censored as Loud as F@*k) is the seventh compilation album by the heavy metal band Mötley Crüe. It was released in 2004 in Europe on Mötley Records.

== Overview ==
The record includes 40 of the group's greatest tracks remastered with 10 promo videos. It was developed with the help of former Kerrang! Editor Dante Bonutto and Mötley Crüe bassist Nikki Sixx.

== Track listing ==
=== Disc 1 ===
1. "Wild Side" – 4:40
2. "Too Fast for Love" – 4:11
3. "Shout at the Devil" – 3:16
4. "A Rat Like Me" – 4:13
5. "Primal Scream" – 4:46
6. "Let Us Prey" – 4:22
7. "Dancing on Glass" – 4:18
8. "Bitter Pill" – 4:27
9. "Dr. Feelgood" – 4:50
10. "You're All I Need" – 4:43
11. "Piece of Your Action" – 4:40
12. "Red Hot" – 3:21
13. "Find Myself" – 2:51
14. "Hell On High Heels" – 4:15
15. "Tonight (We Need a Lover)" – 3:37
16. "Poison Apples" – 3:40
17. "Don't Go Away Mad (Just Go Away)" – 4:40
18. "Starry Eyes" – 4:30
19. "Danger" – 3:51

=== Disc 2 ===
1. "Kickstart My Heart" – 4:48
2. "Looks That Kill" – 4:07
3. "Louder Than Hell" – 2:32
4. "Take Me to the Top" – 3:46
5. "Girls, Girls, Girls" – 4:30
6. "Afraid" – 4:07
7. "Hooligan's Holiday" – 5:51
8. "Knock 'Em Dead, Kid" – 3:40
9. "Slice of Your Pie" – 4:32
10. "Merry-Go-Round" – 3:27
11. "All in the Name Of..." – 3:39
12. "Too Young to Fall in Love" – 3:34
13. "Glitter" – 5:00
14. "Smokin' in the Boys Room" – 3:27
15. "Punched in the Teeth by Love" – 3:32
16. "Beauty" – 3:47
17. "Live Wire" – 3:16
18. "Same Ol' Situation (S.O.S.)" – 4:12
19. "Home Sweet Home" – 3:59

=== Disc 3 ===
1. "Live Wire" (DVD)
2. "Looks That Kill" (DVD)
3. "Home Sweet Home" (DVD)
4. "Wild Side" (DVD)
5. "Girls, Girls, Girls" (DVD)
6. "Dr. Feelgood" (DVD)
7. "Same Ol' Situation (S.O.S.)" (DVD)
8. "Primal Scream" (DVD)
9. "Holigan's Holiday (DVD)
10. "Hell On High Heels" (DVD)
