= Theatre of Pain =

Studio album by Mötley Crüe
- Released: June 21, 1985
- Studios: Pasha (Hollywood); Cherokee (Hollywood); Record Plant West (Hollywood)
- Genre: Glam metal
- Length: 35:16
- Label: Elektra
- Producer: Tom Werman

Mötley Crüe chronology
Shout at the Devil (1983)	Theatre of Pain (1985)	Girls, Girls, Girls (1987)

Singles from Theatre of Pain
- 1. "Smokin' in the Boys Room" Released: June 24, 1985; 2. "Home Sweet Home" Released: September 30, 1985; 3. "Keep Your Eye on the Money" Released: 1986 (Spain)

Theatre of Pain is the third studio album by American heavy metal band Mötley Crüe, released on June 21, 1985. Released in the aftermath of lead vocalist Vince Neil's arrest for manslaughter on a drunk driving charge, the album marked the beginning of the band's transition away from the traditional heavy metal sound of Too Fast for Love and Shout at the Devil, towards a more glam metal style. It received negative or indifferent critical response, and is poorly regarded by some of the band members.

Theatre of Pain contains the hit singles "Smokin' in the Boys Room" (a cover of the 1973 Brownsville Station hit) and the power ballad "Home Sweet Home". It was supported by the Theatre of Pain world tour from July 7, 1985 to March 3, 1986. The album reached No. 6 on the US charts and No. 36 in the UK, and was certified quadruple platinum by the RIAA on June 5, 1995.

== Background ==
The band had enjoyed a tumultuous two years in the wake of Shout at the Devil's unexpected success. The band's fondness for partying and sex earned them a reputation as a legitimately dangerous band, culminating in a December 8, 1984, car crash which killed Hanoi Rocks' drummer Nicholas "Razzle" Dingley and saw Mötley Crüe's lead vocalist Vince Neil facing possible prison time for vehicular manslaughter. On top of Neil's troubles, the band's founder and primary songwriter, Nikki Sixx, had developed a heroin addiction which was beginning to spiral out of control. Further adding to the turmoil, the band had been seriously considering replacing guitarist Mick Mars. It was with these uncertainties hanging over the band that Theatre of Pain's recording commenced in January, 1985. During recording, the album's working title was Entertainment or Death, though Sixx changed it prior to release. The title "Theatre of Pain" comes from a line in the band's then-unreleased song "Black Widow" and was announced in December 1982 as the title for the band's previous album, which ended up being called "Shout at the Devil".

== Production ==
Mötley Crüe started recording their third album, Theatre of Pain, in early 1985, with Tom Werman again hired to produce. The album was dedicated to the memory of Nicholas "Razzle" Dingley.

Though Sixx, the band's primary songwriter, was battling a heroin habit during the album's recording, he has since blamed producer Werman for the album's shortcomings, saying in his 2007 memoir The Heroin Diaries that Werman "didn’t really know how to control us, or to do what it is we needed to make the follow-up to Shout at the Devil." Werman responded to Sixx's criticism, saying in 2008:

Isn't it curious how they say they love you while they're selling millions of records, but a couple of decades later you didn't capture their sound, you didn't work hard enough, you didn't pay enough attention, you talked on the phone all the time, you partied too hard, and, in fact, you're personally responsible for everything in their lives that they've failed to achieve?

Guitarist Greg Leon, the band's original lead guitarist before Mick Mars entered the picture, claims Sixx did not actually perform on Theatre of Pain. Leon says he was present during the Theatre of Pain sessions and was shocked to find that Werman had hired a session musician to play bass. "I won't mention the guy's name who actually played bass, but it wasn't Nikki. I remember asking the guy, 'Hey, what are you doing here?', and he was like, 'Oh, I'm playing bass on the Mötley Crüe record.'" Leon said that producer Werman made the decision because "Nikki wasn't up to snuff" during recording.

While not the first power ballad for the band, in the form of "Home Sweet Home" was still a monumental moment for the band as it was backed by a road-diary-style music video directed by Wayne Isham (who would go on to do "Wanted Dead or Alive" by Bon Jovi). Some observers were unhappy with the band's decision to record a ballad and release it as a single. Said Sixx at the time, "First we were mass murderers for doing 'Helter Skelter', then we were Satan-worshippers and now we've wimped out." The song came together in the studio when Neil began humming along to a piano lick randomly played in the studio by drummer Tommy Lee. Sixx wrote the lyrics and the band had a hit single, charting at number 89 on the Billboard Hot 100, with a remixed version peaking at number 37 on the same chart seven years later in 1992. The video for the song was made when Sixx was deeply addicted to heroin. The bassist was so strung out during the shooting of the music video for "Home Sweet Home" that he wandered underneath a stage and began discussing "family, music and death" with an imaginary person. Country music star Carrie Underwood scored a hit in 2009 with her cover of the song.

"Louder Than Hell" was a track left over from the Shout at the Devil sessions which the band reworked and re-recorded. A demo version of the song with the original title of "Hotter Than Hell" was released on a 2003 remastered edition of Shout at the Devil.

The idea to record "Smokin' in the Boys Room", a cover of a 1973 hit by Brownsville Station, was Neil's. It was one of the first songs the band attempted when they first formed in 1981, but according to guitarist Mick Mars, "it was like 'uugghhyeechh'. We sounded like crap, I’ll tell ya." In the studio, Neil suggested they try it again "and it just worked", according to Mars, adding "I think it's because we've been together now for five years, and we know how to play with each other." The track "Keep Your Eye On the Money" saw Sixx hinting at serious self-reflection, with lines such as "Comedy and tragedy, entertainment or death" and "dancing on the blade" as "the crowd screams on for more" perhaps being reflections on the excesses of the previous two years. In "Save Our Souls", Sixx addresses his heroin addiction with the lines "For a life so good, it sure feels bad" and "It's been the hard road, edge of an overdose" foreshadowing his near fatal overdose later in the decade.

== Promotion ==
Mötley Crüe kicked off their Theatre of Pain world tour on July 7, 1985, with seven shows in Japan, culminating in a four-night run in Tokyo which sold out so quickly that promoters added a fifth show to satisfy demand. The band remained on the road for eight months, completing the tour in Paris, France, on March 3, 1986.

The video produced for "Smokin' in the Boys Room" took MTV by storm in the summer of 1985. The video expanded upon a theme common in 80s metal, the "put-upon high school nerd universe" in which relief from the forces of oppression is found through the power of heavy metal, exemplified so successfully by videos such as Twisted Sister's "We’re Not Gonna Take It" and "I Wanna Rock". The video was cited by Tipper Gore, leader of the activist group Parents Music Resource Center (PMRC), as a good example of how a band could project a "bad boy" image without resorting to sex, drugs, and violence. The "Smokin' in the Boys Room" video featured veteran horror movie icon Michael Berryman, perhaps best known for his performance in Wes Craven’s 1977 horror film "The Hills Have Eyes". Berryman would subsequently have a cameo appearance in the video for "Home Sweet Home". The album also had another link to the horror genre with the song "Save Our Souls" being featured in the 1985 Italian horror film Demons.

== Reception ==
Theatre of Pain enjoyed some commercial success upon its release in the early summer of 1985; the singles "Smokin' in the Boys Room" (which gave the band their first Top 20 hit) and "Home Sweet Home", both of which remained staples of the band's live sets for decades to come, helped the album reach number 6 in the Billboard chart, and into the top ten of three other charts globally. By 1995, ten years after release, it had achieved quadruple platinum status, similar to its predecessor, Shout at the Devil.

Professional ratings
Review scores
Source	Rating
AllMusic	4/5 stars
Collector's Guide to Heavy Metal	4/10
The Rolling Stone Album Guide	2.5/5 stars
Sputnikmusic	1.0/5

The album did not fare well critically. In their August 1985 review, People praised guitarist Mick Mars' work but found little else to applaud. The magazine called the album "thudding trash", with Neil's vocals and Sixx's songwriting taking the brunt of the criticism. The magazine felt that, while Theatre of Pain does contain some of the band's most accomplished work, the album ultimately "needs cosmetic surgery". Terry Atkinson of the Los Angeles Times declared that Sixx's lyrics "include some well-phrased lines", but ultimately declared that the album "plods along nondescriptly" with "punchless riffs", stating that the album "sounds as if it was produced by a machine in a youth-market research firm." Tim Holmes of Rolling Stone found Theatre of Pain to be the group's "most technically proficient album" while dismissing the heavy metal genre entirely, not understanding its growing popularity.

Robert Horning of PopMatters reviewed the albums Theatre of Pain and Girls, Girls, Girls in 2003, finding that "Both albums show a general lack of inspiration, both in the writing and the playing. The band's indifference is evident in the lyrics, which are nothing but a string of clichés stitched together with little concern for coherence"

The album has been credited, perhaps more so than any other release of its time and place, with transforming heavy metal from an album-oriented format to a singles-oriented format. The album was instrumental in inaugurating the pop-metal era which to many has become synonymous with the 1980s, with bands such as Poison, Cinderella and others following the Theatre of Pain example as the decade continued.

Sixx spoke about Theatre of Pain in 1987, declaring that "Some of that stuff is as polished as we've ever gotten, that's not good for this kind of music. But there was still plenty of dirty and grit on it - we can only get so polished. Polishing our music is like painting a garbage can." Vocalist Neil has referred to Theatre of Pain as his least favorite Mötley Crüe album, and bassist Sixx has referred to the album as "a pile of rubbish, the whole fucking record, with a few moments of maybe brilliance." Guitarist Mick Mars said in 1985 that the album was "more polished" than the band's previous releases, adding that the references to sex and violence were "not as blatant" on Theatre of Pain.

== Image change ==
Theatre of Pain saw the band drastically alter its image upon the album's release, and the move towards glam metal was not met with enthusiasm by some fans. The band's new glam metal look was panned by People Magazine, who slammed their new "sleekly eerie, pouty looks" which "might have been sent over by central casting." The magazine went as far as to refer to lead vocalist Vince Neil as "the hottest peroxide-blond hermaphrodite on the head-banger circuit" while Rocks Back Pages chided their "effeminate clothes". Some fans were dismayed when glamour shots began appearing in the heavy metal press which showed the band members sporting as much pink lace as they once did black leather. Guitarist Mars addressed the image change in a 1985 interview with The Georgia Straight: "We've always been a bit different looking band than anybody else. And everybody, now, is wearing lots of leather and studs and blowing out their hair and stuff. So it’s time for us to change, ’cause we don’t want to be stuck into that mainstream. It's just to be something different." The guitarist did admit years later that he had been uncomfortable with the band's move to glam metal during the Theatre of Pain era, saying "I went along with the makeup, but I never liked it. I looked like a really ugly old woman." Said Sixx of the move towards glam: "Hey, man, I like to look good, I wear make-up. Shit, President George Washington used to wear a wig and make-up. I mean, c'mon. If he can do it, I can do it."

== Track listing ==
All lyrics are written by Nikki Sixx, except "Smokin' in the Boys Room," with lyrics written by Cub Koda and Michael Lutz.

Side one
No.	Title	Music	Length
1.	"City Boy Blues"	Nikki Sixx; Mick Mars; Vince Neil	4:10
2.	"Smokin' in the Boys Room" (Brownsville Station cover)	Koda; Lutz	3:27
3.	"Louder Than Hell"	Sixx	2:32
4.	"Keep Your Eye on the Money"	Sixx	4:40
5.	"Home Sweet Home"	Sixx; Tommy Lee	3:59

Side two
No.	Title	Music	Length
6.	"Tonight (We Need a Lover)"	Sixx; Neil	3:37
7.	"Use It or Lose It"	Sixx; Mars; Neil; Lee	2:39
8.	"Save Our Souls"	Sixx; Neil	4:13
9.	"Raise Your Hands to Rock"	Sixx	2:48
10.	"Fight for Your Rights"	Sixx; Mars	3:50
Total length:			35:16

1999 Remastered Edition bonus tracks
No.	Title	Music	Length
11.	"Home Sweet Home" (Demo Version)	Sixx; Neil; Lee	4:23
12.	"Smokin' in the Boys Room" (Alternate Guitar Solo-Rough Mix)	Koda; Lutz	3:34
13.	"City Boy Blues" (Demo Version)	Sixx; Mars; Neil	4:28
14.	"Home Sweet Home" (Instrumental Rough Mix)	Sixx; Neil; Lee	2:57
15.	"Keep Your Eye on the Money" (Demo Version)	Sixx	3:48

2003 Remastered Edition bonus tracks
No.	Title	Music	Length
16.	"Tommy's Drum Piece from Cherokee Studios" (instrumental)	Lee	3:16
17.	"Home Sweet Home" (Music Video)	Sixx; Neil; Lee	15:51

== Personnel ==
Mötley Crüe

- Vince Neil – lead and backing vocals, harmonica
- Mick Mars – all electric, acoustic and slide guitars, backing vocals
- Nikki Sixx – bass, synthesizers, backing vocals
- Tommy Lee – drums, percussion, piano, backing vocals

Additional musicians

- Jay Winding – keyboards
- Mickey Raphael - harmonica on "Smokin' in the Boys' Room"
- Max Carl, John Batdorf – backing vocals
- Tom Werman – percussion

Production

- Tom Werman – producer
- Duane Baron – engineer, mixing
- Paul Wertheimer, Mark Wilczak, Matt Brady, Alex Woltman, Brian Scheuble – assistant engineers

== Charts ==
Chart (1985)	Peak position
Australian Albums (Kent Music Report)	39
Canada Top Albums/CDs (RPM)	9
Finnish Albums (The Official Finnish Charts)	5
German Albums (Offizielle Top 100)	44
Swedish Albums (Sverigetopplistan)	7
Swiss Albums (Schweizer Hitparade)	25
UK Albums (Official Charts)	36
US Billboard 200	6

Chart (2022)	Peak position
UK Rock & Metal Albums (Official Charts)	21

== Certifications ==
Region	Certification	Certified units/sales
Canada (Music Canada)	3× Platinum	300,000^{^}
United States (RIAA)	4× Platinum	4,000,000^{^}
^{^} Shipments figures based on certification alone.

== Uncensored video ==
Uncensored is the debut video release by Mötley Crüe in 1986 following the Theatre of Pain album/tour. The video features behind the scenes footage and music videos from the band's first three albums. Portions of the video are featured in the end credits of the band's 2019 biopic The Dirt.

Videos include:

1. "Take Me to the Top"
2. "Public Enemy #1"
3. "Live Wire"
4. "Looks That Kill"
5. "Too Young to Fall in Love"
6. "Smokin' in the Boys Room"
7. "Home Sweet Home"

=== Certification ===
Region	Certification	Certified units/sales
Australia (ARIA)	Platinum	15,000^{^}
United States (RIAA)	2× Platinum	200,000^{^}
^{^} Shipments figures based on certification alone.
