= Yeah! (Brownsville Station album) =

Studio album by Brownsville Station
- Released: August 1973
- Studio: Mediasound, New York City
- Genre: Rock, hard rock
- Label: Big Tree
- Producer: Doug Morris, Eric Stevens

Brownsville Station chronology
A Night on the Town (1972)	Yeah! (1973)	School Punks (1974)

Professional ratings
Review scores
Source	Rating
AllMusic	4.5/5 stars

Yeah! is the third studio album by the hard rock band Brownsville Station. It was their highest charting album, reaching number 98 on the Billboard 200.

The single "Smokin' in the Boy's Room" reached number three on U.S. Billboard Hot 100 chart and number 27 in the UK Singles Chart. Some British and Irish LP releases used the album title Smokin' in the Boy's Room.

== Track listing ==
Side one

1. "Question of Temperature" (Mike Appel, Ed Schnug, Don Henny) - 3:31
2. "Lightnin' Bar Blues" (Hoyt Axton) - 2:52
3. "Take It or Leave It" (H. Cardell) - 3:00
4. "All Night Long" (Mike Lutz, Cub Koda) - 2:55
5. "Let Your Yeah Be Yeah" (Jimmy Cliff) - 3:37

Side two

1. "Sweet Jane" (Lou Reed) - 3:02
2. "Love, Love, Love" (Terry Knight) - 2:55
3. "Go Out and Get Her" (Doug Morris) - 2:56
4. "Barefootin'" (Robert Parker) - 2:55
5. "Smokin' in the Boy's Room" (Mike Lutz, Cub Koda) - 2:57

== Personnel ==
Brownsville Station

- Cub Koda – guitar, vocals, harmonica
- Mike Lutz – bass, vocals
- Henry "H Bomb" Weck – drums

Technical

- Michael Delugg – engineer
- Beverly Weinstein – art direction
- Rob Nalli – photography
