= Cub Koda =

American musician (1948–2000)

- Koda in 1984

Background information
- Born: Michael John Uszniewicz; October 1, 1948; Detroit, Michigan, U.S.
- Died: July 1, 2000 (aged 51) Chelsea, Michigan, U.S.
- Genres: Rock; blues rock
- Occupations: Musician; songwriter; music critic
- Instruments: Guitar; vocals; harmonica
- Years active: 1963–2000

Michael John "Cub" Koda (né Uszniewicz; October 1, 1948 – July 1, 2000) was an American rock and roll musician, songwriter, and critic. Rolling Stone magazine considered him best known for writing the song "Smokin' in the Boys Room", recorded by his band Brownsville Station, which reached number 3 on the Billboard Hot 100 in 1974.

Offstage, Koda also co-wrote and edited the All Music Guide to the Blues, and Blues for Dummies, as well as selecting the tracks on the accompanying CDs. He also penned liner notes for bands such as the Trashmen, Jimmy Reed, J. B. Hutto, the Kingsmen, and the Miller Sisters.

== Early life ==
Koda was born in 1948 in Detroit, Michigan, to parents George and Lois Uszniewicz. In 1957, George changed the family name to "Koda," his mother's maiden name. Koda became interested in music as a boy, already playing drums at the age of five.

== Career ==
While attending high school in Manchester, Michigan, Koda formed a rock group, the Del-Tinos, who released their first single, a cover of Roy Orbison's "Go Go Go," in 1963. They released two more singles before disbanding in 1966. After attending Northern Michigan University for a year, Koda relocated to Ann Arbor, Michigan.

=== Brownsville Station ===
Koda formed Brownsville Station in Ann Arbor in 1969. The band originally consisted of Koda, drummer T. J. Cronley, bassist Tony Driggins, and guitarist Mike Lutz. Brownsville Station began performing throughout the American Midwest before releasing their first album, No BS, in 1970. The 1973 single "Smokin' in the Boys Room" remains their best-known song. It went to number 3 on the Billboard Hot 100 chart, sold over two million copies, and was later a hit for Mötley Crüe. They continued to perform until disbanding in 1979.

In the mid-1970s, Koda and Brownsville Station roadies created and recorded an intentionally inept oldies band named "King Uszniewicz and His Uszniewicztones" with Koda masquerading as frontman Ernie Uszniewicz on saxophone. The band recorded and pressed a 45 of "Surfin' School/Cry on My Shoulder" which was discreetly placed in Midwest thrift stores by members of Brownsville Station while on tour, creating the illusion amongst record collectors that the band had been real. The prank was furthered by four LPs released by Norton Records between 1989 and 2011, all of which feature a photo of the face of Koda's father George on the cover.

=== After Brownsville Station ===
After the breakup of Brownsville Station, Koda began producing one-man band tapes of rockabilly, blues, R&B, country, early rock and roll, and jazz, which he released as the album That's What I Like About the South. He also began writing for numerous music magazines, notably his column "The Vinyl Junkie" for Goldmine Magazine (later for DISCoveries). He wrote three volumes of the acclaimed Blues Masters series. He also wrote reviews and contributed to books published by AllMusic.

From late 1979 to late 1980, Koda began playing with three members of a Detroit-based band, Mugsy, calling themselves Cub Koda and the Points. Their eponymous debut album was released in early 1980 by the Boston-based Baron Records on hot pink vinyl. Also released was an EP, Shake Yo Cakes.

By 1980, Koda was performing with Hound Dog Taylor's backing band, the Houserockers, with guitarist Brewer Phillips and drummer Ted Harvey. They performed and recorded together for 15 years. The group's first album was It's the Blues, released in 1981. Their second album, The Joint Was Rockin', was released in 1996. Throughout the 1980s and 1990s, Koda continued his busy schedule of touring, recording, and writing. The compilation album Smokin' in the Boy's Room: The Best of Brownsville Station, was released by Rhino Records in 1993, and Welcome to My Job, a retrospective of his non-Brownsville recordings, was released by Blue Wave Records in the same year. The following year the album Abba Dabba Dabba: A Bananza of Hits was released by Schoolkids Records. He recorded a solo album, Box Lunch, released by J-Bird Records in 1997, and recordings he made with the Del-Tinos were released by Norton Records in 1998. He also re-formed Cub Koda and the Points and released Noise Monkeys (one of his last works) in 2000.

== Death ==
Koda died in Chelsea, Michigan, on July 1, 2000, aged 51. He had been suffering from kidney disease, which required dialysis. He is buried in Mount Hope Cemetery in Waterloo, Michigan. His headstone features a Fender amp, with a microphone and harmonica resting on top of it. "I Will Always Love You/If Only in my Dreams" is inscribed on the tablet. Koda was inducted into the Michigan Rock and Roll Legends Hall of Fame in 2016.
