= Music to Crash Your Car To: Vol. 2 =

Box set by Mötley Crüe
- Released: June 29, 2004
- Recorded: 1989–1994
- Genre: Heavy metal; glam metal; hard rock; alternative metal; grunge; industrial rock
- Length: 4:28:25
- Label: Mötley; Hip-O

Mötley Crüe chronology
Music to Crash Your Car To: Vol. 1 (2003)	Music to Crash Your Car To: Vol. 2 (2004)	Loud as Fuck (2004)

Professional ratings
Review scores
Source	Rating
AllMusic	3.5/5 stars
Chicago Tribune	(mixed)
The Rolling Stone Album Guide	2/5 stars

Music to Crash Your Car To: Vol. 2 is the second box set by the American glam metal band Mötley Crüe. It collects the albums Dr. Feelgood and Mötley Crüe, the EP Quaternary, and the compilations Decade of Decadence 81–91 and Supersonic and Demonic Relics.

== Content ==
The box set contains a rare comic book reprinting a 1989 issue of Rock 'N' Roll Comics and a double sided poster; one with the cover art and the other with the Decade of Decadence cover art. The album's title been ridiculed in the press for the title, considering the legal troubles of Vince Neil with regard to his 1984 drunk driving and vehicular manslaughter charge. The albums Generation Swine, Greatest Hits, and New Tattoo are not included.

== Track listing ==
Disc 1: Dr. Feelgood
No.	Title	Writer(s)	Length
1.	"T.N.T. (Terror 'N Tinseltown)"	Nikki Sixx	0:43
2.	"Dr. Feelgood"	Sixx; Mick Mars	4:50
3.	"Slice of Your Pie"	Sixx; Mars	4:31
4.	"Rattlesnake Shake"	Sixx; Mars; Vince Neil; Tommy Lee	3:40
5.	"Kickstart My Heart"	Sixx	4:43
6.	"Without You"	Sixx; Mars	4:29
7.	"Same Ol' Situation (S.O.S.)"	Sixx; Mars; Neil; Lee	4:13
8.	"Sticky Sweet"	Sixx; Mars	3:51
9.	"She Goes Down"	Sixx; Mars	4:36
10.	"Don't Go Away Mad (Just Go Away)"	Sixx; Mars	4:40
11.	"Time for Change"	Sixx; Donna McDaniel	4:59
12.	"Dr. Feelgood" (Demo)	Sixx; Mars	4:45
13.	"Without You" (Demo)	Sixx; Mars	4:15
14.	"Kickstart My Heart" (Demo)	Sixx	4:32
15.	"Get It for Free"	Sixx	4:16
16.	"Time for Change" (Demo)	Sixx; McDaniel	4:12

Disc 2: Dr. Feelgood / Decade of Decadence 81–91
No.	Title	Writer(s)	Length
1.	"Live Wire" (Kick Ass '91 Remix)	Sixx	3:17
2.	"Piece of Your Action" (Screamin' '91 Remix)	Sixx; Neil	4:40
3.	"Black Widow"	Sixx	4:25
4.	"Sinners and Saints"	Sixx; Mars	3:56
5.	"Knock 'em Dead Kid" (Demo)	Sixx; Mars	3:37
6.	"Mood Ring"	Sixx; Mars; Neil; Lee	2:23
7.	"Home Sweet Home" ('91 Remix)	Sixx; Neil; Lee	4:02
8.	"So Good, So Bad"	Sixx; Mars	3:56
9.	"Monsterous"	Sixx	1:03
10.	"Say Yeah"	Sixx	5:06
11.	"Kickstart My Heart" (Live)	Sixx	4:49
12.	"Dr. Feelgood" (Live)	Sixx; Mars	6:39
13.	"Teaser" (The Tommy Bolin Band cover)	Tommy Bolin; Jeff Cook	5:18
14.	"Rock 'n' Roll Junkie"	Sixx; Mars; Lee	4:03
15.	"Primal Scream"	Sixx; Mars; Neil; Lee	4:46
16.	"Angela"	Sixx; Mars; Neil; Lee	3:55
17.	"Anarchy in the U.K." (Sex Pistols cover)	Johnny Rotten; Steve Jones; Glen Matlock; Paul Cook	3:20

Disc 3: Mötley Crüe
No.	Title	Writer(s)	Length
1.	"Power to the Music"	Sixx; John Corabi; Mars; Lee	5:12
2.	"Uncle Jack"	Sixx; Corabi; Mars; Lee	5:29
3.	"Hooligan's Holiday"	Sixx; Corabi; Mars; Lee	5:42
4.	"Misunderstood"	Sixx; Corabi; Mars; Lee	7:03
5.	"Loveshine"	Sixx; Corabi; Mars; Lee	2:37
6.	"Poison Apples"	Sixx; Corabi; Mars; Lee; Bob Rock	3:40
7.	"Hammered"	Sixx; Corabi; Mars; Lee	5:16
8.	"Til Death Do Us Part"	Sixx; Corabi; Mars; Lee	6:03
9.	"Welcome to the Numb"	Sixx; Corabi; Mars; Lee	5:19
10.	"Smoke the Sky"	Sixx; Corabi; Mars; Lee	3:37
11.	"Droppin' Like Flies"	Sixx; Corabi; Mars; Lee	6:24
12.	"Driftaway"	Sixx; Corabi; Mars; Lee	3:58
13.	"Hypnotized"	Sixx; Corabi; Mars; Lee	5:27

Disc 4: Quaternary / Supersonic and Demonic Relics
No.	Title	Writer(s)	Length
1.	"Planet Boom"	Lee	3:49
2.	"Bittersuite" (Instrumental)	Mars	3:17
3.	"Father"	Sixx	3:59
4.	"Friends"	Corabi	2:29
5.	"Babykills"	Sixx; Corabi; Mars; Lee	5:25
6.	"10,000 Miles Away"	Sixx; Corabi; Mars; Lee	6:18
7.	"Hooligan's Holiday" (Extended Holiday Version by Skinny Puppy)	Sixx; Corabi; Mars; Lee	11:06
8.	"Hammered" (Demo)	Sixx; Corabi; Mars; Lee	4:38
9.	"Livin' in the No" (Demo)	Sixx; Corabi; Mars; Lee	4:24
10.	"Misunderstood" (Guitar Solo / Scream Version)	Sixx; Corabi; Mars; Lee	5:22
11.	"Hooligan's Holiday" (Derelict Version)	Sixx; Corabi; Mars; Lee	6:56
12.	"Misunderstood" (Successful Format Version)	Sixx; Corabi; Mars; Lee	4:37
13.	"Hooligan's Holiday" (Brown Nose Edit)	Sixx; Corabi; Mars; Lee	5:19

== Personnel ==
- Vince Neil – lead vocals, rhythm guitar, harmonica (Discs 1–2)
- John Corabi – lead vocals, rhythm guitar, six-string bass (Discs 3–4)
- Mick Mars – guitars, sitar, mandolin, backing vocals
- Nikki Sixx – bass, organ, piano, lead vocals ("Father")
- Tommy Lee – drums, percussion, synthesizer, backing vocals, lead vocals ("Planet Boom")
