= Shout at the Devil =

Studio album by Mötley Crüe
- Released: September 23, 1983
- Studios: Cherokee Studios, Hollywood, California
- Genres: Heavy metal; glam metal
- Length: 34:57
- Label: Elektra
- Producer: Tom Werman

Mötley Crüe chronology
Too Fast for Love (1981)	Shout at the Devil (1983)	Theatre of Pain (1985)

Alternative album cover

Singles from Shout at the Devil
- 1. "Shout at the Devil" Released: September 23, 1983; 2. "Looks That Kill" Released: January 1984; 3. "Helter Skelter" Released: May 1984; 4. "Too Young to Fall in Love" Released: June 1984

Shout at the Devil is the second album by the American heavy metal band Mötley Crüe, released on September 23, 1983. It was the band's breakthrough album, establishing Mötley Crüe as one of the top-selling heavy metal acts of the 1980s. The singles "Looks That Kill", "Too Young to Fall in Love" and "Shout at the Devil" were moderate hits for the band.

== Overview ==
Shout at the Devil was Mötley Crüe's breakthrough success, selling 200,000 copies in its first two weeks. The album's title and the band's use of a pentagram was briefly referenced by Tom Jarriel in a news piece on ABC about Christian groups concerned about Satanism. The pentagram was something Nikki Sixx brought with him from Sister, a very theatrical band he had been a member of (along with future W.A.S.P. vocalist Blackie Lawless) in the late 1970s prior to the formation of Mötley Crüe. Sister fused occult symbolism such as the Pentagram into a theatrical heavy metal show incorporating blood and facial makeup. Sixx asked Lawless for permission to use some of Sister's occult-related imagery for Shout at the Devil, as at that point Lawless was intent on moving in a different direction. "I said 'take whatever you want' because at that point, I realised that with an image like that, you end up painting yourself in a corner and you can't get out," said Lawless.

Just prior to returning home to Los Angeles to begin recording the album, Mötley Crüe had a brief five show support spot on Kiss' Creatures of the Night tour. Sixx later said that Gene Simmons commented on their hard partying.

At the December 31, 1982 "New Years' Evil" show in Santa Monica, Vince Neil announced from the stage before playing the then-new song "Red Hot" that the band's next album would be titled "Theater of Pain" and will be released in March 1983. The title - taken from the then-unreleased song "Black Widow" - ended up being used for their following album in 1985. The actual title track "Shout at the Devil" was also played at this show and introduced by Neil as being "about what happens when H.P. Lovecraft and Beelzebub come to visit your house". The title change was probably to avoid confusion with the then-recent "Only Theatre of Pain" album by another LA band, Christian Death.

During recording, bassist Sixx was involved in a serious car crash after drunkenly stealing a friend's Porsche in Los Angeles. At around the same time, actress and friend Demi Moore told Sixx he needed Alcoholics Anonymous, though Sixx dismissed her concerns. Sixx badly injured his shoulder in the crash and was prescribed Percocet, a combination of acetaminophen and the powerful opioid oxycodone which was commonly prescribed to treat severe short-term pain. Sixx's use of Percocet transitioned directly to a crippling addiction to heroin which would cost him $3,500 a day and almost claim his life later in the decade.

As the band toured with Ozzy Osbourne in support of Shout at the Devil, they discussed replacing guitarist Mick Mars. Mars was several years older than the other members of the band, and his bandmates were eager to add a more technically proficient guitarist in the vein of Yngwie Malmsteen. Bob Daisley, Osbourne's bassist, was present during the tour-bus discussion and told the band "do not try to fix something that isn't broken" when asked for his opinion. Daisley has said the band was serious at that time about replacing the guitarist. "They didn't have the balls", Mars said when asked about the prospect of being replaced. "But one day at rehearsal they went, 'Jake E. Lee would look good right here.' I went, 'I'm the guitar player in the band. Nobody else needs to be there.'"

As the tour continued, the band was invited to take part in the 1984 Monsters of Rock festival supporting Van Halen and headliners AC/DC. Guitarist Eddie Van Halen was bitten by Vince Neil during a dinner, with drummer Tommy Lee also biting Malcolm Young at some point. Van Halen and Young were both reportedly furious over this behaviour. Lee also became involved in a fistfight with David Lee Roth which saw Mötley Crüe expelled from their hotel. AC/DC and Van Halen both subsequently demanded Mötley Crüe be removed from the bill, but the band's popularity at that time made such a move difficult. The promoter came up with an unusual solution: Mötley Crüe would enter their trailer immediately upon arrival at the concert venue, and a large crane would then lift the trailer several meters off the ground to prevent the band members from leaving and causing trouble prior to their performance. They would also be required to leave the concert venue immediately following their performance. "You apologized every day", said manager Doc McGhee of Mötley Crüe's behaviour during this period, which eventually resulted in him having to pay a $15,000 deposit before any hotel would allow the band to stay. McGhee also established a rule in which each band member would submit to him a list of everything they had destroyed in a hotel before he'd allow them to check out.

It was an article published in the June 1984 issue of Hit Parader magazine that brought the band's shocking antics to national attention for the first time. Andy Secher, the magazine's editor, traveled to Mexico for an interview with the band and was shocked to find "this young woman, spread eagle on the bed, naked, and they're going at her with a wine bottle". Though Secher had to heavily sanitize the story before it could be printed, the depiction of the band's behaviour nonetheless shocked America and created a firestorm of controversy which saw some retailers threaten to remove the magazine from its shelves. The magazine not only survived, but soon saw its readership increase dramatically, with Secher saying "We happened to hit perfectly with Mötley Crüe. That June issue was on the stands in April, just when Shout At The Devil was peaking."

"Looks That Kill" was a moderate hit for the band and played a large role in exposing the band to a wider audience. The music video produced for the song was shot over the course of an 18-hour day on the main sound stage at A&M Records in Los Angeles. Model Wendy Barry, who portrayed the "warrior princess" in the "Looks That Kill" music video, has said her experience with the band was very positive, describing Mötley Crüe as "all very nice. Really down-to-earth and fun", in stark contrast with their growing reputation for depravity. While Barry acknowledges the music video "generated a stir", she later said of it "I personally thought it was just a well-executed video as far as production, and the song was killer." A year later Barry would appear again with Sixx and Lee in the music video for Ratt's "Back For More".

The song "Bastard" was targeted by Tipper Gore and the PMRC, who were behind the move to have warning labels placed on albums with lyrics or other content they found disturbing. According to Mick Mars, the song wasn't a call to violence but rather was about "a certain person that we used to work with that we felt we were stabbed in the back by."

"Knock 'Em Dead, Kid" was inspired by a violent encounter between Sixx and a group of Hells Angels. Sixx somehow wound up in a fight with a group of bikers, even hitting one member in the face with a chain he had been wearing as a belt. The Hells Angels turned out to be undercover cops, and the bassist was subsequently badly beaten and jailed, resulting in a black eye and broken cheekbone. After being released from jail, he was inspired to write a song about the ordeal.

The album also features a cover of The Beatles' 1968 song "Helter Skelter", a song that allegedly inspired cult leader Charles Manson. Sixx was not a Beatles' fan, referring to the band as "fucking wimpy", but he lists "Helter Skelter" and The White Album among his favorites of all time.

== Reception ==
Professional ratings
Review scores
Source	Rating
AllMusic	4.5/5 stars
Collector's Guide to Heavy Metal	8/10
Metal Forces	9/10
Rolling Stone	2/5 stars
The Rolling Stone Album Guide	2/5 stars
The Village Voice	D

In a contemporary review for The Village Voice, Robert Christgau panned Shout at the Devil and felt the band's commercial appeal lay in false braggadocio on an album that is poor "even by heavy metal standards". Rolling Stone's J. D. Considine found their style of rock formulaic, innocuous, and unoriginal: "The whole point of bands like Motley Crue is to provide cheap thrills to jaded teens, and that's where the album ultimately disappoints." In The Rolling Stone Album Guide (2004), he dismissed the music as "a distressingly mild-mannered distillation of Kiss and Aerosmith clichés". In 2017, the same magazine would later go on to rank the album at 44th, in the list of "The 100 Greatest Metal Albums of All Time". On the contrary, Dave Constable of Metal Forces wrote that Mötley Crüe had "possibly come up with the major label metal LP of '83."

AllMusic's Barry Weber was more positive in a retrospective review, referring to the album as their best, displaying Mötley Crüe's "sleazy and notorious (yet quite entertaining) metal at its best." Canadian journalist Martin Popoff considered Shout at the Devil inferior to Mötley's debut album, but found its music extremely addictive if unoriginal, calling it "punk rocking lobotomy metal". Adrian Begrand of PopMatters called the album a sleazy and menacing "timeless L.A. metal classic". In his opinion, the album contained the band's best singles and "remains to this day Mötley Crüe's finest hour".

Shout at the Devil was named one of "The Best 25 Heavy Metal Albums of All Time" in the book Sound of the Beast: The Complete Headbanging History of Heavy Metal, by Ian Christe.

Ultimate Classic Rock's Eduardo Rivadavia gave much praise to the album calling it the, "ultimate L.A. glam metal album", and called the band, "the first heavy metal band to truly cross over from the male to female audience, which automatically doubled the band’s fan-base-building prospects".

"Without this album, a lot of the great hair metal bands wouldn't have come about," observed Satchel of Steel Panther. "Theatre of Pain was more of their glam look, but Shout at the Devil was such a great record. It was fuckin' sick. They set the bar. People looked at that and said, 'Fuck, we gotta dress up cool, man.'

Shout at the Devil peaked at No. 17 on the Billboard 200. The singles "Looks That Kill" and "Too Young to Fall in Love", peaked at No.54 and No.90 respectively on the Billboard Hot 100 in 1984, while "Shout at the Devil" peaked at No. 30 on the Mainstream Rock chart. The album was awarded 4× Platinum (reaching the four million mark in shipments) on May 15, 1997.

"When a band like us put out Shout at the Devil," Sixx observed in 2000, "and the label does zero marketing, zero publicity and takes zero trade adverts, and you sell five million records, then everybody starts patting themselves on the back. But it's Mötley Crüe that did that, not Elektra Records."

== Track listing ==
=== Original release ===
All tracks are written by Nikki Sixx, except where noted.

Side one
No.	Title	Lyrics	Music	Length
1.	"In the Beginning"		Geoff Workman	1:13
2.	"Shout at the Devil"			3:16
3.	"Looks That Kill"			4:07
4.	"Bastard"			2:54
5.	"God Bless the Children of the Beast"	(instrumental)	Mick Mars	1:33
6.	"Helter Skelter" (The Beatles cover)	Lennon–McCartney	Lennon–McCartney	3:09

Side two
No.	Title	Lyrics	Music	Length
1.	"Red Hot"		Sixx; Mars; Vince Neil	3:20
2.	"Too Young to Fall in Love"			3:34
3.	"Knock 'em Dead, Kid"		Sixx; Neil	3:43
4.	"Ten Seconds to Love"	Sixx; Neil		4:17
5.	"Danger"		Sixx; Mars; Neil	3:51
Total length:				34:57

=== 2003 remastered edition ===
In 2003, the band re-issued their albums on their own label Mötley Records, including added bonus tracks from each album's specific era. The bonus tracks of the remastered edition of Shout at the Devil are mainly composed of demos, but include also the previously unreleased song "I Will Survive", which was recorded in the same sessions. The song "Black Widow", included in the Red, White & Crüe compilation, was also recorded and left off this album. The track "Hotter than Hell" was later renamed and re-recorded into "Louder Than Hell" on the Theatre of Pain album. This edition also sports a warning that the album may contain masked backwards messages. This is in reference to Sixx and Lee chanting "Jesus is Satan" as an underdub on the title track.

2003 Remastered edition bonus tracks
No.	Title	Writer(s)	Length
12.	"Shout at the Devil" (Demo)		3:18
13.	"Looks That Kill" (Demo)		5:06
14.	"Hotter Than Hell" (Demo Version of "Louder Than Hell")		2:49
15.	"I Will Survive" (Unreleased Track)	Sixx; Mars	3:19
16.	"Too Young to Fall in Love" (Demo)		3:03
Total length:			51:32

A limited edition "Mini-LP" Compact Disc version of the album was released in the Japanese market, featuring the original cover that was previously available only on the vinyl LP release.

=== 2023 40th anniversary edition ===
In 2023, Mötley Crüe unveiled the "Year Of The Devil," a reissue campaign commemorating the 40th anniversary of "Shout of the Devil," featuring a limited edition box set that includes the remastered album in various formats, original singles, a Séance board, tarot cards, and a collection of demo tracks titled "Shout At The Demos & Rarities."

== Personnel ==
Mötley Crüe

- Vince Neil – lead vocals
- Mick Mars – electric and acoustic guitars, backing vocals
- Nikki Sixx – bass, bass pedals, backing vocals
- Tommy Lee – drums, Simmons drums, backing vocals

Additional performer

- Alister Fiend – narration on "In the Beginning"

Production

- Tom Werman – production
- Geoff Workman – engineering
- Doug Schwartz – assistant engineering
- George Marino – mastering at Sterling Sound, New York

Artwork

- Bob Defrin – cover art

== Charts ==
=== Album ===
1984 chart performance for Shout at the Devil
Chart (1984)	Peak position
Australian Albums (Kent Music Report)	85
Canada Top Albums/CDs (RPM)	23
Finnish Albums (The Official Finnish Charts)	18
US Billboard 200	17

2022 chart performance for Shout at the Devil
Chart (2022)	Peak position
Swiss Albums (Schweizer Hitparade)	59
UK Independent Albums (Official Charts)	36
UK Rock & Metal Albums (Official Charts)	10

2023 chart performance for Shout at the Devil
Chart (2023)	Peak position
German Albums (Offizielle Top 100)	42
Spanish Albums (Promusicae)	70
Swedish Albums (Sverigetopplistan)	13

=== Singles ===
Year	Title	Chart	Position
1983	"Shout at the Devil"	US Mainstream Rock (Billboard)	30
1984	"Looks that Kill"	US Billboard Hot 100	54
1984	"Too Young to Fall in Love"	US Billboard Hot 100	90

== Certifications ==
Region	Certification	Certified units/sales
Australia (ARIA)	Gold	35,000^{^}
Canada (Music Canada)	3× Platinum	300,000^{^}
United States (RIAA)	4× Platinum	4,000,000^{^}
^{^} Shipments figures based on certification alone.
