= Looks That Kill =

Single by Mötley Crüe

from the album Shout at the Devil
- Released: January 1984 (US)
- Recorded: 1983
- Genre: Heavy metal; glam metal
- Length: 4:07
- Label: Elektra
- Songwriter: Nikki Sixx
- Producer: Tom Werman

Mötley Crüe singles chronology
"Shout at the Devil" (1983)	"Looks That Kill" (1984)	"Too Young to Fall in Love" (1984)

Music videos
- "Looks That Kill" on YouTube

"Looks That Kill" is a song by American heavy metal band Mötley Crüe. It was released as a single in January 1984. The song is considered one of their best. It has regularly featured in Mötley Crüe's live performances. The video marked the band's inaugural appearance on mainstream MTV.

== Background ==
The track was written by bassist Nikki Sixx and spent 10 weeks on the Billboard Hot 100 chart in the United States, peaking at #54. On the Mainstream Rock Tracks chart, it peaked at #12.

== Music video ==
The music video was filmed at A&M Records' main sound stage. It features the band in a post-apocalyptic setting where they trap a group of women in a cage while performing the song. In the middle of the video, the warrior queen (played by Wendy Barry) appears to release the women before confronting the band. The band follows and surrounds her, but she disappears, leaving a flaming pentagram on the ground.

== Track listing ==
1. "Looks That Kill" – 4:07
2. "Piece of Your Action"

== Personnel ==
- Vince Neil – vocals
- Mick Mars – guitar
- Nikki Sixx – bass
- Tommy Lee – drums, percussion

== Charts ==
Chart (1984)	Peak position
US Billboard Hot 100	54
US Mainstream Rock (Billboard)	12
