= Leathür Records =

Record label of American rock band Mötley Crüe

- Founded: 1981
- Founder: Mötley Crüe
- Defunct: 1986
- Status: Inactive
- Distributor(s): Greenworld Distribution
- Genre: Hard rock; heavy metal; glam metal
- Country of origin: United States
- Location: Los Angeles, California

Leathür Records was American glam metal band Mötley Crüe's original record label that was also owned by their original manager Allan Coffman. Leathür's only releases were the band's 1981 debut studio album Too Fast for Love and their debut single, "Stick to Your Guns".

Leathür Records was manufactured and distributed by Greenworld Distribution of Torrance, California in what is referred to as a "pressing & distribution" (p&d) deal. The band retained ownership of the masters while Greenworld maintained the exclusive license to manufacture and distribute the album. Greenworld subsequently renamed the division that was supporting the Mötley Crüe project as Enigma Records and it is considered the first official Enigma Records release.

Mötley Crüe was then picked up by Elektra Records and the record was ordered to be re-mixed for re-release. The Canadian WEA release of the album in June 1982 featured the original Leathür mixes and not the Elektra re-mixes by Roy Thomas Baker released elsewhere.

The band parted ways with Elektra in 1997 and founded Mötley Records, which is distributed by Better Noise Music. The label released all their classic albums before New Tattoo. The entire catalog is now owned by BMG Rights Management.

== See also ==
- List of record labels
