= Smokin' in the Boys Room =

1973 single by Brownsville Station

- One of side-A labels of US single

Single by Brownsville Station

from the album Yeah!
- B-side: "Barefootin'"
- Released: October 1973
- Recorded: 1973
- Studio: Mediasound, New York City
- Genre: Hard rock; boogie rock
- Length: 2:58
- Label: Big Tree
- Songwriters: Cub Koda, Michael Lutz
- Producers: Doug Morris, Brilliant Sun

Brownsville Station singles chronology
"Let Your Yeah Be Yeah" (1973)	"Smokin' in the Boys Room" (1973)	"Kings of the Party" (1974)

"Smokin' in the Boys Room" (also spelled "Smokin' in the Boy's Room") is a song by the American rock band Brownsville Station, released in October 1973 as the second and final single from their third studio album, Yeah!. It peaked at number 3 both in Canada and on the US Billboard Hot 100, and was later certified gold by the RIAA.

The song is about students hoping to avoid being caught violating their school's smoking ban by smoking cigarettes in the boys' restroom. It begins with a spoken recitation, and the verses and a part of the chorus are mostly spoken, rather than sung.

== Charts ==
=== Weekly charts ===
(1973–1974)	Peak position
Australia (Kent Music Report)	9
Canada RPM Top Singles	3
France	7
UK	27
US Billboard Hot 100	3
US Cash Box Top 100	2

=== Year-end charts ===
(1974)	Rank
Australia (Kent Music Report)	74
Canada	54
US Billboard Hot 100	44
US Cash Box	47

== Certifications ==
Region	Certification	Certified units/sales
United States (RIAA)	Gold	1,000,000^{^}
^{^} Shipments figures based on certification alone.

== Mötley Crüe version ==
"Smokin' in the Boys Room"

Single by Mötley Crüe

from the album Theatre of Pain
- B-side: "Use it or Lose it"
- Released: June 24, 1985
- Recorded: 1985, Los Angeles
- Genre: Glam metal; hard rock
- Length: 3:22
- Label: Elektra
- Songwriters: Cub Koda, Michael Lutz
- Producer: Tom Werman

Mötley Crüe singles chronology
"Too Young to Fall in Love" (1984)	"Smokin' in the Boys Room" (1985)	"Home Sweet Home" (1985)

Music videos
- "Smokin' in the Boys Room" on YouTube

"Smokin' in the Boys Room" was covered by the American glam metal band Mötley Crüe. It was released on June 24, 1985 as the lead single from their third studio album, Theatre of Pain. The song peaked at number 16 on the U.S. Billboard Hot 100, becoming Mötley Crüe's first Top 40 hit. Their version of the song appears in the 1986 film The Wraith directed by Chieffallo. Another cover by LeAnn Rimes appears on the album Nashville Outlaws: A Tribute to Mötley Crüe.

=== Music video ===
Mötley Crüe's version was accompanied by a music video featuring Michael Berryman as the school principal. It focuses on a high school student named Jimmy who is mistreated and misunderstood in school. After he is paddled by the principal for (truthfully) claiming that a dog ran off with his homework, a frustrated Jimmy goes to the boys' bathroom, where he sees Motley Crüe in the mirrors. The band pulls him through the mirror to join them, and Jimmy and Motley Crüe watch a dystopian vision of the school through a barred window. At the end of the music video, the principal apologizes to Jimmy and offers an A for his missing homework; Jimmy doesn't accept and rips up the homework. After Jimmy walks away, the band's bassist, Nikki Sixx, reaches out of the mirror and snatches the dumbfounded principal's toupée.

=== Charts ===
Chart (1985)	Peak position
Australia (Kent Music Report)	61
Canada Top Singles (RPM)	19
UK Singles (Official Charts)	71
US Billboard Hot 100	16
US Mainstream Rock (Billboard)	7

=== Personnel ===
- Vince Neil - Vocals
- Mick Mars - Guitar
- Nikki Sixx - Bass
- Tommy Lee - Drums
- Mickey Raphael - Harmonica

== Other versions ==
The song is referenced in the television program King of the Hill in season 10, episode 10. Brownsville Station is the favorite band of the character Lucky (played by Tom Petty). The song "inspired him to smoke" and plays over the ending credits.
