= Too Fast for Love =

Studio album by Mötley Crüe
- Released: August 16, 1982 (Elektra version): November 10, 1981 (Leathür version) 2003 (Mötley CD bonus tracks)
- Recorded: September 1981
- Studios: Hit City West, Los Angeles, California
- Genres: Glam punk; glam metal; heavy metal
- Length: 34:04 (Elektra version): 39:27 (Leathür version) 51:45 (2003 Mötley CD bonus tracks)
- Labels: Leathür; Elektra; Mötley
- Producer: Mötley Crüe

Mötley Crüe chronology
Too Fast for Love (1982)	Shout at the Devil (1983)

Singles from Too Fast for Love
- 1. "Stick to Your Guns" Released: April 24, 1981; 2. "Merry-Go-Round" Released: August 16, 1982

Too Fast for Love is the debut studio album by American heavy metal band Mötley Crüe. The first edition of 900 copies was released on November 10, 1981, on the band's original label Leathür Records.

Billboard noted in 1987 that Greenworld Distribution, the parent company of what would become Enigma Records, had "helped break" Mötley Crüe during this period.

Elektra Records signed the band the following year, at which point the album was remixed and partially re-recorded. This re-release, with a different track listing and slightly different artwork (e.g., red lettering on the cover and a different interior photograph of the band), has become the standard version from which all later reissues derive. The re-recorded album also removed the song "Stick to Your Guns", though it is featured on a bonus track version of the album. The original mix of the album remained unreleased on CD until 2002, when it was included in the Music to Crash Your Car To: Vol. 1 box set compilation.

While the album only reached number 77 on the Billboard 200 album chart in the United States, it would ultimately reach platinum status.

== Release history ==
The first recording session was in September 1981, a half year after the band first played the Starwood nightclub. They recorded for a few days with engineer Avi Kipper at Hit City West, a small studio in South Robertson, Los Angeles

There are three known vinyl pressings of the Leathür Records version, along with one known cassette. The first vinyl pressing had white lettering on the cover and the record label was white with black lettering. The back cover photo of Vince Neil shows him with a large airbrushed hairdo. The second pressing has red lettering on the cover and the record label is again white with black lettering. The second pressing has a slightly different photo insert of the band. The third pressing has red lettering on the cover and the record label is black with white lettering.

The album was remixed under the supervision of Roy Thomas Baker and rereleased on August 20, 1982, by Elektra Records, with whom the band signed its first recording contract. The Elektra version had a different track order and omitted "Stick to Your Guns", as well as the first verse from the title track. In addition, a re-recorded (and shorter) version of "Come On and Dance" appears on the re-release. However, the initial release of the album on Elektra in Canada (on both vinyl and cassette) was not the remixed version, but instead the original Leathür version with an Elektra label on it, and it included "Stick to Your Guns". This was released two months before the remixed version was released by Elektra worldwide, because Mötley Crüe was about to embark on a Canadian tour and Elektra wanted to ensure a product was available while the band was in the country. When the remixed version was completed, later Canadian pressings were the same as the Elektra version everywhere else. "It was amazing because everyone had passed on us first time around..." Neil observed in 2000. "We were just happy that someone was prepared to mass-produce our records and that we could go out on real tours."

In 1996, Mötley Crüe and Elektra split. The band once again formed their own record company, Mötley Records, and rereleased all the albums before New Tattoo. The 2002 version of Too Fast for Love adds the Leathür version of "Too Fast for Love", "Stick to Your Guns" (omitted from the Elektra release), "Toast of the Town" (previously released as a B-side to Leathür's "Stick to Your Guns" single), the Raspberries cover song "Tonight" and a live version of "Merry-Go-Round".

== Reception ==
Professional ratings
Review scores
Source	Rating
AllMusic	4/5 stars
Collector's Guide to Heavy Metal	9/10
Metal Storm	8.8/10
PopMatters	favorable
The Rolling Stone Album Guide	2.5/5 stars

Too Fast for Love received mixed reviews on release; most reviewers found the music derivative and unoriginal with negative comments about the band's singing and playing, though a number did like the speed and rawness of the sound.

Retrospective reviews have been a lot more favorable. AllMusic reviewer Steve Huey gave the album a rating of four stars and said that "Mötley Crüe essentially comes across as a bash-'em-out bar band, making up in enthusiasm what they lack in technical skill". Martin Popoff, in his Collector's Guide to Heavy Metal, gave the album a 9/10.

Too Fast for Love was the earliest of seven consecutive Mötley Crüe studio albums to be certified gold or platinum by the RIAA―every album up to and including Generation Swine (1997) is at least certified gold.

In 2018, Collin Brennan of Consequence included the album in his list of "10 Hair Metal Albums That Don’t Suck".

== Track listings ==
1981 Leathür Records original release

All tracks are written by Nikki Sixx (*), except where noted.

Side one
No.	Title	Writer(s)	Length
1.	"Live Wire"		3:14
2.	"Public Enemy #1"	*; Lizzie Grey	4:22
3.	"Take Me to the Top"		3:43
4.	"Merry-Go-Round"		3:22
5.	"Piece of Your Action"	*; Vince Neil (lyrics)	4:39

Side two
No.	Title	Writer(s)	Length
6.	"Starry Eyes"		4:28
7.	"Stick to Your Guns"		4:20
8.	"Come On and Dance"		3:11
9.	"Too Fast for Love"		4:11
10.	"On with the Show"	*; Neil (lyrics)	4:07
Total length:			39:37

1982 Elektra version

Side one
No.	Title	Writer(s)	Length
1.	"Live Wire"		3:14
2.	"Come On and Dance"		2:47
3.	"Public Enemy #1"	*; Grey	4:22
4.	"Merry-Go-Round"		3:22
5.	"Take Me to the Top"		3:43

Side two
No.	Title	Writer(s)	Length
6.	"Piece of Your Action"	*; Neil (lyrics)	4:39
7.	"Starry Eyes"		4:28
8.	"Too Fast for Love"		3:22
9.	"On with the Show"	*; Neil (lyrics)	4:07
Total length:			34:04

2003 Mötley Records CD release bonus tracks
No.	Title	Writer(s)	Length
10.	"Toast of the Town" (B-side of the 1981 "Stick to Your Guns" single)	*; Mick Mars (music)	3:35
11.	"Tonight" (Raspberries cover)	Eric Carmen	4:27
12.	"Too Fast for Love" (alternate intro)		4:19
13.	"Stick to Your Guns"		4:23
14.	"Merry-Go-Round" (live in San Antonio, Texas)		3:56
15.	"Live Wire" (video)		51:45

== Personnel ==
Mötley Crüe

- Vince Neil – lead vocals
- Mick Mars – guitars, backing vocals
- Nikki Sixx – bass, backing vocals on «Toast of the Town» and «Tonight»
- Tommy Lee – drums, backing vocals

Production

- Mötley Crüe – production
- Gleen Felt – engineering
- Robert Battaglia – additional engineering
- Azi Kipper – additional engineering
- Michael Wagener – engineering, mixing
- Jo Hansch – mastering
- Bradley Gilderman – additional overdubs and edits
- Gordon Fordyce – remixing
- Roy Thomas Baker – remixing advising

== Charts ==
Chart (1984)	Peak position
US Billboard 200	77

Chart (2022–2026)	Peak position
Norwegian Physical Albums (IFPI Norge)	4
Scottish Albums (Official Charts)	77
Swiss Albums (Schweizer Hitparade)	95
UK Independent Albums (Official Charts)	31
UK Rock & Metal Albums (Official Charts)	17

== Certifications ==
Region	Certification	Certified units/sales
Canada (Music Canada)	Gold	50,000^{^}
United States (RIAA)	Platinum	1,000,000^{^}
^{^} Shipments figures based on certification alone.

== Accolades ==
Publication	Country	Accolade	Rank
Revolver	U.S.	6 Glam-Metal Albums You Need to Own	1
PopMatters	U.S.	10 Essential Glam Metal Albums	1
Consequence of Sound	U.S.	10 Hair Metal Albums That Don't Suck	1
Rolling Stone	U.S.	50 Greatest Hair Metal Albums of All Time	9
Rolling Stone	U.S.	100 Greatest Metal Albums of All Time	22
L.A. Weekly	U.S.	Chuck Klosterman's Favorite Hair Metal Albums	8
Guitar World	U.S.	Top 20 Hair Metal Albums of the Eighties	1
Ultimate Classic Rock	U.S.	Top 30 Glam Metal Albums	1

== See also ==
- List of glam metal albums and songs
