= Brownsville Station (band) =

American rock band

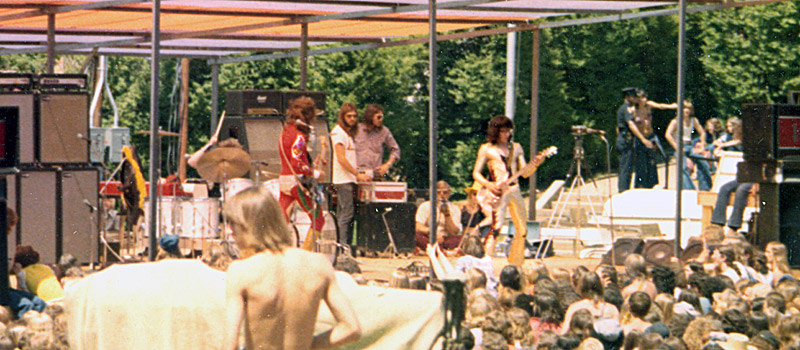
- Brownsville Station performing in Charlotte, North Carolina in 1972

Background information
- Origin: Ann Arbor, Michigan, United States
- Genres: Rock, hard rock, glam rock
- Years active: 1969–1979, 2012–present
- Labels: Warner Bros., Palladium, Big Tree, Wounded Bird, Private Stock, Epic, Rhino, Atlantic
- Members: Mike Lutz; Henry "H-Bomb" Weck; Billy Craig; Arlen Viecelli; Brad Johnson
- Past members: Cub Koda; T.J. Cronley; Tony Driggins; Bruce Nazarian; Andy Patalan

Brownsville Station is an American rock band from Michigan popular in the 1970s. Original members included Cub Koda (guitarist/vocalist), Mike Lutz (guitarist/vocalist), T.J. Cronley (drummer), and Tony Driggins (bassist/vocals). Later members included Henry "H-Bomb" Weck (drummer) and Bruce Nazarian (guitarist/vocalist).

They are primarily remembered for the top-10 hit single "Smokin' in the Boys Room" (1973).

== History ==
=== Early history ===
Brownsville Station was formed in Ann Arbor, Michigan, in 1969. Their early albums included song covers from bands which had inspired them. In 1970, they released their debut studio album, No BS, on a Warners Bros. label. Their biggest hit, "Smokin' in the Boys Room", written by Michael Lutz & Cub Koda, from their 1973 album Yeah!, reached No. 3 on U.S. Billboard Hot 100 chart and No. 27 in the UK Singles Chart. The track sold over two million copies and was awarded a gold disc status by the RIAA on 15 January 1974.

=== Later history ===
In 1977, Brownsville Station recorded "Martian Boogie", one of their seven singles to chart on the Hot 100. The song was also a feature on Dr. Demento's radio show. "(Lady) Put The Light On", their penultimate single, also charted in the Hot 100, at 46.

After drummer Cronley left the band, Van Wert, Ohio, native Henry "H-Bomb" Weck was called on to fill the position left by Cronley.

The band's second-highest Billboard charting single was "Kings of the Party" which topped out at No. 31 in 1974.

Original members of Brownsville Station disbanded in 1979 and their final studio album together, Air Special, was released by Epic in 1978.

Cub Koda was the most visible Brownsville Station member after their break up. He recorded a number of solo albums and toured with his own group The Points as well as blues man Hound Dog Taylor's backing band The Houserockers. His solo repertoire included the albums Cub Koda and the Points, It's the Blues, Box Lunch and the career spanning compilation Welcome to My Job. In addition, Koda, a rabid collector of rockabilly, doo wop and blues, wrote liner notes for numerous retro releases (including Jimmy Reed, Freddy Cannon and The Kingsmen) and countless music reviews for the All Music Guide series of books and website. He also wrote a popular column ("The Vinyl Junkie") for Goldmine magazine and co-authored the book Blues For Dummies. In addition, he hosted The Cub Koda Crazy Show for Massachusetts radio station WCGY during a period in the early 1980s. Koda died of kidney disease in July 2000 at the age of 51.

Mike Lutz went on to produce many bands, including Ted Nugent's Spirit of the Wild album, and toured in the 1990s with Nugent. Lutz still resides in Ann Arbor, teaches guitar and bass at a local music store called Oz's Music, writes and produces many acts.

While still in Brownsville Station, Henry Weck engineered and co-produced the Strikes album for Blackfoot, which produced two hit singles, "Highway Song" and "Train Train" (on which Koda played harmonica). Weck continues to record and produce in Memphis, in Ann Arbor at Lutz's Tazmania Studios and is the co-driving force of the re-united Brownsville Station.

After T. J. Cronley left Brownsville Station, he spent a career in the U.S. Marine Corps as a Marine aviator, and retired as a lieutenant colonel in 1992. He is currently a pilot for FedEx and resides in Yuma, Arizona. He is also an artist.

Bruce Nazarian went on to produce, engineer and perform with his band "The Automatix", who released their debut LP on MCA in 1983. He was the CEO of Digital Media Consulting Group and ran a popular digital media website "TheDigitalGuy.com". Nazarian also produced and hosted The Digital Guy radio show in addition to being a music producer, concert impresario and artist manager. His last band, "The Brotherhood" is slated to release their debut CD "(It's) All About The Groove" in early 2016. Nazarian died in October 2015.

In 2008, Brownsville Station was inducted into the Michigan Rock and Roll Legends Hall of Fame.

Through the band's early days, Weck captured over 500 hours of Brownsville demos, rehearsals, live shows and even some special events. In 2012, Lutz and Weck began sorting through the recordings in Lutz's Tazmania Studio. The result is Still Smokin', featuring new songs and updated versions of the band's "My Friend Jack" and "Smokin' in the Boys Room".

Augmented by new players Billy Craig, Arlen Viecelli and Brad Johnson, Brownsville Station returned to the road in 2013.

== In popular culture ==
In the television series King of the Hill, Brownsville Station is part of the subplot of "Hank Fixes Everything" (Season 10, Episode 10), reuniting for the "Still Smokin' in the Boys Room" tour.

== Influences ==
Brownsville Station's early influences included Chuck Berry, Bo Diddley, Jerry Lee Lewis, and other 1950s rock and roll musicians. Koda's onstage antics influenced many rockers including Peter Wolf and Alice Cooper.

== Band members ==
=== Current ===
- Mike Lutz - lead vocals, guitar, bass, keyboards (1969–1979, 2012–present)
- Henry "H Bomb" Weck - drums, vocals (1972–1979, 2012–present)
- Billy Craig - guitar, vocals (2012–present)
- Arlen Viecelli - guitar, vocals (2013–present)
- Brad Johnson - bass, vocals (2013–present)

=== Former ===
- Cub Koda - guitar, lead vocals, harmonica (1969–1979; died 2000)
- T.J. Cronley - drums (1969–1971)
- Tony Driggins - bass, vocals (1969–1972)
- Bruce Nazarian - guitar, lead vocals, keyboards, bass (1975–1979; died 2015)
- Andy Patalan - guitar, vocals (2012–2013)

== Discography ==
=== Albums ===
Year	Album	Peak positions
Year	Album	US
1970	No BS	—
1972	A Night on the Town	191
1973	Yeah!	98
1974	School Punks	170
1975	Motor City Connection	204
1977	Brownsville Station	—
1978	Air Special	—
2012	Still Smokin'	—

=== Compilations ===
- 1993: Smokin' in the Boys Room: The Best of Brownsville Station
- 2003: Smokin' in the Boys Room and Other Hits
- 2005: Smokin' in the Boys Room
- 2006: Rhino Hi-Five: Brownsville Station

=== Singles ===
Year	Single (A-side, B-side) Both sides from same album except where indicated	Peak positions				Album
Year	Single (A-side, B-side) Both sides from same album except where indicated	US Cashbox	US Hot 100	Canada	UK Singles	Album
1969	"Rock & Roll Holiday" b/w "Jailhouse Rock"	—	—	—	—	Non-album tracks
1970	"Be-Bop Confidential" b/w "City Life"	—	—	—	—	No BS
1971	"Roadrunner" b/w "Do The Bosco"	—	—	—	—	No BS
1971	"That's Fine" b/w "Tell Me All About It"	—	—	—	—	Non-album tracks
1972	"Rock With The Music" b/w "Country Flavor"	—	—	—	—	A Night On The Town
1972	"The Red Back Spider" b/w "Rock With The Music" (from A Night On The Town)	85	96	—	—	Non-album track
1973	"Let Your Yeah Be Yeah" b/w "Mister Robert" (from A Night On The Town)	60	57	—	54 (Note: Chart position is from the official UK "Breakers List".)	Yeah!
1973	"Smokin' in the Boys Room" b/w "Barefootin'"	2	3	3	27	Yeah!
1974	"I'm The Leader Of The Gang"; Original B-side: "Fast Phyllis"; Later B-side: "Meet Me On The Fourth Floor"	26	48	38	—	School Punks
1974	"Kings Of The Party" b/w "Ostrich"	31	31	39	—	School Punks
1974	"Mama Don't Allow No Parkin'" b/w "I Got It Bad For You"	74	—	77	—	School Punks
1977	"Lady (Put The Light On Me)" b/w "Rockers N' Rollers"	44	46	50	—	Brownsville Station
1977	"The Martian Boogie" b/w "Mr. Johnson Sez"	45	59	52	—	Brownsville Station
1979	"Love Stealer" b/w "Fever"	—	—	—	—	Air Special
