= Too Young to Fall in Love =

Single by Mötley Crüe

from the album Shout at the Devil
- B-side: "Take Me to the Top"
- Released: June 1984 (US)
- Recorded: 1983
- Genre: Heavy metal; glam metal
- Length: 3:34
- Label: Elektra
- Songwriter: Nikki Sixx
- Producer: Tom Werman

Mötley Crüe singles chronology
"Looks That Kill" (1984)	"Too Young to Fall in Love" (1984)	"Smokin' in the Boys Room" (1985)

Music videos
- "Too Young to Fall in Love" on YouTube

"Too Young to Fall in Love" is a 1984 single by American rock band Mötley Crüe. It was originally released on their 1983 album Shout at the Devil.

== Background ==
Written by bass guitarist Nikki Sixx, "Too Young to Fall in Love" was released as a single in 1984 and reached No. 90 on the Billboard Hot 100 and #26 on the Mainstream Rock tracks.

The tune later appeared in the 2002 video game Grand Theft Auto: Vice City on the fictional in-game radio station "V-Rock".

Even though the song was a hit, it has been left off some of Mötley Crüe's compilation albums such as Decade of Decadence and Greatest Hits, though it would be included on the reissue of the latter.

== Music video ==
An accompanying music video was released with the single.

The video concerns the members of the band coming together to rescue a young Asian woman from the clutches of the local Crime Boss. Interspersed with footage of the band performing the song, the video also contains a fight scene where the band members fight the Guards of the Crime Boss. It is then revealed that the young woman has willingly submitted to being a consort to the Crime Boss prompting the band members to leave while shaking their heads in disbelief and disgust.

As they leave, Tommy Lee tries to sample some of the Asian cuisine, where Vince told him not to after they tried to rescue the Asian woman, in the Crime Boss's kitchen. The Chief Guard attempts to kill Tommy but is knocked out using a heavy sack of grain. Tommy then picks up a bit of the food and begins to eat it. He then grimaces and spits the food out, walking from the kitchen in disgust.

== Critical reception ==
Upon the British release Barney Hoskyns of New Musical Express left an ironic review on November 17, 1984 and found few warm words for the band and their "not unraunchy" song.

Bryan Rolli, writing for Ultimate Classic Rock, wrote that the song “demonstrated Nikki Sixx’s penchant for sticky, earworm choruses."

== Track listing ==
1. "Too Young to Fall in Love"
2. "Take Me to the Top"

== Personnel ==
- Vince Neil - vocals
- Mick Mars - guitar
- Nikki Sixx - bass
- Tommy Lee - drums

== Charts ==
Chart (1984)	Peak position
US Billboard Hot 100	90
US Mainstream Rock (Billboard)	17
