= Mötley Crüe =

American heavy metal band

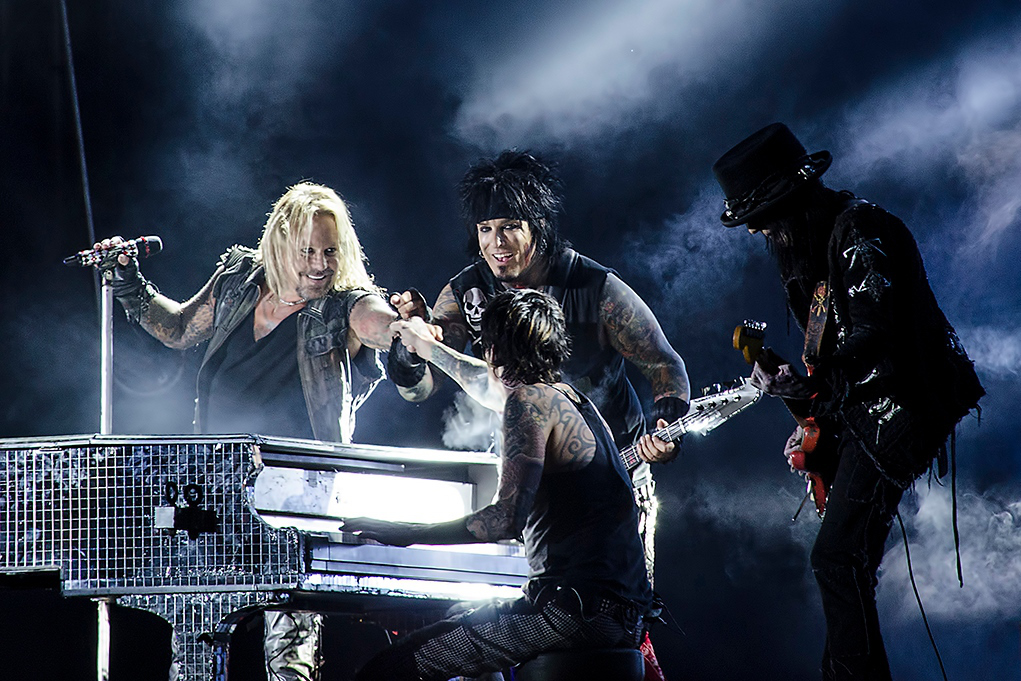
- Mötley Crüe performing at Sweden Rock Festival in 2012, from left to right: Vince Neil, Nikki Sixx, Tommy Lee (at piano), Mick Mars

Background information
- Origin: Hollywood, California, U.S.
- Genres: Heavy metal; glam metal; hard rock
- Works: Discography
- Years active: 1981–2002; 2004–2015; 2018–present
- Labels: Mötley; Beyond; Eleven Seven Music; Elektra; Leathür; Warner Music Group; Big Machine
- Spinoffs: Sixx:A.M.; Methods of Mayhem; Brides of Destruction; 58
- Spinoff of: London
- Members: Nikki Sixx; Tommy Lee; Vince Neil; John 5
- Past members: Greg Leon; Mick Mars; Michael White; John Corabi; Randy Castillo
- Website: motley.com

Mötley Crüe (pronounced "motley crew") is an American heavy metal band formed in Hollywood, California, in 1981 by bassist Nikki Sixx and drummer Tommy Lee, with guitarist Mick Mars and lead vocalist Vince Neil joining right after. The band has sold over 100 million records worldwide. They have achieved seven platinum or multi-platinum certifications, nine Top 10 albums on the Billboard 200 chart (including 1989's Dr. Feelgood, which is Mötley Crüe's only studio album to reach number one), twenty-two Top 40 mainstream rock hits, and six Top 20 pop singles.

The members of Mötley Crüe are often noted for their hedonistic lifestyles and the wild, sometimes androgynous style they maintained. Following the hard rock and heavy metal origins on the band's first two albums, Too Fast for Love (1981) and Shout at the Devil (1983), the release of its third album Theatre of Pain (1985) saw Mötley Crüe joining the first wave of glam metal. The band employ elaborate live performances, which include flame thrower guitars, roller coaster drum kits, and the use of pyrotechnics such as fireworks and lighting Sixx on fire. Mötley Crüe's most recent studio album, Saints of Los Angeles, was released on June 24, 2008. What was planned to be the band's final show took place on New Year's Eve, December 31, 2015. The concert was filmed for a theatrical and Blu-ray release in 2016.

After 2½ years of inactivity, Neil announced in September 2018 that Mötley Crüe had reunited and was working on new material. On March 22, 2019, the band released four new songs on the soundtrack for its Netflix biopic The Dirt, based on the band's New York Times best-selling autobiography of the same name. The soundtrack went to number one on the iTunes All Genres Album Chart, number three on the Billboard Top Album and Digital Album sales charts, number ten on the Billboard 200, and Top 10 worldwide. The autobiography returned to the New York Times Best Seller list at number six on Nonfiction Print and number eight on Nonfiction Combined Print & E-Book. Mötley Crüe embarked on its first major tour in seven years during the summer and fall of 2022, co-headlining a North American tour with Def Leppard.

The band has experienced several lineup changes over the years, leaving Sixx as the only consistent member; these included the introduction of lead vocalist John Corabi (who was Neil's replacement from 1992 to 1996) and drummer Randy Castillo, who filled in for Lee following his departure from Mötley Crüe in 1999; the latter rejoined the band in 2004. In October 2022, after 41 years of service, Mars announced his retirement from touring with the band, with John 5 (formerly of David Lee Roth, Marilyn Manson and Rob Zombie) replacing him.

== History ==
=== 1981–1983: Early history and Too Fast for Love ===
The nucleus of the group first came together in early 1981, when former Suite 19 guitarist/lead vocalist, and one-time member of Quiet Riot and Dokken, Greg Leon and drummer Tommy Lee decided to form a new band. They attended the farewell gig of a popular local band called London, and Lee was already impressed by the image and stage presence of their bassist, Nikki Sixx. Even before meeting Sixx, Lee claims he had posters of London on his bedroom walls. "Tommy just loved how Nikki looked", recalled Leon. "He was gung-ho about him, saying, 'This is the guy we should get'." Sixx auditioned twice but Leon felt he was "awful", telling Lee "He looks great. He's great on stage. But he can't play bass at all."

Lee subsequently became friends with Sixx and went to his Hollywood home to listen to new material he was working on. The music had been rejected by his London bandmates for being too heavy, and Lee says he immediately began banging on the table in time with the music and "everything just seemed to mesh". Lee subsequently hired Sixx for the new band, prompting guitarist/vocalist Leon to quit in protest. "I never played a show with Nikki Sixx. Tommy and I played together many times, but I was gone as soon as Nikki entered the picture. But they couldn't find a guitar player or singer initially, so they kept calling me. But I refused," Leon has said of his time in the band. Sixx and Lee began a search for new members and soon met guitarists Robin Moore (Jeff Gill) and Bob Deal, better known as Mick Mars, after answering an advertisement that he placed in The Recycler that read: "Loud, rude and aggressive guitar player available". Mars auditioned for Sixx, Moore and Lee, and was subsequently hired while Moore was fired at the same session according to the band's biography The Dirt.

Although a lead vocalist named O'Dean Peterson was auditioned, Lee had known Vince Neil from their high school days at Charter Oak High School in Covina, California, and the two had performed in different bands on the garage band circuit. Upon seeing him perform with the band Rock Candy at the Starwood in Hollywood, California, Lee suggested they have Neil join the band. At first Neil refused the offer. On the same day as Mars, lead vocalist Michael White, who previously played with Nikki Sixx in London, joined the band. But White eventually ended up leaving. As the other members of Rock Candy started to think about moving in more of a New Wave direction and became involved in outside projects, Vince Neil grew anxious to try something else. Lee asked again; Neil was hired on April 1, 1981, and the band played its first gig at the Starwood nightclub on April 24.

I wanted a band that would be like David Bowie and the Sex Pistols thrown in a blender with Black Sabbath.

— Nikki Sixx

The newly formed band did not yet have a name. Neil has said that he told his bandmates that he was "thinking about calling the band Christmas". The other members were not very receptive to that idea. Then, while trying to find a suitable name, Mars remembered an incident that occurred when he was playing with a band called White Horse, when one of the other band members called the group "a motley looking crew". He had remembered the phrase and later copied it down as "Mottley Cru". After slight modification of the spelling, "Mötley Crüe" was eventually selected as the band's name, with the stylistic decision suggested by Neil to add the two sets of metal umlauts, supposedly inspired by the German beer Löwenbräu, which the members were drinking at the time.

The band soon met its first manager, Allan Coffman, the thirty-eight-year-old brother-in-law of a friend of Mars's driver. The band's first release was the single "Stick to Your Guns/Toast of the Town", which was released on its own record label, Leathür Records, which had a pressing and distribution deal with Greenworld Distribution in Torrance, California. On November 10, 1981, its debut album Too Fast for Love was self-produced and released on Leathür, selling 20,000 copies. Coffman's assistant Eric Greif set up a tour of Canada, while Coffman and Greif used Mötley Crüe's success in the Los Angeles club scene to negotiate with several record labels, eventually signing a recording contract with Elektra Records in early 1982. The debut album was then remixed by producer Roy Thomas Baker and re-released on August 20, 1982—two months after its Canadian Warner Music Group release using the original Leathür mixes—to coincide with the tour.

Listening to Queen inspired Mötley Crüe to work with Roy Thomas Baker on Too Fast for Love. He would come in, "Hello Darlings..." and listen for maybe thirty minutes or so and leave. And we're like, "What?! Where's he going?". But he produced Queen, so, man, we had to have him produce us, too.

— Tommy Lee

In September 2023, Ratt frontman Stephen Pearcy told AXS TV that only a small number of bands had "really kickstarted things" on the Sunset Strip, naming Roxx Regime (later Stryper), Dante Fox (later Great White), W.A.S.P., Quiet Riot, Mötley Crüe, and Ratt as the core group.

During the "Crüesing Through Canada Tour '82", there were several widely publicized incidents. First, the band was arrested and then released at Edmonton International Airport for wearing their spiked stage wardrobe (considered "dangerous weapons") through customs, and for Neil arriving with a small carry-on filled with porn magazines (considered "indecent material"); both were staged PR stunts. Customs eventually had the confiscated items destroyed. Second, while playing Scandals Disco in Edmonton, a spurious "bomb threat" against the band made the front page of the Edmonton Journal on June 9, 1982; Lee and assistant band manager Greif were interviewed by police as a result. This too ended up being a staged PR stunt perpetrated by Greif. Lastly, Lee threw a television set from an upper story window of the Sheraton Caravan Hotel. Canadian rock magazine Music Express noted that the band was "banned for life" from the city. Despite the tour ending prematurely in financial disaster, it was the basis for the band's first international press.

In 1983, the band changed management from Coffman to Doug Thaler and Doc McGhee. McGhee is best known for managing Bon Jovi and later Kiss, starting with their reunion tour in 1996. Greif subsequently sued all parties in a Los Angeles Superior Court action that dragged on for several years, and coincidentally later resurfaced as manager of Sixx's former band, London. Coffman himself was sued by several investors to whom he had sold "stock in the band", including Michigan-based Bill Larson. Coffman eventually declared bankruptcy, as he had mortgaged his home at least three times to cover band expenses.

=== 1983–1991: International fame and addiction struggles ===
In January 1983, Swedish teen music and pop culture magazine Okej described Mötley Crüe as "a mix of Van Halen, Cheap Trick, Kiss, New York Dolls and Judas Priest — who knows, maybe that's exactly the right combination," characterising the band as "the new American supergroup from Los Angeles" who "can best be described as the kind of friend your mother warned you about hanging around with." The band became better known in the United States after playing at the US Festival on May 29, 1983. Their second album, Shout at the Devil, was released on September 26, 1983. The album represented the band's mainstream breakthrough in America and would eventually be certified 4× platinum. The album was mentioned by an ABC news reporter in a piece on conservative Christian groups complaining about modern Satanism. They gained the attention of Ozzy Osbourne, and became a support act on his 1984 tour for Bark at the Moon. The band members were developing a reputation for their backstage antics, outrageous clothing, extreme high-heeled boots, heavily applied make-up, and seemingly endless abuse of alcohol and drugs. In December 1984, Neil crashed his De Tomaso Pantera, killing his passenger, then-Hanoi Rocks drummer Nicholas "Razzle" Dingley. Neil, charged with a DUI and vehicular manslaughter, was sentenced to 30 days in jail (although he served only 18 days) and subsequently was sued for $2,500,000. The short jail term was negotiated by his lawyers, enabling Neil to tour and pay the civil suit.

The band's third album, Theatre of Pain, was released on June 21, 1985, and dedicated in Dingley's honor, and it started a new glam metal phase in the band's style. Theatre of Pain was commercially successful, reaching number 6 on the Billboard album charts and eventually being certified quadruple platinum. However, the recording of the album was fraught with tension in the wake of Neil's accident and Sixx's growing addiction, and members of the band have said that they consider it a creative disappointment. Mötley Crüe spent most of the next year on a world tour in support of Theatre of Pain. In February 1986, while in London, England, Sixx suffered a near-fatal heroin overdose, and the person who sold him the drugs dumped his unconscious body in a dumpster. The incident inspired Sixx to write the song "Dancing on Glass" for their next album.

The band's fourth album, Girls, Girls, Girls, was released on May 15, 1987, and debuted at number 2 on the Billboard 200. Sixx has said in interviews that he believes the album would have debuted at number 1, if not for behind the scenes maneuvering by Whitney Houston's record label. The band again changed their look for the album and subsequent tour, trading the glam elements of the previous album for a biker aesthetic. The band faced many of the same personal issues that plagued the recording of Theatre of Pain and Sixx has complained that those issues compromised the album's quality, although he has spoken more positively about the record in subsequent years.

On December 23, 1987, Sixx suffered a heroin overdose. He was declared clinically dead on the way to the hospital, but the paramedic, who was a Mötley Crüe fan, revived Sixx with two shots of adrenaline. His two minutes in death were the inspiration for the song "Kickstart My Heart", which peaked at No. 16 on the Mainstream U.S. chart, and which was featured on 1989's Dr. Feelgood, their first U.S. number one album. From 1986 to 1987, Sixx kept a daily diary of his heroin addiction and eventually entered rehab in January 1988, prompting the band to cancel their planned tour dates for that year. While 1988 was the first year that Mötley Crüe did not tour, controversy again hit the band that year in the form of a lawsuit by Matthew Trippe. Trippe claimed that Sixx was hospitalized in 1983 after a car crash involving drugs and that he had been hired as Sixx's doppelgänger. The suit was regarding the loss of royalties from his time in Mötley Crüe and the case was not closed until 1993 when Trippe dropped his charges and disappeared from public view. Their decadent lifestyles almost shattered the band until managers Thaler and McGhee pulled an intervention and refused to allow the band to tour in Europe, fearing that "some [of them] would come back in bodybags". Shortly after, all the band members jointly entered drug rehabilitation in an effort to move forward as a band.

After finding sobriety, Mötley Crüe reached its peak popularity with the release of their fifth album, the Bob Rock-produced Dr. Feelgood, on September 1, 1989. Rock and the band recorded the album in Vancouver, with the band members recording their parts separately for the first time to reduce infighting and to focus on individual performance. Aerosmith lead singer Steven Tyler, who was recording their Pump album at the same studio, provided backing vocals. On October 14 of that year, it became a No. 1 album and stayed on the charts for 114 weeks after its release. The band members each stated in interviews that, due in no small part to their collective push for sobriety, Dr. Feelgood was their most solid album musically to that point. The title track and "Kickstart My Heart" were both nominated for Grammys in the Best Hard Rock category in 1990 and 1991, respectively, but lost both years to songs by Living Colour. The band did find some success at the American Music Awards, as Dr. Feelgood was nominated twice for Favorite Hard Rock/Metal Award, losing once to Guns N' Roses' Appetite for Destruction, but winning the following year, beating out Aerosmith's Pump and Poison's Flesh & Blood. Mötley Crüe was nominated twice for Favorite Hard Rock/Metal Artist.

In 1989, McGhee was fired after the band alleged he had broken several promises that he made in relation to the Moscow Music Peace Festival, including giving his other band, Bon Jovi, advantages in terms of slot placement. Thaler then assumed the role of sole band manager. Mötley Crüe spent the fall of 1989 and most of 1990 on a massive world tour, the band's biggest to that point. It was a major financial success but left the band feeling burnt out. In April 1990, Lee suffered a concussion during a mishap involving a rappelling drum kit stunt during a live concert in New Haven, Connecticut. On October 1, 1991, the band's first compilation album, Decade of Decadence 81–91, was released. It peaked at No. 2 on the Billboard 200 album chart. It was reportedly designed as "just something for the fans" while the band worked on the next "all new" album.

=== 1992–2003: Years of turmoil ===
Neil left the band in February 1992 following the release of Decade of Decadence, during a period in which most other prominent glam metal bands of the 1980s were breaking up or otherwise seeing their popularity decline significantly amid the advent of grunge and alternative music. It remains unclear whether Neil was fired or had quit the band. Sixx has long maintained that Neil quit, while Neil insists that he was fired. "Any band has its little spats," Neil observed in 2000, "and this one basically just stemmed from a bunch of 'fuck yous' in a rehearsal studio. It went from 'I quit' to 'You're fired' ... It was handled idiotically. The management just let one of the biggest bands in the world break up."

In the running for the vacant frontman position was Kik Tracee vocalist Stephen Shareaux. Ultimately Neil was replaced by John Corabi (formerly of Angora and the Scream). Although Mötley's self-titled March 1994 release made the Billboard top ten (No. 7), the album was a commercial failure. It prompted negative reactions from many fans due to Neil's absence and its sound. Corabi suggested the band bring back Neil, believing the latter would always be seen as the voice of the band. This eventually resulted in his own firing in 1996. Corabi spoke about his time with the band and his thoughts on the first record with Mötley Crüe. Corabi said: "My record was the first record that they had done that didn't go platinum, didn't make some sort of crazy noise, and everybody panicked". During his time away from the band, Neil released a moderately successful solo album, Exposed in 1993, and a less commercially successful follow-up, Carved in Stone in 1995.

After Rolling Stone magazine broke out the news in their November 26, 1996 issue, the band reunited with Neil in 1997, after their current manager, Allen Kovac, and Neil's manager, Bert Stein, set up a meeting between Neil, Lee, and Sixx. Agreeing to "leave their egos at the door", the band released Generation Swine. Although it debuted at No. 4, and in spite of a live performance at the American Music Awards, the album was a commercial failure, due in part to lack of support from their label. In 1998, Mötley Crüe's contractual ties with Elektra had expired, putting the band in total control of their future, including the ownership of the master recordings of all of their albums. Announcing the end of their relationship with Elektra, the band became one of the few groups to own and control their publishing and music catalog. They are one of only a handful of artists to own the masters to their material and reportedly did so by being the biggest pain they could be until Elektra got fed up and handed over the rights in order to get the band off their label. After leaving Elektra the band created their own label, Mötley Records.

Mötley Crüe released their compilation Greatest Hits in late 1998, featuring two new songs, "Bitter Pill" and "Enslaved". In 1999, the band rereleased all their albums, dubbed as "Crücial Crüe". These limited-edition digital remasters included demos, plus live, instrumental, and previously unreleased tracks. In 1999 the band released Supersonic and Demonic Relics, an updated version of Decade of Decadence featuring the original songs from that album and several previously unreleased B-sides and remixes, as well as their first official live album Entertainment or Death (which was the original working title for the studio album Theatre of Pain). The band then went on a co-headlining tour with the Scorpions.

In 1999, Lee quit to pursue a solo career, due to increasing tensions with Neil. "All we got was a call from his attorney saying he wasn't coming back," recalled the singer. "He wasn't into rock 'n' roll anymore. He even said that rock is dead ... It all happened during a void in Mötley. We weren't even rehearsing, so it was no big deal." Lee was replaced by a longtime friend of the band, former Ozzy Osbourne drummer Randy Castillo. The band released New Tattoo in July 2000. Before the ensuing tour commenced, Castillo became ill with a duodenal ulcer. The band brought in former Hole drummer Samantha Maloney for the Maximum Rock tour with Megadeth as Castillo concentrated on his health. However, while Castillo was recovering from stomach surgery, he was diagnosed with squamous cell carcinoma after finding a tumor on his jaw. He died on March 26, 2002. Soon afterward, the band went on hiatus.

While the band was on hiatus, Sixx played in side projects 58 and Brides of Destruction. Neil was featured on the first season of VH1's reality show The Surreal Life, and had his own special titled "Remaking Vince Neil", which focused on his solo career and attempts to get in better physical shape. Mars, who suffers from a hereditary form of arthritis which causes extensive spinal pain called ankylosing spondylitis, went into seclusion in 2001 dealing with health issues. Lee went on to form Methods of Mayhem, while performing as a solo artist at the same time.

A 2001 autobiography titled The Dirt, co-authored by all four of the band members and Neil Strauss, presented Mötley Crüe as "the world's most notorious rock band". The book made the top ten on The New York Times Best Seller list and spent ten weeks there, and would return to the list after the film adaptation was released in spring 2019. In 2003, the band released two box sets entitled Music to Crash Your Car To: Vol. 1 and Vol. 2, featuring the music from their entire career. The titles of the collections were heavily criticized by Hanoi Rocks singer Michael Monroe, among others, due to their possible reference to Neil and Razzle's fatal automobile accident, and that Neil was found guilty of manslaughter for the incident.

=== 2004–2007: Reunion and renewed success ===
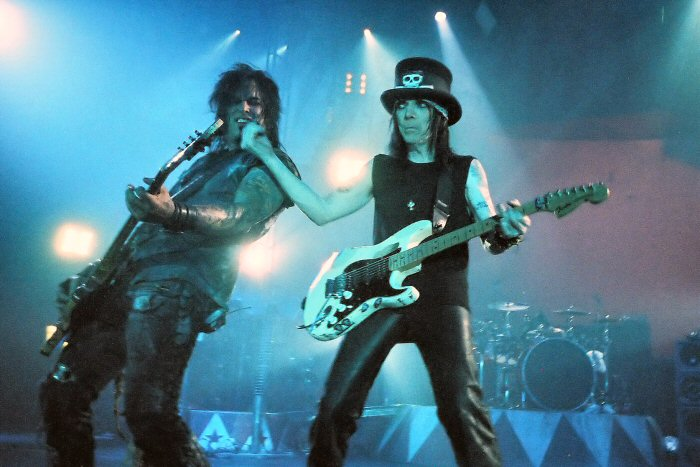
Nikki Sixx and Mick Mars performing onstage with Mötley Crüe, on June 14, 2005, in Glasgow, Scotland

A promoter in England, Mags Revell, began clamoring for a Mötley Crüe reunion, ostensibly presenting himself as the voice of anxious fans waiting for more from the band. After meeting with management several times, in September 2004, Sixx announced that he and Neil had returned to the studio and had begun recording new material. In December 2004, the four original members announced a reunion tour, staging an announcement event in which they arrived at the Hollywood Palladium in a hearse. The tour began on February 14, 2005, in San Juan, Puerto Rico. The resulting compilation album, Red, White & Crüe, was released in February 2005. It features the band members' favorite original songs plus three new tracks, "If I Die Tomorrow", "Sick Love Song" (co-written by Sixx and James Michael), and a cover of the Rolling Stones' "Street Fighting Man". A small controversy was caused when it was suggested that neither Lee nor Mars played on the new tracks (duties were supposedly handled by Vandals drummer Josh Freese). However, a VH1 documentary of the band's reunion later showed that Lee did indeed play on some of the tracks. The Japanese release of Red, White & Crüe includes an extra new track titled "I'm a Liar (and That's the Truth)". Red, White & Crüe charted at No. 6 and has since gone platinum.

On New Year's Eve 2004 the band appeared on a live episode of The Tonight Show. Neil yelled an obscenity during the performance, leading to an FCC investigation. The NBC network responded by banning the band, leading to the band subsequently suing the network, claiming they were being unfairly punished. The lawsuit was eventually settled out of court and the band made several subsequent appearances on the network.

In 2005, Mötley Crüe was involved in an animation-comedy spoof Disaster!, which was written by Paul Benson and Matt Sullivan and which was used as the introduction film to concerts on their Carnival of Sins tour. That tour continued throughout 2005 and was commemorated with the release of a live album and DVD in 2006. In the fall of 2005 the band re-recorded "Home Sweet Home" as a duet with Linkin Park lead singer Chester Bennington and donated the proceeds to the victims of Hurricane Katrina.

In 2006, Mötley Crüe went on the Route of All Evil Tour, co-headlining with Aerosmith and taking performers from Lucent Dossier Experience on the road with them. Paramount Pictures and MTV Films planned to adapt their autobiography, The Dirt, into a movie, but the production was delayed for several years and the deal eventually fell through. In June 2007, Mötley Crüe set out on a small European tour. A lawsuit was filed by Neil, Mars and Sixx against Carl Stubner, Lee's manager. The three sued him for contracting for Lee to appear on two unsuccessful reality shows the band claim hurt its image. It was later reported on Motley.com that the lawsuit had been settled.

In 2007, Sixx published his diaries as the bestselling autobiography The Heroin Diaries: A Year in the Life of a Shattered Rock Star, covering the band's Girls, Girls, Girls world tour and his 1987 overdose, and Sixx's side project band Sixx:A.M. released The Heroin Diaries Soundtrack as a musical parallel to the novel.

=== 2008–2010: Saints of Los Angeles ===
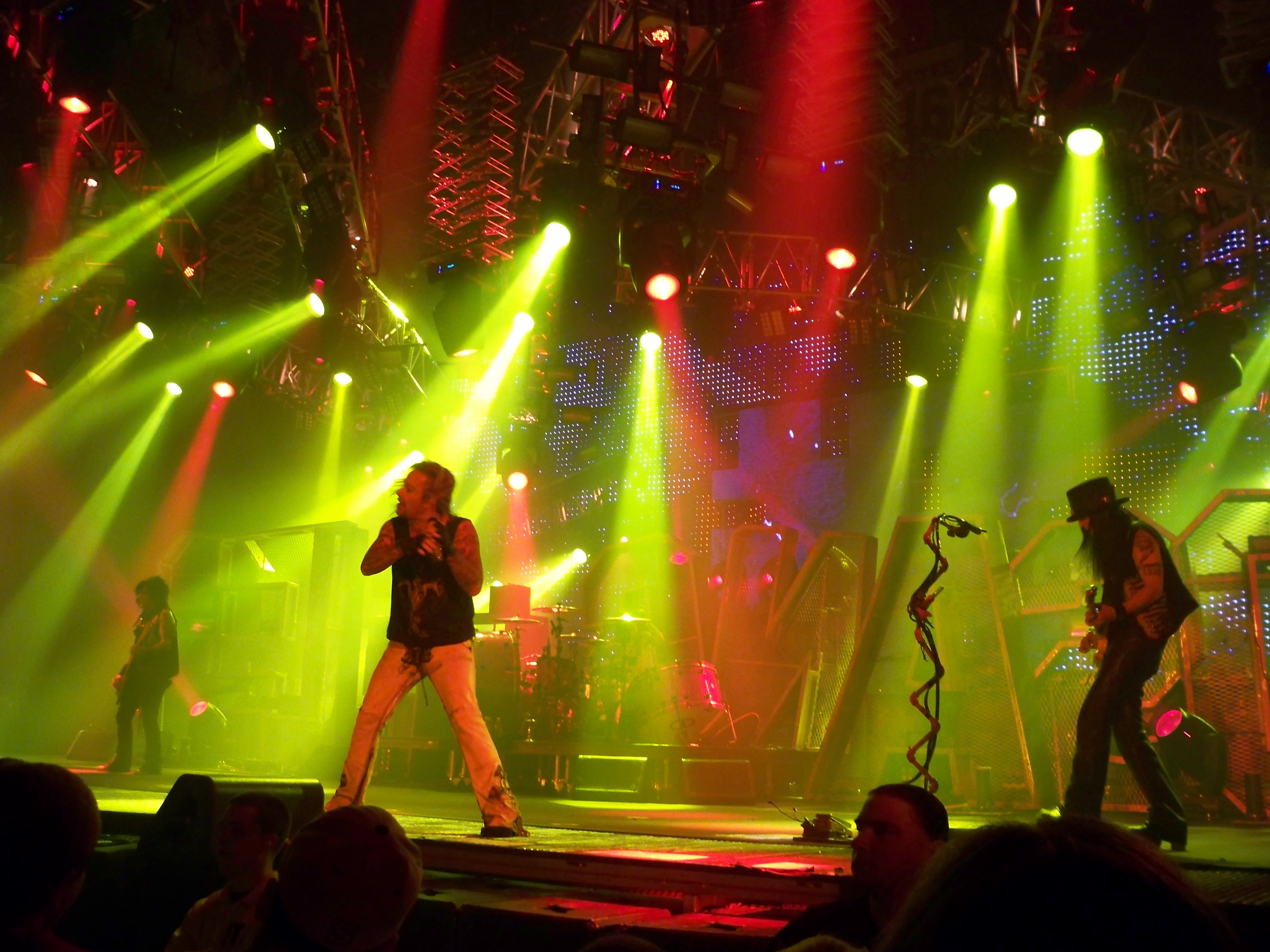
Mötley Crüe performs in Erie, Pennsylvania on March 7, 2009

Vince Neil (not the band) hosted the Motley Cruise from January 24 to 28 in 2008; this featured Ratt, Skid Row and Slaughter. On June 11, 2008, Mötley Crüe and manager Burt Stein filed suit against each other. Stein was Neil's personal manager and, according to the band and rival manager Kovac, served as the band's manager at one time. The band and Kovac sued in Los Angeles County Superior Court, claiming Stein was not entitled to a cut of Mötley Crüe's earnings. Stein sued the same day in Nashville's federal court, saying he was entitled to 1.875 percent of what the band makes. Other litigation between the parties arose in Nevada. In July 2009, lawyers for both sides announced that the disputes had been "amicably resolved" through a "global settlement".

Mötley Crüe's ninth studio album, titled Saints of Los Angeles, was released in Japan on June 17, 2008, and in America on June 24, 2008. The album was originally titled The Dirt, as it was loosely based on the band's autobiography of the same name, but the title was later changed. In the US, the album was released by Eleven Seven Music. Eleven Seven took over US distribution of their back catalog. iTunes picked "Saints of Los Angeles" in their "Best of 2008" in the Rock category as the number one song. The song was nominated for a Grammy Award in the "Best Hard Rock Performance" category, but lost to "Wax Simulacra" by The Mars Volta. The song was released in the music game series Rock Band as downloadable content the day the single was released. It was briefly sold as a Rock Band exclusive, making Mötley Crüe the first band to release a single exclusively through a video game. The song sold more units via Rock Band than it did via traditional streaming sites. Additionally, the entire Dr. Feelgood album was released as downloadable content in Rock Band, excluding "T.n.T. (Terror 'n Tinseltown)".

From July 1 to August 31, 2008, Mötley Crüe headlined the popular Crüe Fest music festival, which included opening acts Buckcherry, Papa Roach, Trapt, and Sixx:A.M. They then spent the fall and winter of that year on tour with Hinder, Theory of a Deadman and The Last Vegas. The band made a guest appearance in the fourth season finale of the FOX crime dramedy Bones on May 14, 2009, entitled "The End in the Beginning", performing the song "Dr. Feelgood". The following month they performed at the Download Festival at the Donington Park motorsports circuit (June 12–14, 2009), playing on the second stage on Friday night. Mötley Crüe headlined the Crüe Fest 2 festival, which ran from July to September 2009. Supporting them were Godsmack, Theory of a Deadman, Drowning Pool, and Charm City Devils. The band's set celebrated the 20th anniversary of Dr. Feelgood by performing the album in its entirety on each night of the tour. They re-released the album as a special 20th anniversary deluxe edition. Mötley Crüe headlined Ozzfest in 2010, along with Ozzy Osbourne and Rob Halford. Neil released his third solo album and autobiography, both entitled Tattoos and Tequila.

=== 2011–2015: The Final Tour and retirement from touring ===
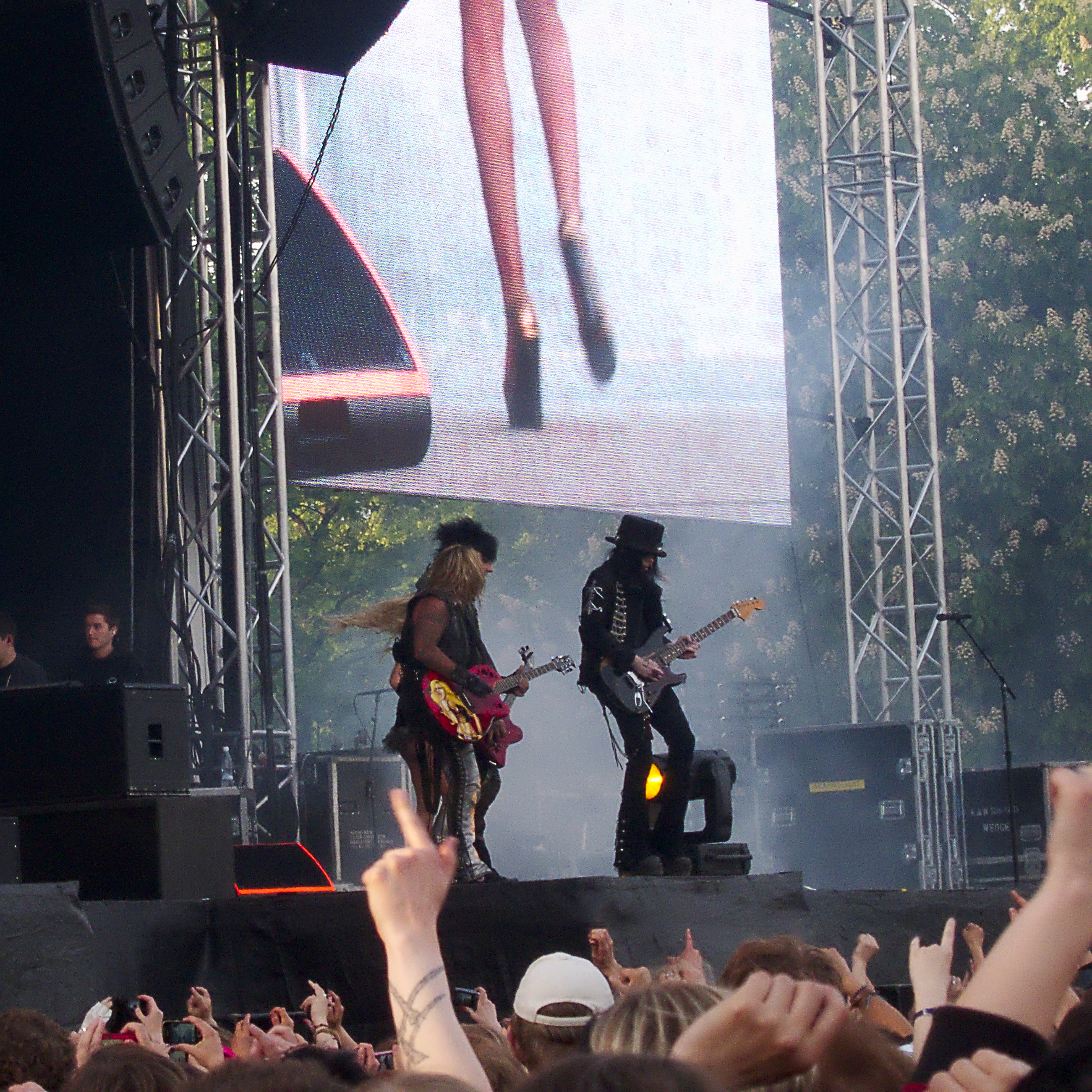
Mötley Crüe performs at Kaisaniemi Park in Helsinki, Finland in June 2012

Mötley Crüe co-headlined a mid-year tour with Poison and special guests New York Dolls in 2011 for the band's 30th Anniversary and Poison's 25th anniversary. On August 30, 2011, Mötley Crüe, along with co-headliners Def Leppard and special guests Steel Panther, announced a UK Tour commencing in December 2011. In February 2012 the band appeared along with supermodel Adriana Lima in a commercial for the Kia Optima, which premiered during Super Bowl XLVI. In the same month the band hosted its first residency at the Hard Rock Hotel and Casino in Las Vegas. In March 2012, Mötley Crüe announced a co-headlining tour with Kiss. The tour kicked off July 20 in Bristow, Virginia, and ran through September 23. In the spring and summer of 2013 the band toured throughout Canada with Big Wreck. The band returned to Las Vegas for a second residency in the fall of 2013.

On January 28, 2014, at the conference inside Beacher's Madhouse Theater in Hollywood, Mötley Crüe announced the full details of its retirement, including a tour initially spanning 70 North American dates, with Alice Cooper playing as a special guest. The tour commenced in Grand Rapids, Michigan, on July 2, 2014. The band members had signed a "cessation of touring agreement", which prevented them from touring under the Mötley Crüe name beyond the end of 2015. In a later interview, Sixx talked about the possibility of releasing new music, saying that "We have music written, [but] it's not put together yet". He speculated that the band would release it in a song-by-song format as opposed to a full-length album format, elaborating with "It's hard, to be honest with you, to spend six [or] nine months to write eleven songs—all those lyrics ... everything ... the vocals, the guitars, the bass, the sonics, the mixing, the mastering, the artwork. ... You put it out and nothing [happens], because now people cherry-pick songs. So we go, 'Why don't we write songs and find vehicles to get one, two or four songs to ten million people rather than eleven songs to a hundred thousand people."

During the tour the band played a new song, "All Bad Things", over the speakers throughout the venue before it took the stage. On November 22, 2014, in Spokane, Washington, at the Spokane Arena, Mötley Crüe played the final concert of the first North American leg of The Final Tour. On January 15, 2015, it was announced that the band's career would end with international concerts in Japan, Australia, Brazil and Europe before heading out for a second leg of North American concerts throughout 2015, ending with a concert at the MGM Grand Garden Arena in Las Vegas on December 27, followed by three concerts at Staples Center on December 28, 30 and 31, 2015. In May 2015, The Crüe and Alice Cooper announced a set of 12 concert dates for Europe at a conference in London. On September 19, 2015, the band played the Rock in Rio festival on the main stage. Mötley Crüe performed, for what was then advertised to be the last time, at Staples Center in Los Angeles on December 31, 2015. The band reported that its New Year's Eve show was going to be released as a film in 2016; the movie was titled Mötley Crüe: The End.

=== 2018–2022: Reunion, The Dirt film and return to touring ===
In 2017, frontman Vince Neil told host Sammy Hagar on the show Rock and Roll Road Trip that Mötley Crüe were "completely done". However, on September 13, 2018, Neil announced via Twitter that Mötley Crüe was recording four new songs; this was later confirmed by bassist Nikki Sixx, who said that the new material was recorded for the film adaptation of the band's biography, The Dirt. Neil clarified that, though the band has signed a contract to no longer tour, they still plan to continue putting out new music for the future.

Netflix released The Dirt biopic based on the book of the same name that coincided with an 18-song soundtrack on March 22, 2019. The film is directed by Jeff Tremaine (Jackass), produced by Julie Yorn and Erik Olsen, executive produced by Rick Yorn, and co-produced by Kovac, who is Mötley Crüe's manager, CEO of Eleven Seven Label Group and founder of Tenth Street Entertainment. The Dirt stars Daniel Webber as Neil, Iwan Rheon (Game of Thrones) as Mars, Douglas Booth as Sixx and Colson Baker (a.k.a. Machine Gun Kelly) as Lee. Also starring in the movie is Pete Davidson (Saturday Night Live) as record executive Tom Zutaut. Rolling Stone wrote that The Dirt is "a truly debauched movie that delves deep into their rise from the early Eighties Sunset Strip metal scene to their days as arena headliners." The film portrays many of the adventures the band went on including touring with Ozzy Osbourne and the Theatre of Pain tour.

The first new song from the soundtrack was "The Dirt (Est.1981)", which was released on February 22, 2019. The band wrote two other new songs, "Ride With the Devil" and "Crash and Burn", and covered Madonna's "Like a Virgin", on the album. The soundtrack additionally included fourteen previously released Mötley Crüe songs. It was produced by Bob Rock, who produced Dr. Feelgood, and was released on March 22, 2019, on Mötley Records and Eleven Seven Music. The soundtrack hit the Billboard Top 10 at No. 10, the first time Mötley Crüe hit the Billboard Top 10 in over a decade.

The group's legacy was featured on a 2019 episode of the Reelz documentary series Breaking the Band. Both Neil and Sixx had a negative reaction to how things were portrayed in the episode. Sixx said they would be pursuing legal action and called Reelz "the bottom of the barrel".

In November 2019, rumors started to circulate of the band reuniting for a 2020 tour with Def Leppard and Poison, following the success of Guns N' Roses' reunion tour. The band responded to an online petition rallying for the group's return, saying "this is interesting...". On November 18, Rolling Stone magazine reported that all four band members had agreed to come back together for the tour, utilizing a loophole in their "Cessation of Touring" contract. Later that same day, the band confirmed all reports with a statement on their website, posting a press release and a video of the contract being destroyed.

On December 4, 2019, it was officially confirmed that Mötley Crüe would embark on The Stadium Tour with Def Leppard, Poison and Joan Jett & the Blackhearts in the summer of 2020. Also in December 2019 Mick Mars announced that his debut solo album would be released in the spring of 2020. On June 1, 2020, Mötley Crüe announced that The Stadium Tour would be rescheduled to June–September 2021 due to the COVID-19 pandemic; it was postponed once again to 2022, due to similar circumstances amid the pandemic. In January 2022, in the wake of the Omicron variant surge, Sixx was asked by a fan on Twitter if The Stadium Tour was still happening this year; his response was, "We're 1000% hitting the road with Def Leppard for The Stadium Tour in mid-June...I can't f'ckin wait..." Mötley Crüe later joined Def Leppard again for another tour together in Europe in 2023.

In November 2021, Mötley Crüe sold their entire back catalogue to BMG Rights Management. In September 2022, Neil announced in an interview with the Las Vegas Review-Journal that the band would return for a US tour in 2023. In that same interview, he ruled out the possibility of further studio albums, stating that they were "strictly a touring band".

=== 2022–present: Retirement of Mick Mars and Cancelled ===
On October 26, 2022, Mick Mars retired as a touring member of the band due to ongoing health issues, according to a statement released by Mars' publicist. The next day, the band confirmed that John 5 would take Mars' place as their new touring guitarist, although he was later confirmed as a permanent member of the band in April 2023. In a December interview with A Radio Rock in Brazil, Sixx confirmed that the band was not going away anytime soon, and stated that the band would be touring for "at least eight more years". On April 6, 2023, Mars sued the band, alleging that they were trying to remove him. In response to the lawsuit, the band issued a statement on the same day, denying that they had fired Mars, and that while he was still a member, had quit touring.

On April 19, 2023, the band announced that they were working on new music with record producer Bob Rock, ruling out the possibility of the band working with Mars again. Sixx later released a statement on a then-upcoming album on May 15, 2023, stating that it had finished production and the band had begun mixing the album. In June 2023, Neil confirmed that they were set to perform another stadium tour in 2024. In the following month, he confirmed that the band recorded three brand new songs. In September 2023, John 5 confirmed the title of a new song as "Dogs of War", and that the band recorded a cover of "(You Gotta) Fight for Your Right (To Party!)" by the Beastie Boys.

On April 23, 2024, it was announced that Mötley Crüe had signed a deal with Big Machine Records, and three days later the band released "Dogs of War", their first song in five years and their first with John 5. Neil told Billboard that same month that additional music from Mötley Crüe could be released by the end of 2024 or in 2025, though the new material would likely result in "a few songs here, a few songs there" rather than a full-length album. Lee did not rule out releasing a new Mötley Crüe album, but stated that "recording and writing some stuff that you're feeling right at the moment and releasing it is, for us, a lot more fun and sort of a time stamp of where we're at right now." Sixx said that the band had recorded two other new singles that were ready to be released. A new EP, titled Cancelled, was released on October 4, 2024.

In 2025, Dolly Parton recorded a new version of the band's 1985 single "Home Sweet Home" with Mötley Crüe, marking the song's 40th anniversary. The track was released on the band's compilation From The Beginning, with a portion of proceeds benefiting Covenant House, a charity supporting homeless youth. The collaboration returned a favor Parton had extended two years earlier, when she invited Mötley Crüe's Nikki Sixx and John 5 to contribute to her 2023 rock album Rockstar.

On May 12, 2026, Mötley Crüe performed truncated versions of "Home Sweet Home" and "Kickstart My Heart" with 2005 American Idol winner Carrie Underwood on the show's finale. Five months later, the band celebrated a major milestone as their 1989 song "Kickstart My Heart", from the album Dr. Feelgood, reached one billion streams on the streaming service Spotify.

== Feuds ==
=== Metallica ===
Despite being on the same label together (Elektra Records) during the 1980s and 1990s, Mötley Crüe and Metallica frequently criticized each other throughout their careers. Both singer and guitarist James Hetfield and drummer Lars Ulrich expressed their hatred of the heavy metal scene in Los Angeles at the time and frequently attacked multiple up-and-coming local bands, including Mötley Crüe. Ulrich claimed that before a show in 1982, he drunkenly screamed "Fuck Mötley Crüe!" from outside the Troubadour in Hollywood, with Sixx chasing Ulrich in retaliation. During a 1983 interview, original Metallica lead guitarist Dave Mustaine referred to their style of glam as an abbreviation for "Gay LA Music". However, Metallica were impressed by the production and commercial success of Dr. Feelgood in 1989, hiring the album's producer Bob Rock to produce their self-titled fifth album in 1991. Ulrich accused Mötley Crüe of performing to a backing track at the 1997 American Music Awards. Sixx responded via an online forum, attacking Metallica's then-recent album Load and insulting members of the band for their change in sound and image. During a 2003 interview, Sixx would defend Metallica's then-latest album St. Anger by claiming "I have learned to have sympathy for the enemy". In 2006, both Tommy Lee and former Metallica bassist Jason Newsted took part in a reality show entitled Rock Star: Supernova, where they formed a supergroup and tried to find a frontman via contest. During a 2011 meet-and-greet in Mexico City, Hetfield was approached by a fan attacking Mötley Crüe due to their public image and frequent appearances in tabloids. Hetfield refused to directly respond to the fan's comments towards Mötley Crüe but did find humor in his insults toward the band. In 2015, Lee posted a Tweet featuring a picture of Ulrich with the words "Straight Outta Tempo" superimposed over his face, referencing the N.W.A biopic Straight Outta Compton. Following the post by Lee, Vince Neil had stated online that he was unaware of the feud with Metallica; however, during a later interview with an Oregon radio show, Neil was again asked about the band's current relationship with Metallica and hung up on the show's host. In 2017, Hetfield appeared on Sixx's radio show Sixx Sense. During an interview in 2021, Sixx applauded Metallica's longevity and praised several of their releases.

=== Guns N' Roses ===
Though Guns N' Roses were initially hired to open for Mötley Crüe during the summer of 1987, things grew hostile in 1988 after Vince Neil and Riki Rachtman alleged that then-Guns N' Roses guitarist Izzy Stradlin had assaulted Neil's then-wife Sharise at Rachtman's Cathouse club. Things came to a breaking point at the 1989 MTV Video Music Awards following Mötley Crüe's presentation of the award for "Best Metal Video" to Guns N' Roses; however, only bassist Duff McKagan and drummer Steven Adler appeared at the stage to accept it. Following their performance with Tom Petty, Neil rushed the side of the stage and threw a punch at Stradlin before being restrained by security. Guns N' Roses frontman Axl Rose was enraged with the incident, threatening Neil after security had separated the two. During an interview in August 1990, Rose later challenged Neil to a fight during an interview with Kurt Loder, claiming "Anytime he wants it, Atlantic City, I don't care. We'll put money on it." Neil responded in early 1991 by challenging Rose to a fight: "Axl if you are watching this, I want to challenge you to a fight. I'm gonna give you time and I'm gonna give you the place. There's no backing out now buddy. It's time to put up or shut up.", later expressing his intent to possibly host the fight in an arena. Reportedly, Eddie Van Halen and then-current Van Halen singer Sammy Hagar had offered money to host the fight at Madison Square Garden in New York City, but neither Rose nor Neil responded. Neil claims Stradlin had called him with an apology for the incident, but the 1991 Guns N' Roses track "Shotgun Blues" was allegedly a diss track aimed at Neil. Tensions were reported to have died down shortly afterwards when both Tommy Lee and former Guns N' Roses guitarist Gilby Clarke participated with former Metallica bassist Jason Newsted in Rockstar: Supernova, as they would contribute musical parts in the show's contest to find a vocalist of the newly formed supergroup. Things remained cordial until 2009 when Neil had lobbed insults towards Rose in response to Guns N' Roses' most recent album, Chinese Democracy, calling the record a flop and criticizing Rose for his management of the band at the time. In 2014, Revolver magazine honored Rose by calling him "The World's Greatest Singer"; in response, Neil mocked the award on Twitter, but deleted his response shortly afterward.

=== Godsmack ===
Alternative metal band Godsmack feuded with Mötley Crüe when Godsmack was hired as one of the supporting acts for the 2009 Crüe Fest 2 tour. Godsmack frontman Sully Erna and drummer Shannon Larkin claimed the feud originated from Mötley Crüe's treatment of the support bands on tour, particularly Godsmack's fans who allegedly often left venues early following their own performance. Larkin recalled in a 2011 interview with Loudwire: "Mötley Crüe's security were real weird with our guests getting backstage, like our guests might want to look at Mötley Crüe. Our guests were there to see us and they didn't care a shit about Mötley Crüe. Mötley Crüe is a legendary band that we all respect. When I was 17, I had 'Shout at the Devil' but it just kind of fronted us a little that they would think that our guests would be star-struck over them. So, that's where the bad blood came from." Erna allegedly penned the 2010 track "Cryin' Like a Bitch" about Sixx's behavior towards Godsmack during the tour, though Shannon Larkin claims the song was written about former San Diego Chargers quarterback Philip Rivers. Due to the claim of a diss track aimed at him, Sixx insulted Godsmack and alleged that they had asked to appear on his radio show multiple times. During a 2015 appearance on The Jasta Show (hosted by Hatebreed frontman Jamey Jasta), Erna called Sixx an "old, fat, washed-up has-been" and challenged Sixx to a fight, claiming: "I'll say it straight out: I've never met a bigger fucking dick in my life than Nikki Sixx. He's a douchebag. He's straight-up a fucking douche, and I don't give a fuck what he says. He knows exactly where I am, and he knows exactly how he can find me anytime that motherfucker has the balls to come and look me up". Sixx responded to Erna's comments on a Facebook livestream, calling him a "baby". Sixx would claim the band would refuse any future festival dates if they were booked on the same bill as Godsmack.

=== Steel Panther ===
Comedic glam metal band Steel Panther engaged in a feud with Mötley Crüe following a tour between the two bands and Def Leppard in 2011. Numerous members of Steel Panther claim they were heavily influenced by Mötley Crüe's music; however, touring with the band exhibited a hostile environment, particularly from Nikki Sixx and Tommy Lee. In the years following the tour, guitarist Satchel claimed Tommy Lee had been rather hostile towards multiple band members due to allegations that he and singer Michael Starr had sex with Lee's girlfriend at the time. Starr commented on Mötley Crüe's feud with Godsmack, claiming Sully Erna would severely beat Sixx in a fistfight. In a 2015 interview, Starr would claim the members of Mötley Crüe take themselves too seriously given the comedic nature of Steel Panther's music. Sixx would respond in 2016, claiming he prioritized taking his musical contributions much more seriously. During a 2018 interview, Satchel claimed "There are bands that hate our guts... We did a tour a few years ago with Def Leppard and Mötley Crüe". Things escalated in 2019 when drummer Stix Zadinia and Starr appeared in a video on the channel Little Punk People where the two were asked which dead musicians they could revive; Starr jokingly claimed he wanted to bring back Vince Neil from the 1980s, enraging Sixx, who later attacked Starr on Twitter for his comment. Shortly following the response from Sixx, Steel Panther's band account replied with an interview Mötley Crüe gave from 1994 (whilst Neil was not a part of the band), in which Sixx and guitarist Mick Mars mocked and joked at Neil's weight following a jet ski accident. Though Mötley Crüe would not respond to the post, multiple band members of Steel Panther have praised Mötley Crüe's music as influential in multiple interviews afterwards.

=== Former Mötley Crüe members ===
==== Mick Mars ====
On October 27, 2022, co-founding guitarist Mick Mars publicly announced his retirement from touring with the band after 41 years due to complications with ankylosing spondylitis, a degenerative form of inflammatory arthritis leaving him unable to perform on tour. Shortly afterwards, the band announced longtime Rob Zombie guitarist John 5 would be his replacement during the ongoing tour. In an interview with Ultimate Guitar dated March 13, 2023, Carmine Appice, a friend of Mars', claimed that Mars had also lost enjoyment for touring. Enraged with the comments, Nikki Sixx responded on Twitter, attacking Appice as "a washed up drummer." Following Sixx's comments, Mars began to attack the band during an interview with Variety published April 6, 2023, claiming the band's severance payout was "laughable" as his royalties had allegedly been cut to 7.5% as a result of his retirement. Mars further claimed he was forced to retire as opposed to being fired by the band based on their own displeasure with his medical ailments.

On April 7, 2023, Mars publicly filed a lawsuit against Mötley Crüe in the Los Angeles County Superior Court for unpaid royalties, claiming the band had severely cut his touring royalty agreement from 25% to 5% as a direct result of his retirement. The band's representative Sasha Frid had revealed claims that a 2008 legal agreement signed by all four band members had documented that no resigning participants would receive the same compensation attributable to live performances or merchandise sales if a particular member had chosen to quit the band. Mars' attorney Ed McPherson publicly attacked the band in a statement due to their failure to reveal updated financial documents in regards to Mars' payout agreement following his retirement in October. According to Mars' accounts in the lawsuit, the band had forced him to sell off his remaining share in the band, labeling their behavior as "bullying". Nikki Sixx would make a public statement on Twitter expressing his disappointment with the lawsuit but offered his public support for Mars nonetheless. Mars would further attack the band in a Variety article, taking aim at Lee and Neil for their previous legal incidents and alleged the band had been performing with a backing track throughout the tour.

During an interview with Rolling Stone on July 3, 2023, Mars elaborated further by claiming he has refused to speak with any members of the band ever again, stating his intention to pursue his full royalty percentage. By September 2023, the matter remained in litigation.

In January 2026, Mötley Crüe won their legal battle against Mars, with Mars admitting under oath his claims that the band fired him, that they tried to reduce his stake from 25% to 5% in Mötley Crüe Inc., and the accusations of the band performing to backing tracks were all false. In addition, he was forced to pay back $750,000 in touring advances, and was dismissed as a manager, agent and co-owner of Mötley Crüe Inc.

==== John Corabi ====
Following the firing of Vince Neil in 1992, Mötley Crüe hired John Corabi as their new lead singer prior to the recording of their 1994 self-titled album. Fan reactions were mixed due to the uncharted nature of the band's change in sound with Corabi, in addition to their new stylistic direction. As the band began writing for their upcoming seventh album, Generation Swine, tensions over the album's creative direction began to surface between the band and Corabi. Corabi blamed much of the poor songwriting and production on Nikki Sixx's leadership, while Sixx blamed Corabi for being unable to write songs fluidly. The band had previously hired new manager Allen Kovac in 1994 prior to the release of the self-titled album; however, the mixed response to the record, in addition to backlash towards Corabi from longtime fans, proved to be strenuous on the band's public image, resulting in the band firing Corabi during the recording of Generation Swine. The band were forced by management and fan responses to rehire Neil, however; tensions with Corabi remained high for multiple years following the split. Corabi would later sue the band in 1997 due to removal of his songwriting credits on the album. Despite the tensions, Corabi took part in a short-lived supergroup with Sixx entitled Brides of Destruction with L.A. Guns guitarist Tracii Guns in 2003. Corabi later outlined that his tensions with Sixx would resurface during the project, attacking Sixx during multiple public interviews for his poor leadership and playing abilities. Following guitarist Mick Mars' lawsuit against the band in 2023, Corabi expressed his support for Mars while criticizing the band's poor financial decisions.

== Musical style and legacy ==
Mötley Crüe's musical style is most commonly described as heavy metal, glam metal, and hard rock. According to AllMusic, the band has "a knack for melding pop hooks to heavy metal theatrics". They are among the first bands to be labeled "hair metal," according to music website Loudwire. The band's early sound drew influence from glam rock, blues rock and early punk rock. The website stated that the band developed their sound by "twist[ing] those influences into something louder, sleazier and more dangerous." The band's image during this time was described as "flamboyant", and incorporated styles and accessories such as backcombed hair and slim-fit pants. The band later explored alternative metal and grunge sounds on Mötley Crüe (1994) and industrial rock on Generation Swine (1997). As RockLists.com put it, "The reputation came as a package: hedonism on an industrial scale, a wild look that flirted with androgyny, and stage shows with flame-throwing guitars, a drum kit that rode like a roller coaster and Sixx himself set on fire."

Music critic Martin Popoff's book The Top 500 Heavy Metal Songs of All Time lists seven of the band's songs in its ranking. Mötley Crüe was ranked tenth on MTV's list of Top 10 Heavy Metal Bands of All-Time and ninth on VH1's All Time Top Ten Metal Bands. Loudwire named the band the 22nd greatest metal band of all time. Spin named Shout at the Devil the 11th best metal album of all time. In 2013, LA Weekly named the band the third best hair metal band of all time. Rolling Stone named Too Fast For Love the 22nd best metal album of all time.

In 2006, the band received a star on the Hollywood Walk of Fame.

In 2014, the tribute album Nashville Outlaws was released, featuring country music stars including Rascal Flatts, LeAnn Rimes and Darius Rucker covering various Mötley Crüe songs. The album debuted at number 2 on the Billboard Country Album chart and number 5 on the Billboard 200.

In 2016, the staff of Loudwire named them the 22nd-best metal band of all time. In 2020, Jeff Mezydlo of Yardbarker included them in his list of "the 20 greatest hair metal bands of all time", placing them fourth.

In 2025, Ultimate Classic Rock said Mötley Crüe was among the "Big Four" of glam metal, along with Def Leppard, Bon Jovi and Poison. A year later, Loudwire stated the opinion that they were among the "Big Four" bands of '80s rock along with Van Halen, Def Leppard and Guns N' Roses, noting that their sound had been emulated by countless Los Angeles bands that followed them. The site wrote: "It's impossible to envision the '80s without teased hair and tight pants — and even harder to imagine the decade without Mötley Crüe."

== Band members ==
Current

- Nikki Sixx – bass, keyboards, backing vocals (1981–2002, 2004–2015, 2018–present)
- Tommy Lee – drums, percussion, piano, backing vocals (1981–1999, 2004–2015, 2018–present)
- Vince Neil – lead vocals, occasional rhythm guitar (1981–1992, 1996–2002, 2004–2015, 2018–present)
- John 5 – guitar, backing vocals (2023–present; touring 2022–2023)

Former

- Greg Leon – lead vocals, guitar (1981)
- Mick Mars – guitar, backing vocals, bass (1981–2002, 2004–2015, 2018–2022; not touring 2022–2023)
- Michael White – lead vocals (1981)
- John Corabi – lead vocals, guitar, bass, piano (1992–1996)
- Randy Castillo – drums (1999–2000; died 2002)

Touring

- Emi Canyn – backing vocals (1987–1991; died 2017)
- Donna McDaniel – backing vocals (1987–1991)
- Jozie DiMaria – dancer (1999, 2005–2006)
- Pearl Aday – backing vocals (2000)
- Samantha Maloney – drums (2000–2002)
- Will Hunt – drums (2006, 2007, 2008; substitute for Tommy Lee)
- Morgan Rose – drums (2009; substitute for Tommy Lee)
- Allison Kyler – backing vocals, dancer (2011–2015)
- Annalisia Simone – backing vocals, dancer (2011)
- Sofia Toufa – backing vocals, dancer (2012–2015)
- Glen Sobel – drums (2015; substitute for Tommy Lee)
- Hannah Sutton – backing vocals, dancer (2022–2024)
- Laura D'Anzieri – backing vocals, dancer (2022)
- Bailey Swift – backing vocals, dancer (2022)
- Tommy Clufetos – drums (2022; substitute for Tommy Lee)
- Ariana Rosado – backing vocals, dancer (2023–2024)

== Discography ==
Studio albums

- Too Fast for Love (1981)
- Shout at the Devil (1983)
- Theatre of Pain (1985)
- Girls, Girls, Girls (1987)
- Dr. Feelgood (1989)
- Mötley Crüe (1994)
- Generation Swine (1997)
- New Tattoo (2000)
- Saints of Los Angeles (2008)

== Tours and residencies ==
=== Concert tours ===
- Anywhere, USA Tour (1981)
- Boys in Action Tour (1981–1982)
- Crüesing Through Canada Tour (1982)
- Shout at the Devil Tour (1983–1984)
- Welcome to the Theatre of Pain Tour (1985–1986)
- Girls, Girls, Girls Tour (1987)
- Dr. Feelgood World Tour (1989–1990)
- Monsters of Rock Tour (1991)
- Anywhere There's Electricity Tour (1994)
- Live Swine Listening Party Tour (1997)
- Mötley Crüe vs. The Earth Tour (1997)
- Greatest Hits Tour (1998–1999)
- Maximum Rock Tour (1999)
- Welcome to the Freekshow Tour (1999)
- Maximum Rock 2000 Tour (2000)
- New Tattoo Tour (2000)
- Red, White & Crüe ... Better Live Than Dead Tour (2005)
- Carnival of Sins Tour (2005–2006)
- Mötley Crüe Tour (2007)
- Crüe Fest Tour (2008)
- Saints of Los Angeles Tour (2008–2009)
- Crüe Fest 2 Tour (2009)
- The Dead of Winter Tour (2010)
- Ozzfest Tour (2010)
- Glam-A-Geddon Tour (2011)
- Mötley Crüe 30th Anniversary Tour (2011)
- Mötley Crüe England Tour (2011)
- European Tour (2012)
- The Tour (2012)
- North American Tour (2013)
- The Final Tour (2014–2015)
- The Stadium Tour (2022)
- The World Tour (2023)
- The Return of the Carnival of Sins (2026)

=== Concert residencies ===
- Mötley Crüe Takes on Sin City (2012)
- An Intimate Evening in Hell (2013)
- The Las Vegas Residency (2025)
- Carnival of Sins in Sin City (2027)
