= Sex matters =

Sex matters, short for sexual matters (sometimes stylized as Sex Matters) refers to subjects or topics related to human sexual activity and human sexuality.

Sex matters may also refer to:

- Sex Matters: From Sex to Superconsciousness, a book published based on a 1968 lecture series by Indian "Sex Guru" Osho
- Sex Matters: When opposites attract, a 1996 book by Steve Chalke and Nick Page on sex and relationships
- Sex Matters (EP), a 2002 album by the band Kissed Out
- Sex Matters (TV series), a 2010 Canadian TV show exploring human sexuality
- Sex Matters for Women: A complete guide to taking care of your sexual self, a 2011 book on sexual health by Sallie Foley
- Sex Matters (advocacy group), a British advocacy group, founded in 2021, opposing transgender rights
- Sex Matters: Essays in Gender-Critical Philosophy, a 2023 book by Holly Lawford-Smith

== See also ==
- Sexual and Reproductive Health Matters (SRHM), a scientific journal supporting sexual and reproductive health rights
- Sexuality (disambiguation)
- Sex (disambiguation)
