= S3X =

S3X may refer to:

- s3X, Internet slang for sex
- S3X, a concept car that lead to the Chevrolet Captiva
- Synare S3X, electronic drum equipment
- Sturmey-Archer S3X, a cycle gear hub
- "S3X", a 2009 TV episode of Brothers & Sisters season 3
- S3X, the Tesla model range scheme, an Easter eggs in Tesla products

== See also ==
- Sex (disambiguation)
