= Sex =

Sex most commonly refers to:

- Biological sex, the trait of certain reproducing organisms producing either male or female gametes
  - Sexual reproduction, reproduction that combines multiple gametes
- Human sexual activity, a broad range of reproductive or erotic human practices
  - Human sexuality, the way people express themselves in terms of, or experience, the above activities
  - Sexual intercourse, the activity of using reproductive organs penetratively
- Animal sexual behaviour, the reproductive or erotic activities of non-human animals
  - Copulation (zoology), in which a male introduces sperm to a female's body
- Legal sex or legal gender, a legal status

Sex or sexual may also refer to:

== Arts and entertainment ==
=== Film and television ===
- Sex (1920 film), an American silent drama
- Sex (2024 film), a Norwegian drama
- Sex (TV series), an Australian series
- "Sex", a 1997 TV episode of Brass Eye
- "Sex", an episode of Kath & Kim, 2002
- Sex: The Annabel Chong Story, a 1999 documentary film

=== Literature ===
- Sex (book), by Madonna and Steven Meisel, 1992
- Sex (manga), a Japanese manga series by Atsushi Kamijo
- Sex (play), by Mae West, 1926
- Sexes, an MDPI academic journal

=== Music ===
==== Albums ====
- Sex (Elli Kokkinou album), 2005
- Sex (Telex album), 1981
- Sex (The Necks album), 1989
- Sex (Vintage album), 2009
- Sex (The 1975 EP), 2012
- Sex (Tila Tequila EP), 2007
- Sex, a segment of R.O.S.E. by Jessie J, 2018

==== Songs ====
- "Sex" (The 1975 song), 2012
- "Sex" (Cheat Codes and Kris Kross Amsterdam song), 2016
- "Sex" (Lenny Kravitz song), 2014
- "Sex" (Mötley Crüe song), 2012
- "Sex (I'm a ...)", by Berlin, 1983
- "S.E.X." (song), by Lyfe Jennings, 2006
- "Sexual" (song), by Neiked featuring Dyo, 2016
- "Sex", by Colette Carr, 2011
- "Sex", by Eden from I Think You Think Too Much of Me, 2016
- "SEX", by Frank Zappa from The Man from Utopia, 1983
- "Sex", by Oomph! from Sperm, 1994
- "Sex", by Rammstein from the untitled Rammstein album, 2019
- "S.E.X.", a bonus track by Madonna on Rebel Heart, 2015
- "S.E.X.", by Nickelback from Dark Horse, 2008
- "Sexual", by Die Toten Hosen from Love, Peace & Money, 1994
- "Sexual", by Nick Jonas from Spaceman, 2021
- "Sexual (Li Da Di)", by Amber from Amber, 1999

==== Other uses in music ====
- SEX, pseudonym of American rapper Young Thug

== Other uses ==
- Sex (boutique), in London
- SEX (computing), an assembly language mnemonic
- Seax, or sex, a knife used by ancient Germanic peoples
- Sextans, a constellation, abbreviated "Sex"
- Sodium ethyl xanthate, a chemical compound
- Sex-, the Latin prefix meaning 6
- Sex Peak, a mountain in Montana, US
- Sexing, the act of discerning the sex of an animal
- Sexual, or allosexual, someone with a typical experience of sexual attraction

== See also ==
- SEK (disambiguation)
- S3X (disambiguation)
- SX (disambiguation)
- Cex (disambiguation)
- Gender (disambiguation)
- Sexuality (disambiguation)
