= Tesla Model S =

Battery-electric full-size car

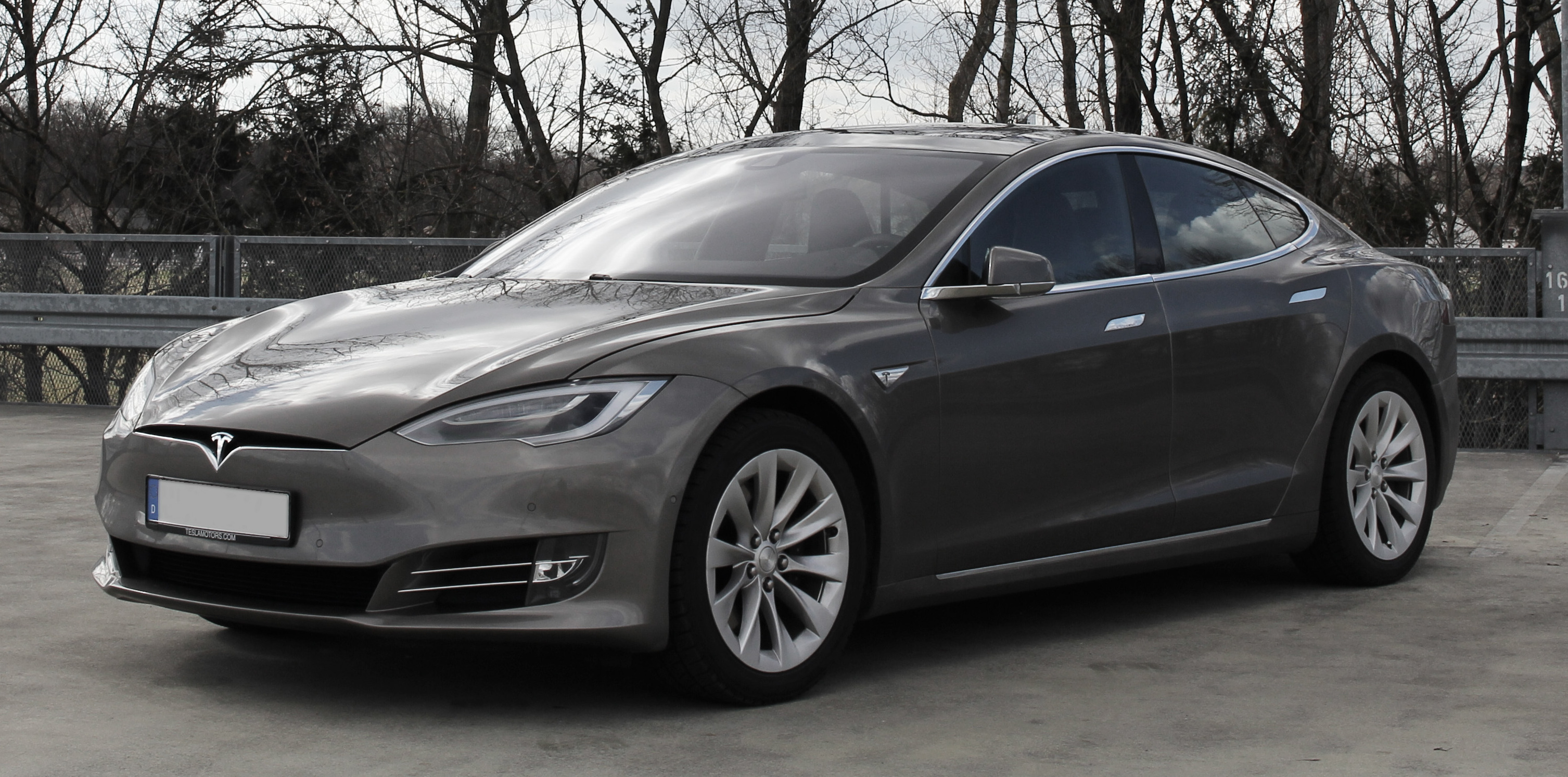
- 2016–2019 model

Overview
- Manufacturer: Tesla, Inc.
- Production: June 2012 – May 2026
- Model years: 2013–2026
- Assembly: United States: Fremont, California (Fremont factory); Netherlands: Tilburg (Tilburg factory, final assembly, 2013–2021)
- Designer: Franz von Holzhausen (2008); Peter Rawlinson (Chief Engineer)

Body and chassis
- Class: Full-size
- Body style: 4-door liftback sedan
- Layout: Rear-motor, rear-wheel drive; Dual-motor, all-wheel drive; Tri-motor, all-wheel-drive (Plaid)
- Chassis: Unibody
- Related: Tesla Model X

Powertrain
- Electric motor: Alternating current induction motor; Permanent magnet synchronous reluctance motor (rear motor for dual-motor models; 2019–2026)
- Transmission: Single-speed reduction gear
- Battery: 40–100 kWh lithium-ion battery
- Electric range: 208–405 mi (335–652 km)

Dimensions
- Wheelbase: 116.5 in (2,960 mm)
- Length: 196.1–197.7 in (4,980–5,021 mm)
- Width: 77.3 in (1,960 mm) (Note: Excluding side-view mirrors)
- Height: 56.5 in (1,440 mm)
- Curb weight: 4,323–4,960 lb (1,961–2,250 kg)

The Tesla Model S is a battery-electric, four-door full-size car that the American automaker Tesla produced from 2012 to 2026. The automaker's second vehicle, the Model S has been described as one of the most influential electric cars in the industry. Its various accolades include the Motor Trend Car of the Year award in 2013.

Tesla started developing the Model S around 2007 under the codename WhiteStar, with Henrik Fisker appointed as lead designer for the project. After a dispute with Elon Musk, Tesla's CEO, Fisker was replaced by Franz von Holzhausen who, by 2008, had designed the production Model S's exterior. Tesla unveiled a prototype of the vehicle in March 2009 in Hawthorne, California. In 2010, Tesla acquired a facility in Fremont, California, to produce the Model S, which was previously owned by General Motors and Toyota. Series manufacture of the car officially began at the Tesla Fremont Factory in June 2012. Tesla carried out the final assembly for European markets at its facilities in Tilburg, Netherlands, between 2013 and 2021.

Constructed mostly of aluminum, the Model S shares 30 percent of its components with the Model X—a crossover SUV that was introduced in 2015. The Model S underwent several updates during its production, the most prominent ones occurring in 2016 and 2021. These updates usually included modifications to the motor, such as changes to power or torque, revised exterior elements, and refreshed interior features. One such change included the 2015 introduction of Tesla Autopilot—a partial vehicle automation advanced driver-assistance system. The 2021 update led to the introduction of the high-performance, three-motor Plaid. Tesla ended production of the car in May 2026.

In 2015, the Model S was the world's best-selling plug-in electric vehicle. In 2012, it was included on Time's list of the Best Inventions of the Year, and the magazine later included it on its list of the 10 Best Gadgets of the 2010s in 2019. Car and Driver included it on its list of the best cars of the year in 2015 and 2016. In 2014, The Daily Telegraph described the Model S as a "car that changed the world". Road & Track argued that, with the introduction of the Plaid and features such as the yoke steering wheel, Tesla managed to turn the Model S into "perhaps one of the worst [cars in the world]".

== Development ==
In January 2007, the American automaker Tesla Motors opened a facility in Rochester Hills, Michigan, employing sixty people to work on new projects, including a four-door sedan. Beginning development under the codename WhiteStar, Tesla planned for the car to have two powertrain options. The first would be a battery-electric version with an all-electric range of 200 miles (320 km). The second was to be a hybrid electric vehicle with a range extender, capable of traveling between 40 and 50 miles (64 and 80 km) on electric power before a small gasoline engine would recharge its batteries and power the vehicle, giving it a total range of 400 miles (640 km). However, at the GoingGreen conference in September 2008, Elon Musk—the chief executive officer of Tesla—announced that the company would exclusively produce battery-electric vehicles.

In 2007, Musk appointed Henrik Fisker, known for his work with Aston Martin, as the lead designer of the WhiteStar project. Fisker signed a US$875,000 contract to design the car. The company requested that he design a "sleek, four-door sedan" priced from $50,000–$70,000 (equivalent to $77,636–$108,690 in 2025), and that it be ready between late 2009 and early 2010. Fisker owned a design studio in Orange County, California, which Tesla employees visited to view his designs. Their reactions were generally negative; Ron Lloyd, the vice president of the WhiteStar project, described the designs as "terrible [...] some of the early styles were like a giant egg". When Musk rejected his designs, Fisker attributed the decision to the project's physical constraints, saying, "they wouldn't let me make the car sexy". Shortly after the meetings, Fisker started his own eponymous company and debuted the Fisker Karma in 2008 at the North American International Auto Show. Musk filed a lawsuit against Fisker, accusing him of stealing Tesla's design ideas and using the $875,000 to launch his own company. Fisker won the lawsuit in November 2008, and an arbitrator declared Tesla's claims to be without merit and ordered Tesla to reimburse Fisker's legal fees.

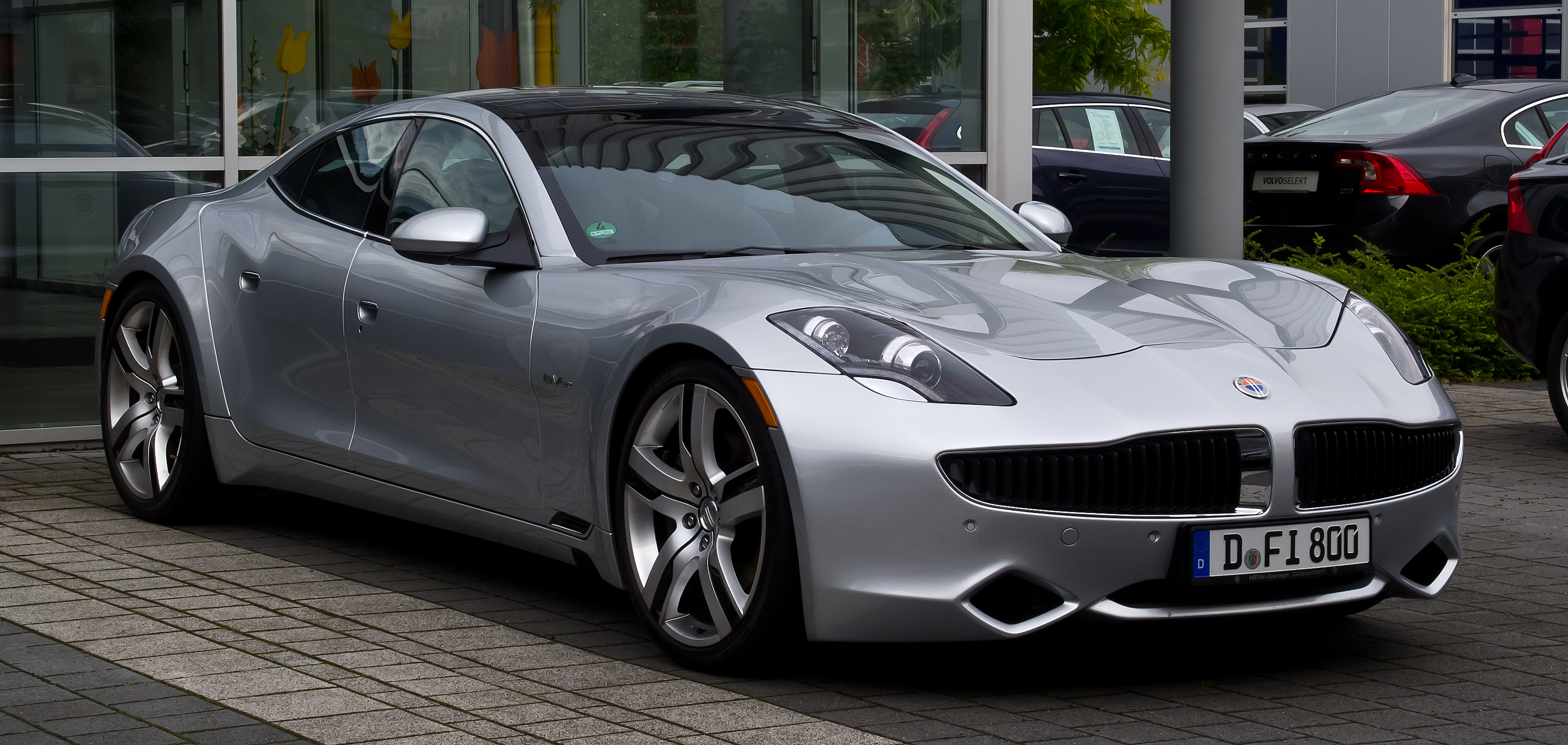
A dispute between Musk and Fisker arose after the latter started his own company and began producing the Karma (pictured).

A small team of Tesla engineers went to a Mercedes-Benz car dealership where they test-drove a CLS and an E-Class. Both cars shared a chassis, and the engineers assessed different aspects of the two vehicles, evaluating their positives and negatives. They ultimately preferred the CLS's styling and used it as the baseline for the Model S. After purchasing a CLS, they disassembled it, modified the battery pack of a Tesla Roadster, cut out the CLS's floor, and integrated it with the battery pack. They subsequently put all of its electronics and systems in the CLS's trunk and replaced the interior. After three months of development, the engineers completed a battery-electric version of the CLS. They frequently tested the car on public roads. It had 120 miles (190 km) of all-electric range per charge and weighed more than the Roadster.

In August 2008, Musk hired Franz von Holzhausen—who formerly designed for Mazda—as project WhiteStar's lead designer. Von Holzhausen reviewed Fisker's sketches and clay models but was unimpressed with what he saw, stating that "it was clear [...] that the people [who] had been working on this were novices". To save money, Tesla established its design center within a factory for SpaceX—a company also owned by Musk. As von Holzhausen began designing the exterior of the Model S, Tesla engineers initiated a project to construct another electric version of a CLS. They stripped it to its core, removed the body structure, and extended the wheelbase by four inches (10 cm) to align with early Model S specifications. Within three months, von Holzhausen had designed what would become the production Model S's exterior, and the engineers had begun building a prototype around the design. Given the battery pack's substantial weight, Musk and the team began efforts to minimize the weight of other components. To address this issue, Musk opted to use aluminum instead of steel, stating that the non-battery-pack portion of the vehicle must be lighter than equivalent gasoline vehicles. He noted that the primary challenge was that if aluminum were not used in its construction, the car's performance would be compromised. To accelerate the development of the Model S, one group of engineers worked during the day, while another arrived late evening and worked through the night, both operating within a 3,000 square feet (280 m^{2}) tent in the SpaceX factory.

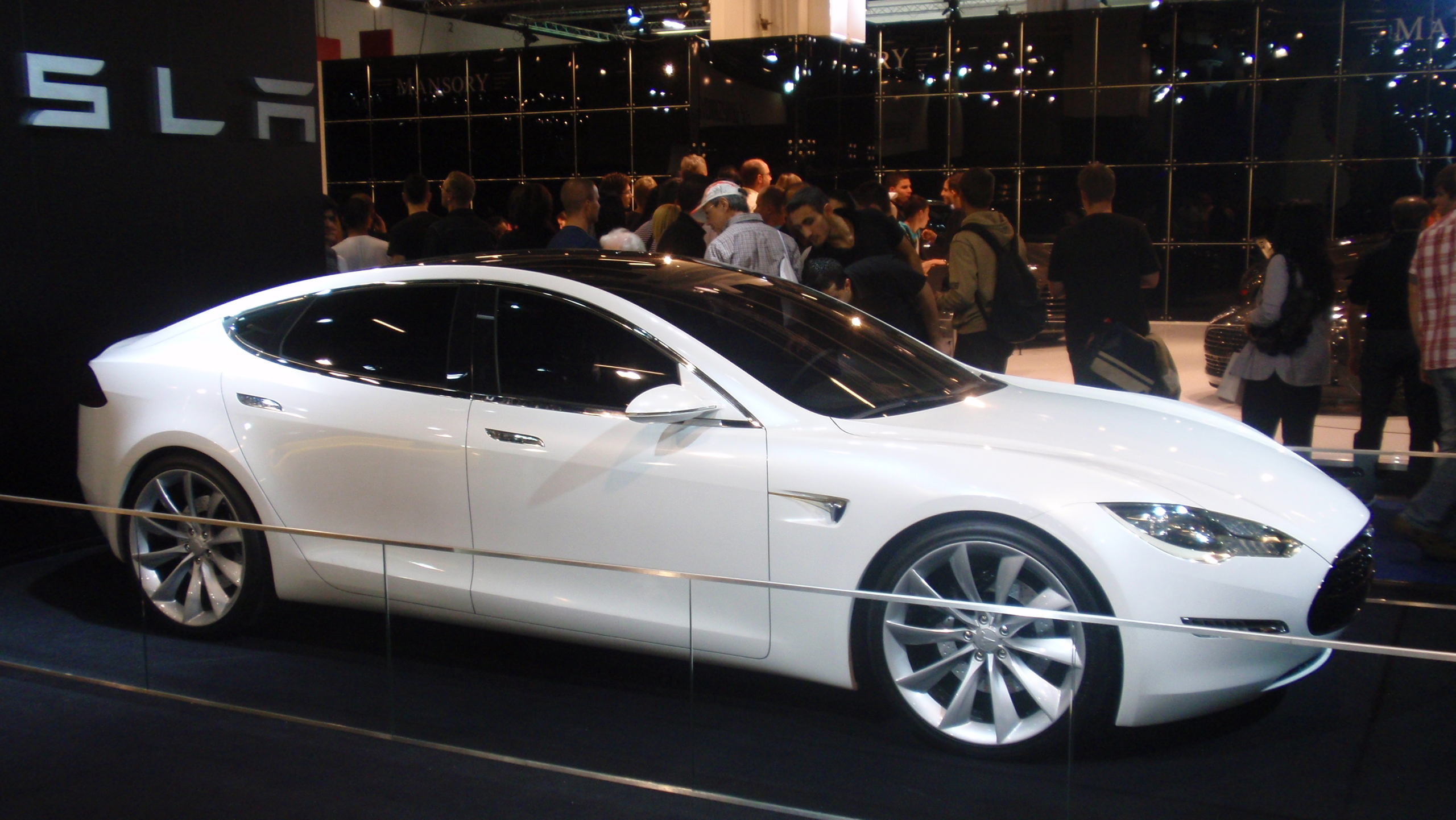
The Model S prototype at the 2009 Frankfurt Motor Show

Tesla debuted a prototype version of the Model S in Hawthorne, California, on March 26, 2009. In August 2009, J. B. Straubel stated that a battery pack with 300-mile (480 km) range would be available, a significant advance at the time. Tesla initially intended to manufacture the Model S in Albuquerque, New Mexico, and later in San Jose, California, but later withdrew from both plans mainly due to financial problems. During the Great Recession, American automaker General Motors decided to abandon the NUMMI facility in 2009, with Toyota soon following. A month after the last car was produced at the manufacturing line in April 2010, Toyota and Tesla announced a partnership and the transfer of the factory. Tesla agreed to purchase a significant portion of the facility for $42 million (equivalent $60 million in 2025), while Toyota invested $50 million (equivalent to $72 million in 2025) in Tesla for a 2.5 percent stake in the company.

During the early 2010s, Musk expanded the engineering teams for the Model S, while von Holzhausen grew the design teams in Los Angeles. The engineers operated in a lab with forty-five personnel. The pre-production version of the Model S, featuring newly stamped body parts from the Fremont factory, a revamped battery pack, and improved power electronics, was completed in the basement of an office in Palo Alto, California. Twelve of the cars were produced; some were sent to suppliers such as Bosch, while others were preserved for testing and design alterations. On June 22, 2012, Tesla invited its employees, select customers, and the press to see the first production Model S in Fremont.

== Design ==
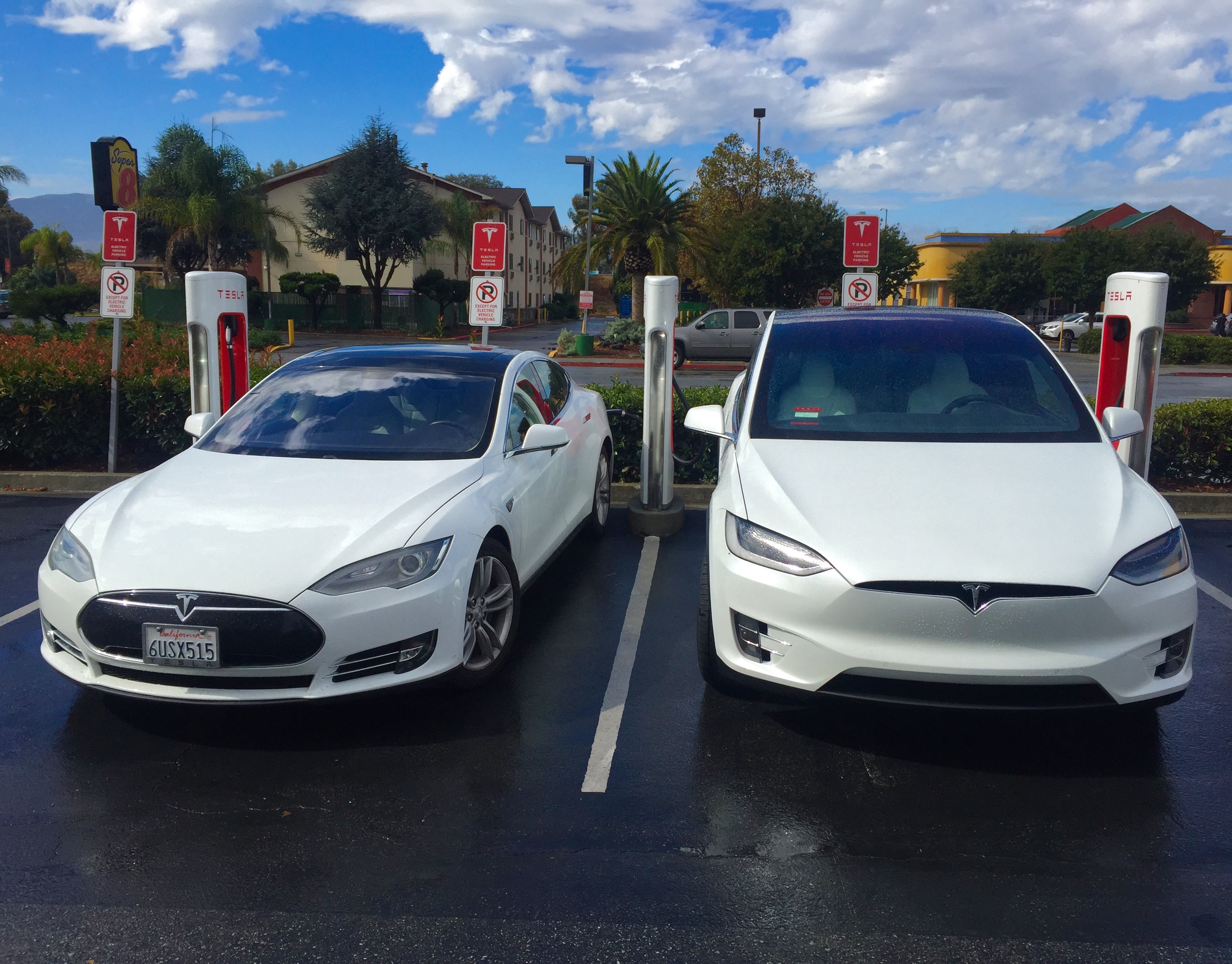
The Model S (left) and Model X (right) share a platform and 30 percent of their parts.

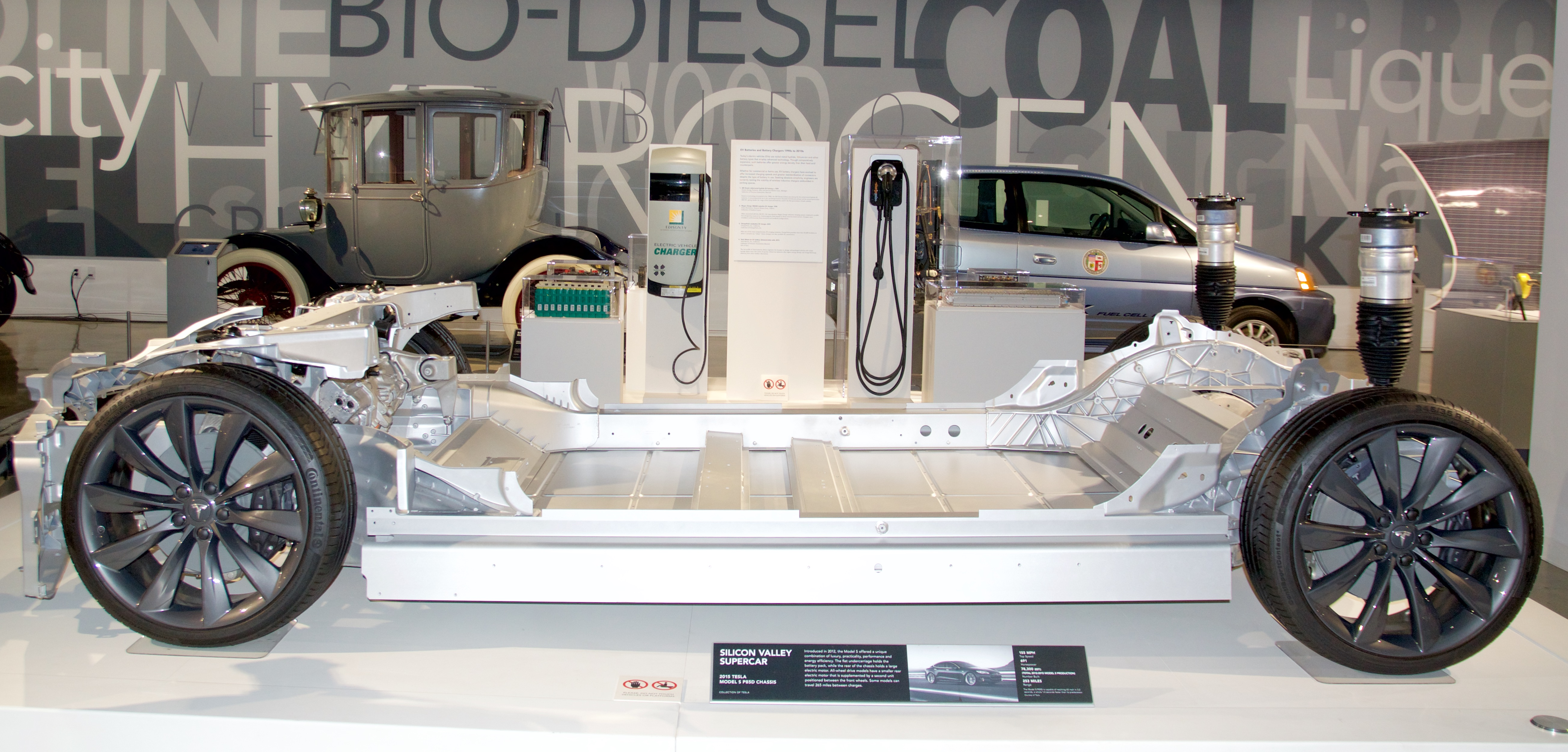
Chassis of a Model S P85D

The body and the chassis of the Model S are made mostly of aluminum. The car shares its platform and thirty percent of its parts with the Model X, a mid-size luxury crossover SUV that was introduced in 2015. The Model S is a full-size sedan with four doors and five seats; until 2018, it had an optional folding third row with rear-facing seats for two children with a five-point harness. The company claimed a drag coefficient of Cd=0.24, the lowest of any production car at release. This claim was independently verified by the magazine Car and Driver in 2014. The vehicle's drag coefficient was improved by a solid front fascia instead of a grille, retractable door handles, and a flat underbody with no exhaust pipes to disrupt the airflow.

The Model S's battery pack is its heaviest component and is located inside of the car's floor. The battery pack consists of thousands of identical cylindrical 18650 battery cells, each measuring 18 millimeters (0.71 in) in diameter and 65 millimeters (2.6 in) in height. These cells feature a graphite/silicon anode, and a nickel-cobalt-aluminum cathode. The Model S has a center of gravity height of 18 inches (460 mm), reducing the risk of rollovers. Since the heavier components of the drivetrain are positioned behind the rear axle's centerline, the Model S has a weight distribution of 46 percent at the front and 54 percent at the rear. The Model S has a single-speed reduction gear transmission. Rear-wheel drive models use a single alternating current induction motor; all-wheel drive models before 2019 featured two. However, from 2019, the dual-motor models featured a rear induction motor and front permanent magnet synchronous reluctance motor. (Note: The new motor technology increased the range by ten percent. In an induction motor, alternating current in the stator (the stationary part) creates a rotating magnetic field. This field induces currents in the rotor (the spinning part), producing a magnetic field that causes the rotor to spin in the same direction. In a synchronous reluctance motor, the stator has electromagnets, but the rotor has no windings or magnets. Instead, it is made of magnetic and non-magnetic materials arranged to align with the stator's magnetic field, driving the rotor's movement.) The Plaid model, introduced in 2021, uses three permanent magnet synchronous reluctance motors.

A cast aluminum cross-member attached to the vehicle's body structure supports the front suspension and electrically assisted rack-and-pinion steering system. At the rear, a cast subframe is connected to the body using four rubber-isolated mounts to reduce vibrations. The front suspension features a double control arm design, while the rear suspension uses a multi-link arrangement, each with an air spring for improved ride comfort. This chassis also features disc brake components produced by Brembo. Since the Model S lacks a front engine, Tesla implemented a "frunk", (Note: A portmanteau of "front" and "trunk") which has 5.3 cubic feet (150 L) of storage. The car's rear trunk possesses 26.6 cubic feet (750 L) of storage with the rear seats upright and 58.1 cubic feet (1,650 L) when the seats are folded down. Initially, the seats and steering wheel of the Model S were offered in both synthetic and non-synthetic leather options. In 2017, following a request from People for the Ethical Treatment of Animals to become the first cruelty-free automaker, Tesla switched exclusively to synthetic leather.

== Models and updates ==
=== 2012–2016: Initial years ===
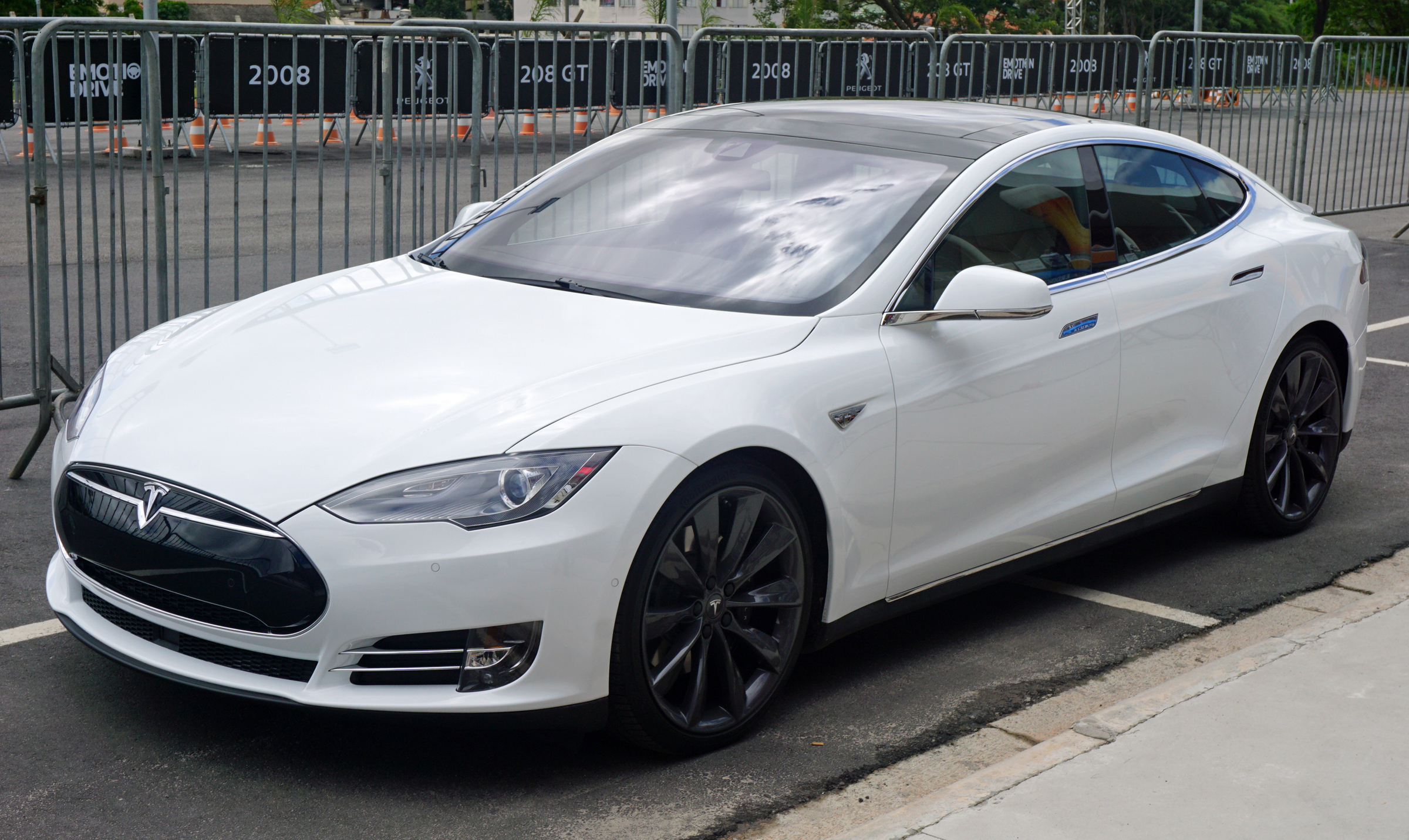
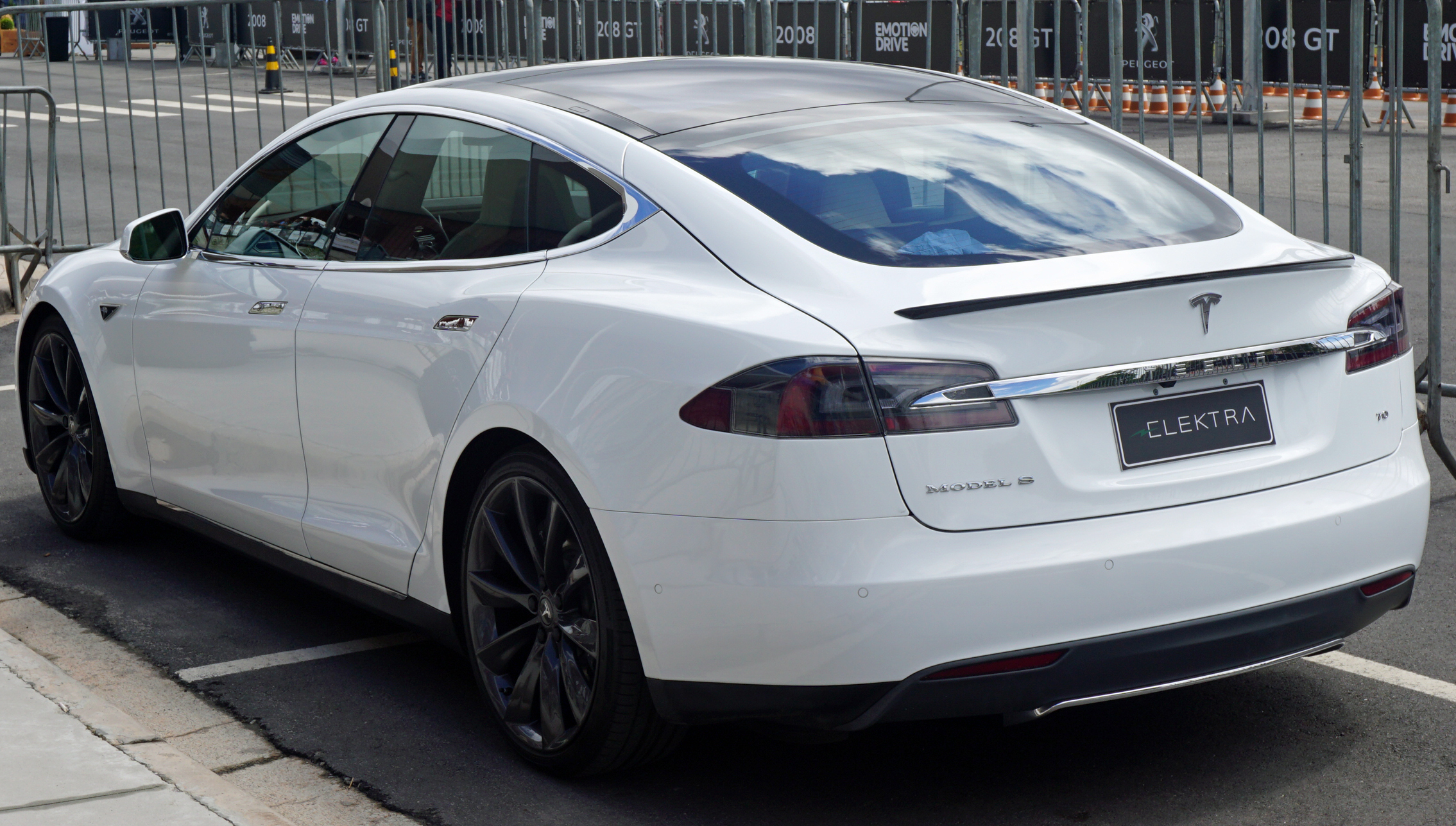
The pre-facelift Model S

Tesla allocated its initial 1,000 Model S units to the "Signature" limited edition configurations. The AC induction motor of the base Signature model generates a power output of 270 kW (362 hp) and a torque output of 439 N⋅m (324 lb⋅ft). The Signature Performance's motor produces 310 kW (416 hp) and 601 N⋅m (443 lb⋅ft). Both models incorporate an 85 kilowatt-hour (kWh) lithium-ion battery, and have an all-electric range of 265 miles (426 km).

Beginning in 2012, three battery pack configurations of the Model S were offered as 2013 model year (Note: It is common practice in the American automotive industry to introduce a model year's automobile during the previous calendar year.) vehicles. Initially, a 40 kWh lithium-ion model was planned as the entry-level version, but Tesla announced in 2013 that this version would not be produced. The motor of this version was to produce a power output of 175 kW (235 hp) and a torque of 420 N⋅m (310 lb⋅ft). Instead, a more powerful model with a 60 kWh battery—with its output limited to 40 kWh via software—was introduced to substitute the 40 kWh model. Its motor generates 225 kW (302 hp) and 430 N⋅m (317 lb⋅ft), providing it with a range of 208 miles (335 km). Two versions of the 85 kWh model were created: one with specifications similar to the aforementioned Signature model, and a performance version, the "P85", with specifications akin to the Signature Performance.

In 2014, Tesla discontinued the P85, replacing it with the P85D ("D" stands for "dual"). Tesla introduced a front motor in the P85D, in addition to the existing rear motor used in previous models. This configuration powers both the front and rear wheels, resulting in an all-wheel drive powertrain. The two motors produce a combined output of 515 kW (691 hp) and 931 N⋅m (687 lb⋅ft), giving it a range of 275 miles (443 km). Replacing the 60 kWh model, the 70D was introduced as a 2015 model year vehicle. It features dual motors that produce a combined output of 383 kW (514 hp) and 387 N⋅m (285 lb⋅ft), allowing it to have a range of 240 miles (390 km). A single-motor version of the 70 kWh model was also produced, with an output of 235 kW (315 hp) and 325 N⋅m (240 lb⋅ft), giving it a range of 210 miles (340 km).

In 2015, Tesla launched the standard 90D and the performance P90D to succeed the 85 kWh model and the P85D, respectively. The 90D's motor produces 311 kW (417 hp) and 658 N⋅m (485 lb⋅ft), and a range of 288 miles (463 km). The P90D's dual motors generate a combined output of 568 kW (762 hp) and 967 N⋅m (713 lb⋅ft), and the car has a range of 268 miles (431 km).

=== 2016–2019: First major update ===
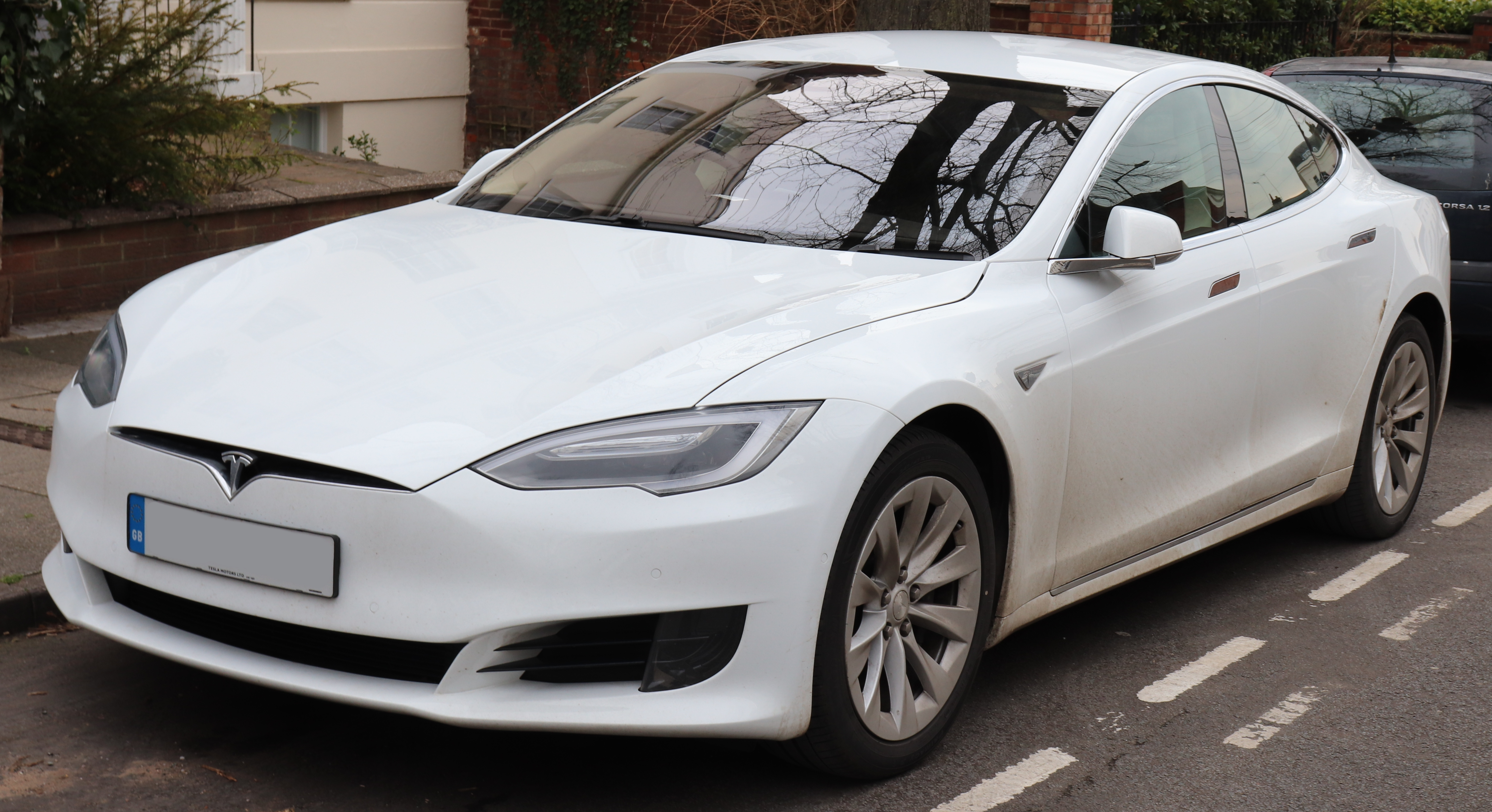
The Model S and its prominently revised front fascia

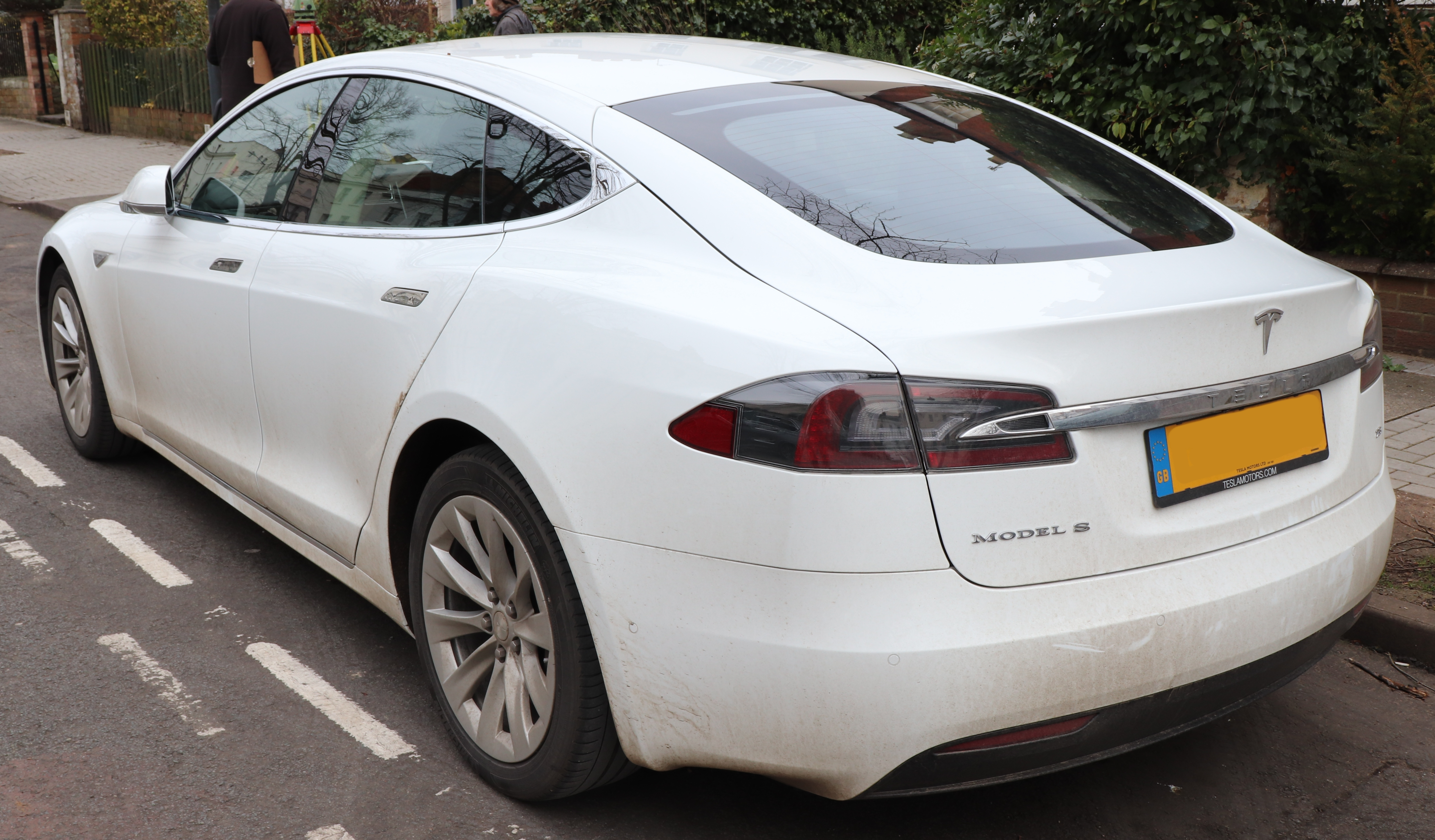
Rear view

In April 2016, Tesla implemented a facelift for the Model S, releasing these cars for the 2017 model year. Its most prominent update lies in its front fascia, where the previous black grille has been replaced by a continuation of the body, leaving only a thin gap between the leading edge of the hood and the bumper, which houses the Tesla logo. The updated model also includes restyled, full-LED adaptive headlights that turn with the car to enhance visibility at night.

That same year, Tesla reintroduced the 60 kWh model and introduced an all-wheel-drive version, the 60D. The former produces 235 kW (315 hp) of power and 325 N⋅m (240 lb⋅ft) of torque, giving it a range of 210 miles (340 km). The latter has dual motors that produce 242 kW (324 hp) and 430 N⋅m (317 lb⋅ft), with a range of 253 miles (407 km). Customers also had the option to upgrade the battery capacity to 75 kWh through an over-the-air update, extending the range by 40 miles (64 km). In March 2017, Tesla discontinued the 60 kWh model to distinguish its premium cars from the cheaper options, making the 75 kWh model the new entry-level offering.

In late 2016, Tesla introduced the P100D as a replacement for the P90D. The P100D's motors generate a combined output 510 kW (680 hp) and 1,072 N⋅m (791 lb⋅ft), allowing it to have a range of 315 miles (507 km). In early 2017, Tesla introduced the 100D. Its dual motors deliver 360 kW (483 hp) and 660 N⋅m (487 lb⋅ft), and it has a range of 335 miles (539 km). Midway through 2017, Tesla discontinued the 90D. Tesla subsequently ended production of the rear-wheel-drive 75 kWh model in late 2017. In 2019, Tesla replaced the 75D, 100D, and P100D variants as part of the company's shift towards a revamped model range.

=== 2019–2026: Second major update, simplified naming scheme, and final years ===
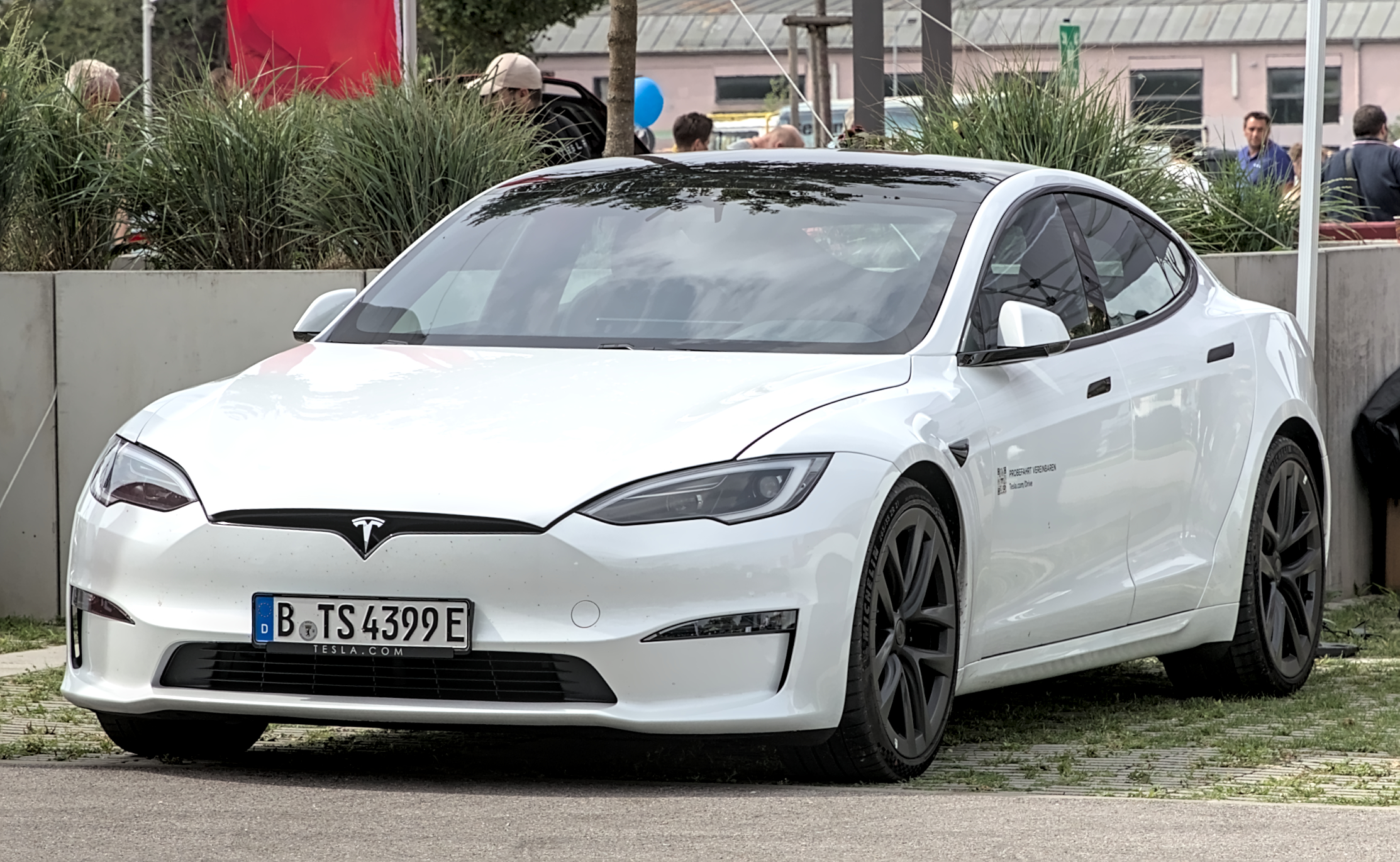
The Model S in its 2021 design

In favor of a more streamlined lineup, in the middle of 2019, the previous 75D, 100D, and P100D models were replaced with the Standard Range, Long Range, and Performance models, respectively; the foremost model was discontinued later that year. The Performance and Long Range variants feature a permanent magnet synchronous reluctance motor—initially used in the Model 3—as the front motor, while the rear motor remains an AC induction unit. The Model S Long Range, equipped with a 100 kWh battery, has dual motors that generate a total output of 350 kW (469 hp) and 730 N⋅m (540 lb⋅ft), giving the Long Range a range of 375 miles (604 km). The Performance model's two motors produce a combined output of 562 kW (754 hp) and 931 N⋅m (687 lb⋅ft); it also has a 100 kWh battery and a range of 365 miles (587 km). For 2020, the Long Range model was replaced with the Long Range Plus. Its dual motors deliver a combined output of 311 kW (417 hp) and 658 N⋅m (485 lb⋅ft). It has a range of 400 miles (640 km).

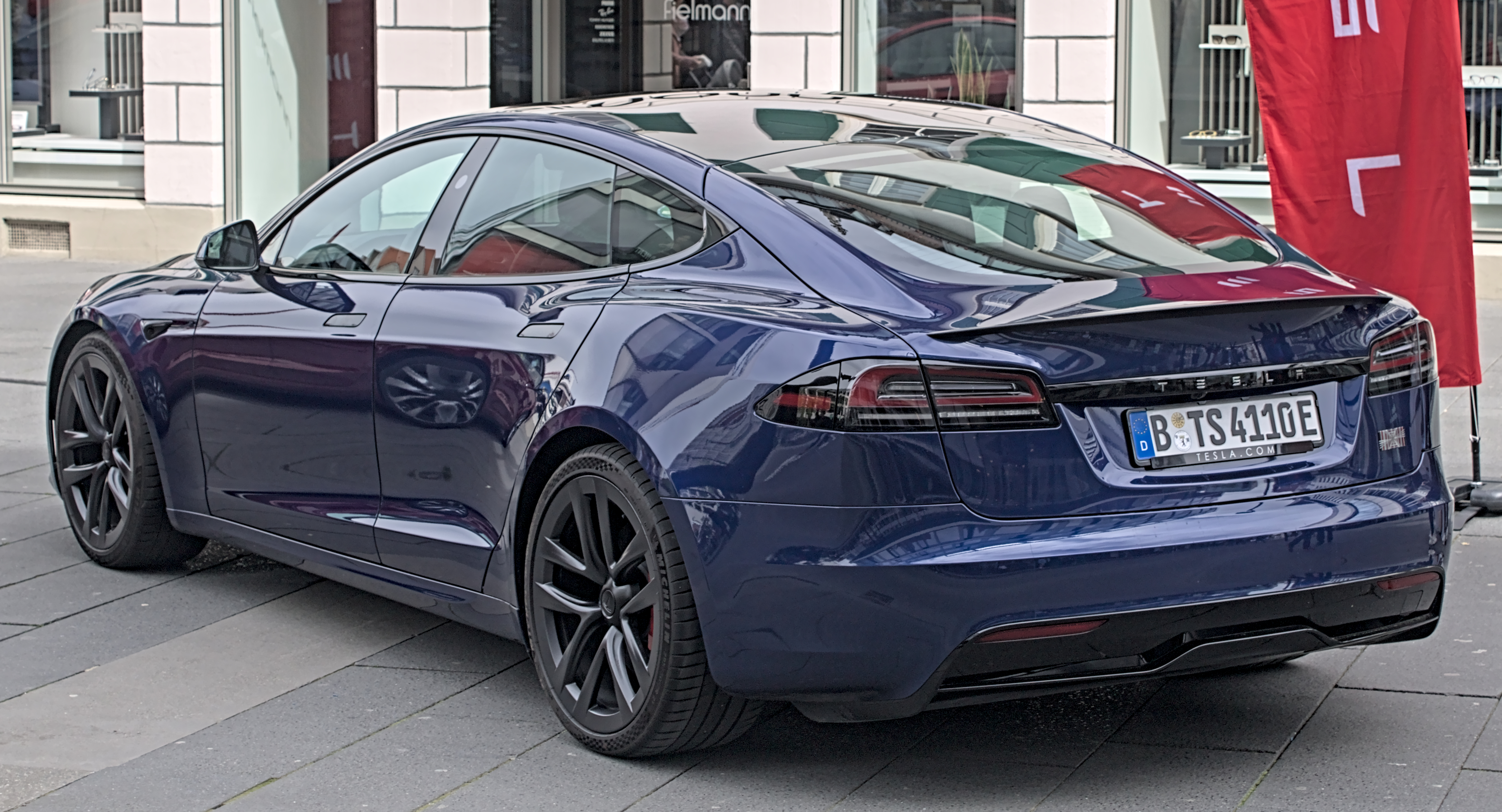
2024 Model S Plaid

In 2021, Tesla launched a significant update to the Model S, known internally as the "Palladium" project, which involved an overhaul of most of its components and spawned the high-performance Plaid. The revised Model S was revealed in January 2021. At its debut, the updated Model S had the lowest drag coefficient of any current production automobile, with a value of Cd=0.208. The updated Long Range delivers 500 kW (670 hp) and achieves a range of 405 miles (652 km). The Plaid, which features a 95 kWh battery, has—in contrast to all other models—three permanent magnet synchronous motors, as well as an all-wheel drive layout. The trio produce a total output of 760 kW (1,020 hp) and 1,050 N⋅m (770 lb⋅ft), providing the car with a 0 to 60 mph (97 km/h) acceleration of 1.98 seconds and a maximum speed of 200 mph (322 km/h), with a range of 390 miles (630 km). In 2023, Tesla reintroduced the Standard Range model, which has a range of 370 miles (600 km).

Musk announced that 2026 would be the final model year for both the Model S and Model X. For this model year, Tesla debuted an updated Model S and Model X in June 2025, which the company announced that February. A front bumper camera and changed chassis was implemented in both vehicles, and the range of the Long Range model was increased to 410 miles (660 km). The Model S Plaid received an updated rear diffuser and slightly altered front fascia, which the company stated was to optimize "high-speed stability". To commemorate the end of production, a run of Tesla Model S Signature Editions was offered as a final sendoff. Limited to 250 units, the car was offered for purchase by invite only. Based on the Plaid, all Signature Editions came finished in a Garnet Red exterior with gold badging. They came with a white interior and a yoke steering wheel.

== Technology ==
=== Features ===
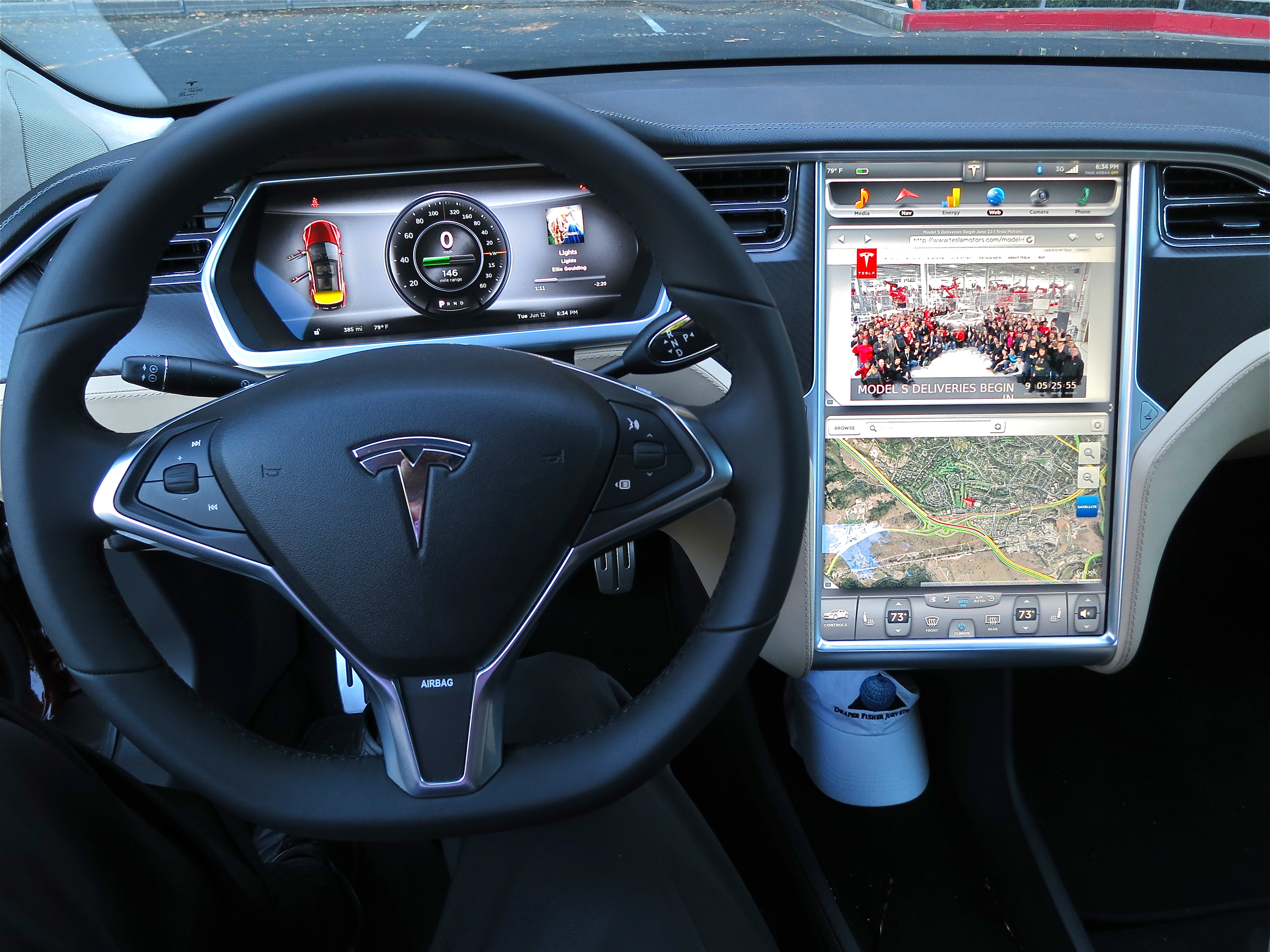
Production dashboard with 12.3-inch (310 mm) main dashboard digital display (left) and central 17-inch (430 mm) touchscreen control panel (right)

The instrument panel is positioned directly before the driver and features a 12.3-inch (310 mm) liquid crystal display electronic instrument cluster. Initially, the infotainment control touchscreen featured a 17-inch (430 mm) multi-touch display divided into four sections. The top section shows status icons and offers quick access to features like charging, HomeLink, Driver Profiles, vehicle information, and Bluetooth. Below that, the second section provides access to various apps, such as Media, Navigation, Energy, Web, Camera, and Phone. The central viewing area displays two active apps, split into upper and lower areas, with most apps expandable to fill the entire screen. The bottom section contains controls and settings for the vehicle, including doors, locks, lights, temperature settings, and a secondary volume control.

Originally, the Model S's touchscreen was powered by a Nvidia Tegra 3 3D Visual Computing Module (VCM), with a separate Nvidia Tegra 2 VCM handling the instrument cluster. Around 2018, Tesla upgraded these two Tegra System-on-a-Chip (SoC) units to a single Intel Atom–based SoC, which powered both the main touchscreen display and the instrument cluster. With the Palladium refresh, Tesla further updated the system, switching to a horizontal touchscreen orientation and an AMD Ryzen-based SoC. The touchscreen includes features like driver-side climate control, My App, the app launcher, recent apps, passenger-side climate control, and volume control. (Note: Driver-side and passenger-side climate control may vary based on market.) Features such as lock and unlock, trunk, glove box, and mirrors could be controlled from the touchscreen. Also for the 2021 refresh, Tesla implemented a "yoke" steering wheel. (Note: A yoke steering wheel is a steering control that is shaped like a joystick or U-shape with two hand grips and a hub.)

==== Autopilot ====
In 2014, Tesla introduced Autopilot, an advanced driver-assistance system developed by the automaker that amounts to partial vehicle automation. Every Model S produced from September 2014 onward included the Autopilot hardware, and it was officially released in October 2015 as a software update. Autopilot uses cameras, radar and ultrasound to detect road signs, lane markings, obstacles, pedestrians, cyclists, motorcyclists, traffic lights, and other vehicles. It also includes adaptive cruise control, lane centering, auto lane changing, auto parking and other semi-autonomous driving and parking capabilities. The Model S's operating systems are partly built using open-source software (OSS), which is publicly available. Tesla uses OSS like Linux, the GNU toolchain, Buildroot, and community projects like Ubuntu. From 2021, Tesla began using a system known as "Tesla Vision", which relies solely on cameras, replacing the previous radar-based sensors. In 2023, Tesla discontinued the ultrasonic system as part of its shift towards Tesla Vision.

The Autopilot system has been the subject of criticism. Following a crash in Florida, the National Transportation Safety Board found that the driver's usage of the system "indicated an over-reliance on the automation and a lack of understanding of the system limitations". Tesla has faced accusations of misleading advertising, with critics alleging that the company led consumers to believe the vehicles were fully autonomous. Tesla has defended itself by arguing that the state's prolonged lack of objection to the Autopilot branding implied approval of its advertising practices. (Note: For a more detailed overview of the criticism of Autopilot, see Tesla Autopilot § Criticism.) In a 2019 survey by Bloomberg News, hundreds of Tesla owners reported experiencing dangerous behaviors with Autopilot, including phantom braking, lane departures, and failure to stop for road hazards. Users also noted issues like sudden software crashes, unexpected shutdowns, collisions with off-ramp barriers, radar failures, abrupt swerving, tailgating, and inconsistent speed changes.

=== Charging ===
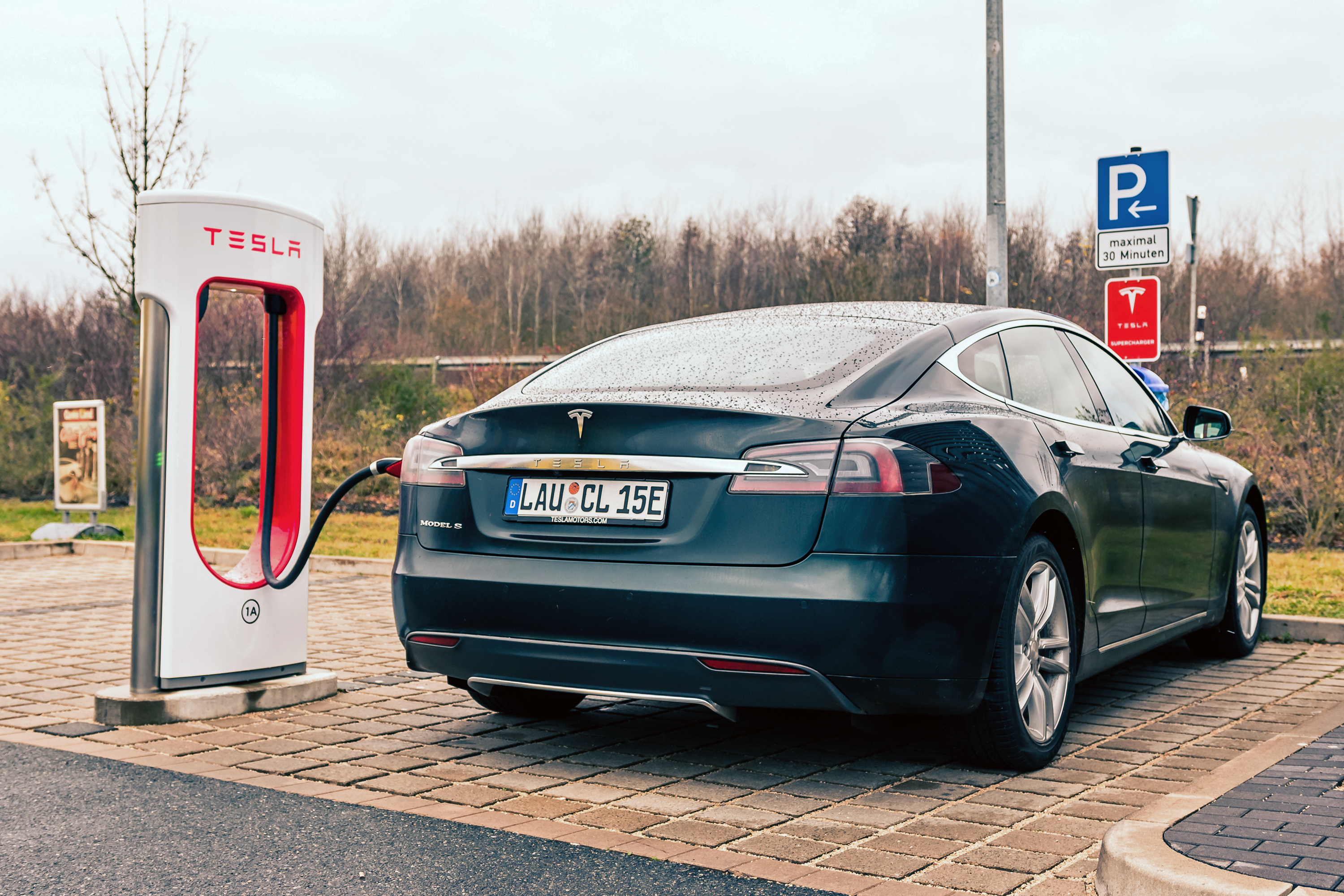
A Model S connected to a Supercharger

Tesla has devised numerous ways to charge the Model S: a 240-volt home wall connector, which provides up to 44 miles (71 km) of range per hour of charging; and a mobile connector, intended for use away from home, which offers up to 30 miles (48 km) of range per hour. Models prior to 2016 could be configured with two onboard chargers, which provide up to 62 miles (100 km) of range per hour. Tesla partnered with businesses to install Tesla Wall Connectors to provide a public charging network called Tesla Destination. The units are provided to the businesses by Tesla for free or at a cheap price. The business is responsible for the cost of electricity. Some businesses limit them to customers, employees, or residents only. In late 2012, Tesla began operating a network of 480-volt charging stations, dubbed Superchargers.

Tesla initially planned for the Model S to allow fast battery swapping. In 2013, the company demonstrated a battery-swap operation that took about ninety seconds—roughly half the time needed to refill a gas tank. While Tesla initially planned to make battery swapping widely available, they reportedly abandoned the idea due to a perceived lack of customer interest. Jeremy Michalek, a mechanical engineering professor, suggested that the high cost, bulkiness, and resource demands of batteries made the creation of extensive networks of swappable packs—requiring storage, charging, and maintenance—economically and environmentally impractical. Critics have accused Tesla of exploiting California's zero-emission vehicle credit system by introducing the battery-swap program without ever making it accessible to the public. In 2020, Tesla announced plans to integrate the batteries into the vehicle's body to enhance strength and reduce weight and cost.

== Environmental impact ==
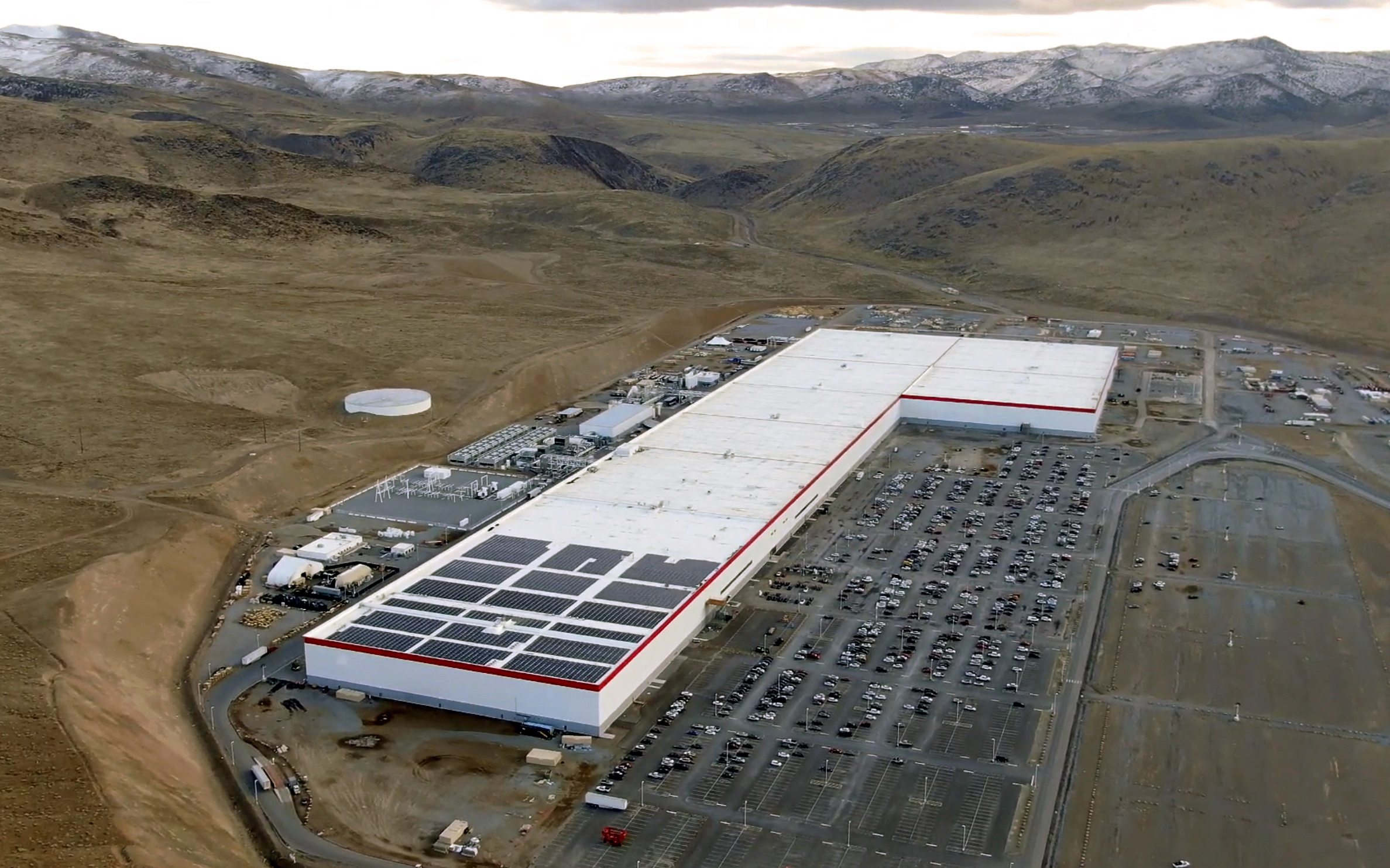
Tesla claimed that Gigafactory Nevada is able to turn old batteries into new ones.

A 2015 study by the Union of Concerned Scientists (UCS) concluded that in U.S. regions where the Model S is popular, its 68 percent higher manufacturing emissions are offset within a few years of average driving. However, the UCS report assumes that electric materials are recycled at rates similar to other cars and excludes the issue of battery disposal due to limited data on recycling practices and future intentions at the time. Over their lifecycle, electric vehicles—like the Model S—emit about half as much CO_{2} as comparable fossil fuel cars. The lithium-ion batteries within the Model S contain nickel and small amounts of cobalt, which have a high environmental impact due to resource depletion, ecological toxicity, and extraction processes.

In 2021, Tesla wrote in its impact report that it recycles all returned battery packs. It stated that Gigafactory Nevada can recycle up to 92 percent of the elements from old batteries, creating a "closed loop" system where old batteries are turned into new ones. In 2020, the company recycled significant amounts of metals: 1,300 tons of nickel, 400 tons of copper, and 80 tons of cobalt. Tesla's report states that most of its batteries are recycled in some form; according to Vice, it does not specify that 92 percent of each individual battery is fully recycled. The company has articulated an ultimate goal of achieving "high recovery rates, low costs, and low environmental impact" through its recycling program, though it does not provide details on its progress toward this. A 2021 scientific study showed that recycling the Tesla Model S battery pack is profitable due to its low disassembly costs and high revenues from cobalt recovery. The materials scientist Dana Thompson from the University of Leicester cautions that the recycling of batteries may pose significant hazards. According to Thompson, if a Tesla cell is punctured too deeply or at an inappropriate location, it risks short-circuiting, potentially leading to combustion and the release of toxic fumes.

== Production and initial deliveries ==
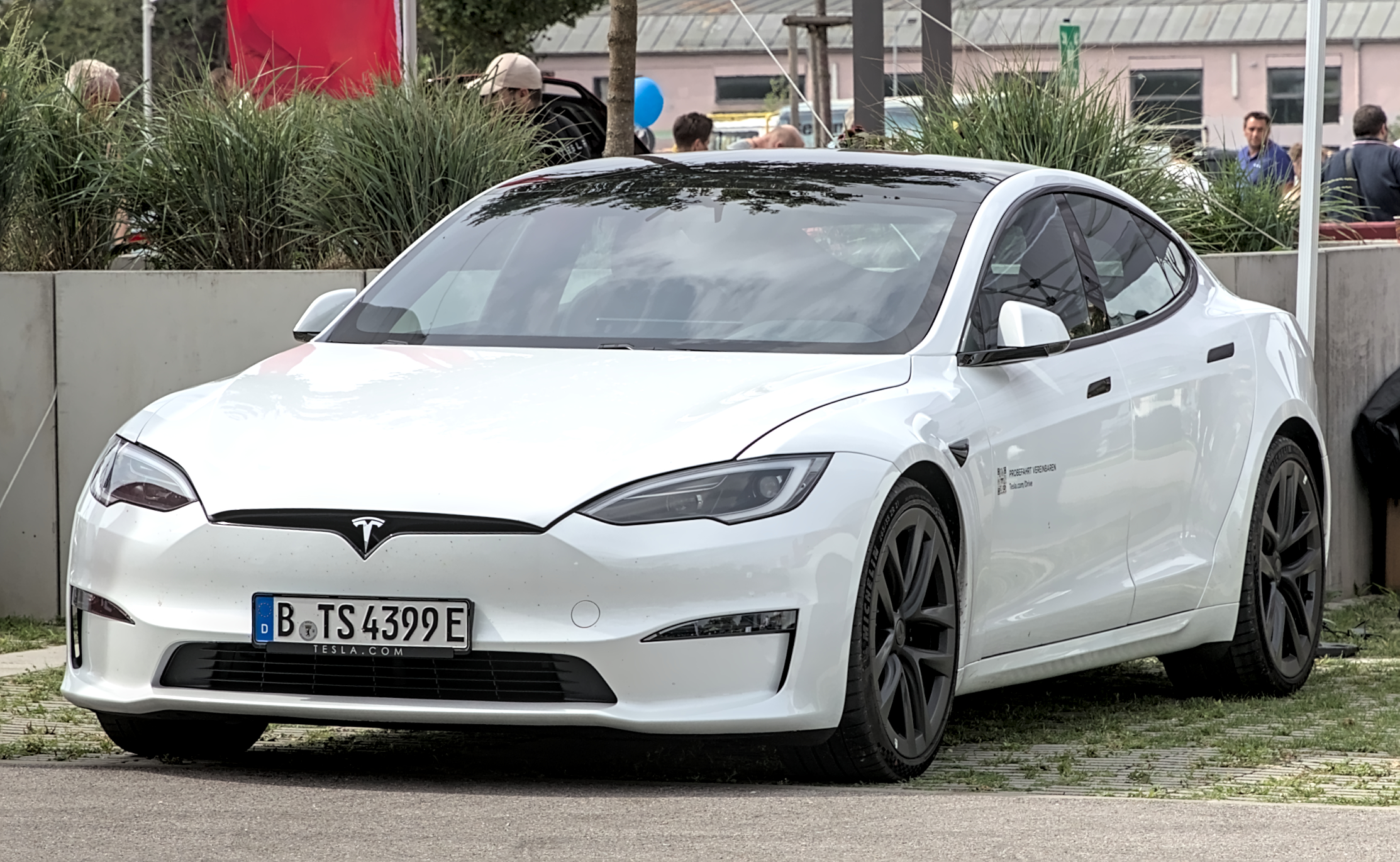
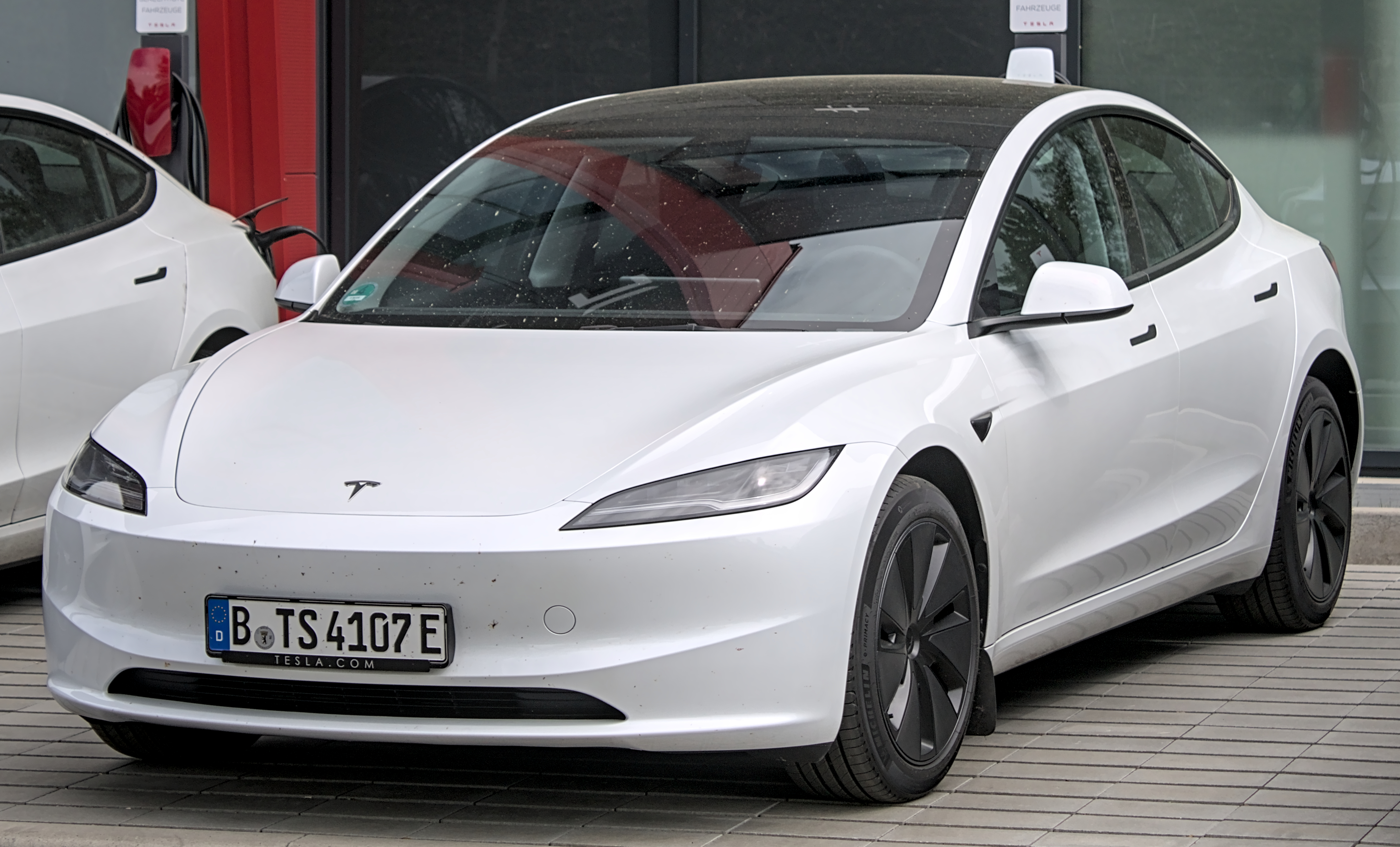
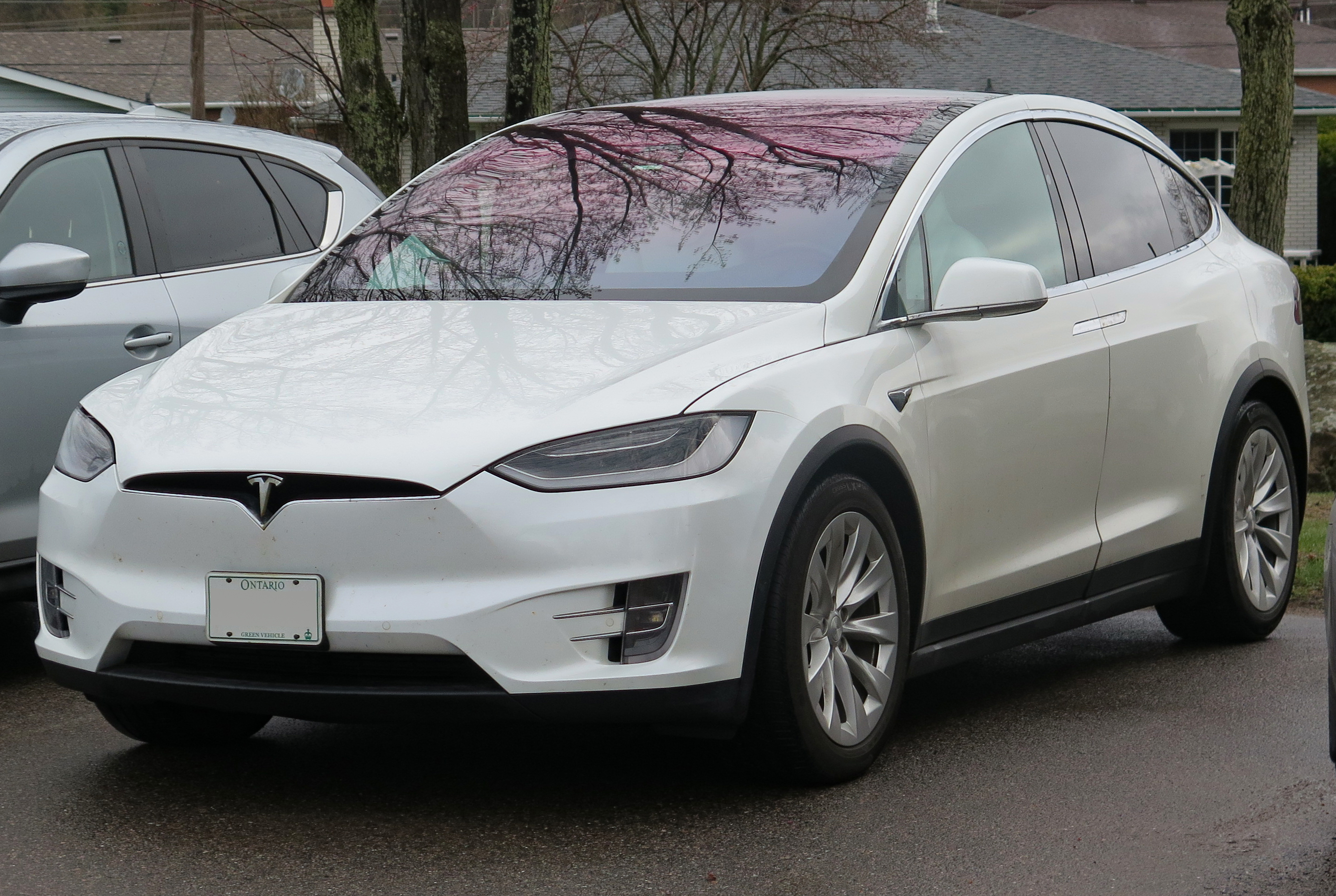
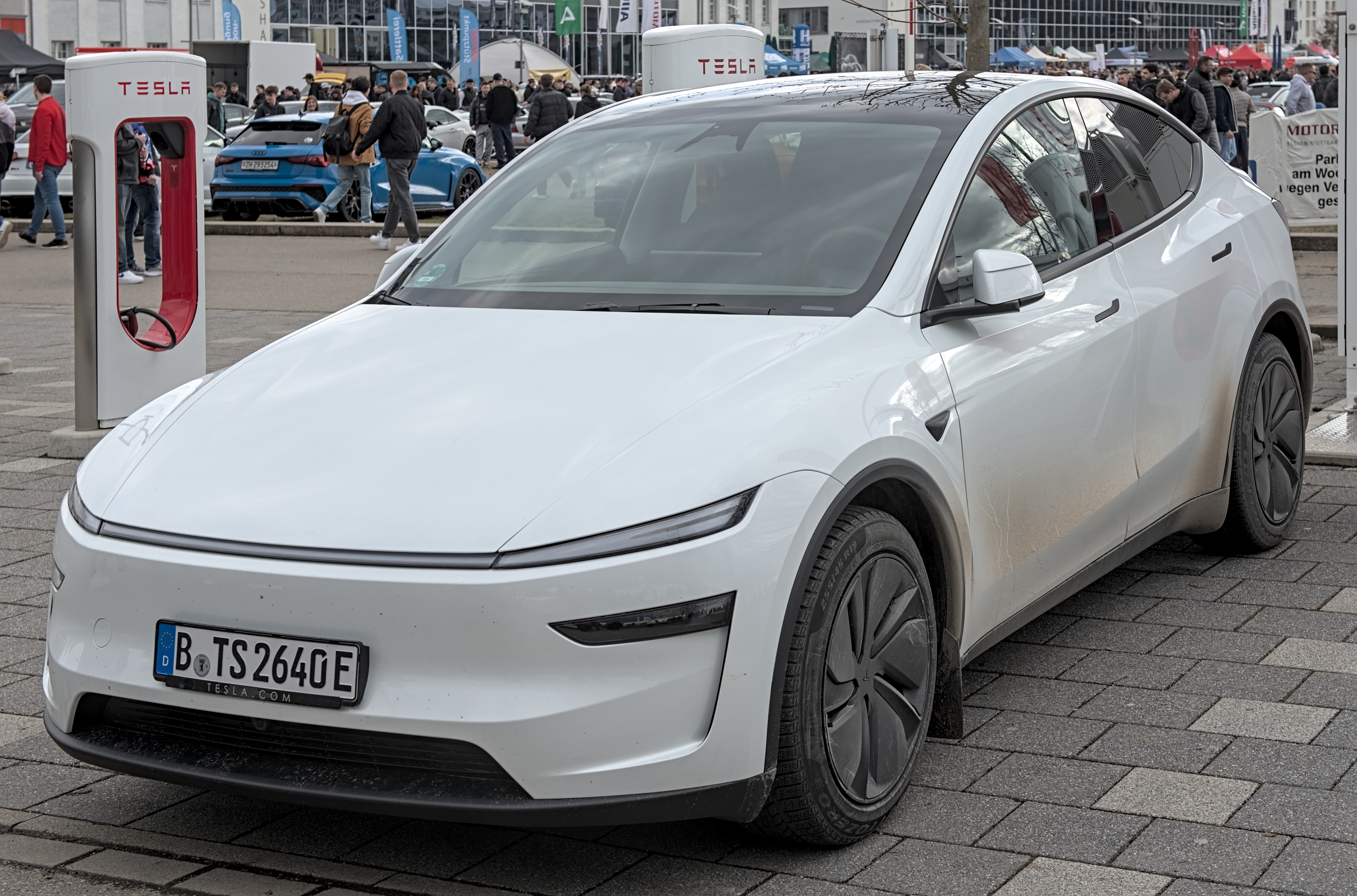
The vehicles that form the "S3XY" acronym: the Model S; the Model 3; the Model X; and the Model Y

The Model S is the company's second vehicle. It was produced at the 5.4 million sq ft (500,000 m^{2}) Fremont, California, facility from June 2012 to April 2026. Tesla initially projected it would produce 1,000 units per month, aiming for a total of 5,000 units by the end of 2012. For 2013, Tesla aimed to quadruple that. Tesla built its 1,000th Model S by October 31, 2012, and delivered 2,650 units by the end of the year. In the first half of the subsequent year, 10,050 units were delivered to customers.

From August 2013, for European countries, final assembly was carried out at Tesla's facilities in Tilburg, Netherlands. The aim of the Tilburg factory was to shorten delivery times for customers in Britain and the EU, improve product quality, and establish the automaker's presence in Europe by producing the Model S and the Model X. The assembly of both the Model S and Model X at the Tilburg facility ceased in early 2021. According to the Dutch newspaper NU.nl, the 2021 refresh introduced changes to the production process that made it impossible to complete final assembly at the Tilburg location.

The Model S was the first vehicle by Tesla produced at the Fremont facility. It was followed by the Model X in 2015, the Model 3 in 2017 and the Model Y in 2020. These cars form the "S3XY" acronym. In 2015, the Model S was the world's best-selling plug-in electric vehicle, with Tesla selling 50,366 in that year. It was the second-best-selling electric car in the first half of 2016 after the Nissan Leaf. During its production, the Model S was primarily fitted with batteries supplied by the electronics company Panasonic in Japan. Starting in January 2017, the batteries for the vehicle were also manufactured at the Gigafactory Nevada. European retail deliveries began between August and September 2013, with Norway, Switzerland, the Netherlands, Belgium, France, and Germany. The first Australian delivery took place in Sydney on December 9, 2014. Deliveries to the mainland Chinese market began on April 22, 2014, followed by Hong Kong in July 2014. Deliveries to the United Kingdom began in June 2014.

Musk announced that production of the Model S and Model X would cease by mid‑2026, following an 11 percent year‑over‑year decline in Tesla's automotive revenue in 2025. He also stated that the Fremont facility, where the vehicles are manufactured, would be repurposed for production of Tesla's forthcoming Optimus robot. The final units of both the Model S and Model X rolled off the Fremont line on May 13, 2026.

== Safety ==
=== Testing ===
In a European New Car Assessment Programme testing conducted in 2022, the Model S received a five-star rating:

Euro NCAP test results Tesla Model S (2022)
Test	Points	%
Overall:	5 /5 stars	
Adult occupant:	35.8	94%
Child occupant:	45.0	91%
Pedestrian:	45.9	85%
Safety assist:	15.7	98%

In a National Highway Traffic Safety Administration (NHTSA) testing conducted in 2015, the Model S received a five-star rating. Tesla subsequently claimed that—based on the details of the test—it actually achieved 5.4 stars, prompting the NHTSA to release a statement reaffirming that it does not award more than five stars, and that Tesla was "misleading the public" by claiming in their marketing that the NHTSA had awarded them a higher rating.

NHTSA
Overall	5/5 stars
Frontal, driver	5/5 stars
Frontal, passenger	5/5 stars
Side, driver	5/5 stars
Side, passenger	5/5 stars
Side pole, driver	5/5 stars
Rollover	/ 5.7% (Note: This means it has a 5.7 percent chance of rolling over in a loss-of-control incident.)

=== Recalls ===
On June 14, 2013, Tesla recalled Model S vehicles manufactured between May 10 and June 8, 2013, due to improper methods for aligning the left hand seat back striker to the bracket, which could weaken the weld between the bracket and frame. Musk stated that the weld had not detached on any car, there had been no complaints, and no injuries had occurred. In early January 2014, Tesla issued a recall for Model S vehicles from 2013 due to the risk of overheating with the adapter, cord, or wall outlet during charging. Following the recall, Jérôme Guillen, Tesla's vice president of sales, announced that nearly all Model S adapters had already been updated via over-the-air software to address the charging problem. Tesla noted that the recall impacted nearly all Model S vehicles and adapters produced in 2013. Tesla announced a voluntary recall on November 20, 2015, of all of its 90,000 Model S vehicles, to check for a possible defect in the cars' front seat belt assemblies. The problem was raised by one customer in Europe. Tesla's resulting investigation was unable to identify a root cause for the failure, and the company decided to examine every car. Tesla reported that no accidents or injuries were related to the problem.

On January 20, 2017, Tesla recalled every Model S manufactured from 2012 because of defective Takata airbags. This recall not only impacted the Model S but also affected about 652,000 other vehicles from other automakers across the United States, which, at the time, was the largest automotive recall in the country's history. On April 20, 2017, Tesla issued a worldwide recall of 53,000 of the 76,000 Model S and Model X vehicles sold in 2016 due to faulty parking brakes. Tesla assured that this issue was unlikely to cause safety problems and had not resulted in any accidents or injuries. Despite this, the company asked customers to have their cars inspected, a process that took about forty-five minutes. About five percent of the vehicles were affected, and Brembo, the supplier of the defective part, would cover the repair costs. All 123,000 Model S cars manufactured before April 2016 were recalled on March 30, 2018, due to excessive corrosion of the bolts which secure the power steering, particularly those cars used in cold countries where roads are salted. Tesla's stock dropped nearly four percent in after-hours trading on Thursday following the announcement of the Model S recall.

In December 2021, 119,009 Model S vehicles produced between 2017 and 2020 were recalled because of the possibility of latch failure allowing front hoods to open unexpectedly. The recall, according to the company, affected around 14 percent of all Model S vehicles. In February 2024, Tesla recalled over two million Tesla vehicles in the United States due to the compact size of the warning lights on the instrument panel. Documents indicated that the recall was issued to enhance warnings and alerts for drivers. The NHTSA reported that the font size of the brake, park, and antilock brake warning lights was smaller than mandated by federal safety standards. This size made information difficult to read, thereby increasing the risk of a collision. The Model S was part of a major recall in July 2024 affecting approximately 1.8 million vehicles. The recall addressed a software issue that could prevent the detection of an unlatched hood, posing a risk of it unexpectedly opening while the vehicle was in motion. According to NHTSA documentation, this malfunction could obstruct the driver's vision, increasing the likelihood of a crash.

=== Fires ===
==== First fire ====
A fire involving a Model S occurred on October 1, 2013, after the vehicle struck metal debris on Washington State Route 167 in Kent, Washington. The driver was alerted by the onboard system and was able to safely exit the highway, stop the car, and leave the vehicle without injury. Tesla later explained that the fire was triggered by a "direct impact of a large metallic object" to one of the car's 16 battery modules. The vehicle's design, which included firewalls separating the modules, limited the fire to a small section at the front of the car. The debris that caused the fire was identified as a "curved section" that had fallen off a truck and was recovered nearby. According to Tesla, the debris pierced a 3-inch (80 mm) hole through the vehicle's 0.25 in (6 mm) armor plate, with an estimated force of 25 short tons (23 t). Vents directed the flames away from the passenger compartment, preventing them from entering the cabin.

On October 24, 2013, the NHTSA announced that it had not found evidence suggesting the fire resulted from a vehicle safety defect or noncompliance with federal safety standards. However, in the following month, the NHTSA initiated a preliminary evaluation to assess the potential risks associated with undercarriage strikes on 2013 Tesla Model S vehicles. On March 28, 2014, the investigation was closed, with the NHTSA stating that "Tesla's revision of vehicle ride height and addition of increased underbody protection should reduce both the frequency of underbody strikes and the resultant fire risk".

==== Subsequent fires ====
On November 6, 2013, another fire occurred when a Tesla Model S struck a tow hitch on the road, causing damage to the underside of the vehicle. In response to these incidents, Tesla extended its vehicle warranty to cover fire damage and issued a software update to increase the car's ground clearance at highway speeds. In early February 2014, another fire incident was reported in Toronto, Canada. The Model S was parked in a garage and was not charging at the time. The cause of the fire remains undetermined. Tesla stated, "in this particular case, we don't yet know the precise cause, but have definitively determined that it did not originate in the battery, the charging system, the adapter or the electrical receptacle, as these components were untouched by the fire".

On January 1, 2016, a 2014 Model S caught fire in Norway while supercharging unsupervised. The vehicle was destroyed but nobody was injured. An investigation by the Norwegian Accident Investigation Board concluded that the fire started within the car, but the exact cause could not be determined. In March 2016, Tesla announced that their own investigation found that the fire was caused by a short circuit in the vehicle's distribution box, but the extent of the damage made it impossible to determine the exact cause. A three-month-old Model S caught fire three times in December 2018, requiring firefighters to spend nearly ten hours preventing reignition. In July 2021, a Model S Plaid caught fire, and its electronic door system failed, forcing the driver to "use force to push it open". The vehicle then moved approximately 35 to 40 feet (11 to 12 m) before erupting into a "fireball".

== Reception and legacy ==
If Tesla as a company collapsed tomorrow, the Model S would still be counted among the most influential cars ever built, right up there with the Ford Model T and the Porsche 911.

— Car and Driver, 2026

The Model S has been referred to by several critics as one of the most influential and important electric cars. In a 2014 review for the newspaper The Sunday Times, Nick Rufford remarked, "the Model S represents the last throw of the electric dice [...] if this vehicle can't persuade people to ditch petrol and switch to battery power, no car can". In 2014, The Daily Telegraph included the Model S on its list of "cars that changed the world" and called it the most important car of the last 20 years. The BBC-owned magazine Top Gear described it as "one of the most appealing electric vehicles in the world [...] and one that almost single-handedly forced mainstream manufacturers to embrace electricity". Keith Barry of Consumer Reports mentioned that the introduction of specific features, such as a yoke-style steering wheel, has "distracted from the flagship sedan's underlying brilliance, as has Musk's public image". (Note: For more information on Musk's controversial statements and public image, see views of Elon Musk.) Consumer Reports additionally pointed out that the success of the Model S prompted other automakers to rethink how they design and market their vehicles. The magazine Car and Driver noted that the Model S was the "first long-range, widely desired electric vehicle" when it was released, adding that "mainstream automakers [...] [struggled] to catch up".

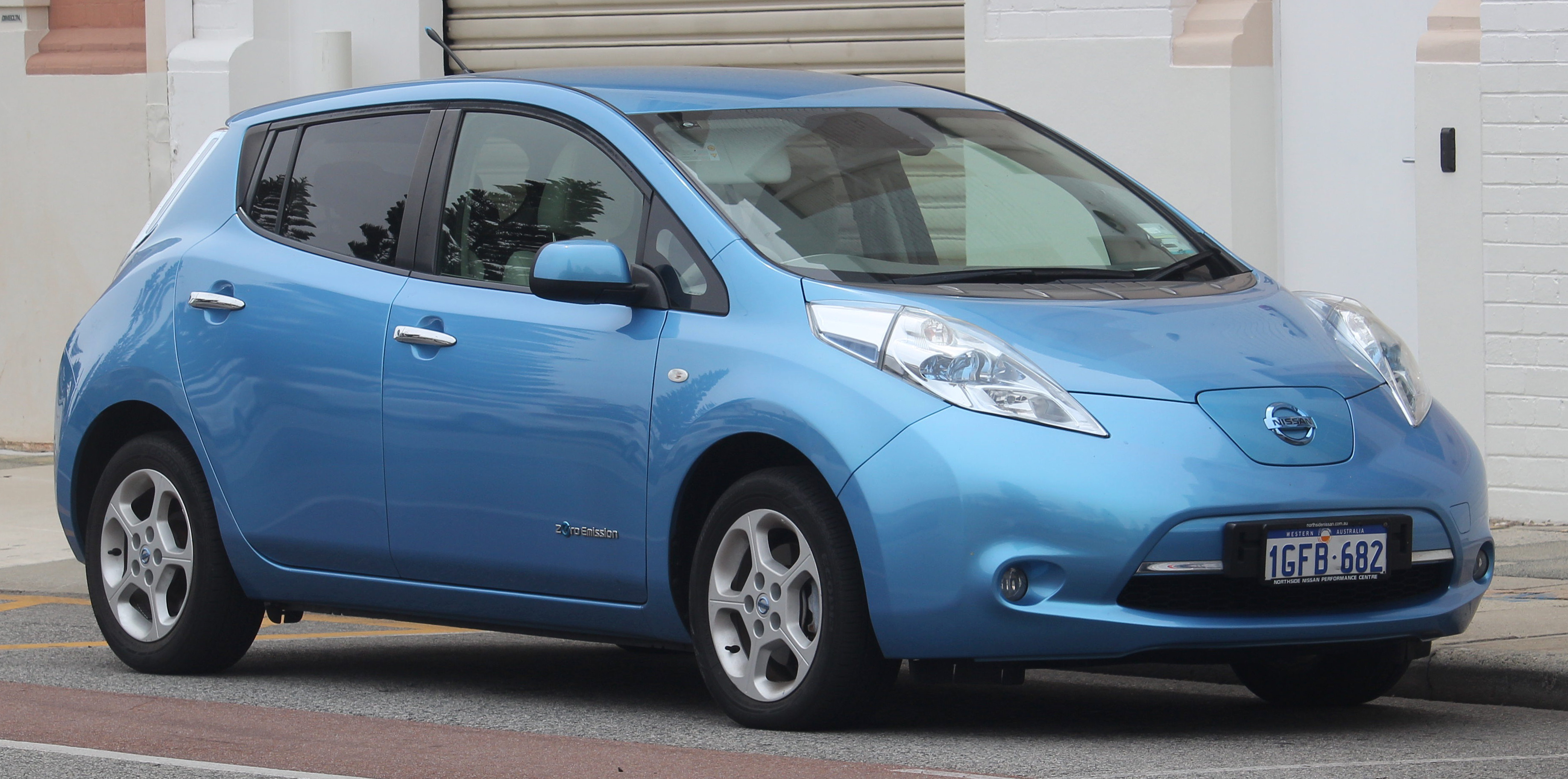
The Model S has drawn comparisons to the first-generation Nissan Leaf, despite the two featuring different body styles. (Note: The Model S is a liftback sedan, while the Leaf is a hatchback.)

The Model S has received mixed reviews from automotive critics. Samuel Gibbs from the newspaper The Guardian referred to it as a "swish saloon car", writing that, unlike many other electric vehicles, it did not resemble "a bug or bubble-car". Gibbs was also impressed by its acceleration, remarking that it has "it has enough power to beat even the Aston Martin Rapide, all without petrol and with no emissions". Reviewing for The Independent, Lee Williams called the Model S "a beautiful car that symbolizes humanity's march towards automation", but criticized its large size, describing the car as "too damn big". Road & Track's Chris Perkins argued that Tesla managed to turn the "most important car of the century into a bad joke", describing the Model S Plaid as "perhaps one of the worst [cars in the world]". He called its yoke steering wheel "incredibly stupid", described its damping as "irritating", and stated that "it doesn't have the chassis, steering, or brakes to deal with the horsepower". The U.S. News & World Report thought that its "basic interior feels out of step with its price, and newer rivals offer more room, style and, in some cases, range". Lee Hutchinson, the senior technology writer for Ars Technica, opined that its "almond-shaped headlights and prominent nosecone conjure images of Maserati, while the rear half has a distinct Aston Martin DBS flavor, [and] the taillights and rear evoke the Jaguar XF". While being in two completely different classes, critics frequently compare the Model S to the first generation of the Nissan Leaf, a hatchback.

Hutchinson, in another review, thought of its acceleration as "instant, ludicrous, [and] neck-snapping", believing that it was "more appropriate for a roller-coaster than a car". He described its styling as "graceful, with a precisely engineered exterior". Mat Watson, prominent for his Carwow reviews, praised the Model S Plaid as "astonishingly quick" and "extremely quiet", but he criticized its high price and noted that competing models offer greater comfort. Watson ultimately rated it eight out of ten. Writing for Car, Keith Adams described the Model S as "the king of the hill". He called the thrust "stomach-churning from rest", believing that the driver would "crave to relive the experience—again and again". Jalopnik's Lawrence Hodge criticized the yoke steering wheel, describing it as "stupid" and suggesting that its introduction was more of a downgrade than an upgrade. In 2012, Time magazine named the Model S one of the best inventions of the year. It was later featured in the magazine's list of the 10 best gadgets of the 2010s. Car and Driver included the Model S 60 on its list of the 10 best cars of the year in 2015, while entering the 70 and 70D models on its 2016 list.

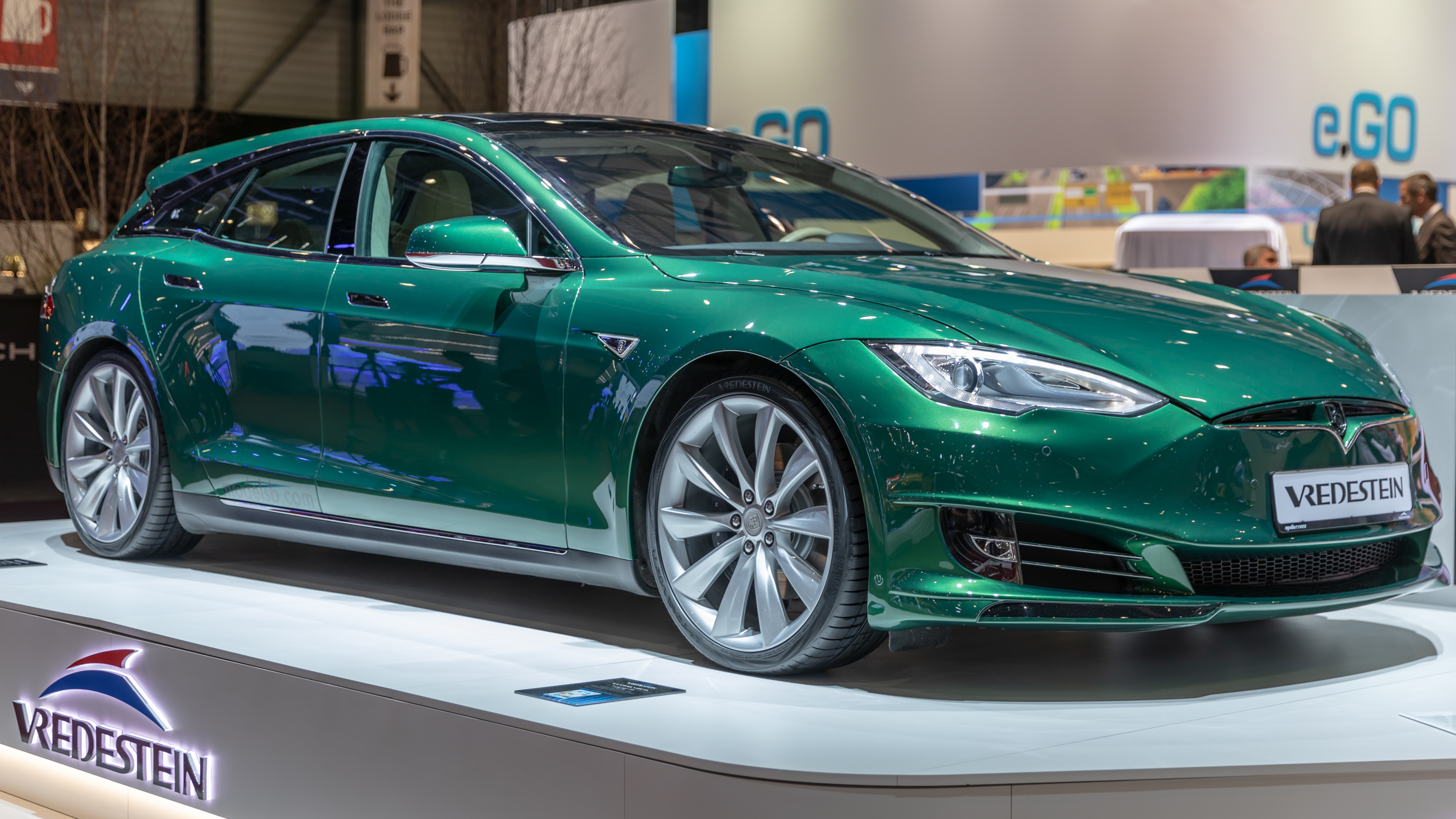
The Tesla-based Model SB at the 2019 Geneva Motor Show

Some companies have developed modified cars based on the Model S with different body styles. In February 2019, a one-off version of the Model S with a shooting brake body style, named the Model SB, was announced by Niels van Roij Design. While an initial production run of twenty was considered, only a single unit was built. The single unit was finished in British racing green, mirrored by the glove compartment lining, a color choice inspired by the green found in the logo of Elipo, the company that assisted in the car's design, as well as foliage in Elipo owner Floris de Raadt's garden. It made its public debut at the Geneva Motor Show in March 2019. In 2020 and 2023, coachbuilders Coleman Milne and Binz debuted their hearse conversions of the Model S, named the Wisper and Binz.E, respectively. Both versions have 220 miles (350 km) of electric range.

=== Awards ===
The Model S is the recipient of numerous awards, as listed in the table below: (Note: This list includes awards from prominent publishers only; lesser-known organizations may not be included.)

Accolades awarded to the Tesla Model S
Organization	Year	Category	Ref.
CNET	2012	Tech Car of the Year	
Popular Science	2012	Auto Grand Award Winner	
Automobile	2013	Automobile of the Year	
Motor Trend	2013	Car of the Year	
Natural Resources Canada	2013	EcoENERGY for Vehicles Awards (Note: For vehicles in the full-size category)	
World Car of the Year	2013	World Green Car of the Year	
Yahoo! Autos	2013	Car of the Year	
American Automobile Association	2014	Green Car Guide	
American Automobile Association	2015	Green Car Guide	
Motor Trend	2019	Ultimate Car of the Year (Note: The Ultimate Car of the Year award recognizes the most influential Car of the Year winner from the past 70 years.)	

== Bibliography ==
- Baer, Hans A.; Singer, Merrill (2024). Building the Critical Anthropology of Climate Change. Taylor & Francis. ISBN 978-1-0400-4617-3.
- Eisler, Matthew N. (2022). Age of Auto Electric. MIT Press. ISBN 978-0-2625-4457-3.
- Favaro, Brett (2017). The Carbon Code. Johns Hopkins University Press. ISBN 978-1-4214-2253-4.
- Fessler, David C. (2019). The Energy Disruption Triangle. John Wiley & Sons. ISBN 978-1-1193-4711-8.
- Fuller, Thomas F.; Harb, John N. (2018). Electrochemical Engineering. John Wiley & Sons. ISBN 978-1-1194-4658-3.
- Hayes, John G.; Goodarzi, G. Abas (2018). Electric Powertrain. John Wiley & Sons. ISBN 978-1-1190-6364-3.
- Johnston, Chris; Sobey, Ed (2022). The Arrival of the Electric Car. SAE International. ISBN 978-1-4686-0501-3.
- Kumar, Kundan; Devanshu, Ambrish; Dwivedi, Sanjeet K. (2024). Electric Vehicle Propulsion Drives and Charging Systems. CRC Press. ISBN 978-1-0400-3242-8.
- Martenson, Chris (2023). The Crash Course. John Wiley & Sons. ISBN 978-1-3941-6887-3.
- Vance, Ashlee (2016). Elon Musk: How the Billionaire CEO of SpaceX and Tesla is Shaping Our Future. Virgin Publishing. ISBN 978-0-7535-5752-5.
- Warner, John T. (2015). The Handbook of Lithium-Ion Battery Pack Design. Elsevier Science. ISBN 978-0-1280-1668-8.
- Warner, John T. (2024). The Handbook of Lithium-Ion Battery Pack Design. Elsevier Science. ISBN 978-0-4431-3808-9.
- Weber, Julian (2022). Moving Times. Springer Nature. ISBN 978-3-6583-7733-5.
- Zohuri, Bahman; Rahmani, Farhang Mossavar; Behgounia, Farahnaz (2022). Knowledge is Power in Four Dimensions: Models to Forecast Future Paradigm. Elsevier. ISBN 978-0-3239-5113-5.
