= Genital sex =

Genital sex may refer to:

- Sexual intercourse involving the genitals
- Sexual characteristics pertaining to the genitals
- Sex organ or genitalia

== See also ==
- Sex (disambiguation)
