= Sexual and Reproductive Health Matters =

- Discipline: Sexual and reproductive health and rights
- Language: English, translated in Arabic, Chinese, French, Hindi, Portuguese, Russian, Spanish
- Edited by: Dr Emma Pitchforth

Publication details
- Former name: Reproductive Health Matters
- History: 1993–present
- Publisher: Taylor and Francis (UK)
- Frequency: Biannually
- Open access: Yes
- Impact factor: 2.6 (2024)

Standard abbreviations
- ISO 4: Sex. Reprod. Health Matters

Indexing
- CODEN: RHMAFV
- ISSN: 0968-8080
- LCCN: 95640764
- OCLC no.: 231973069

Links
- Journal homepage

Sexual and Reproductive Health Matters (SRHM), formerly Reproductive Health Matters (RHM), is an organisation that promotes sexual and reproductive health and rights (SRHR) globally. SRHM's mission is to advance the creation and dissemination of sexual and reproductive health knowledge that is grounded in human rights and based on credible evidence, and to facilitate the transformation of such knowledge into action for improved SRHR. This mission is shaped by the understanding that rights- and evidence-based knowledge is power.

SRHM is the only global organisation linked to a scientific, highly reputed journal in the field of sexual and reproductive health that provides an independent voice, has a long-time, trusted reputation, and offers space to a truly global network of researchers, policy makers, programme managers, lawyers and activists in the field of sexual and reproductive health.

The SRHM journal, established in 1993, is an open-access, peer-reviewed academic journal. Founding director and editor Marge Berer, led RHM (in 2019, Reproductive Health Matters changed its name to Sexual and Reproductive Health Matters) since its inception until 2015 when she handed over responsibilities to Dr. Shirin Heidari, who transformed it into an open-access online journal. In 2018, Dr. Heidari handed over her responsibilities to Dr. Julia Hussein as editor-in-chief and Eszter Kismodi as chief executive. In 2020, after Julia announced her retirement, Dr. Emma Pitchforth took over the role of executive editor.

== Abstracting and indexing ==
The journal is abstracted and indexed in:

- Current Contents/Social & Behavioral Sciences
- MEDLINE/PubMed
- International Bibliography of the Social Sciences
- Embase
- Social Sciences Citation Index
- Sociological Abstracts
- Scopus

The journal has a 2021 impact factor of 5.732.

== See also ==
- Sex matters
