= All Bad Things Must End =

Single by Mötley Crüe
- Released: January 20, 2015
- Recorded: 2014
- Genre: Heavy metal
- Length: 3:07
- Label: Mötley
- Songwriter(s): Nikki Sixx; Mick Mars; James Michael; Tommy Lee
- Producer(s): Bob Rock

Mötley Crüe singles chronology
| "Sex" (2012) | "All Bad Things Must End" (2015) | "The Dirt (Est. 1981)" (2019) |

"All Bad Things Must End" is a song by American band Mötley Crüe, released as a single in January 2015. The song is about the internal forces threatening the band, and its intro features Nikki Sixx stating that the band "would rather just break up than be bland".

"We haven't ruled out the idea of a new album," Sixx said at the time. "We're proud of the songs 'Sex', 'Sick Love Song', 'All Bad Things'…"

== Music video ==
The song's video features clips of music videos, live footage, backstage footage, and other footage from the band since 1981. Nudity (including male nudity, albeit covered with a censor box) is shown, but a clean version is available. It also features the covers for all Crüe albums, except for their self-titled 1994 release, due to the absence of Vince Neil. However, it still includes the cover of 2000's New Tattoo, despite the absence of Tommy Lee.

== Personnel ==
=== Members ===
- Vince Neil - vocals
- Mick Mars - guitars
- Nikki Sixx - bass
- Tommy Lee - drums

=== Lyrics ===
- Nikki Sixx - composition
- Mick Mars - composition
- Tommy Lee - composition
- James Michael - composition

== Charts ==
| Chart (2015) | Peak position |
|---|---|
| US Mainstream Rock (Billboard) | 32 |
| Billboard Rock Digital Songs | 21 |
| Billboard Hard Rock Digital Songs | 3 |
