= Tesla facilities in Tilburg =

Overview of the several factory buildings of Tesla in Vossenberg, Tilburg, Netherlands

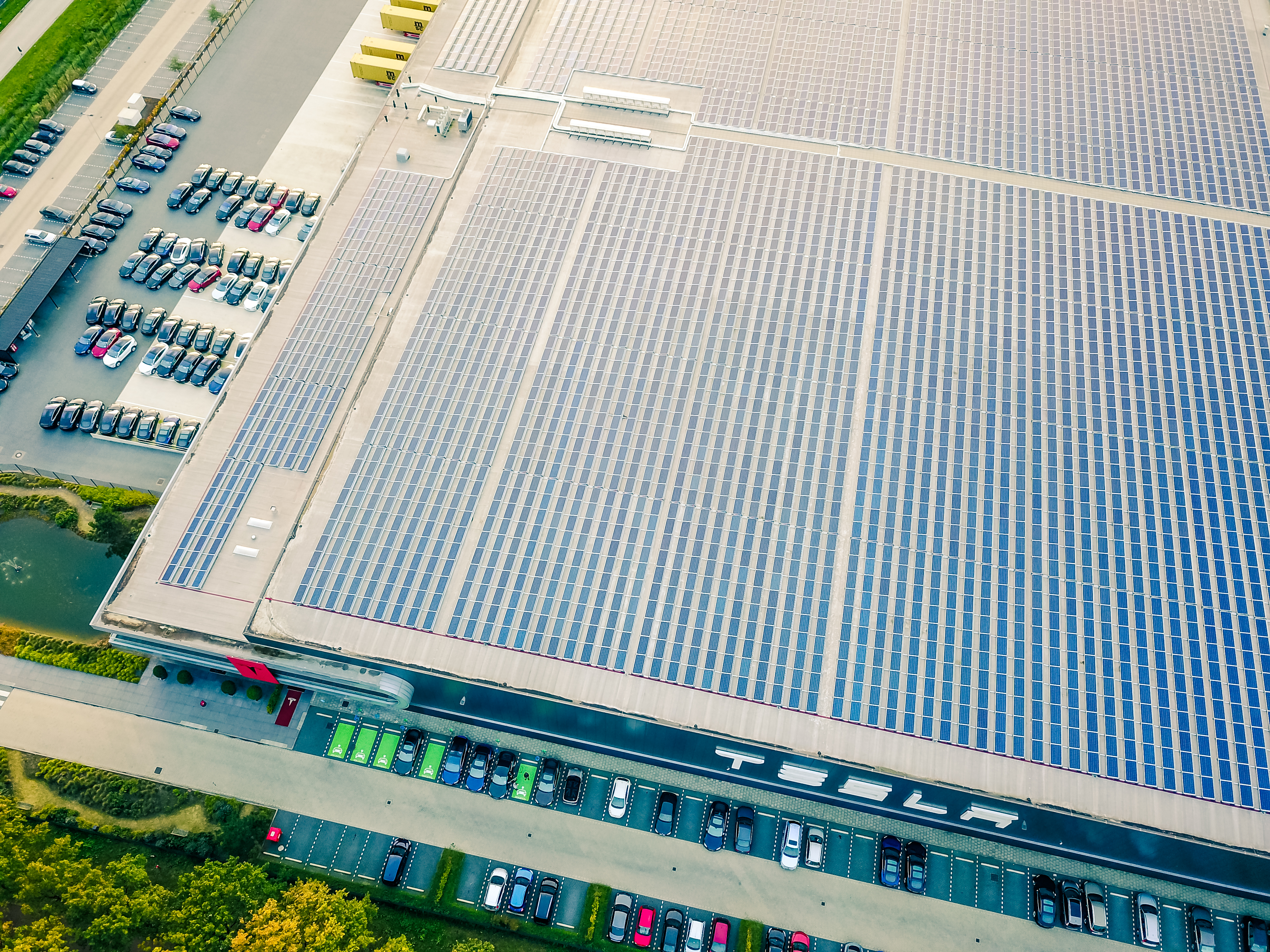
- Final assembly plant
- Location: Tilburg, Netherlands
- Coordinates: 51.606°N 5.003°E; 51.606°N 4.993°E; 51.601°N 5.017°E
- Buildings: 3
- Owner: Tesla, Inc.

Tesla, Inc. has several factory buildings in the industrial zone of Vossenberg, Tilburg, in the Netherlands. In December 2012, a European Distribution Centre in Tilburg was announced, acting as the European parts and services headquarters. The Tesla Tilburg assembly plant handled final assembly of Tesla Model S/X electric vehicles for delivery within Europe.

== Buildings ==
As of late 2018, Tesla has three factory buildings in the Vossenberg industrial area of Tilburg, 15 kilometres (10 mi) north of the Belgium–Netherlands border with a total floor area of 160,000 m^{2} (1,700,000 ft^{2}). The factory buildings are close to the Wilhelmina Canal, allowing for water-based delivery of intermodal containers arriving via the Port of Rotterdam.

=== European distribution centre ===
The first 18,900-square-metre (200,000 sq ft) Tesla facility started final assembly of Tesla Model S cars on 22 August 2013. It was Tesla's first factory outside California.

=== Final assembly plant ===
By late 2015, the assembly plant was in the process of doubling its capacity from 200 cars per week to 450 cars per week. The factory used for final assembly has a 3.4-megawatt rooftop photovoltaic power station. Vehicles arrived from the Tesla Fremont Factory in California as "gliders" with the interior fully fitted out. The battery pack and electric drivetrain components were shipped separately and installed into the unpowered vehicles in Tilburg. The factory building contains a 750-metre-long (2,460 ft) indoor test track with the back straight allowing speeds of 110 kilometres per hour (70 mph).

As of the 2021 S/X refresh, Tesla is no longer using this facility for S/X assembly.

=== Parts Distribution Centre & Warehouse ===
In mid-2018, Tesla took control of a third building with an area of 36,000 square metres (390,000 sq ft), approximately 1.2 kilometres (0.75 mi) east of the headquarters building. Now called the Tesla Global Parts Distribution Centre & Warehouse, the building had been certified by BREEAM as having a "very good" sustainability rating.

In October 2017, the original developers Ontwikkelingscombinatie Scheg had sold the nearly-completed building to Standard Life Aberdeen investment organisation.

== See also ==
- List of Tesla factories
