= Sex (Mötley Crüe song) =

Single by Mötley Crüe
- Released: July 17, 2012
- Recorded: 2012
- Genre: Hard rock
- Length: 3:41
- Label: Mötley
- Songwriters: Nikki Sixx; Mick Mars; James Michael; Tommy Lee
- Producer: James Michael

Mötley Crüe singles chronology
"White Trash Circus" (2009)	"Sex" (2012)	"All Bad Things Must End" (2015)

"Sex" is a song by American heavy metal band Mötley Crüe. It was originally thought to be the first single from their intended tenth studio album, but was disproved when bassist Nikki Sixx announced that there would not be another studio album before the end of their final tour.

== Personnel ==
=== Members ===
- Vince Neil: Lead vocal
- Nikki Sixx: Bass guitar
- Mick Mars: Guitars
- Tommy Lee: Drums

=== Lyrics ===
- Tommy Lee: Composer
- Mick Mars: Composer
- James Michael: Composer
- Nikki Sixx: Composer

== Charts ==
Chart (2012)	Peak position
Billboard Rock Digital Songs	36
Billboard Hard Rock Digital Songs	4
