= Sexuality (disambiguation) =

Human sexuality is the capacity to have erotic experiences and responses.

Sexuality may also refer to:

- In biology:
  - Animal sexuality
  - Plant sexuality
  - Sexuality of fungi
- Sexuality (orientation)
- Sexualities (journal), an academic journal
- Sexualities (book) a 2007 book edited by Nivedita Menon
- Sexuality (album), a 2008 album by Sébastien Tellier
- "Sexuality" (Billy Bragg song) (1991)
- "Sexuality" (Prince song) (1981)
- "Sexuality", a 1995 song by k.d. lang from All You Can Eat

== See also ==
- Biological sex
- Index of human sexuality articles
- Plant reproduction
- Sex (disambiguation)
- Sexual attractiveness
- Sexual identity
