= Cex =

Cex or CEX may refer to:

- A CEX exchange, not a Decentralized exchange
- Cex (musician), musical project run by Rjyan Claybrook Kidwell
- CeX (retailer), a second-hand retailer based in the UK
- Consumer Expenditure Survey, in the United States
