= List of Easter eggs in Tesla products =

Tesla products include a significant number of software and hardware Easter eggs among other unique software features, such as a suite of video games, emissions testing mode, and romance mode.

== Back to the Future phone app ==
Touching the battery icon inside the Tesla mobile app with the vehicle at exactly 121 miles (or 121 km) of range launches a Back to the Future Easter egg.

== Santa mode ==
Voice commands "Ho Ho Ho" or "Ho Ho Ho Not Funny" will activate the Santa Mode Easter egg. If voice command "Ho Ho Ho" is used, Run Rudolph Run by Chuck Berry will play inside of the vehicle.

== Mars, Mars rover and Starship ==
Tesla vehicles incorporate a Mars, Mars rover and Starship themed Easter egg. Upon activation, the GPS map on the touchscreen display shows the surface of Mars instead of the surface of the Earth.

== Mario Kart: Rainbow Road and Don't Fear the Reaper/SNL: More Cowbell ==
Autosteer capable vehicles with autosteer engaged can activate an Easter egg involving the in-car audio and a change in the on screen animation. If autopilot is activated four times in quick succession, the computer vision generated road that the car is driving on, denoted by two lines, will change into a rainbow which is similar to that of Rainbow Road, a track from the Mario Kart series of racing games. At the same time, a version of (Don't Fear) The Reaper by Blue Öyster Cult used for a Saturday Night Live sketch from 2000 plays in the cabin of the vehicle.

== Rainbow chargeport light ==
While the Tesla vehicle is plugged in, pushing the charge port control button on the charger handle 10 times quickly will activate the Easter egg.

== Monty Python ==
Tesla vehicles can play any Monty Python skit from their speakers.

== Model X Light Show and Trans-Siberian Orchestra ==
A Model X exclusive holiday light show is initiated by activating this Easter egg. The light show utilizes the headlights, fog lights and turn signals.

== James Bond – Lotus Esprit submarine ==
This Easter egg applies only to vehicles with the air suspension package. In the controls menu, under the suspension tab, the usual image of the Tesla is replaced by the submarine version of the Lotus Esprit that James Bond drove off a pier into the ocean in the movie The Spy Who Loved Me. A new "Depth (Leagues)" drop down menu appears next to the Esprit. The air suspension will raise and lower depending on the selected depth.

== Superbottle and Octovalve ==
Under the frunk of the Model 3, a component called the "superbottle" has been used to control many heating and cooling functions in the vehicle. Hidden on the "superbottle" is a caricature of a bottle as a superhero with a cape, muscular arms and legs, and a Tesla "T" logo on its front. "SUPERBOTTLE" in all caps also appears on the component.

== Spaceballs and Ludicrous+ ==
This Easter egg is included only in vehicles that feature the ludicrous mode option. The Easter egg is activated from the controls menu, by switching the software-controlled acceleration from "sport" to "ludicrous" and then tapping and holding the "ludicrous" text for 5 seconds. The screen will go black for a short time. A star field will swiftly appear and zoom forward, closely resembling a jump to ludicrous speed from the movie Spaceballs.

== Spinal Tap ==
As a nod to the movie This is Spinal Tap, volume and climate control fan settings go up to 11.

== Cybertruck in Camp Mode screensaver ==
Tesla vehicles may enter a mode called "camp mode". Several months after the release of "camp mode", a partly obscured Cybertruck was noticed in the background.

== Easter eggs in products that are not for sale ==
=== S3XY ===
At the top of the Tesla website are links to available Tesla models, the Model S, the Model 3, Model X, and the Model Y. Since the number 3 is similar to the letter E, this menu of links appears to spell out "SEX" ("S3X"), and with the Y included, "SEXY" ("S3XY"). The chronology of the cars is out of order, since the Model X began sales well before the Model 3. Based on the comments of Elon Musk it is well documented that the hidden message was purposeful.

=== Model Y teaser image ===
Before the reveal of the Tesla Model Y, a teaser image was released. Running it through an image editor and increasing the brightness revealed a message stating "NICE TRY."

== Removed and unreleased Easter eggs ==
=== Model S Team Photo ===
In previous software versions an "About your Tesla" menu could be accessed by tapping the Tesla "T" at the top of the touchscreen display. By tapping and holding the bottom right corner of the "About your Tesla" menu (the model designation number), the depicted Model S would zoom away and be replaced with a picture of the vehicle development team. After a 2020 update, the photo is no longer accessible.

=== Happy Birthday ===
In 2018, Elon Musk stated that the Tesla Model X would be able to play a version of Happy Birthday performed by Marilyn Monroe.

== Hoax Easter eggs ==
=== The Tesla beating heart ===
On November 17, 2018, Joel Paglione made a post to Imgur claiming that if both charge port-like panels are pushed at the same time, which looks like one is awkwardly hugging the back of the car, a second charge port opens up on the right side of the car and a pulsing/beating red heart light is displayed. This Easter egg was determined to be a complete fabrication.

== See also ==
- List of Easter eggs in Microsoft products
- List of Google Easter eggs
