= Live: Entertainment or Death =

Live album by Mötley Crüe
- Released: November 23, 1999
- Recorded: 1982–1999
- Genre: Heavy metal; hard rock
- Length: 97:39
- Label: Mötley
- Producer: Mötley Crüe

Mötley Crüe chronology
Supersonic and Demonic Relics (1999)	Live: Entertainment or Death (1999)	New Tattoo (2000)

Professional ratings
Review scores
Source	Rating
AllMusic	2.5/5 stars
Entertainment Weekly	A−
Kerrang!	3/5 stars
The Rolling Stone Album Guide	2.5/5 stars

Live: Entertainment or Death is the first official live album by American heavy metal band Mötley Crüe. Released on November 23, 1999, it is a compilation of recordings from 1982 to 1999. However, it contains no songs from the band's 1994 album Mötley Crüe, nor 1997's Generation Swine. "We picked the stuff that sounded the best without having to touch it up," Nikki Sixx observed in 2000. "We still play some of those songs [from Generation Swine] in the set; they just didn't make the final tracklisting."

The album charted at number 133 on the Billboard 200.

== Controversy ==
In a review of the album at the time of its release, hard rock/heavy metal website Metal Sludge revealed that vocals on a small percentage of the tracks had been "redone" or "touched up" in the studio, calling into question how much of the record was a genuine live document. The website provided dates and suggested that side-by-side audio comparisons to bootlegs from shows from which the tracks for the album were culled form the basis for their claim. Mötley Crüe remained silent on the issue.

== Track listing ==
All tracks are written by Nikki Sixx, except where noted.

Disc 1
No.	Title	Writer(s)	Recording date	Length
1.	"Looks That Kill"		November 25, 1985	6:06
2.	"Knock 'Em Dead, Kid"	Sixx; Vince Neil	March 14, 1984	3:35
3.	"Too Young to Fall in Love"		March 14, 1984	3:57
4.	"Live Wire"		March 14, 1984	4:19
5.	"Public Enemy #1"	Sixx; Lizzie Grey	November 19, 1982	4:53
6.	"Shout at the Devil"		March 14, 1984	4:19
7.	"Merry-Go-Round"		November 19, 1982	3:22
8.	"Ten Seconds to Love"	Sixx; Neil	December 2, 1998	4:46
9.	"Piece of Your Action"	Sixx; Neil	November 19, 1982	4:06
10.	"Starry Eyes"		November 19, 1982	4:37
11.	"Helter Skelter"	Lennon–McCartney	November 19, 1982	4:17

Disc 2/Enhanced CD
No.	Title	Writer(s)	Recording date	Length
1.	"Smokin' in the Boys Room"	Cub Koda; Michael Lutz	November 25, 1985	5:18
2.	"Don't Go Away Mad (Just Go Away)"	Sixx; Mick Mars	July 31, 1990	4:14
3.	"Wild Side"	Sixx; Tommy Lee; Neil	March 10, 1999	5:52
4.	"Girls, Girls, Girls"	Sixx; Lee; Mars	December 2, 1998	4:50
5.	"Dr. Feelgood"	Sixx; Mars	March 10, 1999	5:13
6.	"Without You"	Sixx; Mars	July 31, 1990	3:05
7.	"Primal Scream"		December 2, 1998	5:42
8.	"Same Ol' Situation (S.O.S.)"	Sixx; Lee; Neil; Mars	March 10, 1999	4:33
9.	"Home Sweet Home"	Sixx; Lee	December 2, 1998	4:06
10.	"Kickstart My Heart"		March 10, 1999	5:39

Enhanced CD bonus track
No.	Title	Writer(s)	Recording date	Length
11.	"Wild Side" (video)	Sixx; Lee; Neil	March 10, 1999	4:56

== Personnel ==
- Vince Neil – vocals; guitar ("Don't Go Away Mad (Just Go Away)" and "Same Ol' Situation (S.O.S.)")
- Mick Mars – lead guitar
- Nikki Sixx – bass
- Tommy Lee – drums, piano ("Home Sweet Home")
