= From the Beginning (Mötley Crüe album) =

Compilation album by Mötley Crüe
- Released: September 12, 2025
- Recorded: 1981–2025
- Genre: Heavy metal; glam metal; hard rock
- Length: 78:01 (CD); 87:02 (LP)
- Label: BMG

Mötley Crüe chronology
Cancelled (2024)	From the Beginning (2025)

Singles from From the Beginning
- 1. "Home Sweet Home (feat. Dolly Parton)" Released: June 21, 2025

From the Beginning is a compilation album by American heavy metal band Mötley Crüe, released through BMG Rights Management on September 12, 2025, on CD, LP, and digital formats. It features a selection of the band's hit songs from their discography, plus a remix of their 1985 single "Home Sweet Home" featuring Dolly Parton.

== Track listing ==
=== CD version ===
No.	Title	Writer(s)	Original release	Length
1.	"Live Wire"	Nikki Sixx	Too Fast for Love (1981)	3:16
2.	"Take Me to the Top"	Sixx	Too Fast for Love	3:44
3.	"Shout at the Devil" (2021 remaster)	Sixx	Shout at the Devil (1983)	3:16
4.	"Looks That Kill" (2021 remaster)	Sixx	Shout at the Devil	4:08
5.	"Too Young to Fall in Love" (2021 remaster)	Sixx	Shout at the Devil	3:37
6.	"Smokin' in the Boys Room" (2021 remaster)	Cub Koda; Michael Lutz	Theatre of Pain (1985)	3:28
7.	"Home Sweet Home" (2021 remaster)	Sixx; Tommy Lee	Theatre of Pain	4:01
8.	"Girls, Girls, Girls"	Sixx; Lee; Mick Mars	Girls, Girls, Girls (1987)	4:30
9.	"Wild Side"	Sixx; Mars; Vince Neil	Girls, Girls, Girls	4:41
10.	"Dr. Feelgood"	Sixx; Mars	Dr. Feelgood (1989)	4:50
11.	"Without You"	Sixx; Mars	Dr. Feelgood	4:30
12.	"Kickstart My Heart"	Sixx	Dr. Feelgood	4:44
13.	"Don't Go Away Mad (Just Go Away)"	Sixx; Mars	Dr. Feelgood	4:41
14.	"Same Ol' Situation (S.O.S.)"	Sixx; Lee; Neil; Mars	Dr. Feelgood	4:14
15.	"Primal Scream"	Sixx; Lee; Neil; Mars	Decade of Decadence 81–91 (1991)	4:46
16.	"The Dirt (Est. 1981)" (featuring Machine Gun Kelly)	Sixx; John Lowery; Sahaj Ticotin; Colson Baker; Lee; Mars; Neil	The Dirt Soundtrack (2019)	3:51
17.	"Saints of Los Angeles"	Sixx; James Michael; DJ Ashba; Marti Frederiksen	Saints of Los Angeles (2008)	3:39
18.	"Dogs of War"	Sixx; Lee; Lowery	Cancelled (2024)	4:04
19.	"Home Sweet Home" (featuring Dolly Parton)	Sixx; Lee	New recording	4:01
Total length:				78:01

=== LP version ===
Side A
No.	Title	Writer(s)	Original release	Length
1.	"Live Wire"	Sixx	Too Fast for Love	3:16
2.	"Take Me to the Top"	Sixx	Too Fast for Love	3:44
3.	"Shout at the Devil" (2021 remaster)	Sixx	Shout at the Devil	3:16
4.	"Looks That Kill" (2021 remaster)	Sixx	Shout at the Devil	4:08
5.	"Too Young to Fall in Love" (2021 remaster)	Sixx	Shout at the Devil	3:37
6.	"Smokin' in the Boys Room" (2021 remaster)	Koda; Lutz	Theatre of Pain	3:28

Side B
No.	Title	Writer(s)	Original release	Length
1.	"Home Sweet Home" (2021 remaster)	Sixx; Lee	Theatre of Pain	4:01
2.	"Girls, Girls, Girls"	Sixx; Lee; Mars	Girls, Girls, Girls	4:30
3.	"Wild Side"	Sixx; Mars; Neil	Girls, Girls, Girls	4:41
4.	"Dr. Feelgood"	Sixx; Mars	Dr. Feelgood	4:50
5.	"Without You"	Sixx; Mars	Dr. Feelgood	4:30

Side C
No.	Title	Writer(s)	Original release	Length
1.	"Kickstart My Heart"	Sixx	Dr. Feelgood	4:44
2.	"Don't Go Away Mad (Just Go Away)"	Sixx; Mars	Dr. Feelgood	4:41
3.	"Same Ol' Situation (S.O.S.)"	Sixx; Lee; Neil; Mars	Dr. Feelgood	4:14
4.	"Primal Scream"	Sixx; Lee; Neil; Mars	Decade of Decadence 81–91	4:46
5.	"Afraid"	Sixx	Generation Swine (1997)	4:09

Side D
No.	Title	Writer(s)	Original release	Length
1.	"Saints of Los Angeles"	Sixx; Michael; Ashba; Frederiksen	Saints of Los Angeles	3:39
2.	"The Dirt (Est. 1981)" (featuring Machine Gun Kelly)	Sixx; Lowery; Ticotin; Baker; Lee; Mars; Neil	The Dirt Soundtrack	3:51
3.	"Dogs of War"	Sixx; Lee; Lowery	Cancelled	4:04
4.	"Cancelled"	Sixx; Lee; Lowery	Cancelled	4:52
5.	"Home Sweet Home" (featuring Dolly Parton)	Sixx; Lee	New recording	4:01
Total length:				87:02

== Personnel ==
Mötley Crüe

- Vince Neil – lead vocals
- Nikki Sixx – bass, backing vocals
- Tommy Lee – drums, piano on "Home Sweet Home", backing vocals
- Mick Mars – guitar, backing vocals
- John 5 – guitar on "Dogs of War" and "Cancelled"

== Charts ==
Chart performance for From the Beginning
Chart (2025)	Peak position
French Rock & Metal Albums (SNEP)	20
Japanese Rock Albums (Oricon)	16
Japanese Western Albums (Oricon)	17
Japanese Top Albums Sales (Billboard Japan)	63
Scottish Albums (OCC)	37
Swedish Physical Albums (Sverigetopplistan)	8
Swiss Albums (Schweizer Hitparade)	35
UK Albums Sales (OCC)	35
UK Independent Albums (OCC)	14
UK Rock & Metal Albums (OCC)	4
US Billboard 200	163
US Independent Albums (Billboard)	25
US Top Rock & Alternative Albums (Billboard)	40
