= New Tattoo =

Studio album by Mötley Crüe
- Released: July 11, 2000
- Recorded: March–June 2000
- Studios: Cello Studios (Hollywood, California); Can Am (Tarzana, California)
- Genres: Heavy metal; glam metal
- Length: 43:22
- Labels: Mötley; Beyond Music
- Producer: Mike Clink

Mötley Crüe chronology
Live: Entertainment or Death (1999)	New Tattoo (2000)	Music to Crash Your Car To: Vol. 1 (2003)

Singles from New Tattoo
- 1. "Hell on High Heels" Released: 2000; 2. "New Tattoo" Released: 2000; 3. "Treat Me Like the Dog I Am" Released: 2000 (promo)

Professional ratings
Review scores
Source	Rating
AllMusic	3/5 stars
The Daily Vault	B+
Entertainment Weekly	D+
Metal Forces	7.5/10
Orlando Weekly	unfavorable
People	unfavorable
Rolling Stone	2.5/5 stars
The Rolling Stone Album Guide	2/5 stars

New Tattoo is the eighth studio album by the American heavy metal band Mötley Crüe, released in 2000. Artistically, New Tattoo shows the band returning to the earlier musical style that gave them commercial success in the 1980s and early 1990s. This is the only album by the band not to feature drummer Tommy Lee, who left the band a year before, and was replaced by former Ozzy Osbourne drummer Randy Castillo on the album. The album was Castillo’s final full-length studio recording project that he was involved in before his death in March 2002.

== Background ==
The original line up of Mötley Crüe, which consisted of singer Vince Neil, bassist Nikki Sixx, drummer Tommy Lee and guitarist Mick Mars, had reunited for the Generation Swine album and tour in 1997, mainly out of pressure from their management and record company. Even though the group had reunited, problems still existed between Lee and Neil, as Lee felt that the band had been going in a backward direction since Neil rejoined the group. Lee was having domestic problems with his wife, model Pamela Anderson, which, after an altercation following an argument, led to him serving time in jail.

During this time, Mötley Crüe and Elektra Records severed their 17-year relationship together, with Mötley Crüe gaining full ownership of its music catalog and publishing rights. The break with Elektra allowed the group to form its own label, Mötley Records, to release future projects on.

Lee's legal problems forced the band to decline invitations from Ozzfest and various radio festivals, though the band managed to record two new songs for their 1998 Greatest Hits album, "Bitter Pill" and "Enslaved," which were more in the style of their 1980's output than their 1990's work.

While Lee was in jail, he decided that he was going to leave Mötley Crüe and start his own project, which eventually became Methods of Mayhem. Lee stayed with the group for the tour of their greatest hits album, but after each show he would retreat to his portable studio and work on material for his new project. With Lee out of the band, the band hired Randy Castillo, who had previously performed with Lita Ford and Ozzy Osbourne, as his replacement.

== Recording ==
Mötley Crüe teamed up with producer Mike Clink to record the album that Sixx felt should have been the successor to their 1989 album, Dr. Feelgood.

Longtime guitarist Mick Mars claims he had little actual involvement in New Tattoo, stating that his bandmates denied him the chance to participate due to lingering bad feelings from the recording of Generation Swine. "I didn't write any of those songs, since I wasn't invited," said Mars. "I think I played one lick on that album."

== Release ==
New Tattoo debuted at No. 41 on the Billboard 200 and slid down shortly after. According to Nielsen SoundScan, the album has sold about 203,000 copies in the U.S. to date. The songs "Hell on High Heels", which featured a music video and charted at number 13 on the Mainstream rock charts, "New Tattoo" and "Treat Me Like the Dog I Am" were released as singles for the album.

== Touring and aftermath ==
Right before the tour in support of the album, Castillo fell ill with a duodenal ulcer. Hole drummer Samantha Maloney filled in for the tour. While recovering from stomach surgery, Castillo was diagnosed with Squamous cell Carcinoma. After Castillo's death in March 2002, Mötley Crüe went on hiatus until their 2004 reunion, with Tommy Lee back in the fold.

None of the songs from the album were played live again after the tour ended; With the exception of one performance of "White Punks on Dope" in 2005, and was played each night with a mashup of cover songs on the 2022 stadium tour.

== Track listing ==
All tracks are written by Nikki Sixx and James Michael, except where noted.

No.	Title	Lyrics	Music	Length
1.	"Hell on High Heels"	Sixx	Sixx; Mick Mars; Vince Neil	4:15
2.	"Treat Me Like the Dog I Am"			3:40
3.	"New Tattoo"		Mars; Sixx; Michael	4:18
4.	"Dragstrip Superstar"			4:22
5.	"1st Band on the Moon"	Sixx	Sixx	4:25
6.	"She Needs Rock & Roll"			3:59
7.	"Punched in the Teeth by Love"	Sixx	Mars; Sixx; Neil; Randy Castillo	3:32
8.	"Hollywood Ending"			3:43
9.	"Fake"			3:44
10.	"Porno Star"	Sixx	Sixx	3:45
11.	"White Punks on Dope" (The Tubes cover)	Michael Evans; Bill Spooner; Roger Steen	Evans; Spooner; Steen	3:39
Total length:				43:22

European edition bonus track
No.	Title	Lyrics	Music	Length
12.	"Timebomb"	Sixx	Mars; Sixx; Neil; Castillo	4:38
Total length:				48:00

Japanese edition bonus tracks
No.	Title	Writer(s)	Length
12.	"1st Band on the Moon" (demo version)	Sixx	4:33
13.	"Porno Star" (demo version)	Sixx

2003 Remastered edition bonus tracks
No.	Title	Length
12.	"1st Band on the Moon" (demo version)	4:33
13.	"Porno Star" (demo version)	6:29
14.	"Hell on High Heels" (video)	13:51

Live in Salt Lake City (bonus disc)
No.	Title	Writer(s)	Length
1.	"Kickstart My Heart" (live)	Sixx	7:21
2.	"Same Ol' Situation (S.O.S.)" (live)	Sixx; Tommy Lee (music); Mars (music); Neil (music)	4:53
3.	"Dr. Feelgood" (live)	Sixx; Mars (music)	5:17
4.	"Hell on High Heels" (live)	Sixx; Mars (music); Neil (music)	4:20
5.	"Live Wire" (live)	Sixx	4:42
6.	"White Punks on Dope" (live)	Evans; Spooner; Steen	4:13

== Lewd, Crüed & Tattooed DVD ==
Lewd, Crüed & Tattooed is a Mötley Crüe concert DVD released in 2001, the concert was recorded live in Salt Lake City on their 2000 tour supporting the "New Tattoo" album. The DVD includes behind the scenes footage and the music video for the single "Hell on High Heels".

=== DVD Track listing ===
1. "Kickstart My Heart"
2. "Same Ol' Situation (S.O.S.)"
3. "Primal Scream"
4. "Punched in the Teeth by Love"
5. "Dr. Feelgood"
6. "Home Sweet Home"
7. "Don't Go Away Mad (Just Go Away)"
8. "Piece of Your Action"
9. "Wild Side"
10. "Hell on High Heels"
11. "Looks That Kill"
12. "Girls, Girls, Girls"
13. "Live Wire"
14. "White Punks on Dope"
15. "Shout at the Devil '97"
16. "Hell on High Heels" (music video)

== Personnel ==
Mötley Crüe

- Vince Neil – lead vocals, additional guitar on "Same Ol' Situation (S.O.S.)" and "Don't Go Away Mad (Just Go Away)"
- Mick Mars – guitar, backing vocals
- Nikki Sixx – bass, backing vocals
- Randy Castillo – drums

Additional musicians

- Samantha Maloney – drums (live disc only)

Production

- Mike Clink – producer, engineer, mixing at Sol Seven Recording and A&M Studios
- Ed Thacker – engineer, mixing
- Billy Kinsley, Ethan Mates, Jon Krupp, Jaime Sickora, Frank Montoya – assistant engineers
- Tal Herzberg, Rail Rogut, Karl Derfler – digital editing
- Dave Collins – mastering

Artwork

- Erik Casillas – cover art
- Susan McEowen – art direction
- Jim Purdum – photography

== Charts ==
=== Album ===
Chart (2000)	Peak position
Japanese Albums (Oricon)	17
UK Rock & Metal Albums (Official Charts)	14
US Billboard 200	41

=== Singles ===
Year	Title	Chart	Position
2000	"Hell on High Heels"	Mainstream Rock (USA)	13

== Certifications ==
DVD

Region	Certification	Certified units/sales
Australia (ARIA)	Platinum	15,000^{^}
United States (RIAA)	Gold	50,000^{^}
^{^} Shipments figures based on certification alone.
