= The Tour (Kiss and Mötley Crüe) =

2012–2013 concert tour by Kiss and Mötley Crüe

- Tour by Kiss & Mötley Crüe
- Promotional poster for the tour
- Start date: July 20, 2012
- End date: October 1, 2012
- No. of shows: 44
Kiss tour chronology
The Hottest Show on Earth Tour (2010–2011)	The Tour (2012)	Monster World Tour (2012–2013)
Mötley Crüe tour chronology
UK Def Leppard/Mötley Crüe (2011)	The Tour (2012)	North American Tour (2013)

The Tour was a co-headlining summer tour between American hard rock and heavy metal bands Kiss and Mötley Crüe. The tour, described as "Elvis on steroids" by Paul Stanley, was announced on March 20 and started on July 20, 2012 in Bristow, Virginia. At first, 40 dates were announced while the August 5 concert at AT&T Center and the August 1 concert at KFC Yum! Center were subsequently added. "The Tour" was listed by the Rolling Stone as one of "The Ten Hottest Summer Package Tours of 2012". The Treatment was the opening act for all shows.

In the tour program for Kiss' final tour, Singer reflected on the tour:

Chemistry is a unique thing. Bands are like soup: Sometimes when you change the ingredients, even though it's still chicken soup, you put a little more chicken stock or vegetable it changes the flavor. To me, I think the flavor of Kiss has a pretty good taste to it. We have the unique ingredients to it like some of the old tried-and-true original sound but we also have some zestiness and spice that Tommy and I provide with the ability to basically play any songs that are required. I think the fact that Tommy and I have a history of being weaned on Kiss is something we bring to the table that helps the band retain some of its vintage sound. We try to keep the essence and the vibe of the original songs in there but there's still a little bit of an extra twist that we give it. We give it a little bit more horsepower.

== Set lists ==
=== Mötley Crüe ===
1. "Saints of Los Angeles"
2. "Wild Side"
3. "Shout at the Devil"
4. "Same Ol' Situation (S.O.S.)"
5. "Sex"
6. "Don't Go Away Mad (Just Go Away)"
7. "Home Sweet Home" (Tommy Lee's drum solo)
8. "Live Wire" (Mick Mars guitar solo)
9. "Primal Scream"
10. "Dr. Feelgood"
11. "Girls, Girls, Girls"
12. "Kickstart My Heart"
- "Looks That Kill" was played until July 22.

=== Kiss ===
Main Set

1. "Detroit Rock City"
2. "Shout It Out Loud"
3. "I Love It Loud"
4. "Firehouse" (Gene breathes fire)
5. "Hell or Hallelujah"
6. "War Machine"
7. "Shock Me" (Tommy and Eric Jam)
8. "God of Thunder" (Gene spits blood)
9. "Love Gun" (Paul flies to b stage)
10. "Lick It Up"
11. "Black Diamond"

Encore

12. "I Was Made For Lovin' You" (played in Mexico City)
13. Random Song
14. "Rock and Roll All Nite"

Set list 2

1. "Detroit Rock City"
2. "Shout It Out Loud"
3. "I Love It Loud"
4. "Firehouse" (Gene breathes fire)
5. "Love Gun" (Paul flies to b stage)
6. "War Machine"
7. "Shock Me" (Tommy and Eric Jam)
8. "Hell or Hallelujah"
9. "God of Thunder" (Gene spits blood)
10. "Lick It Up"
11. "Black Diamond"

Encore

12. "Rock and Roll All Nite"

Random Songs

- "Deuce"
- "Calling Dr. Love"
- "Cold Gin"
- "C'mon and Love Me"
- "Hotter Than Hell"
- "Strutter"
- "Got to Choose"
- "Do You Love Me?"
- "Crazy Crazy Nights"
- "Makin' Love"

== Tour dates ==
Date	City	Country	Venue
July 20, 2012	Bristow	United States	Jiffy Lube Live
July 21, 2012	Virginia Beach	United States	Farm Bureau Live at Virginia Beach
July 22, 2012	Raleigh	United States	Time Warner Cable Music Pavilion
July 24, 2012	Atlanta	United States	Aaron's Amphitheatre at Lakewood
July 25, 2012	Charlotte	United States	Verizon Wireless Amphitheatre
July 27, 2012	West Palm Beach	United States	Cruzan Amphitheatre
July 28, 2012	Tampa	United States	1-800-ASK-GARY Amphitheatre
July 31, 2012	Pelham	United States	Oak Mountain Amphitheater
August 1, 2012	Louisville	United States	KFC Yum! Center
August 3, 2012	The Woodlands	United States	Cynthia Woods Mitchell Pavilion
August 4, 2012	Dallas	United States	Gexa Energy Pavilion
August 5, 2012	San Antonio	United States	AT&T Center
August 7, 2012	Albuquerque	United States	Journal Pavilion
August 8, 2012	Greenwood Village	United States	Comfort Dental Amphitheatre
August 10, 2012	Phoenix	United States	Ashley Furniture HomeStore Pavilion
August 11, 2012	Las Vegas	United States	Mandalay Bay Events Center
August 12, 2012	Chula Vista	United States	Cricket Wireless Amphitheatre
August 14, 2012	Irvine	United States	Verizon Wireless Amphitheater
August 16, 2012	Concord	United States	Sleep Train Pavilion
August 18, 2012	Auburn	United States	White River Amphitheatre
August 19, 2012	Ridgefield	United States	Sleep Country Amphitheater
August 24, 2012	Grand Junction	United States	Rock Jam
August 26, 2012	Tulsa	United States	BOK Center
August 27, 2012	Maryland Heights	United States	Verizon Wireless Amphitheater
August 29, 2012	St. Paul	United States	Minnesota State Fair
August 31, 2012	Cincinnati	United States	Riverbend Music Center
September 1, 2012	Noblesville	United States	Klipsch Music Center
September 2, 2012	Burgettstown	United States	First Niagara Pavilion
September 4, 2012	Nashville	United States	Bridgestone Arena
September 6, 2012	Clarkston	United States	DTE Energy Music Theatre
September 7, 2012	Tinley Park	United States	First Midwest Bank Amphitheatre
September 8, 2012	East Troy	United States	Alpine Valley Music Theatre
September 11, 2012	Allegan	United States	Allegan County Fair
September 12, 2012	Cuyahoga Falls	United States	Blossom Music Center
September 13, 2012	Toronto	Canada	Molson Amphitheatre
September 15, 2012	Darien	United States	Darien Lake Performing Arts Center
September 16, 2012	Mansfield	United States	Comcast Center
September 18, 2012	Scranton	United States	Toyota Pavilion
September 19, 2012	Camden	United States	Susquehanna Bank Center
September 21, 2012	Holmdel	United States	PNC Bank Arts Center
September 22, 2012	Wantagh	United States	Nikon at Jones Beach Theater
September 23, 2012	Hartford	United States	Comcast Theatre
September 29, 2012	Mexico City	Mexico	Foro Sol
October 1, 2012	Monterrey	Mexico	Arena Monterrey

== Personnel ==
=== Kiss ===
- Paul Stanley – vocals, rhythm guitar
- Gene Simmons – vocals, bass
- Tommy Thayer – lead guitar, vocals
- Eric Singer – drums, vocals

Staff

- Francis Stueber - introduction voice

=== Mötley Crüe ===
- Vince Neil – lead vocals, rhythm guitar
- Mick Mars – guitar, backing vocals
- Nikki Sixx – bass, backing vocals
- Tommy Lee – drums, backing vocals
