= Nashville Outlaws: A Tribute to Mötley Crüe =

Studio album by various artists
- Released: August 19, 2014
- Genres: Country; heavy metal
- Length: 62:20
- Label: Big Machine
- Producers: Big & Rich; Darrell Brown; Trey Bruce; Dann Huff; Raul Malo; Joey Moi; Justin Niebank; Rascal Flatts; LeAnn Rimes; Frank Rogers; Jeremy Stover; Gretchen Wilson

Singles from Nashville Outlaws: A Tribute to Mötley Crüe
- 1. "Home Sweet Home" Released: July 7, 2014

Nashville Outlaws: A Tribute to Mötley Crüe is a 2014 studio album released via Big Machine Records. It is a tribute album to the heavy metal band Mötley Crüe, featuring covers of their songs performed by various country music artists. The album's lead single is a cover of "Home Sweet Home", recorded by Justin Moore as a duet with Mötley Crüe lead singer Vince Neil.

== Critical reception ==
Stephen Thomas Erlewine of Allmusic rated it 2.5 stars out of 5, saying that "Maybe it doesn't hold together but, then again, there never was a clear pathway for this tribute to proceed anyway. The Crüe and country may share some common ground, but it's ungainly and only intermittently appealing, as this odd record makes clear." He praised the performances of LeAnn Rimes, The Mavericks, and Aaron Lewis. Jon Freeman of Country Weekly rated the album "B", praising the Mavericks' cover of "Dr. Feelgood" as the strongest track, as well as the performances by Moore, Rascal Flatts, Eli Young Band, and Gretchen Wilson. He found Aaron Lewis's cover of "Afraid" the most country-sounding, but criticized the performances of Cassadee Pope, Clare Bowen and Sam Palladio, and Big & Rich. Rolling Stone reviewer Nick Murray gave the album 2 out of 5 stars, with his review saying that "Unfortunately, few of the 15 featured artists do anything more than rehash their assigned song – often omitting even the slight twang Nashville usually requires." He also thought that the performances of LeAnn Rimes and The Mavericks were the strongest.

== Commercial performance ==
The album debuted on the Billboard 200 at No. 5, and the Top Country Albums chart at No. 2, with sales of 31,000 in the U.S. As of September 2014, the album has sold 55,000 copies in the U.S.

In Canada, the album debuted at number six on the Canadian Albums Chart, selling 2,700 copies in its first week.

== Track listing ==
Standard edition
No.	Title	Writer(s)	Artist	Length
1.	"Kickstart My Heart"	Nikki Sixx	Rascal Flatts	3:55
2.	"If I Die Tomorrow"	Simple Plan, Sixx	Florida Georgia Line	3:41
3.	"Smokin' in the Boys Room (Note: The Mötley Crüe song covered by Rimes is in turn a cover of the 1973 Brownsville Station hit)"	Cub Koda, Michael Lutz	LeAnn Rimes	4:51
4.	"Home Sweet Home"	Tommy Lee, Vince Neil	Justin Moore with Vince Neil	3:51
5.	"The Animal in Me"	Sixx, Mick Mars, James Michael, Marti Frederiksen	Cassadee Pope with Robin Zander	4:12
6.	"Afraid"	Sixx	Aaron Lewis	3:52
7.	"Same Ol' Situation (S.O.S.)"	Lee, Mars, Neil, Sixx	Big & Rich	4:22
8.	"Without You"	Mars, Sixx	Clare Bowen with Sam Palladio	3:28
9.	"Don't Go Away Mad (Just Go Away)"	Mars, Sixx	Eli Young Band	3:57
10.	"Looks That Kill"	Sixx	Lauren Jenkins	4:32
11.	"Live Wire"	Sixx	The Cadillac Three	4:07
12.	"Dr. Feelgood"	Mars, Sixx	The Mavericks	5:13
13.	"Girls, Girls, Girls"	Lee, Mars, Sixx	Brantley Gilbert	4:05
14.	"Wild Side"	Lee, Neil, Sixx	Gretchen Wilson	4:41
15.	"Time for Change"	Sixx, Donna McDaniel	Darius Rucker	3:33
Total length:				62:11

Extended edition
No.	Title	Writer(s)	Artist	Length
16.	"Home Sweet Home" (single edit)	Lee, Neil	Justin Moore with Vince Neil	3:23
17.	"Home Sweet Home" (live)	Lee, Neil	Justin Moore	4:02
Total length:				69:36

10th Anniversary edition
No.	Title	Writer(s)	Artist	Length
1.	"Dogs of War"	John Lowery, Sixx, Lee	Chase McDaniel	4:03
Total length:				73:39

== Chart performance ==
=== Weekly charts ===
Chart (2014)	Peak position
Canadian Albums (Billboard)	6
US Billboard 200	5
US Top Country Albums (Billboard)	2

=== Year-end charts ===
Chart (2014)	Position
US Top Country Albums (Billboard)	57
