= Hell on High Heels =

2000 single by Mötley Crüe

Single by Mötley Crüe

from the album New Tattoo
- Released: 2000
- Recorded: 2000
- Genre: Glam metal, hard rock
- Length: 4:15 (album version) 3:53 (radio edit)
- Label: Mötley
- Songwriters: Mick Mars, Vince Neil, Nikki Sixx

Mötley Crüe singles chronology
"Teaser" (1999)	"Hell on High Heels" (2000)	"New Tattoo" (2000)

"Hell on High Heels" is a single by the American heavy metal band Mötley Crüe, released as the first single on their 2000 album New Tattoo. The song charted at number 13 on the Mainstream rock charts. This is Mötley Crüe's first single with Randy Castillo on drums.

== Music video ==
This is the first animated Mötley Crüe video, and was directed by Bob Cesca at his Flash animation studio Camp Chaos, best known for the Napster Bad! cartoons from earlier that year, which lampooned the Metallica v. Napster, Inc. lawsuit. Mötley Crüe also starred in a Camp Chaos-created response cartoon calling out Metallica for the lawsuit, while also promoting their Maximum Rock 2000 Tour and an advance single release for "Hell On High Heels".

The music video starts off with the words "Mötley Crüe's history of mankind" in the sky, it then pans down to a scene which features Nikki Sixx holding a sign that says "20,000 B.C." and a caveman eating a fish, then throws the fish at a cavewoman, causing the two to have sex. Next, Mick Mars holds a sign that says "Buy-A-Wench-Day, 79 AD" which features an Ancient Roman man who falls in love with a sexy woman who turns into the devil. Then the cavewoman drops a boulder on the caveman's head as blood splatters. As the first chorus starts, the woman changes into herself and to the devil. Mick Mars gives the devil woman a cigarette that has the caveman and the Roman Guy. Randy Castillo appears with a sign saying "Saigon 1969". A soldier having a nap on the beach falls off his chair and is about to fire his gun. He sees a pretty woman and gives her a $20 bill. Vince Neil appears holding a sign with "Washington D.C. Present Day." A woman waits in front of the Whitehouse. She sees the president's car, she walks in and sits beside the president and he laughs at her underpants down. She takes the president's pants off. Then the soldier and the woman from the beach scene have sex as the soldier smokes. The woman puts a grenade in his mouth and the beach cabin blows up. Towards the end of the video, the devil woman kills all the band members and mounts their heads. At the end of the video, all the band members' bodies disappear. The video was banned from MTV because of its gory content and the scenes where the devil woman is nude and the scene where the president holds a dildo. To date, this is Mötley Crüe's fourth music video to be banned from MTV, following "Girls, Girls, Girls", "You're All I Need" and "Misunderstood". Another version of the video was made, removing the dildo and censoring all nudity, though MTV still refused to air it, due to the gruesome death scenes still being shown.

== Charts ==
Chart (2000)	Peak position
US Mainstream Rock (Billboard)	13
