= Supersonic and Demonic Relics =

Compilation album by Mötley Crüe
- Released: June 29, 1999
- Recorded: 1981–1998
- Genres: Heavy metal; alternative metal
- Length: 68:53
- Label: Mötley

Mötley Crüe chronology
Greatest Hits (1998)	Supersonic and Demonic Relics (1999)	Live: Entertainment or Death (1999)

Singles from Supersonic and Demonic Relics
- 1. "Teaser" Released: 1999

Professional ratings
Review scores
Source	Rating
AllMusic	3/5 stars
The Rolling Stone Album Guide	2.5/5 stars

Supersonic and Demonic Relics is the fourth compilation album by Mötley Crüe. It was released in 1999 on Mötley Records. The album is a collection of unreleased tracks as well as rare material, including songs from the limited edition "Quaternary" EP, the greatest hits compilation Decade of Decadence, as well as demos and live versions.

== Background ==
The compilation features the songs "Primal Scream", "Angela" and "Anarchy in the U.K.", which were all originally recorded specifically for the group's first compilation album Decade of Decadence in 1991. Three tracks from the Quaternary EP are also included.

The cover song "Teaser", which was first released on the Make a Difference Foundation's Stairway To Heaven/Highway To Hell compilation in 1989 & also featured on Decade of Decadence, was released as a single for this album and charted at number 35 on the Mainstream rock charts.

== Track listing ==
No.	Title	Writer(s)	Length
1.	"Teaser" (from Stairway to Heaven/Highway to Hell)	Tommy Bolin; Jeff Cook	5:17
2.	"Primal Scream" (from Decade of Decadence '81-'91)	Tommy Lee; Nikki Sixx; Mick Mars; Vince Neil	4:45
3.	"Sinners & Saints" (previously unreleased)	Mars; Sixx	2:26
4.	"Monsterous" (previously unreleased)	Sixx	1:03
5.	"Say Yeah" (previously unreleased)	Sixx	5:05
6.	"Planet Boom" (from Quaternary)	Lee	3:48
7.	"Bittersuite" (from Quaternary)	Mars	3:17
8.	"Father" (from Quaternary)	Sixx	3:59
9.	"Anarchy in the U.K." (from Decade of Decadence '81-'91)	Paul Cook; Steve Jones; Glen Matlock; Johnny Rotten	3:20
10.	"So Good, So Bad" (previously unreleased)	Mars; Sixx	3:56
11.	"Hooligan's Holiday" (extended holiday version by Skinny Puppy)	John Corabi; Lee; Mars; Sixx	11:07
12.	"Rock 'N' Roll Junkie" (from The Adventures of Ford Fairlane soundtrack)	Sixx; Mars; Lee	4:01
13.	"Angela" (from Decade of Decadence '81-'91)	Lee; Mars; Neil; Sixx	3:54
14.	"Mood Ring" (previously unreleased)	Mars; Sixx; Lee; Neil	2:22
15.	"Dr. Feelgood" (live)	Mars; Sixx	6:43
16.	"Knock 'Em Dead, Kid" (demo)	Sixx; Neil	3:39
17.	"Anarchy in the U.K." (music video)	P. Cook; Jones; Matlock; Rotten	3:20
