= Quaternary (EP) =

EP by Mötley Crüe
- Released: April 1994
- Recorded: 1994
- Genre: Alternative metal
- Length: 18:55
- Label: Elektra
- Producer: Bob Rock

Mötley Crüe chronology
Mötley Crüe (1994)	Quaternary (1994)	Generation Swine (1997)

Professional ratings
Review scores
Source	Rating
Collector's Guide to Heavy Metal	6/10

Quaternary is an EP by Mötley Crüe. It was released in 1994 on Elektra. The EP, which was initially going to be titled Leftovers, was made available as a mail-in offer for purchasers of the self-titled album in a limited quantity of 20,000 copies.

== Background ==
The EP features one song from each member of the band ("Planet Boom" by Tommy Lee, "Bittersuite" by Mick Mars, "Father" by Nikki Sixx, and "Friends" by John Corabi), along with the song "Babykills" which is performed by the entire band.

Songs 1–3 and 7 were reissued on the Supersonic and Demonic Relics compilation in 1999. Songs 1–2 were featured on the Red, White & Crüe compilation in 2005, and all the tracks were made available on the Music to Crash Your Car To: Vol. 2 box set in 2004.

The rap metal-influenced "Planet Boom" was later released on the soundtrack for Tommy Lee's then-wife Pamela Anderson's movie Barb Wire. However, the song was remade, credited to Tommy Lee only, and the title was changed to "Welcome to Planet Boom". A music video was also released for the song around the same time as the film's release.

== Track listing ==
Original release
No.	Title	Writer(s)	Producer(s)	Length
1.	"Planet Boom"	Tommy Lee	Lee; Bob Rock	3:49
2.	"Bittersuite" (Instrumental)	Mick Mars	Mars; Rock	3:17
3.	"Father"	Nikki Sixx	Sixx; Rock	3:58
4.	"Friends"	John Corabi	Corabi; Rock	2:28
5.	"Babykills"	Corabi; Lee; Mars; Sixx	Rock	5:23

Japanese bonus tracks
No.	Title	Writer(s)	Producer(s)	Length
6.	"10.000 Miles Away"	Corabi; Lee; Mars; Sixx	Rock	6:20
7.	"Hooligan's Holiday" (Extended Holiday Version by Skinny Puppy)	Corabi; Lee; Mars; Sixx	Rock	11:07
8.	"Hammered" (Demo)	Corabi; Lee; Mars; Sixx	Rock	4:39
9.	"Livin' in the No" (Demo)	Corabi; Lee; Mars; Sixx	Rock	4:26

== Credits ==
- John Corabi – lead vocals, rhythm guitar, piano, backing vocals
- Mick Mars – lead guitar, rhythm guitar, backing vocals
- Nikki Sixx – bass guitar, lead vocals on "Father", backing vocals
- Tommy Lee – drums, percussion, synthesizer, lead vocals on "Planet Boom", backing vocals
