= If You Hadn't Been There =

2025 single by Dolly Parton

Single by Dolly Parton
- Released: March 6, 2025
- Genre: Country
- Length: 3:29
- Label: Butterfly
- Songwriter: Dolly Parton
- Producers: Kent Wells; Gregg Perry

Dolly Parton singles chronology
"Please Please Please" (2025)	"If You Hadn't Been There" (2025)	"Home Sweet Home" (2025)

Official audio
- "If You Hadn't Been There" on YouTube

"If You Hadn't Been There" is a song by American singer-songwriter Dolly Parton, released on March 6, 2025. The song was released as a heartfelt tribute to her husband, Carl Dean, who had died earlier that week at the age of 82.

The song reflects on the profound impact Dean had on Parton's life and career, expressing gratitude for his unwavering support and love throughout their marriage. Despite Parton's fame, Dean chose to remain out of the spotlight and mostly lived in private life during their marriage.

== Background ==
We have spent 60 precious and meaningful years together. Like all great love stories, they never end. They live on in memory and song. He will always be the star of my life story, and I dedicate this song to him..

— Dolly Parton on the meaning behind the song, via social media accounts.

After her husband of nearly sixty years, Carl Dean, died on March 3, 2025, Parton wrote and released the song to honor his memory.

Parton revealed the name of the song through her Instagram profile, along with an old photo of the couple, with the singer embracing her husband from behind.

== Chart performance ==
In the United Kingdom, "If You Hadn't Been There" debuted at number 21 on both the UK Singles Downloads and UK Singles Sales charts, respectively, on March 14, 2025.

== Charts ==
Chart performance for "If You Hadn't Been There"
Chart (2025)	Peak position
UK Singles Sales (OCC)	21
US Digital Song Sales (Billboard)	3
