= Monster World Tour (Kiss) =

2012–13 concert tour by Kiss

- Tour by Kiss
- Associated album: Monster
- Start date: November 7, 2012
- End date: November 8, 2013
- Legs: 5
- No. of shows: 56

Kiss concert chronology
- The Tour (2012); Monster World Tour (2012–2013); Kiss 40th Anniversary World Tour (2014–2015)

The Monster World Tour was a concert tour by the American hard rock group Kiss in support of their 20th studio album, Monster. Fresh off the heels of the recent success of The Tour with Mötley Crüe and the second annual Kiss Kruise, the tour officially began on November 7, 2012, in Buenos Aires, Argentina. Kiss played shows in Australia for the first time since 2008, and Europe, including a few festivals in June. They played their longest Canadian tour to date in July through early August with a few US concerts following after, including a show taped to air during halftime of ArenaBowl XXVI in Orlando, Florida. They played in Japan for the first time since 2006 in October 2013.

The new stage show, first used in the European leg, involved a giant robotic spider that moved across the stage and all four members were lifted into the air. The spider shot pyro from its legs and had eyes that glowed.

In the tour program for the band's final tour, Simmons reflected on the tour:

With Kiss it's always about giving the fans more bang for their buck and with the Monster tour we delivered just that. The Monster tour is beyond anything the fans have ever seen. We're using the latest technology and lights. We have a gigantic robotic spider on the stage, which is spectacular. It shoots fireballs and like a spider, it can move all over the place. It's simply spectacular.

== Support acts ==
- Rosa Tattooada (Porto Alegre, Brazil)
- Diva Demolition (Australia)
- Thin Lizzy (Australia)
- Mötley Crüe (Australia)
- Satan Takes A Holiday (Sweden)
- Hardcore Superstar (Sweden)
- Reckless Love (Finland)
- Kvelertak (Norway)
- Ingenting (Norway)
- Five Finger Death Punch (Germany)
- Bitch & Chips (Czech Republic)
- Rival Sons (Zurich)
- Shinedown (Canada)
- Leogun (United States)

== Tour dates ==
List of 2012 concerts
Date	City	Country	Venue
November 7, 2012	Buenos Aires	Argentina	River Plate Stadium
November 10, 2012 (Note: The concert on November 10, 2012 was a part of Maquinaria Festival.)	Santiago	Chile	Club de Campo Las Vizcachas
November 12, 2012	Asunción	Paraguay	Jockey Club
November 14, 2012	Porto Alegre	Brazil	Gigantinho
November 17, 2012	São Paulo	Brazil	Arena Skol Anhembi
November 18, 2012	Rio de Janeiro	Brazil	HSBC Arena

List of 2013 concerts
Date	City	Country	Venue
February 28, 2013	Perth	Australia	Perth Arena
March 3, 2013	Adelaide	Australia	Victoria Park Racecourse
March 5, 2013	Melbourne	Australia	Etihad Stadium
March 6, 2013	Melbourne	Australia	Etihad Stadium
March 9, 2013	Sydney	Australia	Allphones Arena
March 10, 2013	Sydney	Australia	Allphones Arena
March 12, 2013	Brisbane	Australia	Brisbane Entertainment Centre
March 16, 2013	Mackay	Australia	Virgin Australia Stadium
June 1, 2013	Stockholm	Sweden	Friends Arena
June 3, 2013	Helsinki	Finland	Hartwall Areena
June 6, 2013	Sölvesborg (Note: The concert on June 6, 2013 was a part of Sweden Rock Festival.)	Sweden	Norje Havsbad
June 8, 2013	Stavanger	Norway	Viking Stadion
June 11, 2013	Copenhagen	Denmark	Forum Copenhagen
June 12, 2013	Berlin	Germany	Waldbühne
June 14, 2013	Prague	Czech Republic	O2 Arena
June 15, 2013 (Note: The concert on June 15, 2013 was a part of Nova Rock Festival.)	Nickelsdorf	Austria	Pannonia Filds
June 17, 2013	Codroipo	Italy	Villa Manin
June 18, 2013	Milan	Italy	Mediolanum Forum
June 20, 2013	Zürich	Switzerland	Hallenstadion
June 22, 2013 (Note: The concert on June 22, 2013 was a part of Hellfest.)	Clisson	France	Val de Moine
July 5, 2013	Victoria	Canada	Save-On-Foods Memorial Centre
July 6, 2013	Vancouver	Canada	Rogers Arena
July 8, 2013	Kelowna	Canada	Prospera Place
July 10, 2013	Lethbridge	Canada	Enmax Centre
July 12, 2013	Edmonton	Canada	Rexall Place
July 14, 2013	Saskatoon	Canada	Credit Union Centre
July 16, 2013	Regina	Canada	Brandt Centre
July 17, 2013	Brandon	Canada	Keystone Centre
July 18, 2013	Winnipeg	Canada	MTS Centre
July 20, 2013	Cadott	United States	Rock Fest
July 23, 2013	Sudbury	Canada	Sudbury Arena
July 25, 2013	Ottawa	Canada	Canadian Tire Centre
July 26, 2013	Toronto	Canada	Molson Amphitheatre
July 27, 2013	London	Canada	Budweiser Gardens
July 29, 2013	Montreal	Canada	Bell Centre
July 31, 2013	Saint John	Canada	Harbour Station
August 1, 2013	Halifax	Canada	Halifax Metro Centre
August 3, 2013	St. John's	Canada	Mile One Centre
August 4, 2013	St. John's	Canada	Mile One Centre
August 7, 2013	Gilford	United States	Meadowbrook U.S. Cellular Pavilion
August 9, 2013	Verona	United States	Turning Stone Events Center
August 10, 2013	Uncasville	United States	Mohegan Sun Arena
August 12, 2013	Portsmouth	United States	nTelos Wireless Pavilion
August 13, 2013	Simpsonville	United States	Charter Amphitheater at Heritage Park
August 16, 2013	Orlando	United States	Amway Center
August 18, 2013	Hollywood	United States	Hard Rock Live
October 19, 2013	Chiba	Japan	Makuhari Messe
October 21, 2013	Osaka	Japan	Osaka-jō Hall
October 23, 2013	Tokyo	Japan	Nippon Budokan
October 24, 2013	Tokyo	Japan	Nippon Budokan
November 8, 2013	Calgary	Canada	Scotiabank Saddledome

=== Box office score data ===
Venue	City	Tickets sold / available
River Plate Stadium	Buenos Aires	48,000 / 55,000 (87%)
Hipódromo de Asunción	Asunción	8,161 / 10,000 (81%)
Arena Skol Anhembi	São Paulo	20,567 / 25,000 (82%)
HSBC Arena	Rio de Janeiro	6,803 / 9,500 (71%)
Perth Arena	Perth	12,775 / 13,335 (95%)
Clipsal 500	Adelaide	40,000 / 40,000 (100%)
Etihad Stadium	Melbourne	25,750 / 26,000 (99%)
Allphones Arena	Sydney	18,023 / 23,466 (76%)
Brisbane Entertainment Center	Brisbane	9,597 / 9,801 (97%)

- Top 100 Worldwide Mid Year Tours 2013: Kiss/Mötley Crüe, #84

== Personnel ==
=== Kiss ===
- Paul Stanley – vocals, rhythm guitar
- Gene Simmons – vocals, bass
- Tommy Thayer – lead guitar, vocals
- Eric Singer – drums, vocals

Staff

- Francis Stueber - introduction voice
