= The Demo Compilation =

Compilation album by Refused
- Released: 8 July 1997
- Recorded: 1992 at Hortlax Hardcore Studio, Hortlax, Sweden
- Genre: Hardcore punk, heavy hardcore, thrashcore
- Length: 56:00
- Label: Burning Heart Records, Startracks
- Producer: Pelle Gunnerfeldt

Refused chronology
The E.P. Compilation (1997)	The Demo Compilation (1997)	The Shape of Punk to Come (1998)

The Demo Compilation is the second compilation of old songs by Swedish hardcore punk band Refused. It was released in 1997 through Burning Heart Records. It is also known as This Album Contains Old Songs & Old Pictures Vol. 2.

== Track listing ==
Tracks 1–15 collect the EPs First Demo: Refused (1992, self-released) and Second Demo: Operation Headfirst (1992, Umeå Hardcore Records). Tracks 16–21 are bonus songs.

1. "Re-fused" – 2:41
2. "Another One" – 2:19
3. "Enough Is Enough" – 2:07
4. "Fusible Front" – 2:25
5. "Reach Out" – 2:07
6. "Fudge" – 2:33
7. "Blind" – 3:05
8. "Back in Black" (Young/Young/Johnson) – 3:36
9. "The New Deal" – 2:13
10. "I Wish" – 2:55
11. "Where Is Equality?" – 2:17
12. "Who Died?" – 1:51
13. "Burn" – 3:32
14. "Racial Liberation" – 2:30
15. "Hate Breeds Hate" – 3:28
16. "I'll Choose My Side" – 2:51
17. "The Marlboro Man Is Dead" – 3:02
18. "Defeated" – 2:21
19. "Live Wire" – 3:02 (Mötley Crüe cover)
20. "Gratitude" – 2:39 (Beastie Boys cover)
21. [untitled] – 2:20 (Gorilla Biscuits cover; the song is called "No Reason Why" and this is a live recording)

== Personnel ==
- Dennis Lyxzén – lead vocals, layout (all tracks)
- Pär Hansson – guitar (all tracks)
- Henrik Jansson – guitar (tracks 9–15)
- Jonas Lidgren – bass (tracks 1–8)
- Magnus Flagge – bass (tracks 9–15)
- David Sandström – drums, percussion, liner notes (all tracks)
- Jon Brännström – layout
- Pelle Gunnerfeldt – production
- Eskil Lövström – mastering
  - Tracks 16–21 are unknown personnel
