= Please Please Please (Sabrina Carpenter song) =

Single by Sabrina Carpenter

from the album Short n' Sweet
- B-side: "Please Please Please (acoustic)"
- Released: June 6, 2024
- Recorded: March 2024
- Studio: Electric Lady (New York City)
- Genre: Country pop; disco-pop; synth-pop; yacht rock
- Length: 3:06
- Label: Island
- Songwriters: Sabrina Carpenter; Amy Allen; Jack Antonoff
- Producer: Jack Antonoff

Sabrina Carpenter singles chronology
"Espresso" (2024)	"Please Please Please" (2024)	"Taste" (2024)

Dolly Parton singles chronology
"Friends!" (2025)	"Please Please Please" (2025)	"If You Hadn't Been There" (2025)

Music videos
- "Please Please Please" on YouTube "Please Please Please" (ft. Dolly Parton) on YouTube

"Please Please Please" is a song by American singer Sabrina Carpenter from her sixth studio album, Short n' Sweet (2024). It was released through Island Records on June 6, 2024, as the second single from the album. Produced by Jack Antonoff, it was written by Antonoff, Carpenter, and Amy Allen. Musically, it is a pop ballad with elements of country and disco, and lyrically, it sees Carpenter discuss her fears that her boyfriend will let his bad-boy reputation overshadow their relationship and embarrass her.

The song received acclaim from music critics upon release. "Please Please Please" peaked at the top of the Billboard Hot 100, becoming her first number-one single on the chart. Outside of the United States, "Please Please Please" topped the charts in Australia, Ireland, New Zealand, Norway, and the United Kingdom. It peaked within the top ten in 18 other countries, including Canada, Denmark, the Netherlands, Portugal, and Sweden.

"Please Please Please" was nominated for Song of the Year at the 67th Annual Grammy Awards. A remix with Dolly Parton was released in February 2025, and promoted to US country radio.

== Background and release ==
Following the commercial success of "Espresso", Sabrina Carpenter announced her upcoming sixth studio album Short n' Sweet on June 3, 2024. She simultaneously promised an upcoming surprise for her fans, which would turn out to be the single. Only two days later, Carpenter took to social media to announce the song release and share a teaser of the accompanying music video featuring cinematic visuals set to showcase her acting skills. The clip shows her wearing a lacy red outfit in a robbery-like setting, as well as engaging in a romance with a criminal played by her then-boyfriend Barry Keoghan.

In February 2025, Carpenter released a deluxe version of Short n' Sweet featuring a duet version of "Please Please Please" with American singer Dolly Parton (with the swearing omitted), which was promoted to country radio in the US.

== Lyrics and music ==
"Please Please Please"

"Please Please Please" has been labeled as a pop ballad incorporating various styles such as country pop, disco-pop, synth-pop, and yacht rock with elements of country, alternative country, and disco. It incorporates pulsing synthesizers and multiple vocal layers, with a key change on the second verse Lyrically, the song discussed a famous woman's anxieties regarding her public relationship, that she wants the best version of her lover but afraid that he might let his bad-boy persona slips out, destroys her pride and embarrasses her.

== Music video ==
Promotional poster for the music video

The music video for "Please Please Please" was filmed on May 23, 2024, in Staten Island, New York, and serves as a sequel to the "Espresso" music video released earlier in the year. The video explores a romantic dynamic between Carpenter and a convict, played by Irish actor Barry Keoghan who, at that time, was Carpenter's boyfriend. The prison scenes were shot in the Arthur Kill Correctional Facility, owned by Broadway Stages.

The video continues from where "Espresso" ended and focuses on Carpenter's relationship with a chaotic love interest. The video's director, Bardia Zeinali, expanded on this idea, incorporating themes of role reversals and power dynamics, as well as recurring scenes such as Carpenter repeatedly picking up the love interest outside the same prison at different times. Pamela Anderson, Tommy Lee, Madonna, Dennis Rodman, Quentin Tarantino, Natural Born Killers (1994), Bonnie and Clyde, and Thelma & Louise (1991) were cited as inspirations for the video. Cinematographer Sean Price Williams shot the video on film.

A second music video for the song, set to the duet version with Dolly Parton, was filmed on January 25, 2025, in front of a rear projection screen and co-directed by Carpenter alongside Williams. It was released on February 14, 2025, to coincide with the release of the deluxe edition of Short n' Sweet. The black and white vignette shows Carpenter and Parton driving a truck, having stolen a bag of money and kidnapped a man with the intention of burying him somewhere; evading the police while doing so.

== Commercial performance ==
On June 17, "Please Please Please" reached number one on the Billboard Global 200. On June 22, 2024, the song debuted at number two on the Billboard Hot 100, making it Carpenter's highest debut on the chart and highest-charting single then. The following week, it reached the top spot of the chart, making it her first chart-topper in the United States.

In the United Kingdom, with "Please Please Please" at number one and her previous song "Espresso" at number two on the UK Singles Chart, Carpenter became the first female artist to hold the top two positions of the chart for five weeks in a row and matched Ed Sheeran as the only artist to hold this feat in general. On July 12, 2024 – for the week ending date July 18, 2024 – "Please Please Please" was dethroned from the top of the UK Singles Chart with "Espresso" returning to the summit. On July 26, 2024 – for the week ending date August 1, 2024 – "Please Please Please" dethroned "Espresso" from the top of the UK Singles Chart to return to the summit for a second time, with the former song being replaced at number two by "Birds of a Feather" by Billie Eilish, and the latter song falling to number nine on the chart.

== Live performances ==
Carpenter sang "Please Please Please" for the first time at the Governors Ball Music Festival on June 8, 2024. Later that month, she performed the song on the Live Lounge. At the 2024 MTV Video Music Awards, she performed the song as part of a medley with "Taste" and "Espresso". Entertainment Weekly's Lester Fabian Brathwaite and Vogue's Hannah Jackson thought Carpenter channeled Britney Spears, Marilyn Monroe, and Madonna on her Blond Ambition World Tour (1990). "Please Please Please" was included on the permanent setlist of Carpenter's sixth headlining tour, the Short n' Sweet Tour (2024–2025). Carpenter performed "Please Please Please" with American singer-songwriter Taylor Swift at the second New Orleans show of the Eras Tour (2023–2024), as an acoustic mashup with "Espresso" and "Is It Over Now?" (2023). On February 2, 2025, Carpenter performed "Please Please Please" at the 67th Annual Grammy Awards.

== Track listing ==
- Digital download and streaming – single
1. "Please Please Please" – 3:06
2. "Please Please Please" (acoustic) – 3:01
3. "Please Please Please" (clean) – 3:06
4. "Please Please Please" (sped up) – 2:32
5. "Please Please Please" (slowed down) – 3:30
6. "Please Please Please" (a cappella) – 3:06
7. "Please Please Please" (instrumental) – 3:06
- 7-inch single
1. "Please Please Please" – 3:06
2. "Please Please Please" (acoustic) – 3:01

== Accolades ==
Organization	Year	Category	Result	Ref.
MTV Video Music Awards	2024	Best Direction	Nominated	
MTV Video Music Awards	2024	Best Art Direction	Nominated	
MTV Video Music Awards	2024	Song of Summer	Nominated	
Camerimage	2024	Golden Frog for Best Music Video	Nominated	
Grammy Awards	2025	Song of the Year	Nominated	
Hollywood Music Video Awards	2025	Best Pop	Won	
Hollywood Music Video Awards	2025	Best Styling	Nominated	
Hollywood Music Video Awards	2025	Best Narrative	Nominated	
iHeartRadio Music Awards	2025	Best Music Video	Nominated	

== Credits and personnel ==
Credits are adapted from the liner notes of Short n' Sweet.

Recording and management

- Recorded at Electric Lady Studios (New York City)
- Evan Smith's Performance Recorded at Pleasure Hill Recording (Portland, Maine)
- Mixed at MixStar Studios (Virginia Beach)
- Mastered at Nomograph Mastering (Los Angeles)
- Sabalicious Songs (BMI) administered by Songs Of Universal, Inc., Songs Of Universal, Inc./Ducky Donath Music (BMI), Kenny + Betty Tunes (ASCAP) administered by WC Music Corp.

Personnel

- Sabrina Carpenter – vocals, songwriting
- Jack Antonoff – LinnDrum programming, percussion, drum kit, electric guitars, acoustic guitars, Roland Juno-60, bass guitar, Moog, Prophet-5, Korg M1, production, songwriting
- Amy Allen – songwriting
- Bobby Hawk - violin
- Laura Sisk - engineering
- Oli Jacobs - engineering
- Jack Manning - engineering assistance
- Jozef Caldwell - engineering assistance
- Joey Miller - engineering assistance
- Evan Smith - flute, engineering
- Serban Ghenea – mixing
- Bryce Bordone – mix engineering
- Ruairi O'Flaherty – mastering

== Charts ==
=== Weekly charts ===
Chart (2024–2025)	Peak position
Argentina Hot 100 (Billboard)	34
Australia (ARIA)	1
Austria (Ö3 Austria Top 40)	13
Belgium (Ultratop 50 Flanders)	30
Bolivia Airplay (Monitor Latino)	4
Bolivia Streaming (Billboard)	23
Brazil Hot 100 (Billboard)	38
Canada Hot 100 (Billboard)	3
Canada CHR/Top 40 (Billboard)	3
Canada Hot AC (Billboard)	12
Chile Airplay (Monitor Latino)	7
Chile Streaming (Billboard)	24
CIS Airplay (TopHit)	53
Croatia (Billboard)	17
Croatia International Airplay (Top lista)	12
Czech Republic Singles Digital (ČNS IFPI)	15
Denmark (Tracklisten)	8
Estonia Airplay (TopHit)	4
El Salvador Airplay (Monitor Latino)	16
Finland (Suomen virallinen lista)	19
France (SNEP)	44
Germany (GfK)	33
Global 200 (Billboard)	1
Greece International (IFPI)	4
Hong Kong (Billboard)	12
Hungary (Single Top 40)	38
Iceland (Tónlistinn)	2
Iceland (Tónlistinn) Duet version featuring Dolly Parton	33
India International (IMI)	2
Indonesia (Billboard)	3
Ireland (IRMA)	1
Israel (Mako Hitlist)	39
Italy (FIMI)	90
Japan Hot Overseas (Billboard Japan)	2
Latvia Airplay (LaIPA)	6
Latvia Streaming (LaIPA)	7
Lebanon (Lebanese Top 20)	3
Lithuania (AGATA)	11
Lithuania Airplay (TopHit)	2
Luxembourg (Billboard)	8
Malaysia (Billboard)	2
Malaysia International (RIM)	2
Middle East and North Africa (IFPI)	14
Mexico (Billboard)	23
Netherlands (Dutch Top 40)	16
Netherlands (Single Top 100)	6
New Zealand (Recorded Music NZ)	1
Nigeria (TurnTable Top 100)	85
Norway (VG-lista)	1
Panama (Monitor Latino)	10
Peru (Billboard)	9
Philippines (Billboard)	2
Philippines (Philippines Hot 100)	3
Poland (Polish Streaming Top 100)	28
Portugal (AFP)	2
Serbia Airplay (Radiomonitor)	13
Singapore (RIAS)	1
Slovakia Airplay (ČNS IFPI)	47
Slovakia Singles Digital (ČNS IFPI)	25
South Africa Streaming (TOSAC)	8
South Korea BGM (Circle)	80
South Korea Download (Circle)	185
Spain (Promusicae)	23
Sweden (Sverigetopplistan)	6
Switzerland (Schweizer Hitparade)	12
Turkey International Airplay (Radiomonitor Türkiye)	9
United Arab Emirates (IFPI)	9
UK Singles (Official Charts)	1
US Billboard Hot 100	1
US Adult Contemporary (Billboard)	20
US Adult Pop Airplay (Billboard)	9
US Dance Airplay (Billboard)	15
US Hot Country Songs (Billboard) Duet version featuring Dolly Parton	17
US Pop Airplay (Billboard)	1
Venezuela (Record Report)	34

=== Monthly charts ===
Chart (2024)	Peak position
CIS Airplay (TopHit)	63
Czech Republic (Singles Digitál – Top 100)	45
Estonia Airplay (TopHit)	8
Lithuania Airplay (TopHit)	4
Panama International (PRODUCE)	43
Paraguay Airplay (SGP)	33
Slovakia (Rádio Top 100)	56
Slovakia (Singles Digitál – Top 100)	39

=== Year-end charts ===
Chart (2024)	Position
Australia (ARIA)	14
Belgium (Ultratop 50 Flanders)	97
Canada (Canadian Hot 100)	17
Denmark (Tracklisten)	69
Estonia Airplay (TopHit)	24
Global 200 (Billboard)	17
Global Singles (IFPI)	12
Iceland (Tónlistinn)	9
Netherlands (Dutch Top 40)	76
Netherlands (Single Top 100)	60
New Zealand (Recorded Music NZ)	10
Philippines (Philippines Hot 100)	11
Portugal (AFP)	41
Sweden (Sverigetopplistan)	79
Switzerland (Schweizer Hitparade)	81
UK Singles (OCC)	10
US Billboard Hot 100	16
US Adult Top 40 (Billboard)	37
US Mainstream Top 40 (Billboard)	20
Venezuela Anglo (Record Report)	13

Chart (2025)	Position
Argentina Airplay (Monitor Latino)	68
Australia (ARIA)	53
Canada (Canadian Hot 100)	49
Global 200 (Billboard)	25
New Zealand (Recorded Music NZ)	44
Philippines (Philippines Hot 100)	75
UK Singles (OCC)	43
US Billboard Hot 100	50
US Pop Airplay (Billboard)	50

== Certifications ==
Certifications for "Please Please Please"
Region	Certification	Certified units/sales
Australia (ARIA)	6× Platinum	420,000^{‡}
Austria (IFPI Austria)	Gold	15,000^{‡}
Belgium (BRMA)	Platinum	40,000^{‡}
Brazil (Pro-Música Brasil)	3× Diamond	480,000^{‡}
Canada (Music Canada)	7× Platinum	560,000^{‡}
Denmark (IFPI Danmark)	Platinum	90,000^{‡}
France (SNEP)	Platinum	200,000^{‡}
New Zealand (RMNZ)	4× Platinum	120,000^{‡}
Poland (ZPAV)	Platinum	50,000^{‡}
Portugal (AFP)	2× Platinum	20,000^{‡}
Spain (Promusicae)	Platinum	60,000^{‡}
Switzerland (IFPI Switzerland)	Gold	15,000^{‡}
United Kingdom (BPI)	3× Platinum	1,800,000^{‡}
United States (RIAA)	5× Platinum	5,000,000^{‡}
Streaming
Central America (CFC)	Platinum	7,000,000^{†}
Greece (IFPI Greece)	Platinum	2,000,000^{†}
Sweden (GLF)	Platinum	12,000,000^{†}
^{‡} Sales+streaming figures based on certification alone.^{†} Streaming-only figures based on certification alone.

== Release history ==
Region	Date	Format(s)	Version	Label	Ref.
Various	June 6, 2024	Digital download; streaming	Original	Island	
Various	June 18, 2024	Digital download; streaming	EP	Island	
United States	June 18, 2024	Contemporary hit radio	Original	Island	
Various	August 23, 2024	7-inch single	Original; Acoustic	Island	
United States	February 14, 2025	Country radio	Dolly Parton duet	Island	
