= Beauty (song) =

Single by Mötley Crüe

from the album Generation Swine
- Released: December 16, 1997
- Recorded: 1996–97
- Genre: Industrial rock; alternative metal
- Length: 3:47
- Label: Elektra
- Songwriters: Scott Humphrey; Nikki Sixx; Tommy Lee
- Producer: Scott Humphrey

Mötley Crüe singles chronology
"Afraid" (1997)	"Beauty" (1997)	"Glitter" (1997)

"Beauty" is a song by the American heavy metal band Mötley Crüe, released as the second single on their 1997 album Generation Swine. The song charted at number 37 on the Mainstream rock charts.

== Charts ==
Chart (1997)	Peak position
US Mainstream Rock (Billboard)	37
