= Decade of Decadence 81–91 =

Greatest hits album by Mötley Crüe
- Released: September 23, 1991
- Recorded: 1981–1991
- Genres: Heavy metal; glam metal
- Length: 62:48
- Label: Elektra
- Producers: Mötley Crüe (tracks 1–2); Tom Werman (tracks 3–8); Bob Rock (tracks 9–15)

Mötley Crüe chronology
Dr. Feelgood (1989)	Decade of Decadence 81–91 (1991)	Mötley Crüe (1994)

Singles from Decade of Decadence 81–91
- 1. "Primal Scream" Released: August 1991; 2. "Home Sweet Home '91" Released: November 1991; 3. "Anarchy in the U.S.A." Released: 1991; 4. "Angela" Released: December 1991 (Japan)

Professional ratings
Review scores
Source	Rating
AllMusic	4.5/5 stars
Chicago Tribune	3/4 stars
Christgau's Consumer Guide	(neither)
Collector's Guide to Heavy Metal	8/10
Entertainment Weekly (1991)	B+

Decade of Decadence 81–91 is the first compilation album by the American heavy metal band Mötley Crüe, released in September 1991. It peaked at number 2 on the US Billboard 200 chart. It was the band's sixth album overall and the first of several greatest hits compilations.

== Overview ==
Though it was intended to be the band's first compilation album, the content was unlike a standard compilation release. As well as six of the band's greatest hits, it featured three remixes "Live Wire (Kick Ass '91 Remix)", "Piece of Your Action (Screamin' '91 Remix)" and "Home Sweet Home '91 Remix", a soundtrack contribution "Rock 'n' Roll Junkie", a compilation album track "Teaser" (previously released on the Stairway to Heaven/Highway to Hell album), a previously unreleased live version "Kickstart My Heart (Live in Dallas, Texas)" and three newly recorded songs "Primal Scream", "Angela" and "Anarchy in the U.K.".

The album debuted at No. 2 in the US albums chart, just under Garth Brooks′ Ropin' The Wind, and was certified double platinum by the RIAA.

Music videos were made for three of the singles to promote the album. "Primal Scream", "Home Sweet Home '91", and "Anarchy in the U.K." which was largely shot on the bands Monsters of Rock tour in Europe. "Angela" was also released as a single.

The remix version of "Home Sweet Home" was the band's 8th and final Top 40 hit in 1991, reaching No. 37 on the Billboard Hot 100. The original 1985 version had only reached No. 89 on the same chart.

"Rock n' Roll Junkie" had been featured in the Andrew Dice Clay movie, The Adventures of Ford Fairlane, which featured a cameo by Vince Neil.

The songs, "Smokin' in the Boys Room", "Teaser" and "Anarchy in the U.K." are all cover songs, originally recorded by Brownsville Station, Tommy Bolin, and Sex Pistols respectively. During an MTV interview in 1991, Tommy Lee stated that Vince Neil recorded his vocals for "Anarchy in the U.K." in one take. Neil has stated that John Lydon phoned him saying the cover was brilliant.

== Reissue ==
The album was succeeded by Greatest Hits in 1998 and Red, White & Crüe in 2005. The songs, "Teaser", "Rock 'n' Roll Junkie", "Primal Scream", "Angela", and "Anarchy in the U.K." were reissued on the Supersonic and Demonic Relics compilation in 1999, and the remixes of "Live Wire", "Piece of Your Action", "Home Sweet Home" and the live version of "Kickstart My Heart" were reissued on the Music to Crash Your Car To: Vol. 2 box set.

== Track listing ==
No.	Title	Writer(s)	Original release	Length
1.	"Live Wire" (Kick Ass '91 remix)	Nikki Sixx	Too Fast for Love (1981)	3:16
2.	"Piece of Your Action" (Screamin' '91 remix)	Sixx; Vince Neil	Too Fast for Love	4:39
3.	"Shout at the Devil"	Sixx	Shout at the Devil (1983)	3:14
4.	"Looks That Kill"	Sixx	Shout at the Devil	4:08
5.	"Home Sweet Home '91" (remix)	Sixx; Tommy Lee	Theatre of Pain (1985)	4:01
6.	"Smokin' in the Boys Room" (Brownsville Station cover)	Cub Koda; Michael Lutz	Theatre of Pain	3:27
7.	"Girls, Girls, Girls"	Sixx; Mick Mars; Lee	Girls, Girls, Girls (1987)	4:29
8.	"Wild Side"	Sixx; Neil; Lee	Girls, Girls, Girls	4:40
9.	"Dr. Feelgood"	Sixx; Mars	Dr. Feelgood (1989)	4:48
10.	"Kickstart My Heart" (live in Dallas, Texas, July 1990)	Sixx	Dr. Feelgood	4:57
11.	"Teaser" (Tommy Bolin cover)	Tommy Bolin; Jeff Cook	Stairway to Heaven/Highway to Hell (1989)	5:16
12.	"Rock 'n' Roll Junkie"	Sixx; Mars; Lee	The Adventures of Ford Fairlane soundtrack (1990)	4:01
13.	"Primal Scream"	Sixx; Mars; Neil; Lee	New recording	4:46
14.	"Angela"	Sixx; Mars; Neil; Lee	New recording	3:54
15.	"Anarchy in the U.S.A." (Sex Pistols cover)	Johnny Rotten; Steve Jones; Glen Matlock; Paul Cook	New recording	3:20

Japan bonus tracks
No.	Title	Music	Length
16.	"Red Hot" (live)	Sixx; Mars; Neil	3:28
17.	"Dr. Feelgood" (live)	Sixx; Mars	6:42

== Video album ==
Decade of Decadence was also released as a video album on VHS on March 24, 1992. The video features new interviews and the band's full catalog of music videos, which were in part previously released on the video albums Uncensored and Dr. Feelgood The Videos. It includes new live clips, music videos from the album Girls, Girls, Girls and the new music videos "Primal Scream", "Home Sweet Home '91", and "Anarchy in the U.K.". The interview segments were directed and produced by Brian Lockwood.

=== Track listing ===
1. "Live Wire"
2. "Piece Of Your Action"
3. "Shout At The Devil"
4. "Looks That Kill"
5. "Home Sweet Home '91"
6. "Smokin' in the Boys Room"
7. "Girls, Girls, Girls" (uncensored version)
8. "Wild Side"
9. "Dr. Feelgood" (UK edit version)
10. "Kickstart My Heart (Live)"
11. "Teaser"
12. "Rock 'N' Roll Junkie"
13. "Primal Scream"
14. "Angela"
15. "Anarchy in the U.K."

== Charts ==
=== Album ===
Chart (1991)	Peak position
Australian Albums (ARIA)	9
Canada Top Albums/CDs (RPM)	10
Finnish Albums (The Official Finnish Charts)	24
New Zealand Albums (RMNZ)	13
Swedish Albums (Sverigetopplistan)	43
Swiss Albums (Schweizer Hitparade)	22
UK Albums (Official Charts)	20
US Billboard 200	2

=== Singles ===
Year	Title	Chart	Position
1991	"Primal Scream"	Mainstream Rock (USA)	21
1991	"Primal Scream"	Australian Singles Chart	29
1991	"Primal Scream"	New Zealand Singles Chart	30
1991	"Primal Scream"	UK Singles Chart	32
1991	"Primal Scream"	Billboard Hot 100 (USA)	63
1991	"Home Sweet Home"	Billboard Hot 100 (USA)	37
1991	"Home Sweet Home"	Mainstream Rock (USA)	38
1992	"Home Sweet Home"	UK Singles Chart	37

== Certifications ==
=== Album ===
Region	Certification	Certified units/sales
Australia (ARIA)	Gold	35,000^{^}
Canada (Music Canada)	Platinum	100,000^{^}
Japan (RIAJ)	Gold	100,000^{^}
United States (RIAA)	2× Platinum	2,000,000^{^}
^{^} Shipments figures based on certification alone.

=== Video ===
Region	Certification	Certified units/sales
United States (RIAA)	Gold	50,000^{^}
^{^} Shipments figures based on certification alone.
