= Afraid (Mötley Crüe song) =

1997 single by Mötley Crüe

Single by Mötley Crüe

from the album Generation Swine
- Released: May 8, 1997
- Recorded: 1996–1997
- Genre: Industrial rock
- Length: 3:56
- Label: Elektra
- Songwriter: Nikki Sixx
- Producers: Scott Humphrey, Nikki Sixx, Tommy Lee

Mötley Crüe singles chronology
"Misunderstood" (1994)	"Afraid" (1997)	"Beauty" (1997)

Music video
- "Afraid" on YouTube

"Afraid" is a song by the American heavy metal band Mötley Crüe, released on their 1997 album Generation Swine. A two-track pig promo picture CD includes the 3:56 Swine Mix and 4:10 Rave Mix. Written by bassist Nikki Sixx, the lyrics were inspired by the early stages of his relationship with Donna D'Errico, when he felt she was running away from him out of fear of getting too close. The song charted at number 10 on the Mainstream rock charts. This is the first single featuring Vince Neil on lead vocals since their cover of "Anarchy in the U.K." in 1991.

== Music video ==
A video was made to promote the single, and was directed by Nancy Baldawil, and produced by Devin Whatley and Joseph Uliano. The video was filmed in May 1997, and first aired on June 9 of that year. Featured in the video is Hustler Magazine head Larry Flynt.

== Charts ==
Chart (1997)	Peak position
UK Singles (Official Charts)	58
UK Rock Chart	1
US Mainstream Rock (Billboard)	10

== Covers ==
American country musician and Staind lead vocalist Aaron Lewis recorded a cover of the song for the tribute album Nashville Outlaws: A Tribute to Mötley Crüe.
