= Cancelled (EP) =

EP by Mötley Crüe
- Released: October 4, 2024
- Recorded: 2023
- Genres: Heavy metal; alternative metal
- Length: 12:18
- Label: Big Machine
- Producer: Bob Rock

Mötley Crüe chronology
The Dirt Soundtrack (2019)	Cancelled (2024)	From the Beginning (2025)

Singles from Cancelled
- 1. "Dogs of War" Released: April 26, 2024; 2. "Fight for Your Right" Released: August 23, 2024

Cancelled is an EP by the American heavy metal band Mötley Crüe, released on October 4, 2024, through Big Machine Records. It is their first release with guitarist John 5, who replaced Mick Mars following his retirement from the band in October 2022.

== Background and production ==
On April 19, 2023, Mötley Crüe announced that they had begun working on new music with record producer Bob Rock. Bassist Nikki Sixx released a statement a month later, stating that it had finished production and had begun mixing the new material. In July 2023, frontman Vince Neil confirmed that the band recorded three brand new songs. Two months later, guitarist John 5 confirmed the title of a new song as "Dogs of War", and also revealed that the band had recorded a cover of "(You Gotta) Fight for Your Right (To Party!)" by Beastie Boys.

On April 23, 2024, it was announced that Mötley Crüe had signed a deal with Big Machine Records, and three days later the band released "Dogs of War", their first song in five years and their first with John 5. Neil told Billboard that same month that additional music from Mötley Crüe could be released by the end of 2024 or in 2025, but also stated that new material could result in "a few songs here, a few songs there" rather than a full-length album. Drummer Tommy Lee did not rule out releasing a new Mötley Crüe album, but stated that "recording and writing some stuff that you're feeling right at the moment and releasing it is, for us, a lot more fun and sort of a time stamp of where we're at right now." Sixx said that the band had recorded two other new singles that were ready to be released.

On August 23, 2024, Mötley Crüe released their cover version of "(You Gotta) Fight for Your Right (To Party!)" as a single, and announced on the same day that a new EP titled Cancelled would be released on October 4. "Cancelled" was also later released as a single.

== Track listing ==
All tracks are written by Nikki Sixx, Tommy Lee, and John Lowery, except "Fight for Your Right," written by the Beastie Boys and Rick Rubin.

No.	Title	Length
1.	"Cancelled"	4:47
2.	"Dogs of War"	4:04
3.	"Fight for Your Right" (Beastie Boys cover)	3:26
Total length:		12:18

== Personnel ==
Mötley Crüe

- Vince Neil – lead vocals
- Nikki Sixx – bass guitar
- Tommy Lee – drums
- John 5 – guitar

Additional musicians

- Chris Gestrin – keyboards
- Adam Greenholtz – keyboards
- Dexter Holland – backing vocals
- Noodles – backing vocals

Production

- Bob Rock – producer, mixing
- Adam Greenholtz – mixing, engineering
- Annie Kennedy – mixing assistant, engineering assistant
- Bobby Louden – engineering assistant
- Jake Rene – engineering assistant
- Chris Allgood – mastering
- Emily Lazar – mastering
- Sandi Spika Borchetta – creative director for Big Machine creative
- Kevin Capizzi – effects, production manager
- Justin Ford – creative director for Big Machine creative
- Joe Lalich – creative director, design

== Charts ==
Weekly charts
Chart (2024)	Peak position
UK Singles (OCC)	72
UK Physical Singles (OCC)	11
UK Vinyl Singles (OCC)	10
