= Misunderstood (Mötley Crüe song) =

Single by Mötley Crüe

from the album Mötley Crüe
- Released: May 1994
- Recorded: A&M Studios, Los Angeles CA, and Little Mountain Studios, Vancouver, Canada; 1993
- Genre: Hard rock
- Length: 6:53
- Label: Elektra
- Songwriters: John Corabi, Nikki Sixx, Mick Mars and Tommy Lee
- Producer: Bob Rock

Mötley Crüe singles chronology
"Hooligan's Holiday" (1994)	"Misunderstood" (1994)	"Afraid" (1997)

"Misunderstood" is a power ballad by the American heavy metal band Mötley Crüe, released on their 1994 eponymous album. The lyrics were written by vocalist/guitarist John Corabi and bassist Nikki Sixx, while the music was written by Corabi, Sixx, drummer Tommy Lee and guitarist Mick Mars. The song charted at number 24 on the Mainstream rock charts. It was the final song the band recorded with Corabi.

== Release ==
"Misunderstood" was released as a maxi-single that included three other tracks; a remix of the song, "Hooligan's Holiday" (Extended Holiday Version), the non-LP track "Hypnotized," and the album version of "Hooligan's Holiday." "Hypnotized" was later included on the Crücial Crüe edition of the album in 2003. It is their last single to feature John Corabi on vocals, as he parted ways with the band a few years after its release.

== Music video ==
A video was made to promote the single, and was directed by Brian Lockwood. The video, which featured the band playing in front of an old house while showing clips of the characters mentioned in the song, first aired in May 1994. MTV refused to air the video as there was a suicide reference in the lyrics and a man putting a pistol in his mouth in one of the scenes. This is widely believed to be a smokescreen for what was punishment for an interview with the band when the album was first released, earlier in the year. Bassist Nikki Sixx felt insulted by the MTV interviewer's line of questioning and walked out of the interview. Sixx and drummer Tommy Lee later appeared on the MTV program, Headbanger's Ball, when a third video, for the album's tenth track, "Smoke The Sky" (which featured clips from the 1936 film Reefer Madness) was filmed and also directed by Brian Lockwood. This video was aired, but only a few times. This is the band's third video to be rejected from MTV, following "Girls, Girls, Girls" and "You're All I Need".

== Background ==
"Misunderstood" was one of the first songs that the band wrote with Corabi when he joined Mötley Crüe, working out the acoustic part of the song during one of their first rehearsals together. Lyrically, the song tells a story describing the lives of several people who are dealing with the fact that life has passed them by. Glenn Hughes is featured on background vocals.

== Track listing ==
All songs written by John Corabi, Nikki Sixx, Mick Mars and Tommy Lee.

1. "Misunderstood" - (6:53)
2. "Hooligan's Holiday" (Extended Holiday Version) - (11:06)
3. "Hypnotized" - (5:29)
4. "Hooligan's Holiday" (LP Version) - (5:40)

== Charts ==
Chart (1994)	Peak position
US Mainstream Rock Airplay (Billboard)	24
