= Generation Swine =

Studio album by Mötley Crüe
- Released: June 24, 1997
- Recorded: 1995–1997
- Studios: Can-Am Recorders, Tarzana, California; Music Grinder, Hollywood, California; Conway, Hollywood, California; The Enterprise, Burbank, California; The Chop Shop, Los Angeles, California; Butt Cheese West, Los Angeles, California
- Genres: Alternative metal; alternative rock; industrial rock
- Length: 49:26; 64:06 (special edition)
- Label: Elektra
- Producers: Scott Humphrey; Nikki Sixx; Tommy Lee

Mötley Crüe chronology
| Quaternary (1994) | Generation Swine (1997) | Greatest Hits (1998) |

Singles from Generation Swine
- 1. "Afraid" Released: January 22, 1997; 2. "Beauty" Released: December 16, 1997; 3. "Glitter (Remix)" Released: 1997

Generation Swine is the seventh studio album by the American heavy metal band Mötley Crüe, released on June 24, 1997. The album marks the return of lead singer Vince Neil following his last appearance on 1991's Decade of Decadence and the last to feature drummer Tommy Lee until the 2008 album Saints of Los Angeles. It is also the band's last album to be released on Elektra Records. The album's name as well as the title track is derived from Generation of Swine by Hunter S. Thompson.

== Background ==
Following the commercial disappointment of the band's self-titled album, Mötley Crüe was under pressure from executives at Elektra Records to return Mötley Crüe to the level of commercial success that the band enjoyed in the 1980s.

The band, then officially consisting of vocalist/guitarist John Corabi, bassist Nikki Sixx, drummer Tommy Lee and guitarist Mick Mars, were so frustrated with the failure of the previous album and tour sales that they fired numerous people around the group, including longtime manager Doug Thaler and producer Bob Rock. The band then hired Allen Kovac as their new manager (given his reputation for restoring the faltering careers of other veteran acts) and started looking for another producer to work with for their next record, which was originally titled Personality #9.

After the mass firing, the band was called to a meeting with Warner Bros. CEO Doug Morris to discuss their future prospects at the label. At the meeting, Morris tried to convince Sixx and Lee to get rid of Corabi, as he wasn't a "star", and reunite with original singer Vince Neil. Sixx and Lee were not interested in the idea of working with Neil again and insisted on keeping Corabi in the group. With some additional convincing from Elektra CEO Sylvia Rhone, Morris agreed, and the band continued with their work with Corabi.

== Recording ==
Crüe returned to the studio intending to record a straight rock record that was more aggressive than the Mötley Crüe album. With Bob Rock producing, they recorded material such as "The Year I Lived in a Day" and "La Dolce Vita". The band was so excited that, according to Corabi, "At the end of each day we'd walk around the studio carrying our huge cocks in our hands because the music rocked so hard."

After Rock was fired for being "too expensive", the band eventually chose Scott Humphrey, with Sixx and Lee serving as coproducers. But the process became disorganized; Humphrey was an inexperienced producer and constantly argued with Lee and Sixx over how the album should sound. Mars' role was greatly reduced due to an ongoing feud between him and Humphrey, and Corabi grew increasingly frustrated, as he would learn and write material only to find it completely changed by the time he returned to the studio.

Mars and Corabi both claim that while Mars was very much a part of the recording sessions, virtually all of his contributions were discarded at some point. Instead, various uncredited session musicians filled in for him. Mars described the Generation Swine period as his only regret as a member of Mötley Crüe, due to this fact. "They had no respect for Mick", said Corabi of the sessions.

As the recording continued, the band was being pressured to reunite with Neil. Corabi quit the group after deciding he was tired of working under the pressure that the band and Humphrey put on him. With Corabi out, the invitation was open for Neil to return.

Neil had been busy with his solo career and the untimely death of his daughter Skylar when Kovac approached him with the idea of reuniting with Mötley, which Morris had presented to Sixx and Lee earlier. Neil, like Sixx and Lee, was against the idea, but Kovac planted the idea of a reunion in Neil's head that eventually changed his mind. After meeting with Sixx and Lee, Neil agreed to rejoin and finish the album, whose title had been changed to Generation Swine.

Musically, the album shows Mötley trying to update their image and sound, experimenting with trends such as electronica and alternative rock. The songs draw heavy influence from Cheap Trick in the first half of the record. Rick Nielsen and Robin Zander did backing vocals in some songs. Most of the album was written while Corabi was still with the band, and as such Neil had difficulty adjusting his voice to the material and sound. "There's a lot on that album that I'd have changed had I been there from the start," he remarked. "I didn't think the producer really knew what he was doing, because he wouldn't let me sing in the style I was accustomed to. He wouldn't let Mick play his usual way either. It was a nightmare."

Even with Neil back in the band, the album proved a departure from traditional Mötley albums. Besides the aforementioned experimentation, the album featured Sixx and Lee on lead vocals for the first time: Sixx on "Rocketship" (a love song for his new romance with model Donna D'Errico) and parts of "Find Myself"; and Lee on "Brandon" (a namesake song for his first-born son, and his then-current wife, Pamela Anderson) and "Beauty".

Lyrically, Generation Swine ranges from songs about drugs and prostitution such as "Find Myself" and "Beauty", to the anti-suicide stance on "Flush" and familial love on "Rocketship" and "Brandon". Lee was more involved in the writing for Generation Swine than with previous Mötley Crüe albums, and "Brandon" is described as being a heartfelt tribute to his newborn son. In negative reviews of the album, critics often made fun of the song "Brandon" for being overly sentimental. In a March 1998 interview with Spin, Sixx said that this upset him, commenting "[the critics] love it when Tommy's busted with a gun or having sex in a video, but he's not even human to them. How can you expect someone to not write about the most beautiful thing that's ever happened in his life?".

== Release and promotion ==
"Afraid" was released as the first single from the album. The video featured Hustler publisher Larry Flynt, who also put the band on the cover of an issue of Hustler that year. The song reached #10 on the US mainstream rock charts, but that too did little to generate interest in the album. The second single released was "Beauty", which reached number 37 on the mainstream rock charts; "Glitter" was also released as a single. "Find Myself" was released as a promo single and a music video was made for "Shout at the Devil '97". The band felt that the album's sluggish sales were due to Elektra not promoting the album properly, claiming that the label was only interested in promoting R&B acts. Rhone denied this claim though, stating that Mötley Crüe was a major priority for Elektra and that the label had spent a large sum of money in order to get the band to perform "Shout at the Devil '97" on the American Music Awards in January 1997.

To promote the album, Skeleteens Beverages in Pasadena, California created a soft drink for the band called "Motley Brue". The drink came in bottles that featured the new "Pig logo" and consisted of large amounts of blue #1 that turned everything blue. The intentions were to have people that drank the soft drink urinate green fluid. Mötley Crüe helped design the bottles that featured lyrics from Generation Swine songs on the reverse of each label.

The Japanese release of the album included the track "Song to Slit Your Wrist By" a song recorded by Sixx's solo project 58.

Generation Swine debuted at No. 4 on the Billboard 200, selling over 80,500 copies in its first week and was certified Gold by the RIAA on August 27, 1997. Despite the strong charting debut, the album failed to return the band to the level of critical and commercial success that had been hoped for with the reunion, and according to Nielsen SoundScan the album has sold about 306,000 copies in the U.S. to date. In 2008, singer Vince Neil stated that the album was "terrible" due to "too much experimenting".

Generation Swine would be the group's final release on Elektra Records, as the label and Mötley Crüe would break their relationship off in early 1998. Future releases from the group would come from their own Mötley Records.

== Reception ==
Professional ratings
Review scores
| Source | Rating |
|---|---|
| AllMusic | 2/5 stars |
| Chicago Tribune | 2.5/4 stars |
| Collector's Guide to Heavy Metal | 9/10 |
| Entertainment Weekly | B |
| Metal Forces | 6/10 |
| NME | 4/10 |
| Rolling Stone | 2/5 stars |
| The Rolling Stone Album Guide | 2.5/5 stars |
| Sputnikmusic | 4/5 stars |

Generation Swine received mixed reviews. "Somehow", Sixx observed in 2000, "the spin had got out there that Mötley was going to flirt with an alternative sound – that we'd sold out. Sure, it was experimental, but it wasn't alternative, techno or dance. So I was a little disappointed at the way it was received."

Sputnikmusic highlights the experimental nature of the production, which "is devoted to hard rock tracks structurally very similar to their so-called 'classic era' but sonically re-wired and approached from a direction entirely alien to the band" and praises "the vast improvement, or at the very least development, in Nikki Sixx's songwriting", finally declaring Generation Swine "a worthwhile experiment for the band that produced some of their most enduring music." David Grad of Entertainment Weekly praises Neil's voice, which lost "none of its hormonal urgency" and describes the music as a display "of highly burnished metal trumpeting the pleasures of drugs and nasty sex." Martin Popoff calls it "the summer record of '97."

In contrast, Stephen Thomas Erlewine of AllMusic calls the album "nothing short of an embarrassment" and blames the band for "simply recycling old ideas and sounds", not coming up "with any catchy riffs" and making the return of Neil "just a coincidence." Dean Golemis of the Chicago Tribune agrees, writing that despite "nose-bleeding punk runs", what transpires is the sound of a "Hollywood metal band from the '80s." Jon Wiederhorn of Rolling Stone remarks how the band tried to fuse "cornball glam-metal techniques" with "cutting-edge production and grinding industrial effects", but – instead of a "new direction that would defy expectations" – produced an album "more schizophrenic than Wesley Willis", unwelcome to Mötley fans who "crave consistency". J. D. Considine, another Rolling Stone reviewer, finds the album "as limp as overcooked spaghetti." Neil Arnold of Metal Forces calls Generation Swine "the black sheep of the Crüe family, making even the 1994 self-titled opus look brilliant" and ascribes its failure to the fusion of "industrial-fueled grooves and clanking rhythms" with the "distinctive Vince Neil whine", concluding that "'electronica' and 'alternative' are not words [he]'d associate with Mötley Crüe."

=== Legacy ===
In a 2016 Louder Sound article on the ten worst Mötley Crüe songs, they placed "Brandon" fifth, calling it "probably very touching for the people involved, including mum Pamela Anderson. But embarrassing and awkward for the rest of us." Vince Neil claimed in a 2024 interview that he has always "hated" the album. He said that producer Scott Humphrey and the other band members were "trying to reinvent themselves to be current", adding that it was derivative of contemporary artists of the time, such as Marilyn Manson, Nine Inch Nails, Rob Zombie, Ministry and Pantera.

== Lawsuit ==
On July 7, 1997, Corabi filed a $4 million lawsuit against the band for alleged breach of contract, fraud, and slander. Corabi's claim was that he had not received royalties or credit for his work and contributions while he was in the band.

Corabi was only officially credited for two songs on the original pressing of Generation Swine, "Flush" and "Let Us Prey", but claimed that he was responsible for at least 80% of the material on the album.

== Track listing ==
All lyrics are written by Nikki Sixx, except where noted. All music is composed by Nikki Sixx, except where noted.

| No. | Title | Lyrics | Music | Length |
|---|---|---|---|---|
| 1. | "Find Myself" | | Sixx; Mick Mars; Tommy Lee | 2:51 |
| 2. | "Afraid" | | | 4:07 |
| 3. | "Flush" | | Sixx; Lee; John Corabi | 5:03 |
| 4. | "Generation Swine" | | Sixx; Lee | 4:39 |
| 5. | "Confessions" | Lee | Lee; Mars | 4:21 |
| 6. | "Beauty" | Sixx; Scott Humphrey | Sixx; Lee | 3:47 |
| 7. | "Glitter" | Sixx; Bryan Adams | Sixx; Humphrey; Adams | 5:00 |
| 8. | "Anybody Out There?" | | Sixx; Lee | 1:50 |
| 9. | "Let Us Prey" | Sixx; Corabi | | 4:22 |
| 10. | "Rocketship" | | | 2:05 |
| 11. | "A Rat Like Me" | | | 4:13 |
| 12. | "Shout at the Devil '97" | | | 3:43 |
| 13. | "Brandon" | Lee | Lee | 3:25 |

Japanese edition bonus track
| No. | Title | Length |
|---|---|---|
| 14. | "Song to Slit Your Wrist By" | 3:33 |

2003 remaster bonus tracks
| No. | Title | Lyrics | Music | Length |
|---|---|---|---|---|
| 14. | "Afraid" (Swine/Jimbo Mix) | | | 3:58 |
| 15. | "Wreck Me" (previously unreleased) | Lee; Vince Neil; Mars; Sixx | Lee; Neil; Mars; Sixx | 4:19 |
| 16. | "Kiss the Sky" (previously unreleased) | Lee; Neil; Mars; Sixx; Corabi | Lee; Neil; Mars; Sixx; Corabi | 4:47 |
| 17. | "Rocketship" (early demo) | | | 1:37 |
| 18. | "Confessions" (demo with Tommy Lee on vocals) | Lee | Lee; Mars | 3:35 |
| 19. | "Afraid" (video) |

== Personnel ==
Mötley Crüe

- Vince Neil – lead vocals (on all tracks except "Rocketship" and "Brandon")
- Mick Mars – lead guitar
- Nikki Sixx – bass, backing vocals, lead vocals on "Rocketship", verse lead vocals on "Find Myself", production
- Tommy Lee – drums, piano, backing vocals, lead vocals on "Brandon", additional vocals on "Confessions" and "Beauty", production
- John Corabi – rhythm guitar (uncredited), backing vocals (uncredited)

Technical personnel

- Lenny DeRose, Brian Dobbs, Dave Ogilvie, Steve MacMillan, Marty Ogden – recording
- Brian VanPortfleet, Barry Moore, Mike Geiser, Patrick Thrasher, Patrick Shevelin, David Bryant, Brandon Harris, Bill Kinsley, Gary Winger, John Nelson, Dave Hancock – assistants
- Paul DeCarli – head programmer
- Tom Baker at Future Disk – mastering

Additional musicians

- David Darling – rhythm guitar
- Suzie Katayama – cello
- Bennet Salve – string arrangements
- David Paich – piano, harpsichord
- Scott Humphrey – synthesizer, computer programming, backing vocals, production
- Gunner Sixx (Nikki's son) – backing vocals on "Find Myself"
- Rick Nielsen and Robin Zander – backing vocals on "Glitter"

Artwork

- John Eder, William Hames, John Harrell, Dean Groover – photography
- Duke Woolsoncroft, Duke Design Co. – art direction and choreography

== Charts ==
=== Album ===
| Chart (1997) | Peak position |
|---|---|
| Australian Albums (ARIA) | 34 |
| Canadian Albums (Billboard) | 10 |
| Japanese Albums (Oricon) | 9 |
| Swedish Albums (Sverigetopplistan) | 18 |
| UK Albums (Official Charts) | 80 |
| UK Rock & Metal Albums (Official Charts) | 8 |
| US Billboard 200 | 4 |

=== Singles ===
| Year | Title | Chart | Position |
|---|---|---|---|
| 1997 | "Afraid" | Mainstream Rock (USA) | 10 |
| 1997 | "Afraid" | UK Singles Chart | 58 |
| 1997 | "Beauty" | Mainstream Rock (USA) | 37 |

== Certifications ==
| Region | Certification | Certified units/sales |
|---|---|---|
| Japan (RIAJ) | Platinum | 200,000^{^} |
| United States (RIAA) | Gold | 500,000^{^} |
^{^} Shipments figures based on certification alone.
