= Home Sweet Home (Mötley Crüe song) =

1985 single by Mötley Crüe

Single by Mötley Crüe

from the album Theatre of Pain
- B-side: "Red Hot"
- Released: September 30, 1985
- Recorded: 1985, Los Angeles
- Genre: Glam metal
- Length: 3:59
- Label: Elektra
- Songwriters: Nikki Sixx; Tommy Lee
- Producer: Tom Werman

Mötley Crüe singles chronology
"Smokin' in the Boys Room" (1985)	"Home Sweet Home" (1985)	"Girls, Girls, Girls" (1987)

Music video
- "Home Sweet Home" on YouTube

"Home Sweet Home '91"

Single by Mötley Crüe

from the album Decade of Decadence
- Released: November 1, 1991
- Recorded: 1991
- Genre: Glam metal
- Length: 4:01
- Label: Elektra
- Songwriters: Nikki Sixx; Tommy Lee
- Producer: Tom Werman

Mötley Crüe singles chronology
"Primal Scream" (1991)	"Home Sweet Home '91" (1991)	"Anarchy in the UK" (1991)

"Home Sweet Home"

Single by Mötley Crüe featuring Chester Bennington
- Released: September 27, 2005
- Recorded: 2005
- Genre: Hard rock
- Length: 4:45
- Label: Mötley
- Songwriters: Nikki Sixx; Tommy Lee

"Home Sweet Home"

Single by Mötley Crüe featuring Dolly Parton

from the album From the Beginning
- Released: June 21, 2025
- Recorded: 1985; 2025
- Genre: Glam metal
- Length: 3:51
- Label: Big Machine
- Songwriters: Nikki Sixx; Tommy Lee

Mötley Crüe singles chronology
"Cancelled" (2024)	"Home Sweet Home" (2025)

Dolly Parton singles chronology
"If You Hadn't Been There" (2025)	"Home Sweet Home" (2025)	"Broken Angels" (2025)

Music video
- "Home Sweet Home" on YouTube

"Home Sweet Home" is a power ballad by American heavy metal band Mötley Crüe. It was originally released in 1985 on the album Theatre of Pain, and again in 1991 for the Decade of Decadence 81–91 compilation album. It has been covered by several artists, most notably country singer Carrie Underwood, who released her version as a single in 2009.

== Release ==
Originally released on the band's 1985 album, Theatre of Pain, the song was accompanied by a music video which documented the band's undertakings over the course of one or several concerts. Some of the original video was shot in Houston, Texas live at The Summit during the 1985 Theatre of Pain tour. They performed the song twice that night apparently to get more video footage. "Home Sweet Home" was released and remixed twice: once for the original promotion for the single in 1985. A radio only promo 12" with the remix was sent to stations, but not released commercially until the 1988 Japan-only EP Raw Tracks.

The song was remixed again in 1991 with additional instrumental overdubs. Now called "Home Sweet Home '91", it was released as a single with a new video and included on the Decade of Decadence compilation.

The song is often referred to as a power ballad, and its success became a lucrative, marketing template for other hair bands of the late 1980s. The song ranks number 12 on VH1's list of the greatest power ballads.

Cash Box said that the song has "a slow-rocking groove and a surprisingly melodic verse and chorus", making it "a pleasant metal outing". Billboard called it a "loping rock ballad [that] is beefed up by power guitar".

In 2005, the song was re-recorded by Linkin Park vocalist Chester Bennington on co-lead vocals along with Mötley Crüe in the wake of Hurricane Katrina. The music video for the song shows videos of Katrina rescues, along with a performance from the band.

On June 21, 2025, "Home Sweet Home" was remixed into a duet with Dolly Parton for the song's 40th anniversary. A portion of the proceeds from the single and "Dölly Crüe" merchandise go to Covenant House.

== Music video ==
The video (directed by Wayne Isham and guest-starring actor Michael Berryman) begins with each band member at various locations receiving a phone call home, and replying "I'm on my way!"; Vince Neil is at a beach, Mick Mars is sitting on a throne in a haunted house, Nikki Sixx is at a bar, and Tommy Lee is at a wild party. The piano intro plays over a clip of a tour bus driving by at sunset. The rest of the video shows the band pre-concert and performing on stage, shot at The Summit in Houston (concert footage) and Reunion Arena in Dallas (exterior). The end of the video shows the same tour bus with the words "Rockin 'N' Rollin" on the marquee.

The video topped the MTV daily request chart for over three months, until MTV invoked the (unwritten) "Crue Rule", dropping videos from their request line 30 days after their MTV premiere.

== Legacy ==
A parody of this video was used for the end credits of the 2010 film Hot Tub Time Machine, with Rob Corddry's character Lou "Violator" Dorchen clothed in Vince Neil's purple vest, white tiger striped spandex and headband, with the band's name altered to "Mötley Lüe". It also parodies some of the same clips from the original video.

Drummer Tommy Lee re-recorded the song in 2011, for season four of the TV series Californication, and has a cameo in "Lights, Camera, Asshole" performing the song on piano in a bar at the end of the episode, the third episode in the show's fourth season was named for this song.

== Track listing ==
1985 single
No.	Title	Writer(s)	Length
1.	"Home Sweet Home"	Nikki Sixx; Tommy Lee	3:51
2.	"Red Hot"	Sixx; Mick Mars; Vince Neil	3:20
Total length:			7:11

1991 single
No.	Title	Writer(s)	Length
1.	"Home Sweet Home" ('91 remix)	Sixx; Lee	4:04
2.	"You're All I Need"	Sixx; Lee	4:36
3.	"Without You"	Sixx; Mars	4:30
4.	"Home Sweet Home" (original version)	Sixx; Lee	3:56
Total length:			17:05

2005 single
No.	Title	Writer(s)	Length
1.	"Home Sweet Home" (featuring Chester Bennington)	Sixx; Lee	4:45

2025 single
No.	Title	Writer(s)	Length
1.	"Home Sweet Home" (featuring Dolly Parton)	Sixx; Lee	3:51

== Personnel ==
- Vince Neil – lead vocals
- Mick Mars – guitar
- Nikki Sixx – bass, keyboards, backing vocals
- Tommy Lee – drums, piano

== Chart positions ==
The original release of "Home Sweet Home" peaked at No. 89 on the Billboard Hot 100 and No. 80 on the Cash Box Top 100. "Home Sweet Home '91" peaked at No. 37 the Billboard Hot 100 and did significantly better on the Cash Box Top 100, peaking at No. 19. As of 2025, "Home Sweet Home '91" is the last Mötley Crüe song to chart on the Billboard Hot 100.

Chart (1985–1986)	Peak position
UK Singles (Official Charts)	51
US Cash Box Top 100	19
US Billboard Hot 100	89
US Mainstream Rock (Billboard)	39

"Home Sweet Home '91"
Chart (1991)	Peak position
Australia (ARIA)	88
UK Singles (Official Charts)	37
US Cash Box Top 100	19
US Billboard Hot 100	37
US Mainstream Rock (Billboard)	41

Chart (2019)	Peak position
US Hot Rock & Alternative Songs (Billboard)	12

== Certifications ==
Region	Certification	Certified units/sales
New Zealand (RMNZ)	Gold	15,000^{‡}
United States (RIAA)	Platinum	1,000,000^{‡}
^{‡} Sales+streaming figures based on certification alone.

== Carrie Underwood version ==
"Home Sweet Home"

Single by Carrie Underwood
- Released: March 10, 2009
- Recorded: 2009
- Length: 3:38
- Label: Arista Nashville
- Songwriters: Nikki Sixx; Vince Neil; Tommy Lee
- Producer: Mark Bright

Carrie Underwood singles chronology
"I Told You So" (2009)	"Home Sweet Home" (2009)	"Cowboy Casanova" (2009)

Country singer Carrie Underwood recorded a cover version in 2009 as the contestant farewell song for the eighth season of American Idol. Underwood performed the song live on the season finale.

The song was included on the deluxe edition of her third studio album Play On, released exclusively in Australia and New Zealand. It sold 288,000 downloads in the United States.

=== Chart positions ===
Chart (2009)	Peak position
Canada Hot 100 (Billboard)	33
US Billboard Hot 100	21
US Hot Country Songs (Billboard)	52

== Justin Moore version ==
"Home Sweet Home"

Single by Justin Moore with Vince Neil

from the album Nashville Outlaws: A Tribute to Mötley Crüe
- Released: July 7, 2014
- Genre: Country
- Length: 3:51 (album version); 3:23 (single edit)
- Label: Valory
- Songwriters: Nikki Sixx; Vince Neil; Tommy Lee
- Producer: Jeremy Stover

Justin Moore singles chronology
"Small Town Throwdown" (2014)	"Home Sweet Home" (2014)	"This Kind of Town" (2014)

Justin Moore covered the song as a duet with Vince Neil on the 2014 album Nashville Outlaws: A Tribute to Mötley Crüe. It was sent to country radio on July 8, 2014. On the Country Airplay chart dated for July 19, 2014, Moore's version was the highest-debuting song of the week, entering at No. 39. The song has sold 112,000 copies in the U.S. as of September 2014. The members of Mötley Crüe make a cameo appearance in the song's promo video.

=== Chart positions ===
Chart (2014)	Peak position
US Country Airplay (Billboard)	30
US Hot Country Songs (Billboard)	28

== Other cover versions ==
- American DJ Rob Gee covered the song as "Hard Sweet Core" in 1999.
- 30 Foot Fall included a cover version of the song as a bonus track on their album Ever Revolving, Never Evolving.
- The song was also recorded by Limp Bizkit for their Greatest Hitz album, and is joined by a remake of "Bitter Sweet Symphony" by The Verve. It is often referred to as "Bittersweet Home".
- Mexican rock band Moderatto sampled the song's piano riff on their 2005 single "La mujer que no soñe".
- John Corabi, Fred Coury, and Alex Grossi covered the song on the 2007 tribute album Too Fast for Love: A Millennium Tribute to Mötley Crüe.
- Pickin' On covered the song on the 2007 tribute album Pickin' On Mötley Crüe: A Bluegrass Tribute.
- Radio Cult covered the song on their 2007 album Retroactive.
- Leif Garrett covered the song on the 2008 tribute album Crüe Believers: Tribute to Mötley Crüe.
- Rob Corddry did a cover version for the 2010 film Hot Tub Time Machine.
- Kidz Bop covered the song on the 2011 album Kidz Bop Sings Monster Ballads.
- Former American Idol contestant Todrick Hall sampled "Home Sweet Home" on his 2013 single "The Wizard of Ahhhs", a modern pop tribute to The Wizard of Oz.
- John Cena performed a piano cover of Home Sweet Home in episode six of Peacemaker in 2022. This version was arranged by John Murphy.
