= Hooligan's Holiday =

Single by Mötley Crüe

from the album Mötley Crüe
- Released: February 14, 1994
- Recorded: 1993
- Studio: A&M, Los Angeles; Little Mountain, Vancouver, Canada
- Genre: Alternative metal
- Length: 5:51
- Label: Elektra
- Composer(s): John Corabi; Nikki Sixx; Mick Mars; Tommy Lee
- Lyricist(s): John Corabi; Nikki Sixx
- Producer(s): Bob Rock

Mötley Crüe singles chronology
"Anarchy in the UK" (1991)	"Hooligan's Holiday" (1994)	"Misunderstood" (1994)

Alternative cover
- UK 12-inch single picture sleeve with a sticker of the new Mötley Crüe band logo

"Hooligan's Holiday" is a song by American heavy metal band Mötley Crüe, released on their 1994 eponymous album. The lyrics to the song were written by vocalist/rhythm guitarist John Corabi and bassist Nikki Sixx, while the music was written by Corabi, Sixx, drummer Tommy Lee and guitarist Mick Mars. It was the first song recorded by John Corabi for the album.

== Release ==
Released as a single in 1994, it was the first single that featured the band with Corabi. A video for the song was produced and received some airplay on MTV. The single was released in a variety of packages, including a CD single, 7-inch single, and a 12-inch single (which came with a sticker featuring the new band logo).

== Track listing ==
All songs written by Nikki Sixx, John Corabi, Mick Mars and Tommy Lee.

1. "Hooligan's Holiday" (Brown Nose Edit)
2. "Hooligan's Holiday" (LP version)
3. "Hypnotized"

== Remixes ==
A remix version by Skinny Puppy was produced in 1994 and was released on the rarities album Supersonic and Demonic Relics.

== Other appearances ==
"Hooligan's Holiday" also on the following Mötley Crüe compilation albums:

- Supersonic and Demonic Relics
- Red, White & Crüe

== Charts ==
Chart performance for "Hooligan's Holiday"
Chart (1994)	Peak position
Australia (ARIA)	60
Sweden (Sverigetopplistan)	34
UK Singles (OCC)	36
US Mainstream Rock (Billboard)	10
