= Mötley Crüe (album) =

Studio album by Mötley Crüe
- Released: March 15, 1994
- Recorded: 1992–1993
- Studios: A&M, Hollywood; Little Mountain, Vancouver
- Genres: Heavy metal; alternative metal; hard rock; grunge
- Length: 60:23
- Label: Elektra
- Producer: Bob Rock

Mötley Crüe chronology
Decade of Decadence 81-91 (1991)	Mötley Crüe (1994)	Quaternary (1994)

Singles from Mötley Crüe
- 1. "Hooligan's Holiday" Released: February 1994; 2. "Misunderstood" Released: May 1994

Mötley Crüe is the sixth studio album by American heavy metal band Mötley Crüe. It was released on March 15, 1994. It was the band's only album released with singer John Corabi, and was the first album of new material released by the band since their 1989 album, Dr. Feelgood.

The album was recorded under the working title of Til Death Do Us Part, and featured a shift in musical style away from the glam metal sound that brought them fame in the 1980s, and showed influences of grunge and alternative metal. as the first release by the band after signing a $25 million contract with Elektra Records. Sales were disappointing compared to the band's earlier albums, and critical reviews were mixed

== Background ==
Following the success of the Dr. Feelgood and Decade of Decadence albums and tours, the members of Mötley Crüe were tired and needed to take a break from the non-stop pressures of the road. Instead of being given a break, the band, then consisting of bassist Nikki Sixx, drummer Tommy Lee, guitarist Mick Mars and singer Vince Neil, had returned to the studio to begin work on the follow-up album to their 1989 album Dr. Feelgood on a two-week-on, two-week-off schedule. While working on new material in the studio in early 1992, Sixx, Lee and Mars had a falling out with Neil that led to the singer quitting or being fired from the band, effectively leaving Mötley Crüe without a frontman.

Meanwhile, John Corabi was the vocalist of the Los Angeles-based hard rock band the Scream when he read an interview that featured Sixx in an issue of Spin magazine. In the interview, Corabi found out that Sixx was a big fan of the Scream's first record, Let It Scream. Corabi wanted to get in contact with Sixx and thank him for the compliment, as well as possibly opening the door for collaborating with Sixx on material for the next Scream album, so he had his manager get the number to Mötley Crüe's manager, Doug Thaler. After speaking to Thaler's secretary, Corabi was told to leave his phone number so that Sixx could get in contact with him. Not thinking much of it, Corabi left his number and continued with his responsibilities with the Scream.

After receiving a phone call from Sixx and Lee, where they informed Corabi that Neil was no longer in the band, he was invited to audition. After a couple of sessions, the band told Corabi that he was their choice for Neil's replacement, but told him to keep quiet about it until they were able to work out some pending legal technicalities, as Elektra Records could have possibly reneged on the band's new contract if the label knew Neil was gone.

== Recording ==
"Hooligan's Holiday"
The first single released by Mötley Crüe to feature John Corabi on vocals

For the recording of the album, Mötley Crüe reunited with Bob Rock, who had produced Dr. Feelgood, their most commercially successful album. With Corabi now fronting the band, the members took advantage of the fact that he brought more to the table than Neil did: Sixx had never worked with another lyricist before, and Mars had never played with another guitarist. Mars noted that working with a second guitarist gave him "a chance to experiment and have some fun instead of having to focus on just keeping the rhythm." Also, the band had never previously written songs through jamming. One of the first songs Corabi worked with the band on was "Hammered", as well as the acoustic portion of the song that would become "Misunderstood."

During the recording of the album, the band members committed to sobriety, with a strict regimen of no drugs, alcohol, cigarettes, red meat or caffeine. The band worked with a physical trainer each morning, and took vitamin pills to keep their bodies nourished. Although there were occasional slips off the wagon, the members were determined to repeat the success of Dr. Feelgood. The recording sessions proved to be fruitful, with a total of 24 songs written and recorded over the 10-month recording span.

== Composition and lyrics ==
Motley Crue was an adaption to a changing music scene of the early 1990s, abandoning glam metal for a more aggressive and abrasive sound influenced by heavy metal, alternative metal, hard rock and grunge. The lead single "Hooligan's Holiday" draws influence from grunge bands, such as Pearl Jam and Soundgarden, and is considered alternative metal, while the second single, "Misunderstood", has acoustic parts and is considered a power ballad.

John Corabi's influence pushed the band's lyrics away from their usual themes of sex and rebellion. Sixx enjoyed working with Corabi on the lyrics, feeling the singer’s "normal" lyrics balanced out his own "demented" lyrics. Songs such as "Power to the Music" and "Droppin' Like Flies" were attempts at introspection and commentary on the state of the world, including then-current events such as the 1992 Los Angeles riots, and music censorship. The song "Uncle Jack" was about Corabi's uncle, a convicted child molester, and "Misunderstood" was a song about people who were trying to deal with the fact that life had "passed them by". Some songs still had more familiar themes, including "Smoke the Sky," which was about marijuana use, and "Poison Apples", which was about the decadent Rock 'N Roll lifestyle that the band was famous for living.

== Artwork ==
There are two different versions of the cover, which features the band's name on a scratched black background. One version features the band name colored red and the other colored yellow (which is shown above). Both versions were released simultaneously. On the inside, the CD tray features a white circle showing a fist with the word "CRUE" on its fingers emerging from a black circle with an open space on the right side. The CD shows the same thing but drawn differently. Some editions have the CD showing the circle and fist drawn the same way as on the inlay. The back of the booklet shows part of the word "Listen" which is either colored red or yellow, depending on the version. The red version of the album is more common, as the yellow version is currently out of print.

== Release and promotion ==
Mötley Crüe debuted at No. 7 on the Billboard 200 and was certified Gold by the RIAA on May 3, 1994. However, five years had passed since Mötley had released a full studio album, and much had changed in popular music. Grunge and alternative rock had crossed into the mainstream, and many hard rock and glam metal acts from the 1980s struggled to generate sales. After charting in the Top 10, the album slid down quickly and ultimately failed to sell as well as previous Mötley albums.

"I've never heard that album," Neil claimed in 2000. "I just had no interest. It was a direction that I didn't agree with."

While there was an expected backlash from fans toward the album after the popular Neil's departure, other factors contributed to the poor sales. Besides the aforementioned shift in popular music, the band fell out with MTV: Sixx threatened to knock the host's teeth out during an interview, as he felt the line of questioning was "stupid". He and the rest of the band walked out mid-interview. Executives from the Elektra and Warner Bros. labels were not supporting the band either, as many executives prioritized boardroom wars related to the CEO change of Bob Krasnow to Sylvia Rhone. With no support from their label, and no promotion from MTV following the disastrous interview, the subsequent tour was scaled back from stadiums and arenas to theaters to clubs until it was eventually cancelled.

== Critical reception ==
Professional ratings
Review scores
Source	Rating
AllMusic	2/5 stars
Chicago Tribune	2/4 stars
Collector's Guide to Heavy Metal	8/10
Entertainment Weekly	B
Los Angeles Times	3/4 stars
Metal Forces	7/10
Rolling Stone	3/5 stars
The Rolling Stone Album Guide	3.5/5 stars

Mötley Crüe received mixed reviews. In general, critics remarked how the band had adapted their trademark sound to the new trends of grunge and alternative metal. According to Neil Arnold of Metal Forces, this change of style misrepresents the band, which he felt "should have gone under a different name" for this album. New vocalist John Corabi's vocal range and soulful performance were praised in several reviews, as they were seen as more suited to the new sound of the band. For Katherine Turman of The Los Angeles Times his "voice is meatier and more appealing than predecessor Vince Neil's" and may be responsible for the shift in focus towards a less flashy style. However, Arion Berger of Rolling Stone defined the music "samey", while Chuck Eddy in his review for Entertainment Weekly appreciated the ballads, but called the album's heavy tracks "an overbearing plod". Stephen Thomas Erlewine of Allmusic gage the album 2 stars out of a possible 5, saying Corabi lacked the charisma of Vince Neill, and also believed the dour, mediocre songs led to the album being "the weakest effort in their catalog".

=== Legacy ===
In July 2014, Guitar World ranked Mötley Crüe at number 25 in their "Superunknown: 50 Iconic Albums That Defined 1994" list. In November 2022, Rolling Stone marked the firing of Neil and making of the album as the 22nd worst decision in music history, stating "by the time they reemerged with a self-titled LP in 1994, grunge was already on its way out. They seemed like visitors from another eon, and their tour to support the album played to oceans of empty seats".

== Track listing ==
All lyrics are written by John Corabi and Nikki Sixx; all music is composed by Corabi, Sixx, Mick Mars, and Tommy Lee, except "Poison Apples" (Corabi, Sixx, Mars, Lee, Bob Rock).

No.	Title	Length
1.	"Power to the Music"	5:12
2.	"Uncle Jack"	5:28
3.	"Hooligan's Holiday"	5:51
4.	"Misunderstood"	6:53
5.	"Loveshine"	2:36
6.	"Poison Apples"	3:40
7.	"Hammered"	5:15
8.	"Til Death Do Us Part"	6:03
9.	"Welcome to the Numb"	5:18
10.	"Smoke the Sky"	3:36
11.	"Droppin' Like Flies"	6:26
12.	"Driftaway"	4:00

2003 remaster bonus tracks
No.	Title	Length
13.	"Hypnotized" (single B-side)	5:29
14.	"Babykills" (from the Quaternary EP)	5:24
15.	"Livin' in the No" (from the Nippon Edition of the Quaternary EP)	4:23

== Personnel ==
=== Mötley Crüe ===
- John Corabi – lead vocals, acoustic guitar, rhythm guitar, six-string bass
- Mick Mars – lead guitar, six-string bass, sitar, mandolin, backing vocals
- Nikki Sixx – bass, piano, backing vocals
- Tommy Lee – drums, piano, backing vocals

=== Guest musicians ===
- Scott Humphrey – programming/synths
- Glenn Hughes – backing vocals on "Misunderstood"
- Marc Lafrance, Dave Steele – backing vocals
- Hook Herrera – harmonica
- Sammy Sanchez – mandolin
- members of the Vancouver Symphony Orchestra and the Vancouver Opera Orchestra
- Akira Nagai – concertmaster

=== Production ===
- Bob Rock – producer, mixing, acoustic guitar, rhythm guitar, mandolin
- Randy Staub – engineer, mixing
- Brian Dobbs, Ed Korengo, Darren Grahn, Jim Labinski, Bill Kennedy, Kim Lomas, Roger Monk, Ken Villeneuve, Greg Goldman – additional engineers
- George Marino – mastering
- Bob Buckley – orchestral arrangements and conduction

== Charts ==
=== Album ===
Chart (1994)	Peak position
Australian Albums (ARIA)	3
Austrian Albums (Ö3 Austria)	25
Canada Top Albums/CDs (RPM)	9
Finnish Albums (The Official Finnish Charts)	15
French Albums (SNEP)	28
German Albums (Offizielle Top 100)	55
Japanese Albums (Oricon)	5
New Zealand Albums (RMNZ)	28
Scottish Albums (Official Charts)	37
Swedish Albums (Sverigetopplistan)	6
Swiss Albums (Schweizer Hitparade)	21
UK Albums (Official Charts)	17
US Billboard 200	7

=== Singles ===
Year	Title	Chart	Position
1994	"Hooligan's Holiday"	Mainstream Rock (US)	10
1994	"Hooligan's Holiday"	Swedish Singles Chart	34
1994	"Hooligan's Holiday"	UK Singles Chart	36
1994	"Misunderstood"	Mainstream Rock (US)	24

== Certifications ==
Region	Certification	Certified units/sales
Japan (RIAJ)	Gold	100,000^{^}
United States (RIAA)	Gold	500,000^{^}
^{^} Shipments figures based on certification alone.
