= Stairway to Heaven/Highway to Hell =

Make a Difference Foundation: Stairway To Heaven/Highway To Hell

Compilation album by Various artists
- Released: November 1989
- Recorded: 1989
- Genre: Glam metal; heavy metal
- Length: 45:52
- Label: Mercury
- Producer: Bruce Fairbairn

Professional ratings
Review scores
Source	Rating
AllMusic	3/5 stars

Stairway to Heaven/Highway to Hell was a 1989 compilation album featuring bands that performed at the Moscow Music Peace Festival: Bon Jovi, Skid Row, Scorpions, Ozzy Osbourne, Mötley Crüe, Cinderella, and Gorky Park. The album closes with a few collaborative efforts including a cover of Led Zeppelin's "Moby Dick" and a live medley of songs from Elvis Presley and Led Zeppelin.

The album was released by the Make a Difference Foundation, a nonprofit group formed by executive producer Doc McGhee, which fought youth alcohol and drug abuse. Album proceeds were split between Make a Difference and the Soviet Union's All-Union Society for Sobriety. Each song is a cover of a famous solo artist or rock band who had suffered a drug- or alcohol-related death. The album's liner notes include an extensive dedication list of such artists, along with a skeleton playing the guitar.

Billboard magazine cited the album as "New and Noteworthy" after its release, describing it as, "Glittering array of headbangers assemble for one of the must-have collections of the season."

The album title meshes the song titles of "Stairway to Heaven" by Led Zeppelin and "Highway to Hell" by AC/DC. Although neither track appears on the album, both Led Zeppelin drummer John Bonham and AC/DC singer Bon Scott had alcohol-related deaths in 1980.

== Track listing ==
No.	Title	Writer(s)	Original artist	Length
1.	"My Generation" (Gorky Park)	Pete Townshend	The Who	4:46
2.	"Holidays in the Sun" (Skid Row)	Paul Cook, Steve Jones, Glen Matlock, Johnny Rotten	Sex Pistols	3:35
3.	"I Can't Explain" (Scorpions)	Pete Townshend	The Who	3:21
4.	"Purple Haze" (Ozzy Osbourne)	Jimi Hendrix	The Jimi Hendrix Experience	4:21
5.	"Teaser" (Mötley Crüe)	Tommy Bolin, Jeff Cook	Tommy Bolin	5:18
6.	"The Boys Are Back in Town" (Bon Jovi)	Phil Lynott	Thin Lizzy	4:03
7.	"Move Over" (Cinderella)	Janis Joplin	Janis Joplin	3:24
8.	"Moby Dick" (Drum Madness)	John Bonham, John Paul Jones, Jimmy Page	Led Zeppelin	5:54
9.	"Hound Dog"	Jerry Leiber, Mike Stoller	Big Mama Thornton	3:19
10.	"Long Tall Sally/Blue Suede Shoes"	Robert "Bumps" Blackwell, Enotris Johnson, Richard Penniman/Carl Perkins	Little Richard/Carl Perkins	3:02
11.	"Rock & Roll"	John Bonham, John Paul Jones, Jimmy Page, Robert Plant	Led Zeppelin	4:49
Total length:				45:52
