= Without You (Mötley Crüe song) =

Single by Mötley Crüe

from the album Dr. Feelgood
- B-side: "Slice Of Your Pie"
- Released: February 1990
- Recorded: 1988–1989
- Genre: Glam metal; soft rock
- Length: 4:29
- Label: Elektra
- Songwriters: Nikki Sixx, Mick Mars
- Producer: Bob Rock

Mötley Crüe singles chronology
"Kickstart My Heart" (1989)	"Without You" (1990)	"Don't Go Away Mad (Just Go Away)" (1990)

Music video
- "Without You" on YouTube

"Without You" is a song by American heavy metal band Mötley Crüe. A power ballad, it was released in February 1990 by Elektra Records, as the third single from their fifth studio album, Dr. Feelgood (1989). It is written by Nikki Sixx and Mick Mars, and produced by Bob Rock. The song peaked at numbers seven and eight on the US Cash Box Top 100 and Billboard Hot 100 charts. The accompanying music video was directed by Mary Lambert.

== Background ==
The song features Mick Mars playing a steel guitar during the intro and the solo, a clean electric guitar arpeggio on the verses and bridge, and various licks on a distorted electric guitar throughout. In the Dr. Feelgood album's liner notes, the composition is said to be about Tommy Lee's relationship with Heather Locklear.

== Music video ==
The music video for "Without You" was shot at the Grand 1894 Opera House in Galveston, Texas on January 15, 1990, following Mötley Crüe's Houston concert. Produced by Sharon Oreck through O Pictures and photographed by Bill Pope, "Without You" is the first of two Crüe videos to be directed by Mary Lambert under the alias "Blanche White" ("blanche" meaning "white" in French). Lambert's original idea for the video was "to do a motorcycle movie" but Mötley Crüe objected, as they had done that before (in the music video for "Girls, Girls, Girls"). The final clip, which was described by Nikki Sixx as having a very "surreal" touch to it, includes various abstract images, a live jaguar (Czar from the Exotic Cat Refuge and Wildlife Orphanage in Kirbyville), a cello ensemble playing during the slide solo, and the band playing in an Ancient Egypt-fashioned scenario. Traces of Persian cultural tradition are present in the last few seconds of the studio release.

== Personnel ==
Mötley Crüe

- Vince Neil – lead vocals
- Mick Mars – guitar
- Nikki Sixx – bass
- Tommy Lee – drums, percussion

Additional musicians

- Mark LaFrance – backing vocals

== Chart performance ==
Released as the album's third single in 1990, "Without You" reached numbers seven and eight on the US Cash Box Top 100 and Billboard Hot 100 charts, and number eleven on the Billboard Mainstream Rock chart, as well as number 39 on the UK Singles Chart.

== Charts ==
=== Weekly charts ===
Chart (1990)	Position
Australia (ARIA)	46
UK Singles (Official Charts)	39
US Billboard Hot 100	8
US Mainstream Rock (Billboard)	11
US Cash Box Top 100	7

=== Year-end charts ===
Chart (1990)	Position
US Top Pop Singles (Billboard)	96
