= Same Ol' Situation (S.O.S.) =

Single by Mötley Crüe

from the album Dr. Feelgood
- Released: July 31, 1990
- Recorded: 1988–1989
- Genre: Glam metal
- Length: 4:14
- Label: Elektra
- Songwriters: Nikki Sixx; Mick Mars; Vince Neil; Tommy Lee
- Producer: Bob Rock

Mötley Crüe singles chronology
| "Don't Go Away Mad (Just Go Away)" (1990) | "Same Ol' Situation (S.O.S.)" (1990) | "Primal Scream" (1991) |

"Same Ol' Situation (S.O.S.)" is a song by American heavy metal band Mötley Crüe, released in July 1990 by Elektra Records, as the fifth single from their fifth studio album, Dr. Feelgood (1989). The song is written by Nikki Sixx, Mick Mars, Vince Neil and Tommy Lee, and produced by Bob Rock. It peaked at numbers 50 and 78 on the US Cash Box Top 100 and Billboard Hot 100 charts, and at number 34 on the Billboard Mainstream Rock charts. The accompanying music video was directed by Wayne Isham and shot on July 7, 1990 during a concert at the Alpine Valley Music Theatre. It is dedicated to the band's fans. According to VH1 Classic All-Time Top 10, the song is about lesbianism.

== Theme ==
The song tells a story about a boy meeting two girls, and in the end, the two women end up together.

== Personnel ==
Mötley Crüe

- Vince Neil – lead vocals
- Mick Mars – guitar
- Nikki Sixx – bass
- Tommy Lee – drums, percussion

Additional musicians

- Mark LeFrance – backing vocals
- Emi Canyn – backing vocals
- Donna McDaniel – backing vocals
- Jack Blades – backing vocals

== Charts ==
| Chart (1990) | Peak position |
|---|---|
| US Billboard Hot 100 | 78 |
| US Mainstream Rock Airplay (Billboard) | 34 |
| US Cash Box Top 100 | 50 |
