= Don't Go Away Mad (Just Go Away) =

1990 single by Mötley Crüe

- US commercial cassette single. Cover art by Mort Drucker.

Single by Mötley Crüe

from the album Dr. Feelgood
- B-side: "Rattlesnake Shake"
- Released: May 28, 1990
- Recorded: 1988–1989
- Studio: Little Mountain Sound Studios, Vancouver, Canada
- Genre: Glam metal; hard rock
- Length: 4:40
- Label: Elektra
- Songwriters: Nikki Sixx, Mick Mars
- Producer: Bob Rock

Mötley Crüe singles chronology
"Without You" (1990)	"Don't Go Away Mad (Just Go Away)" (1990)	"Same Ol' Situation (S.O.S.)" (1990)

Alternative covers
- CD single cover

"Don't Go Away Mad (Just Go Away)" is a song by American heavy metal band Mötley Crüe. It is the tenth track from their fifth studio album, Dr. Feelgood (1989), and was released as the album's fourth single in May 1990 by Elektra Records. It peaked at numbers 15 and 19 on the US Cash Box Top 100 and Billboard Hot 100 charts, and number 13 on the Billboard Mainstream rock charts.

Bassist Nikki Sixx told Rolling Stone: "I saw that line in a movie somewhere, I can't even remember what movie. I thought, 'Great idea for a song.' A little tongue in cheek. A little sarcasm there." Vocalist Vince Neil added: "I love to play guitar and sing that song. It's kind of a feel-good song. When that song comes on everybody wants to sing along with you." This song also contains lyrical references to 1984's "Too Young to Fall in Love". The phrase "Don't go away mad, just go away" is also used in the song "Just Go Away" on Blondie's 1978 album Parallel Lines.

== Music video ==
The music video for "Don't Go Away Mad (Just Go Away)" shows Neil leaving New York City to join his bandmates in Los Angeles for rehearsal. Produced by Sharon Oreck through O Pictures, "Don't Go Away Mad" is the second of two Crüe videos to be directed by Mary Lambert under the alias "Blanche White" ("blanche" meaning "white" in French).

The song's video was placed on The New York Times' list of the 15 Essential Hair-Metal Videos.

== Reception ==
In Guitar World's "Top 20 Hair Metal Albums" article, the reviewer said that “Don’t Go Away Mad (Just Go Away)”, along with “Dr. Feelgood”, “Kickstart My Heart”, and “She Goes Down”, were, "as good as pop metal ever got."

== Personnel ==
Mötley Crüe

- Vince Neil – lead vocals
- Mick Mars – guitar
- Nikki Sixx – bass guitar
- Tommy Lee – drums, percussion

Additional musicians

- Mark LeFrance – backing vocals
- David Steele – backing vocals
- Emi Canyn – backing vocals
- Donna McDaniel – backing vocals

== Charts ==
Chart performance for "Don't Go Away Mad (Just Go Away)"
Chart (1990)	Peak position
Australia (ARIA)	72
New Zealand (Recorded Music NZ)	49
US Billboard Hot 100	19
US Mainstream Rock Airplay (Billboard)	13
US Cash Box Top 100	15
