= Shout at the Devil (song) =

1983 song by Mötley Crüe

Single by Mötley Crüe

from the album Shout at the Devil
- Released: September 23, 1983
- Recorded: 1983
- Studio: Cherokee (Hollywood)
- Genre: Heavy metal, glam metal
- Length: 3:16
- Label: Elektra
- Songwriter: Nikki Sixx
- Producer: Tom Werman

Mötley Crüe singles chronology
"Live Wire" (1982)	"Shout at the Devil" (1983)	"Looks That Kill" (1984)

"Shout at the Devil" is a song by American heavy metal band Mötley Crüe. Written by bassist Nikki Sixx, the song is the title track of their album of the same name. The song charted at No. 30 on the U.S. Mainstream Rock chart.

"Shout at the Devil '97"

Song by Mötley Crüe

from the album Generation Swine
- Released: 1997
- Recorded: 1996
- Genre: Industrial metal
- Length: 3:43
- Label: Elektra
- Songwriter: Nikki Sixx
- Producer: Scott Humphrey

== Background ==
The song has been described as a heavy, riff-driven rocker with a dark tone. Like many other heavy metal songs, it stirred controversy for allegations that it encouraged devil worship.

The song was re-recorded by the band for their 1997 album Generation Swine, titled "Shout at the Devil '97".

== Charts ==
Chart	Peak position
US Mainstream Rock (Billboard)	30
US Hot Rock & Alternative Songs (Billboard)	23

== Certifications ==
Region	Certification	Certified units/sales
United States (RIAA)	Gold	500,000^{‡}
^{‡} Sales+streaming figures based on certification alone.
