= Live Wire (Mötley Crüe song) =

Single by Mötley Crüe

from the album Too Fast for Love
- Released: August 16, 1982
- Recorded: 1981
- Genre: Glam metal; speed metal
- Length: 3:15
- Label: Leathür
- Songwriter: Nikki Sixx

Mötley Crüe singles chronology
"Stick to Your Guns" (1981)	"Live Wire" (1982)	"Shout at the Devil" (1983)

Music videos
- "Live Wire" on YouTube

"Live Wire" is the second single by the American heavy metal band Mötley Crüe. It was released on their 1981 debut album Too Fast for Love.

In 2015, "Sleazegrinder" of Louder included the song in his list of "The 20 Greatest Hair Metal Anthems Of All Time".

== Overview ==
The video was directed by the members of Mötley Crüe. It showcases the band's stage theatrics, such as Nikki Sixx setting himself on fire (due to lack of money to perform on stage pyrotechnics) and Mick Mars drooling blood. The single was released on August 16, 1982. In May 2006, it was ranked #17 on VH1's list of the 40 greatest metal songs of all time.

The song was remixed in 1991 alongside "Piece of Your Action" for the compilation album Decade of Decadence.

== Cover versions ==
In 1997, American post-hardcore band BoySetsFire covered the song on their debut album "The Day the Sun Went Out". In 2000, fellow heavy metal band Fozzy covered this song for their debut self-titled album. Swedish hardcore punk band Refused included a cover in their The Demo Compilation. In 2010, Japanese rock band Vamps covered it as the B-side to their single "Devil Side". Meghan Kabir recorded a slow version of the song for Mötley Crüe's 2019 biopic The Dirt.

In 2014, The Cadillac Three covered the song on Nashville Outlaws: A Tribute to Mötley Crüe released via Big Machine Records.

== Personnel ==
- Vince Neil – lead vocals
- Mick Mars – guitars, backing vocals
- Nikki Sixx – bass
- Tommy Lee – drums, backing vocals

== In popular culture ==
"Live Wire" appears in the soundtracks to the video games Tony Hawk's American Wasteland, Brütal Legend, Saints Row: The Third, and NBA 2K20. The song also appears on the soundtrack to Charlie's Angels. It also appears in the Netflix original film The Dirt which is about Mötley Crüe's history.

== Charts ==
Chart (2019)	Peak position
US Hot Rock & Alternative Songs (Billboard)	24

== Certifications ==
Region	Certification	Certified units/sales
United States (RIAA)	Gold	500,000^{‡}
^{‡} Sales+streaming figures based on certification alone.
