= Primal Scream (song) =

Single by Mötley Crüe

from the album Decade of Decadence 81–91
- Released: September 23, 1991
- Recorded: 1990–1991
- Genre: Heavy metal, hard rock, glam metal
- Length: 4:48
- Label: Elektra
- Songwriter: Nikki Sixx
- Producer: Bob Rock

Mötley Crüe singles chronology
| "Same Ol' Situation (S.O.S.)" (1990) | "Primal Scream" (1991) | "Home Sweet Home '91" (1991) |

"Primal Scream" is a song by the American heavy metal band Mötley Crüe. The single was released on the 1991 album Decade of Decadence 81–91, which was the band's first of many greatest hits compilations. The song charted at No. 63 on Billboard Hot 100 and No. 21 on the Mainstream Rock chart. Decade of Decadence was released on October 19, 1991, and "Primal Scream" was one of three newly recorded songs for the album, the other two being "Angela" and "Anarchy in the U.K.".

== Background ==
The uncensored version of a "Primal Scream" music video contained full-frontal nudity of a female dancing at the end, but that scene was edited for heavy rotation when shown on television.

The song was said by Nikki Sixx himself in an AskSixx session on Twitter in October 1, 2015, to be about Arthur Janov's 1970 book The Primal Scream. Primal Therapy: A Cure For Neurosis, as well as his own childhood.

Decade of Decadence also included another single, the remix version of "Home Sweet Home" which was the band's eighth and final Top 40 hit in 1991, reaching No. 37 on the Billboard Hot 100. The original 1985 version only reached No. 89 on the same chart.

== Personnel ==
- Vince Neil – vocals
- Mick Mars – guitar
- Nikki Sixx – bass guitar
- Tommy Lee – drums

== Charts ==
| Chart (1991) | Peak position |
|---|---|
| UK Singles (Official Charts) | 26 |
| US Billboard Hot 100 | 63 |
| US Mainstream Rock (Billboard) | 21 |
| Australia (ARIA) | 29 |
| New Zealand (Recorded Music NZ) | 30 |
