= Viva! Hysteria (residency) =

2013 concert residency by Def Leppard

- Residency by Def Leppard
- Official promo poster
- Location: Paradise, Nevada
- Venue: The Joint
- Associated album: Hysteria
- Start date: 22 March 2013
- End date: 13 April 2013
- No. of shows: 11

Def Leppard concert chronology
- Rock of Ages Tour (2012); Viva! Hysteria (2013); Summer Tour 2013 (2013)

Viva! Hysteria was a concert residency by English rock band Def Leppard where the band played their 1987 album Hysteria in its entirety. Held at The Joint at the Hard Rock Hotel and Casino on the Las Vegas Strip in Paradise, Nevada, the residency spanned eleven shows in March and April 2013. The shows on 29 and 30 March were recorded for the live album Viva! Hysteria, released on 22 October 2013.

== Concert dates ==
- Friday 22 March 2013
- Saturday 23 March 2013
- Wednesday 27 March 2013
- Friday 29 March 2013
- Saturday 30 March 2013
- Wednesday 3 April 2013
- Friday 5 April 2013
- Saturday 6 April 2013
- Wednesday 10 April 2013
- Friday 12 April 2013
- Saturday 13 April 2013

== Setlists ==
=== Opening setlists ===
All 11 nights, the band opened with a distinct setlist of mostly deep cuts. They performed as the fictitious Ded Flatbird, and dubbed themselves as "The world's greatest Def Leppard cover band."

Song	Nights	Ded Flatbird setlist										
Song	Nights	22 March	23 March	27 March	29 March	30 March	3 April	5 April	6 April	10 April	12 April	13 April
"Good Morning Freedom"	4	1			1				1		1	
"Wasted"	6	2			2		5		2	8	7	
"Mirror, Mirror (Look Into My Eyes)"	6	3		2	4			3		5		2
"Foolin'"	5	4	6				3	4		3		
"Promises"	6	5		6	9			5	7	6		
"When Love & Hate Collide"	4	6		4	5						6	
"Let It Go"	5	7				3		1		4		3
"Slang"	4	8				2			6		3	
"Bringin' On the Heartbreak"	4	9				6		7				6
"Switch 625"	4	10				7		8				7
"High 'n' Dry (Saturday Night)"	4		1			5			3			5
"Action"	4		2		6			2		2		
"Another Hit And Run"	4		3			4			4			4
"Too Late For Love"	4		4				4		5		4	
"Make Love Like a Man"	3		5				7			7		
"Let's Get Rocked"	4		7				8		8		8	
"On Through The Night"	3			1		1						1
"C'mon, C'mon"	2			3				6				
"Rock Brigade"	4			5	7		6				2	
"Rock! Rock! (Till You Drop)"	3			7			1			1		
"Undefeated"	2			8	8							
"Stagefright"	2				3		2					
"Rock On"	1										5	

=== Hysteria setlist and encore ===
Each night after intermission, Def Leppard came back to perform Hysteria in its entirety. This started with Phil Collen on an elevated platform playing the intro to "Women". An important note is that these were the first shows to feature the band playing the whole album front to back. Accordingly, they played the songs in a true-to-album style. Notably, "Rocket" was neither the extended (Lunar mix) nor shortened (single/visualize edit) versions which have been played on recent tours, but a 2013 vintage of the Hysteria album version of the song, while "Pour Some Sugar On Me" was played with the original "Step inside, walk this way" intro as heard on the Hysteria album. Every night, the band played the same encore of its two biggest Pyromania hits, "Rock of Ages", and "Photograph".

1. "Women"
2. "Rocket"
3. "Animal"
4. "Love Bites"
5. "Pour Some Sugar on Me"
6. "Armageddon It"
- Steve Clark guitar solo from Live: In the Round, in Your Face on a screen.
7. "Gods Of War"
8. "Don't Shoot Shotgun"
9. "Run Riot"
10. "Hysteria"
11. "Excitable"
12. "Love and Affection"

Encore

13. "Rock of Ages"
14. "Photograph"

== Personnel ==
- Joe Elliott – lead vocals; also performed as his Ded Flatbird alias "Booty Reuben"
- Rick Savage – bass, backing vocals; also performed as his Ded Flatbird alias "Fleetwood Beck"
- Phil Collen – guitar, backing vocals; also performed as his Ded Flatbird alias "Chingy Chapman"
- Vivian Campbell – guitar, backing vocals; also performed as his Ded Flatbird alias "Linkin Twain"
- Rick Allen – drums; also performed as his Ded Flatbird alias "Camp Out"
