= Mirror Ball – Live & More =

Live album by Def Leppard
- Released: 3 June 2011
- Recorded: 2008–2011
- Venue: Various venues worldwide during the "Sparkle Lounge" Tour 2008/2009
- Studio: Joe's Garage, Dublin, Ireland, Phil's Sweat Shop and Rick's Place, California, USA
- Genre: Heavy metal; hard rock; glam metal
- Length: 119:16
- Label: Bludgeon Riffola/Mailboat: Frontiers (Europe)
- Producer: Ronan McHugh; Def Leppard

Def Leppard chronology
Songs from the Sparkle Lounge (2008)	Mirror Ball – Live & More (2011)	Viva! Hysteria (2013)

Singles from Mirror Ball – Live & More
- 1. "Undefeated" Released: April 2011; 2. "It's All About Believin" Released: May 2012

Professional ratings
Review scores
Source	Rating
AllMusic	3.5/5 stars

Mirror Ball – Live & More is a double live album by English rock band Def Leppard initially released on 3 June 2011 in Germany, Switzerland, and Austria, then in the rest of Europe on 6 June, and in North America on 7 June. The first stand-alone live album released by the band, it contains live recordings, three new studio tracks and a DVD containing both concert and backstage footage.

== Background ==
The album was announced on 22 February 2011, but almost a month earlier, on 26 January 2011, Phil Collen said in an interview with WNCX that the band had already written and started recording the new songs, and said the album was planned to be released in May 2011. Release dates and the album's artwork were announced on 13 April 2011, with the album being sold exclusively thru Wal-Mart and Sam's Club in the US.

The album includes three new studio songs along with the live recordings, taken during 2008 and 2009. The new tracks include the singles "Undefeated", composed by Joe Elliott, who described it as "a big, epic, rock anthem...kind of 'We Will Rock You' with guitars," as well as "It's All About Believin'," by Phil Collen and "Kings of the World," by Rick Savage and described by Elliott as having "a very Queen-type vocal thing," The complete track listing was announced on 7 April 2011. "Undefeated" charted at number 26 on the Billboard Heritage Rock charts.

During its first week on sale, the album sold approximately 20,000 copies in the United States, charting at number sixteen on the Billboard 200.

AllMusic gave Mirror Ball – Live & More a rating of three and a half out of five stars, noting the change in Joe Elliott's voice, "from a metallic screech into a coarse croon," and saying that the album was "far better than most fans will expect it to be."

== Track listing ==
=== Disc one ===
No.	Title	Writer(s)	Origin	Length
1.	"Rock! Rock! (Till You Drop)"	Steve Clark; Joe Elliott; Robert John "Mutt" Lange; Rick Savage	Pyromania, 1983	3:55
2.	"Rocket"	Clark; Phil Collen; Elliott; Lange; Savage	Hysteria, 1987	4:29
3.	"Animal"	Clark; Collen; Elliott; Lange; Savage	Hysteria	4:02
4.	"C'mon C'mon"	Savage	Songs from the Sparkle Lounge, 2008	4:00
5.	"Make Love Like a Man"	Clark; Collen; Elliott; Lange	Adrenalize, 1992	5:56
6.	"Too Late for Love"	Clark; Elliott; Lange; Savage; Pete Willis	Pyromania	5:17
7.	"Foolin'"	Clark; Elliott; Lange	Pyromania	5:06
8.	"Nine Lives"	Collen; Elliott; Tim McGraw; Savage	Songs from the Sparkle Lounge	3:35
9.	"Love Bites"	Clark; Collen; Elliott; Lange; Savage	Hysteria	7:28
10.	"Rock On"	David Essex	Yeah!, 2006	5:10

=== Disc two ===
No.	Title	Writer(s)	Origin	Length
1.	"Two Steps Behind"	Elliott	Retro Active and Last Action Hero, 1993	4:29
2.	"Bringin' On the Heartbreak"	Clark; Elliott; Willis	High 'n' Dry, 1981	5:08
3.	"Switch 625"	Clark	High 'n' Dry	4:14
4.	"Hysteria"	Clark; Collen; Elliott; Lange; Savage	Hysteria	6:20
5.	"Armageddon It"	Clark; Collen; Elliott; Lange; Savage	Hysteria	5:19
6.	"Photograph"	Clark; Elliott; Lange; Savage; Willis	Pyromania	4:35
7.	"Pour Some Sugar on Me"	Clark; Collen; Elliott; Lange; Savage	Hysteria	5:05
8.	"Rock of Ages"	Clark; Elliott; Lange	Pyromania	6:11
9.	"Let's Get Rocked"	Collen; Elliott; Lange; Savage	Adrenalize	6:11
10.	"Action"	Brian Connolly; Steve Priest; Andy Scott; Mick Tucker	Retro Active	4:01
11.	"Bad Actress"	Elliott	Songs from the Sparkle Lounge	3:31
12.	"Undefeated"	Elliott	new studio track	4:40
13.	"Kings of the World"	Savage	new studio track	6:12
14.	"It's All About Believin'"	Collen; C. J. Vanston	new studio track	4:22

Japanese bonus track
No.	Title	Writer(s)	Length
15.	"Kings of the World" (acoustic version)	Savage	4:22

=== DVD ===
Behind the scenes on the Sparkle Lounge Tour 2008–2009, including live performances of

- "Rock! Rock! (Till You Drop)"
- "Armageddon It"
- "Pour Some Sugar on Me"
- "Hysteria"

Music videos

- "C'mon C'mon"

== Charts ==
Chart (2011)	Peak position
Australian Albums (ARIA)	80
Canadian Albums (Billboard)	14
German Albums (Offizielle Top 100)	46
Swiss Albums (Schweizer Hitparade)	51
UK Albums (OCC)	44
UK Rock & Metal Albums (OCC)	3
US Billboard 200	16

Chart (2025)	Peak position
Portuguese Albums (AFP)	184

== Certifications ==
Region	Certification	Certified units/sales
United States (RIAA)	Gold	500,000^{‡}
^{‡} Sales+streaming figures based on certification alone.
