= Def Leppard World Tour 2015 =

2015 concert tour by Def Leppard

Def Leppard World Tour
- Tour by Def Leppard
- Associated album: Def Leppard
- Start date: 15 April 2015
- End date: 19 December 2015
- Legs: 5
- No. of shows: 102

Def Leppard concert chronology
- Heroes Tour (2014); Def Leppard World Tour (2015); Def Leppard & Journey 2018 Tour (2018)

The Def Leppard World Tour was a tour by English rock band Def Leppard in support of their self-titled album. The tour started with 13 dates in Canada through April and May. The end of May and beginning of June was spent playing 12 dates in Europe before Def Leppard returned to the United States for 48 dates with Styx and Tesla from June to October.

== History ==
Announcements of the first dates of the tour began in December 2014 when Def Leppard announced a 13 date tour of Canada in the April and May 2015. It will be the band's first tour of Canada since their 2008 Songs from the Sparkle Lounge Tour. The Canadian tour is to be followed by 12 dates and festivals in Europe from May to June. On February 12, 2015, Def Leppard announced 48 dates touring the US with Styx and Tesla. Joe Elliott and other members of the band have stated that the North American Tour would extend to a full world tour to follow through December 2015, with a cruise and second Las Vegas residency planned for early 2016. On March 27, 2015, Def Leppard announced the "Let's Get Rocked in the Still of the Night II" tour of the United Kingdom and Ireland with Whitesnake in December 2015.

== Setlist ==
Canadian leg setlist. Most of the songs performed are standards that the band performs on most or all of their tours, however there were two less commonly performed songs from the Euphoria album that were pulled out for this tour. The song "Promises" was included along with "Paper Sun", which was played for the first time since its initial airings during the Euphoria Tour in 2000.

1. "Let's Go" (after 7 October)
2. "Rock! Rock! (Till You Drop)" (dropped after 18 November)
3. "Animal"
4. "Dangerous" (added on 18 November)
5. "Let It Go" (added on the 4th show, in Dawson Creek, BC)
6. "Foolin'"
7. "Promises"
8. "Paper Sun"
9. "Love Bites"
10. "Armageddon It"
11. "Rock On"
12. "Two Steps Behind"
13. "Rocket"
14. "Bringin' On the Heartbreak"
15. "Switch 625"
16. "Hysteria"
17. "Let's Get Rocked"
18. "Pour Some Sugar on Me"

Encore

17. "Rock of Ages"
18. "Photograph"

== Tour dates ==
Date	City	Country	Venue
Canada
15 April 2015	Penticton	Canada	South Okanagan Events Center
17 April 2015	Victoria	Canada	Save on Foods Memorial Center
18 April 2015	Vancouver	Canada	Pepsi Live at Rogers Arena
20 April 2015	Dawson Creek	Canada	EnCana Events Centre
22 April 2015	Calgary	Canada	Scotiabank Saddledome
23 April 2015	Edmonton	Canada	Rexall Place
25 April 2015	Lethbridge	Canada	Enmax Centre
26 April 2015	Regina	Canada	Brandt Centre
28 April 2015	Saskatoon	Canada	SaskTel Centre
29 April 2015	Winnipeg	Canada	MTS Centre
2 May 2015	Montreal	Canada	Bell Centre
4 May 2015	Ottawa	Canada	TD Place Arena
5 May 2015	London	Canada	Budweiser Gardens
Europe
~~15 May 2015~~	~~Minsk~~	~~Belarus~~	~~Minsk Sports Palace~~
17 May 2015	Vilnius	Lithuania	Siemens Arena
19 May 2015	Warsaw	Poland	Torwar Hall
22 May 2015	Ostrava	Czech Republic	ČEZ Aréna
23 May 2015	Prague	Czech Republic	O2 Arena
25 May 2015	Stuttgart	Germany	Porsche-Arena
27 May 2015	Frankfurt	Germany	Stadthalle Offenbach
28 May 2015	Cologne	Germany	Palladium
30 May 2015	Esbjerg	Denmark	Esjberg Rock Festival
2 June 2015	Oslo	Norway	Oslo Spektrum
4 June 2015	Sölvesborg	Sweden	Sweden Rock Festival
6 June 2015	Tampere	Finland	Tampere South Park Festival
North America with Styx & Tesla
20 June 2015	San Juan	Puerto Rico	José Miguel Agrelot Coliseum
23 June 2015	Tampa	United States	MidFlorida Credit Union Amphitheatre
25 June 2015	West Palm Beach	United States	Coral Sky Amphitheater
27 June 2015	Birmingham	United States	Oak Mountain Amphitheatre
28 June 2015	Atlanta	United States	Aaron's Amphitheatre
30 June 2015	Charlotte	United States	PNC Music Pavilion
2 July 2015	Bristow	United States	Jiffy Lube Live
3 July 2015	Virginia Beach	United States	Farm Bureau Live
5 July 2015	Uncasville	United States	Mohegan Sun Arena
7 July 2015	Gilford	United States	Bank of New Hampshire Pavilion at Meadowbrook
9 July 2015	Mansfield	United States	Xfinity Center
11 July 2015	Bethel	United States	Bethel Woods Center for the Arts
12 July 2015	Darien	United States	Darien Lake Performing Arts Center
14 July 2015	Toronto	Canada	Molson Canadian Amphitheatre
15 July 2015	Youngstown	United States	Covelli Centre
17 July 2015	Clarkston	United States	DTE Energy Music Theatre
18 July 2015	Oshkosh	United States	Rock USA
21 July 2015	Mt. Pleasant	United States	Soaring Eagle Casino & Resort
23 July 2015	Wantagh	United States	Nikon at Jones Beach Theater
24 July 2015	Saratoga Springs	United States	Saratoga Performing Arts Center
25 July 2015	Holmdel	United States	PNC Bank Arts Center
27 July 2015	Paso Robles	United States	Midstate Fair
7 August 2015	Sturgis	United States	Buffalo Chip Campground
8 August 2015	Sioux Falls	United States	Sioux Falls Arena
10 August 2015	Oklahoma City	United States	Chesapeake Energy Arena
11 August 2015	Kansas City	United States	Starlight Theatre
14 August 2015	Sedalia	United States	Missouri State Fair
15 August 2015	Des Moines	United States	Iowa State Fair
17 August 2015	Cincinnati	United States	Riverbend Music Center
18 August 2015	Nashville	United States	Bridgestone Arena
21 August 2015	Dallas	United States	Gexa Energy Pavilion
22 August 2015	The Woodlands	United States	Cynthia Woods Mitchell Pavilion
23 August 2015	Austin	United States	Austin360 Amphitheater
27 August 2015	Saint Paul	United States	Minnesota State Fair
28 August 2015	Grand Forks	United States	Alerus Center
30 August 2015	Noblesville	United States	Klipsch Music Center
1 September 2015	Allentown	United States	Great Allentown Fair
3 September 2015	Louisville	United States	KFC Yum! Center
4 September 2015	Maryland Heights	United States	Hollywood Casino Amphitheatre
5 September 2015	Tinley Park	United States	First Midwest Bank Amphitheatre
16 September 2015	Auburn	United States	White River Amphitheatre
17 September 2015	Ridgefield	United States	Sleep Country Amphitheater
19 September 2015	Mountain View	United States	Shoreline Amphitheatre
20 September 2015	Inglewood	United States	The Forum
22 September 2015	Chula Vista	United States	Sleep Train Amphitheatre
23 September 2015	Phoenix	United States	Ak-Chin Pavilion
25 September 2015	Albuquerque	United States	Isleta Amphitheater
26 September 2015	Denver	United States	Pepsi Center
28 September 2015	West Valley City	United States	USANA Amphitheatre
30 September 2015	Spokane	United States	Spokane Arena
2 October 2015	Bozeman	United States	Brick Breeden Fieldhouse
4 October 2015	Bismarck	United States	Bismarck Civic Center
North America with Foreigner & Night Ranger / Tesla
5 October 2015	Saint Paul	United States	Xcel Energy Center
7 October 2015	Moline	United States	iWireless Center
9 October 2015	Tulsa	United States	BOK Center
10 October 2015	Wichita	United States	Intrust Bank Arena
11 October 2015	Lincoln	United States	Pinnacle Bank Arena
14 October 2015	Columbus	United States	The Schottenstein Center
16 October 2015	Columbia	United States	Colonial Life Arena
17 October 2015	Jacksonville	United States	Veterans Memorial Arena
Asia & Australia
9 November 2015	Tokyo	Japan	Nippon Budokan
10 November 2015	Osaka	Japan	Orix Theater
12 November 2015	Nagoya	Japan	Zepp
13 November 2015	Sendai	Japan	Sun Plaza Hall
17 November 2015	Sydney	Australia	Sydney Entertainment Centre
18 November 2015	Melbourne	Australia	Rod Laver Arena
21 November 2015	Perth	Australia	Red Hill Auditorium
24 November 2015	Singapore	Singapore	Suntec Singapore Convention & Exhibition Centre
U.K. & Ireland with Whitesnake
6 December 2015	Dublin	Ireland	3Arena
7 December 2015	Belfast	Northern Ireland	Odyssey Arena
8 December 2015	Newcastle upon Tyne	England	Metro Radio Arena
10 December 2015	Glasgow	Scotland	The SSE Hydro
12 December 2015	Birmingham	England	Genting Arena
13 December 2015	Nottingham	England	Capital FM Arena
15 December 2015	Manchester	England	Manchester Arena
16 December 2015	Cardiff	Wales	Motorpoint Arena Cardiff
18 December 2015	London	England	SSE Arena, Wembley
19 December 2015	Sheffield	England	Motorpoint Arena Sheffield

== Gross ==
The tour grossed US$54 million, with 992,099 tickets sold at 96 concerts.

== Personnel ==
Def Leppard

- Rick Savage – bass, backing vocals
- Joe Elliott – lead vocals
- Rick Allen – drums, percussion, backing vocals
- Phil Collen – guitar, backing vocals
- Vivian Campbell – guitar, backing vocals

Touring members

- Steve Brown – guitar, backing vocals (filled-in for Vivian Campbell on June 23, June 25 and June 27, 2015)
