= The World Tour (Def Leppard and Mötley Crüe) =

2023 concert tour by Def Leppard and Mötley Crüe

- Tour by Def Leppard and Mötley Crüe
- Location: Asia; Australia; Europe; North America; South America
- Start date: February 10, 2023
- End date: November 14, 2023
- Legs: 4 plus warmup
- No. of shows: 40

The World Tour was a co-headlining concert tour by English rock band Def Leppard and American rock band Mötley Crüe, which took place from February through November 2023 in venues across Latin America, Europe, North America, Asia and Oceania. During their previous tour, The Stadium Tour, the members of Def Leppard indicated that a European version of The Stadium Tour would take place in 2023. Tour dates were announced on October 20, 2022; this tour was advertised as The World Tour and confirmed to be a co-headlining tour of Def Leppard and Mötley Crüe. In addition to playing stadiums and entertainment venues, the tour also featured appearances at international music festivals. This was Mötley Crüe's first tour without co-founder and original guitarist Mick Mars, who announced his retirement in October 2022, with John 5 replacing him.

== Special guests ==
- Europe (Leg 2: Europe)
- Mammoth WVH (Leg 2: Europe)
- Alice Cooper (Leg 3: North America)

== Opening acts ==
- Whisky Blood (Leg 1: Latin America)
- Rata Blanca (Leg 1: Latin America)

== Set lists ==
Mötley Crüe

1. "Wild Side"
2. "Shout at the Devil"
3. "Too Fast for Love"
4. "Don't Go Away Mad (Just Go Away)"
5. "Saints of Los Angeles"
6. "Live Wire"
7. "Looks That Kill"
8. "The Dirt (Est. 1981)"
9. "Rock 'n' Roll (Part 2)" / "Smokin' in the Boys Room" / "Helter Skelter" / "Anarchy in the U.K." / "Blitzkrieg Bop"
10. "Home Sweet Home"
11. "Dr. Feelgood"
12. "Same Ol' Situation"
13. "Girls, Girls, Girls"
14. "Primal Scream"
15. "Kickstart My Heart"

Def Leppard

1. "Take What You Want"
2. "Let's Get Rocked"
3. "Animal"
4. "Foolin'"
5. "Armageddon It"
6. "Kick"
7. "Love Bites"
8. "Promises"
9. "This Guitar"
10. "When Love and Hate Collide"
11. "Rocket"
12. "Bringin' On the Heartbreak"
13. "Switch 625"
14. "Hysteria"
15. "Pour Some Sugar on Me"
16. "Rock of Ages"
17. "Photograph"

== Tour dates ==
List of concerts, showing date, city, country and venue
Date	City	Country	Venue
February 10, 2023	Atlantic City	United States	Hard Rock Live
February 11, 2023	Atlantic City	United States	Hard Rock Live
February 18, 2023	Mexico City	Mexico	Foro Sol
February 21, 2023	Monterrey	Mexico	Estadio Borregos
February 25, 2023	Bogotá	Colombia	Simón Bolívar Park
February 28, 2023	Lima	Peru	Estadio Universidad San Marcos
March 3, 2023	Santiago	Chile	Estadio Bicentenario de La Florida
March 7, 2023	São Paulo	Brazil	Allianz Parque
March 9, 2023	Buenos Aires	Argentina	Sarmiento Park
March 12, 2023	Hollywood	United States	Hard Rock Live
May 22, 2023	Sheffield	England	Bramall Lane
May 25, 2023	Mönchengladbach	Germany	SparkassenPark
May 27, 2023	Munich	Germany	Königsplatz
May 29, 2023	Budapest	Hungary	MVM Dome
May 31, 2023	Kraków	Poland	Tauron Arena
June 2, 2023 (Note: The June 2, 2023 concert in Prague was part of Prague Rocks.)	Prague	Czech Republic	Letňany
June 3, 2023	Hanover	Germany	Expo Park Hannover
June 7, 2023 (Note: The June 7, 2023 concert in Sölvesborg was part of the Sweden Rock Festival.)	Sölvesborg	Sweden	Norje Havsbad
June 9, 2023 (Note: The June 9, 2023 concert in Hyvinkää was part of Rock Fest.)	Hyvinkää	Finland	Hyvinkää Airfield
June 11, 2023 (Note: The June 11, 2023 concert in Trondheim was part of Trondheim Rocks.)	Trondheim	Norway	Bryggeribyen EC Dahls Arena
June 14, 2023 (Note: The June 14, 2023 concert in Copenhagen was part of Copenhell.)	Copenhagen	Denmark	Refshaleøen
June 16, 2023 (Note: The June 16, 2023 concert in Clisson was part of Hellfest.)	Clisson	France	Val de Moine
June 18, 2023 (Note: The June 18, 2023 concert in Dessel was part of Graspop Metal Meeting.)	Dessel	Belgium	Festivalpark de Boeretang
June 20, 2023	Milan	Italy	Ippodromo SNAI San Siro
June 23, 2023	Lisbon	Portugal	Passeio Marítimo de Algés
June 24, 2023	Rivas-Vaciamadrid	Spain	Auditorio Miguel Ríos
June 27, 2023	Thun	Switzerland	Stockhorn Arena
July 1, 2023	London	England	Wembley Stadium
July 2, 2023 (Note: The July 2, 2023 concert in Lytham St Annes was part of Lytham Festival.)	Lytham	England	Lytham Green
July 4, 2023	Dublin	Ireland	Marlay Park
July 6, 2023	Glasgow	Scotland	Glasgow Green
August 5, 2023	Syracuse	United States	JMA Wireless Dome
August 8, 2023	Columbus	United States	Ohio Stadium
August 11, 2023	Fargo	United States	Fargodome
August 13, 2023	Omaha	United States	Charles Schwab Field
August 16, 2023	Tulsa	United States	Skelly Field at H. A. Chapman Stadium
August 18, 2023	El Paso	United States	Sun Bowl
November 3, 2023	Yokohama	Japan	K-Arena Yokohama
November 4, 2023	Yokohama	Japan	K-Arena Yokohama
November 8, 2023	Brisbane	Australia	Suncorp Stadium
November 11, 2023	Sydney	Australia	Sydney Showground Stadium
November 14, 2023	Melbourne	Australia	Marvel Stadium

=== Cancelled tour dates ===
Date	City	Country	Venue	Reason
March 9, 2023	Curitiba	Brazil	Estádio Couto Pereira	Production and logistical reasons
March 11, 2023	Porto Alegre	Brazil	Arena do Grêmio	Production and logistical reasons

== Personnel ==
Def Leppard

- Rick Savage – bass, backing vocals
- Joe Elliott – lead vocals, occasional acoustic guitar
- Rick Allen – drums, percussion
- Phil Collen – guitar, backing vocals
- Vivian Campbell – guitar, backing vocals

Mötley Crüe

- Nikki Sixx – bass, backing vocals
- Vince Neil – lead vocals, occasional guitar
- Tommy Lee – drums, piano, backing vocals
- John 5 – guitar, backing vocals
