= The Stadium Tour =

2022 tour by Def Leppard and Mötley Crüe

- Tour by Def Leppard and Mötley Crüe
- Location: Canada; United States
- Associated album: Diamond Star Halos; The Dirt
- Start date: June 16, 2022
- End date: September 9, 2022
- No. of shows: 36

The Stadium Tour was a co-headlining concert tour by English rock band Def Leppard and American rock band Mötley Crüe, taking place in the summer and fall of 2022 in stadium sized venues venues across North America. Poison and Joan Jett & the Blackhearts served as the tour's special guests, while Classless Act was the opening band. It was Mötley Crüe's first major tour in seven years (following their final world tour in 2014–2015), and Def Leppard's first in three years, with the latter touring in support of their twelfth studio album Diamond Star Halos.

The Stadium Tour was announced on December 4, 2019, and was set to take place in the summer of 2020. It was later announced that the tour would be rescheduled for 2021 due to the COVID-19 pandemic. The tour was once again pushed back to 2022 due to the same circumstances. In early 2022, several new dates were announced, with the tour being expanded into Canada, with shows in Toronto, Vancouver, and Edmonton, alongside American dates in Indianapolis and Las Vegas. The tour began on June 16, 2022 in Atlanta and concluded on September 9, 2022 in Las Vegas. The members of Def Leppard indicated that a European version of The Stadium Tour would take place in 2023. Tour dates for the Latin American and European tour were later announced on October 20, 2022; this tour was advertised as The World Tour and was once again a co-headlining tour of Def Leppard and Mötley Crüe.

== Support acts ==
=== Special guests ===
- Poison
- Joan Jett & the Blackhearts

=== Opening act ===
- Classless Act

== Set lists ==
Mötley Crüe

1. "Wild Side"
2. "Shout at the Devil"
3. "Too Fast for Love"
4. "Don't Go Away Mad (Just Go Away)"
5. "Saints of Los Angeles"
6. "Live Wire"
7. "Looks That Kill"
8. "The Dirt (Est. 1981)"
9. "Rock and Roll, Part 2" / "Smokin' in the Boys Room" / "White Punks on Dope" / "Helter Skelter" / "Anarchy in the U.K."
10. "Home Sweet Home"
11. "Dr. Feelgood"
12. "Same Ol' Situation (S.O.S.)"
13. "Girls, Girls, Girls"
14. "Primal Scream"
15. "Kickstart My Heart"

Def Leppard

1. "Take What You Want"
2. "Fire It Up"
3. "Animal"
4. "Foolin'"
5. "Armageddon It"
6. "Kick"
7. "Love Bites"
8. "Excitable"
9. "This Guitar"
10. "Two Steps Behind"
11. "Rocket"
12. "Bringin' On the Heartbreak"
13. "Switch 625"
14. "Hysteria"
15. "Pour Some Sugar on Me"
16. "Rock of Ages"
17. "Photograph"

== Tour dates ==
List of concerts, showing date, city, country, venue, tickets sold, number of available tickets and amount of gross revenue
Date	City	Country	Venue	Attendance	Revenue
June 16, 2022	Atlanta	United States	Truist Park	38,008 / 38,008	$5,208,533
June 18, 2022	Miami Gardens	United States	Hard Rock Stadium	40,250 / 43,961	$3,452,959
June 19, 2022	Orlando	United States	Camping World Stadium	35,532 / 37,374	$4,815,804
June 22, 2022	Washington, D.C.	United States	Nationals Park	29,618 / 35,574	$3,692,386
June 24, 2022	New York City	United States	Citi Field	34,679 / 34,679	$5,127,894
June 25, 2022	Philadelphia	United States	Citizens Bank Park	38,076 / 38,076	$5,551,938
June 28, 2022	Charlotte	United States	Bank of America Stadium	41,896 / 41,896	$6,041,394
June 30, 2022 (Note: Poison was forced to cancel their appearance due to Bret Michaels' hospitalization.)	Nashville	United States	Nissan Stadium	42,115 / 42,115	$5,424,623
July 2, 2022	Jacksonville	United States	TIAA Bank Field	27,828 / 28,394	$2,988,306
July 5, 2022	St. Louis	United States	Busch Stadium	33,307 / 38,024	$4,213,041
July 8, 2022	Chicago	United States	Wrigley Field	37,696 / 37,696	$5,831,869
July 10, 2022	Detroit	United States	Comerica Park	35,097 / 35,097	$5,012,868
July 12, 2022	Hershey	United States	Hersheypark Stadium	29,591 / 29,591	$4,009,063
July 14, 2022	Cleveland	United States	FirstEnergy Stadium	34,815 / 34,815	$4,198,483
July 15, 2022	Cincinnati	United States	Great American Ball Park	34,867 / 34,867	$4,729,190
July 17, 2022	Milwaukee	United States	American Family Field	39,864 / 39,864	$5,175,001
July 19, 2022	Kansas City	United States	Kauffman Stadium	36,818 / 39,409	$4,291,251
July 21, 2022	Denver	United States	Coors Field	42,737 / 42,737	$6,181,056
August 5, 2022	Boston	United States	Fenway Park	64,066 / 66,000	$9,335,067
August 6, 2022	Boston	United States	Fenway Park	64,066 / 66,000	$9,335,067
August 8, 2022	Toronto	Canada	Rogers Centre	41,907 / 41,907	$4,372,928
August 10, 2022	Orchard Park	United States	Highmark Stadium	34,960 / 41,323	$3,390,778
August 12, 2022	Pittsburgh	United States	PNC Park	39,433 / 39,433	$5,432,484
August 14, 2022	Minneapolis	United States	U.S. Bank Stadium	42,212 / 42,212	$5,884,144
August 16, 2022	Indianapolis	United States	Lucas Oil Stadium	31,455 / 42,651	$3,433,185
August 19, 2022	Houston	United States	Minute Maid Park	39,247 / 39,247	$5,435,060
August 21, 2022	San Antonio	United States	Alamodome	45,069 / 45,069	$5,875,824
August 22, 2022	Arlington	United States	Globe Life Field	37,086 / 37,086	$5,561,368
August 25, 2022	Glendale	United States	State Farm Stadium	45,131 / 45,131	$6,379,829
August 27, 2022	Inglewood	United States	SoFi Stadium	43,210 / 43,210	$6,192,352
August 28, 2022	San Diego	United States	Petco Park	34,963 / 34,963	$4,765,707
August 31, 2022	Seattle	United States	T-Mobile Park	41,280 / 41,280	$5,957,982
September 2, 2022	Vancouver	Canada	BC Place	34,213 / 34,213	$3,574,727
September 4, 2022	Edmonton	Canada	Commonwealth Stadium	46,077 / 46,077	$4,845,322
September 7, 2022	San Francisco	United States	Oracle Park	30,087 / 32,212	$4,620,900
September 9, 2022	Las Vegas	United States	Allegiant Stadium	37,845 / 37,845	$5,539,489

== Personnel ==
Def Leppard

- Rick Savage – bass, backing vocals
- Joe Elliott – lead vocals, occasional acoustic guitar
- Rick Allen – drums, percussion
- Phil Collen – guitar, backing vocals
- Vivian Campbell – guitar, backing vocals

Mötley Crüe

- Nikki Sixx – bass, piano, backing vocals
- Vince Neil – lead vocals
- Tommy Lee – drums, piano, backing vocals
- Mick Mars – guitar, backing vocals

Additional personnel:
- Tommy Clufetos – drums (Note: From June 16 to 25, Clufetos served as Mötley Crüe's drummer while Tommy Lee recovered from a rib injury.)
- "Nasty Habits":
  - Laura "Lolo" D'Anzieri – backing vocals, dancer
  - Bailey Swift – backing vocals, dancer
  - Hannah Sutton – backing vocals, dancer
