= Kiss 40th Anniversary World Tour =

2014–2015 concert tour by Kiss

- Tour by Kiss and Def Leppard
- Associated album: Kiss 40
- Start date: June 23, 2014
- End date: October 16, 2015
- Legs: 5
- No. of shows: 93
Kiss tour chronology
Monster World Tour (2012–2013)	Kiss 40th Anniversary World Tour (2014–2015)	Freedom to Rock Tour (2016)
Def Leppard tour chronology
Summer Tour 2013 (2013)	Heroes Tour (2014)	Def Leppard World Tour (2015)

The Kiss 40th Anniversary World Tour was a concert tour by American rock band Kiss. Def Leppard joined Kiss for the first 42 shows of the tour. Kobra and the Lotus and The Dead Daisies were the opening acts.

In the tour program for Kiss' final tour, Simmons reflected on the tour:

With this lineup of Kiss, Eric Singer, Tommy Thayer, Paul Stanley and myself, we have played to the largest South American, European and Australian shows we have ever played at, literally stadiums full of fans showed up en masse. Everyone was there to celebrate Kiss today, here and now. The band are alive and well and I think we're playing better than we ever have. What we've got is four people who believe in the same thing, the notion that we're damn lucky to be up on that stage. Once you feel the same thing in your heart you feel like a team.

== Kiss set lists ==
=== North American set list ===
1. "Psycho Circus"
2. "Deuce"
3. "Shout It Out Loud"
4. "War Machine"
5. "Hotter Than Hell" (with fire breathing)
6. "I Love It Loud"
7. "Lick It Up"
8. "God of Thunder" (with bass solo, blood spitting and flying)
9. "Hide Your Heart"
10. "Calling Dr. Love"
11. "Love Gun" (Paul Stanley flies out to the B-Stage)
12. "Black Diamond"
13. "Detroit Rock City"
14. "Rock and Roll All Nite"

The setlist throughout the North American leg varied from show to show. Other songs played include: "King of the Night Time World", "Makin' Love", "Christine Sixteen", "Creatures of the Night", "Cold Gin", "Let Me Go, Rock 'n' Roll", "Plaster Caster", "Tears Are Falling", "Hell or Hallelujah", "I Was Made for Lovin' You", "Parasite", and "Do You Love Me?"

=== Japanese set list ===
1. "Detroit Rock City"
2. "Creatures of the Night"
3. "Psycho Circus"
4. "Parasite"
5. "Shout It Out Loud"
6. "War Machine" (with fire breathing)
7. "Do You Love Me?"
8. "Deuce"
9. "Hell or Hallelujah" (with guitar solo)
10. "I Love It Loud"
11. "Sukiyaki" (Kyu Sakamoto cover, a cappella)
12. "Lick It Up"
13. "God of Thunder" (with bass solo, blood spitting and flying)
14. "Love Gun" (Stanley flies out to the B-Stage)
15. "Black Diamond"

Encore

16. "I Was Made for Lovin' You"
17. "Samurai Son"
18. "Rock and Roll All Nite"
- "Hide Your Heart" only played in Nagoya
- "Yume no Ukiyo ni Saitemina" only played in Tokyo

=== South American set list ===
1. "Detroit Rock City"
2. "Creatures of the Night"
3. "Psycho Circus"
4. "I Love It Loud"
5. "War Machine" (with fire breathing)
6. "Do You Love Me?"
7. "Deuce"
8. "Hell or Hallelujah" (with guitar solo)
9. "Calling Dr. Love"
10. "Lick It Up"
11. "God of Thunder" (with bass solo, blood spitting and flying)
12. "Hide Your Heart"
13. "Love Gun" (Stanley flies out to the B-Stage)
14. "Black Diamond"

Encore

15. "Shout It Out Loud"
16. "I Was Made for Lovin' You"
17. "Rock and Roll All Nite"

=== European set list ===
1. "Detroit Rock City"
2. "Deuce"
3. "Psycho Circus"
4. "Creatures of the Night"
5. "I Love It Loud"
6. "War Machine" (with fire breathing)
7. "Do You Love Me?"
8. "Hell or Hallelujah" (with guitar solo)
9. "Calling Dr. Love"
10. "Lick It Up"
11. "God of Thunder" (with bass solo, blood spitting and flying)
12. "Parasite"
13. "Love Gun" (Stanley flies out to the B-Stage)
14. "Black Diamond"

Encore

15. "Shout It Out Loud"
16. "I Was Made for Lovin' You"
17. "Rock and Roll All Nite"
- "Cold Gin" replaced "Parasite" after the Rock in Vienna show.

=== Oceanian set list ===
1. "Detroit Rock City"
2. "Deuce"
3. "Psycho Circus"
4. "Creatures of the Night"
5. "I Love It Loud"
6. "War Machine" (with fire breathing)
7. "Do You Love Me?"
8. "Hell or Hallelujah" (with guitar solo)
9. "Calling Dr. Love"
10. "Lick It Up"
11. "God of Thunder" (with bass solo, blood spitting and flying)
12. "Cold Gin"
13. "Love Gun" (Stanley flies out to the B-Stage)
14. "Black Diamond"

Encore

15. "Shandi" (performed by Stanley)
16. "Shout It Out Loud"
17. "I Was Made for Lovin' You"
18. "Rock and Roll All Nite"

== Def Leppard set list ==
1. "Let It Go"
2. "Rocket"
3. "Animal"
4. "Foolin'"
5. "Love Bites"
6. "Let's Get Rocked"
7. "Two Steps Behind" (Acoustic)
8. "Bringin' On the Heartbreak" (Acoustic/Electric)
9. "Switch 625"
10. "Hysteria"
11. "Armageddon It"
12. "Pour Some Sugar on Me"

Encore

1. "Rock of Ages"
2. "Photograph"
- "Rocket" was played after Hysteria starting with the 11th show which was held in Austin TX
- "Rocket" not played in Los Angeles and Phoenix

== Tour dates ==
List of 2014 concerts
Date	City	Country	Venue
June 23, 2014 (Note: Co-headlining tour with Def Leppard.)	West Valley City	United States	USANA Amphitheatre
June 25, 2014	Denver	United States	Pepsi Center
June 27, 2014	Ridgefield	United States	Sleep Country Amphitheater
June 29, 2014	Auburn	United States	White River Amphitheatre
July 2, 2014	Concord	United States	Concord Pavilion
July 3, 2014	Wheatland	United States	Sleep Train Amphitheatre
July 5, 2014	Irvine	United States	Verizon Wireless Amphitheatre
July 6, 2014	Chula Vista	United States	Sleep Train Amphitheatre
July 8, 2014	Inglewood	United States	The Forum
July 9, 2014	Phoenix	United States	Ak-Chin Pavilion
July 12, 2014	Austin	United States	Austin360 Amphitheater
July 13, 2014	Dallas	United States	Gexa Energy Pavilion
July 15, 2014	Cincinnati	United States	Riverbend Music Center
July 16, 2014	Nashville	United States	Bridgestone Arena
July 18, 2014	Atlanta	United States	Aaron's Amphitheatre
July 19, 2014	Charlotte	United States	PNC Music Pavilion
July 20, 2014	Raleigh	United States	Walnut Creek Amphitheatre
July 22, 2014	West Palm Beach	United States	Cruzan Amphitheatre
July 23, 2014	Tampa	United States	MidFlorida Credit Union Amphitheatre
July 25, 2014	Bristow	United States	Jiffy Lube Live
July 26, 2014	Holmdel	United States	PNC Bank Arts Center
August 1, 2014	Mansfield	United States	Xfinity Center
August 2, 2014	Atlantic City	United States	Boardwalk Hall
August 3, 2014	Camden	United States	Susquehanna Bank Center
August 5, 2014	Saratoga Springs	United States	Saratoga Performing Arts Center
August 6, 2014	Wantagh	United States	Nikon at Jones Beach Theater
August 8, 2014	Virginia Beach	United States	Farm Bureau Live
August 9, 2014	Scranton	United States	Toyota Pavilion
August 10, 2014	Hartford	United States	Xfinity Theatre
August 12, 2014	Toronto	Canada	Molson Canadian Amphitheatre
August 13, 2014	Darien	United States	Darien Lake Performing Arts Center
August 15, 2014	East Troy	United States	Alpine Valley Music Theatre
August 16, 2014	Tinley Park	United States	First Midwest Bank Amphitheatre
August 17, 2014	Minneapolis	United States	Target Center
August 20, 2014	Des Moines	United States	Wells Fargo Arena
August 22, 2014	Noblesville	United States	Klipsch Music Center
August 23, 2014	Clarkston	United States	DTE Energy Music Theatre
August 24, 2014	Burgettstown	United States	First Niagara Pavilion
August 26, 2014	Cuyaghoga Falls	United States	Blossom Music Center
August 28, 2014	Maryland Heights	United States	Verizon Wireless Amphitheatre
August 29, 2014	Tulsa	United States	BOK Center
August 31, 2014	The Woodlands	United States	Cynthia Woods Mitchell Pavilion
October 25, 2014 (Note: The concert on October 25, 2014 was a part of Hell and Heaven Festival.)	Mexico City	Mexico	Autódromo Hermanos Rodríguez
October 29, 2014	Anaheim	United States	Honda Center
November 5, 2014	Las Vegas	United States	The Joint
November 7, 2014	Las Vegas	United States	The Joint
November 8, 2014	Las Vegas	United States	The Joint
November 12, 2014	Las Vegas	United States	The Joint
November 14, 2014	Las Vegas	United States	The Joint
November 15, 2014	Las Vegas	United States	The Joint
November 19, 2014	Las Vegas	United States	The Joint
November 22, 2014	Las Vegas	United States	The Joint
November 23, 2014	Las Vegas	United States	The Joint

List of 2015 concerts
Date	City	Country	Venue
February 23, 2015	Nagoya	Japan	Nippon Gaishi Hall
February 25, 2015	Osaka	Japan	Osaka-jō Hall
February 26, 2015	Hiroshima	Japan	Hiroshima Sun Plaza
February 28, 2015	Sendai	Japan	Sekisui Heim Super Arena
March 3, 2015	Tokyo	Japan	Tokyo Dome
April 10, 2015	Bogotá	Colombia	Estadio El Campín
April 12, 2015	Quito	Ecuador	Bicentenário Park
April 14, 2015	Santiago	Chile	Movistar Arena
April 16, 2015	Buenos Aires	Argentina	José Amalfitani Stadium
April 18, 2015	Montevideo	Uruguay	Estadio Gran Parque Central
April 20, 2015	Florianópolis	Brazil	Devassa On Stage
April 21, 2015	Curitiba	Brazil	Pedreira Paulo Leminski
April 23, 2015	Belo Horizonte	Brazil	Mineirinho
April 24, 2015	Brasília	Brazil	Estadio Nacional de Brasilia Mané Garrincha
April 26, 2015	São Paulo	Brazil	Anhembi Convention Center
May 30, 2015 (Note: The concert on May 30, 2015 was a part of Rockavaria.)	Munich	Germany	Olympiastadion
May 31, 2015 (Note: The concert on May 31, 2015 was a part of Rock im Revier.)	Gelsenkirchen	Germany	Veltins-Arena
June 2, 2015	Hamburg	Germany	O2 World Arena
June 3, 2015	Berlin	Germany	O2 World Arena
June 4, 2015	Leipzig	Germany	Leipzig Arena
June 6, 2015 (Note: The concert on June 6, 2015 was a part of Rock in Vienna.)	Vienna	Austria	Donauinsel
June 8, 2015	Prague	Czech Republic	O2 Arena
June 10, 2015	Zürich	Switzerland	Hallenstadion
June 11, 2015	Verona	Italy	Verona Arena
June 14, 2015 (Note: The concert on June 14, 2015 was a part of Download Festival.)	Leicestershire	England	Donington Park
June 16, 2015	Paris	France	Zénith de Paris
June 18, 2015	Amsterdam	Netherlands	Ziggo Dome
June 19, 2015 (Note: The concert on June 19, 2015 was a part of Graspop Metal Meeting.)	Dessel	Belgium	Festivalpark Stenehei
June 21, 2015	Barcelona	Spain	Palau Sant Jordi
June 22, 2015	Madrid	Spain	Barclaycard Center
October 3, 2015	Perth	Australia	Perth Arena
October 6, 2015	Adelaide	Australia	Adelaide Entertainment Centre
October 8, 2015	Melbourne	Australia	Rod Laver Arena
October 9, 2015	Melbourne	Australia	Rod Laver Arena
October 10, 2015	Sydney	Australia	Allphones Arena
October 12, 2015	Newcastle	Australia	Newcastle Entertainment Centre
October 13, 2015	Brisbane	Australia	Brisbane Entertainment Centre
October 16, 2015	Auckland	New Zealand	Vector Arena

== Boxscore ==
Venue	City	Attendance	Gross revenue (USD)
Bridgestone Arena	Nashville	11,772 / 12,601 (93%)	$1,074,570
Boardwalk Hall	Atlantic City	9,144 / 10,616 (86%)	$719,121
Target Center	Minneapolis	12,274 / 12,274 (100%)	$1,197,761
DTE Energy Music Theater	Detroit	14,302 / 14,302 (100%)	$924,368
BOK Center	Tulsa	10,400 / 10,400 (100%)	$884,555
Estadio El Campín	Bogotá	11,875 / 20,000 (59%)	$1,508,965
Bicentenario Park	Quito	9,266 / 20,000 (46%)	$1,022,934
Movistar Arena	Santiago	12,516 / 13,000 (96%)	$1,059,000
José Amalfitani Stadium	Buenos Aires	35,000 / 43,000 (81%)	$2,200,000
Devassa On Stage	Florianópolis	5,318 / 9,000 (59%)	$405,225
Pedreira Paulo Leminski	Curitiba	14,980 / 17,700 (84%)	$1,073,040
Mineirinho	Belo Horizonte	6,566 / 15,000 (43%)	$398,910
Estacionamento do Estadio Nacional	Brasília	9,086 / 18,000 (50%)	$604,890
Anhembi Convention Center	São Paulo	72,337 / 76,428 (94%)	$6,365,540
Barclaycard Arena	Hamburg	9,589 / 11,797 (81%)	$620,820
Rod Laver Arena	Melbourne	18,182 / 20,236 (90%)	$1,694,950
Newcastle Entertainment Centre	Newcastle	4,708 / 5,522 (85%)	$427,241
Total		232,315 / 286,876 (81%)	$22,281,250

== Personnel ==
=== Kiss ===
- Paul Stanley – vocals, rhythm guitar
- Gene Simmons – vocals, bass
- Eric Singer – drums, vocals
- Tommy Thayer – lead guitar, vocals

Staff

- Francis Stueber – introduction voice

=== Def Leppard ===
- Joe Elliott – lead vocals, acoustic guitar, introduction voice (July 26)
- Phil Collen – lead & rhythm guitars, backing vocals
- Vivian Campbell – lead & rhythm guitars, backing vocals
- Rick Savage – bass, keyboards, backing vocals
- Rick Allen – drums, percussion
