= Viva! Hysteria =

2013 live album by Def Leppard

Live album by Def Leppard
- Released: 22 October 2013
- Recorded: 29–30 March 2013
- Venues: The Joint, Las Vegas
- Genres: Heavy metal, hard rock, glam metal
- Length: 142:42
- Label: Bludgeon Riffola/Frontiers
- Producer: Ronan McHugh

Def Leppard chronology
| Mirror Ball – Live & More (2011) | Viva! Hysteria (2013) | Def Leppard (2015) |

Singles from Viva! Hysteria
- 1. "Love and Affection" Released: October 2013

Viva! Hysteria

Video by Def Leppard
- Released: 22 October 2013
- Recorded: 29–30 March 2013
- Venues: The Joint, Las Vegas
- Label: Bludgeon Riffola/Frontiers
- Director: Christian Lamb
- Producers: Domenic J. Cotter, John Rubey

Def Leppard video chronology
| Rock of Ages: The DVD Collection (2005) | Viva! Hysteria (2013) | And There Will Be a Next Time... Live from Detroit (2017) |

Professional ratings
Review scores
| Source | Rating |
|---|---|
| MetalTraveller | 5/5 stars |
| JukeboxMetal | 2/5 stars |

Viva! Hysteria is a double live album by the English rock band Def Leppard released on the 22 October 2013. The album was recorded on 29 and 30 March 2013 during the band's residency of the same name at the Hard Rock Hotel and Casino (Las Vegas).

== Content ==
The first disc, taken from the band's 30 March performance, contains all 12 tracks from Def Leppard's 1987 album Hysteria, followed by an encore of two hits from their 1983 album Pyromania, which were "Rock of Ages" and "Photograph." The second disc has a selection of deeper cuts, many of which the band had not played in many years or even decades prior to the residency. The band performed the songs on the second disc under the alias Ded Flatbird as the "opening act" for the show, before playing all the songs on the Hysteria album as Def Leppard later in the night.

Tracks 1–8 on the second disc are eight of the nine songs played from the Ded Flatbird opening set on 29 March (excluding the fifth track played that night, "When Love & Hate Collide"). Tracks 9–15 on the second disc are the opening set from the following night, 30 March. This notably ends with the band playing all of side one of the band's 1981 album High 'n' Dry. Both Ded Flatbird sets open with the band playing a short excerpt of The Who's "Won't Get Fooled Again".

== Track listing ==
All tracks are written by Steve Clark, Phil Collen, Joe Elliott, Robert John "Mutt" Lange, and Rick Savage except where noted.

Disc one (as Def Leppard)
| No. | Title | Writer(s) | Origin | Length |
|---|---|---|---|---|
| 1. | "Women" | | Hysteria, 1987 | 6:11 |
| 2. | "Rocket" | | Hysteria | 6:09 |
| 3. | "Animal" | | Hysteria | 4:07 |
| 4. | "Love Bites" | | Hysteria | 6:08 |
| 5. | "Pour Some Sugar on Me" | | Hysteria | 4:32 |
| 6. | "Armageddon It" | | Hysteria | 5:26 |
| 7. | "Gods of War" | | Hysteria | 7:14 |
| 8. | "Don't Shoot Shotgun" | | Hysteria | 4:33 |
| 9. | "Run Riot" | | Hysteria | 4:49 |
| 10. | "Hysteria" | | Hysteria | 5:59 |
| 11. | "Excitable" | | Hysteria | 4:37 |
| 12. | "Love and Affection" | | Hysteria | 6:17 |
| 13. | "Rock of Ages" | Clark; Elliott; Lange | Pyromania, 1983 | 4:15 |
| 14. | "Photograph" | Clark; Elliott; Lange; Savage; Pete Willis | Pyromania | 6:13 |

Disc two (as Ded Flatbird)
| No. | Title | Writer(s) | Origin | Length |
|---|---|---|---|---|
| 1. | "Good Morning Freedom" | Clark; Elliott; Savage; Willis | "Hello America" B-side, 1980 | 3:36 |
| 2. | "Wasted" | Clark; Elliott | On Through the Night, 1980 | 3:44 |
| 3. | "Stagefright" | Elliott; Lange; Savage | Pyromania | 3:41 |
| 4. | "Mirror, Mirror (Look into My Eyes)" | Clark; Elliott | High 'n' Dry, 1981 | 4:56 |
| 5. | "Action" | Brian Connolly; Steve Priest; Andy Scott; Mick Tucker | Retro Active, 1993 | 4:13 |
| 6. | "Rock Brigade" | Clark; Elliott; Savage | On Through the Night | 3:41 |
| 7. | "Undefeated" | Elliott | Mirror Ball – Live & More, 2011 | 5:25 |
| 8. | "Promises" | Collen; Lange | Euphoria, 1999 | 4:11 |
| 9. | "On Through the Night" | Clark; Elliott; Savage | High 'n' Dry | 5:11 |
| 10. | "Slang" | Collen; Elliott | Slang, 1996 | 2:37 |
| 11. | "Let It Go" | Clark; Elliott; Willis | High 'n' Dry | 6:08 |
| 12. | "Another Hit and Run" | Elliott; Savage | High 'n' Dry | 5:14 |
| 13. | "High 'n' Dry (Saturday Night)" | Clark; Elliott; Savage | High 'n' Dry | 3:44 |
| 14. | "Bringin' On the Heartbreak" | Clark; Elliott; Willis | High 'n' Dry | 4:43 |
| 15. | "Switch 625" | Clark | High 'n' Dry | 5:08 |

Japanese edition bonus track
| No. | Title | Writer(s) | Origin | Length |
|---|---|---|---|---|
| 1. | "Acoustic Medley" ("Where Does Love Go When It Dies" / "Now" / "When Love & Hate Collide" / "Have You Ever Needed Someone So Bad" / "Two Steps Behind") | Rick Allen; Vivian Campbell; Collen; Elliott; Marti Frederiksen; Lange; Savage | Non-album single, 2012 | 7:41 |

=== DVD / Blu-ray ===
The DVD and Blu-ray releases, which also had a short stint in selected theaters around the world, contain the same track listing as the CD version, on one disc. The main difference is that the tracks on CD disc one comprise the main feature, and the songs on CD disc two are bonus features along with the Acoustic Medley.

== Personnel ==
- Joe Elliott – lead vocals - Also performed as his Ded Flatbird alias "Booty Reuben"
- Rick Savage – bass, backing vocals - Also performed as his Ded Flatbird alias "Fleetwood Beck"
- Phil Collen – guitar, backing vocals - Also performed as his Ded Flatbird alias "Chingy Chapman"
- Vivian Campbell – guitar, backing vocals - Also performed as his Ded Flatbird alias "Linkin Twain"
- Rick Allen – drums - Also performed as his Ded Flatbird alias "Camp Out"

== Charts ==
| Chart (2013) | Peak position |
|---|---|
| German Albums (Offizielle Top 100) | 28 |
| Swiss Albums (Schweizer Hitparade) | 83 |
| UK Albums (Official Charts) | 73 |
| UK Rock & Metal Albums (Official Charts) | 6 |
| US Billboard 200 | 24 |
