= Hysteria (Def Leppard album) =

Studio album by Def Leppard
- Released: 3 August 1987
- Recorded: February 1984 – January 1987
- Studios: Wisseloord (Hilversum); Windmill Lane (Dublin); Studio Des Dames (Paris)
- Genres: Glam metal; arena rock; hard rock; pop rock
- Length: 62:32
- Labels: Bludgeon Riffola; Mercury
- Producer: Robert John "Mutt" Lange

Def Leppard chronology
Pyromania (1983)	Hysteria (1987)	Adrenalize (1992)

Singles from Hysteria
- 1. "Animal" Released: July 1987; 2. "Women" Released: August 1987; 3. "Pour Some Sugar on Me" Released: September 1987; 4. "Hysteria" Released: November 1987; 5. "Armageddon It" Released: March 1988; 6. "Love Bites" Released: July 1988; 7. "Rocket" Released: January 1989

Audio
- "Album" playlist on YouTube

Hysteria is the fourth studio album by English rock band Def Leppard, released on 3 August 1987, by Mercury Records. The album is the follow-up to the band's 1983 breakthrough, Pyromania. Hysteria's creation took over three years and was plagued by delays, including the aftermath of the car accident on 31 December 1984 that cost drummer Rick Allen his left arm. Subsequent to the album's release, Def Leppard published a book titled Animal Instinct: The Def Leppard Story, written by Rolling Stone magazine senior editor David Fricke, on the three-year recording process of Hysteria and the difficult times the band endured through the mid-1980s. Lasting 62 minutes and 32 seconds, it is the band's longest studio album to date.

Hysteria was the band's third and final album to be produced by Robert John "Mutt" Lange. Accordingly to Joe Elliott, many names for the album were floated around including a joke title "Trouble Up Mill." Other titles that were considered were 'Paranoia' and 'Animal Instincts'. The final title of the album Hysteria was conceived by Allen referring to his car crash, the amputation of his arm, and the ensuing worldwide media coverage surrounding it. It is the last album to feature guitarist Steve Clark before his death in 1991, although songs co-written by him would appear on the band's next album, Adrenalize (1992).

Although initial sales stalled outside the band's devoted fanbase, it soon became a worldwide commercial success, reaching number one on both the Billboard 200 and the UK Albums Chart. It is Def Leppard's best-selling album to date, selling over 20 million copies worldwide, including 12 million in the US alone, and spawned seven hit singles, making it one of the best-selling albums of all time.

== Background and recording ==
Soon after completing the Pyromania tour in February 1984, the band commenced writing and pre-production for what became Hysteria in Dublin, using Fostex 4-track cassette recorders to capture ideas. Early sketches of "Animal", "Gods Of War" and "Armageddon It" were developed during this period. Lange joined them to help with writing and arrangements, but at late notice informed the group he could not commit to producing the album due to burnout from a gruelling schedule from the past few years. Thus, they had to find another producer who was available and they went with Jim Steinman.

Sessions with Steinman began at Wisseloord Studios, Holland on 11 August 1984, with Neil Dorfsman as engineer. However, it became clear that Steinman was not the right producer for them, that his standards were not as high as Lange's: Steinman's intention to make a raw-sounding record that captured the moment conflicted with the band's interest in creating a bigger, more pristine pop production. As singer Joe Elliott observed, "[Steinman] wouldn't adapt and we wouldn't compromise", and by October 1984 Steinman was ousted from the project. Dorfsman could not see the album through as he had commitments to work with Dire Straits on what became Brothers in Arms – he would later mention that they "barely [had] drums and bass on seven songs" after three months of work. In a 2026 interview Elliott confirms that they worked with Steinman for eight weeks and recorded seven songs that he still has a "box of tapes marked Hysteria: The Steinman Sessions" in his library. The songs worked on with Steinman were: "Don't Shoot Shotgun", "Run Riot", "Animal", "Women", "Gods of War", "Love and Affection" and a version of "Love Bites" that later was rewritten and released as the b-side "I Wanna Be Your Hero".

After parting ways with Steinman and scrapping the material from those sessions, the band tried to produce the album themselves with Lange's engineer Nigel Green. However, as Steve Clark recalled, "it was very slow work because we didn't have any sort of headmaster there, and we had to try everything five different ways."

On 31 December 1984, Rick Allen lost his left arm when his Corvette flipped off a country road. Following the accident, the band stood by Allen's decision to return to the drum kit despite his disability, using a combination electronic/acoustic kit with a set of electronic pedals that triggered (via MIDI) the sounds that he would have played with his left arm. The band slowly continued production until Lange returned in the summer of 1985 for vocal sessions in Paris. However, Lange soon felt that the material recorded so far (which sounded close to Pyromania) needed work, leading to another 18 months in the studio in total. After six weeks in Paris, the remainder of the record was completed between Dublin and Holland, primarily in a cheap jingle studio at Windmill Lane in Dublin. However, the sessions were further delayed by Lange's own auto accident (sustaining leg injuries from which he quickly recovered) and a bout of the mumps suffered by singer Joe Elliott in late 1986. Def Leppard also took a break from recording in August 1986 to play a few warm-up shows in Ireland (with Status Quo drummer Jeff Rich as second drummer) and then the Monsters of Rock festivals in Donington, Stockholm, Nuremberg and Mannheim. The shows were the first time Def Leppard played live since February 7, 1984 in Bangkok, marked Rick Allen's first live performances after the accident and saw the live premieres of the first two Hysteria tracks to be performed live in "Run Riot" and "Love and Affection".

Hysteria was recorded in a piecemeal way like the previous two albums, with individual parts (or notes, even) being recorded and overdubbed separately. The guitars were recorded first to a LinnDrum click track, which gave Lange and the band the flexibility to re-write and re-record parts of the song as they went along. Then, once the arrangements were finalised, the bass and drums were added towards the end of the recording.

The final recording sessions took place in late January 1987 for the song "Armageddon It" and a last-minute composition "Pour Some Sugar on Me", though Lange spent another three months mixing the tracks. The mixing took place at Lange's private studio in Hindhead, Surrey with engineers Nigel Green and Mike Shipley. In the meantime, the band completed additional recordings in February for B-side material, including "Tear It Down", "I Wanna Be Your Hero", "Ring of Fire" amongst others. The album was finally released worldwide on 3 August 1987, with "Animal" as the lead single in most countries except for the US and Canada where "Women" was the first single.

== Concept ==
The album's goal, set out by Lange, was to be a hard rock version of Michael Jackson's Thriller, in that every track was a potential hit single. Songs were therefore written with this concept in mind, disappointing heavy metal fans who clamoured for a straight sequel to the band's previous album, Pyromania. One song, "Love Bites", was already mostly written in the vein of a country ballad by Mutt Lange when he brought it to the band's attention.

While Pyromania contained traces of Def Leppard's original traditional heavy metal sound found on their first two albums, Hysteria removed them in favour of the latest sonic technology available at the time (best displayed on "Rocket", "Love Bites", "Excitable", and "Gods of War"). As with Pyromania, every song was recorded by every member in the studio separately instead of the whole band. The multiple vocal harmonies were enhanced by Lange's techniques, even pitching background vocals on all tracks. Guitar parts were now more focused on emphasising melody rather than hard rock riffing.

The band used a custom-modified version of the Rockman headphone amplifier, developed by guitarist Tom Scholz from the rock band Boston, to record the album. Engineer Mike Shipley described the Rockman as "a shitty little box" with "a godawful sound" that "had no real balls to it", but it was used because the other amplifiers used had an excessively "crunchy" sound ill-suited to layering guitars and which Lange did not think was "commercial" enough.

In addition, all of the album's drum sounds were samples recorded by Lange and the engineers, then programmed and sequenced on the Fairlight CMI. In a 1999 interview with Mix magazine, Shipley noted, "Pyromania was done the same way, on cheesy 8-bit Fairlight technology where we had to figure out how to record everything at half speed into the Fairlight to make it sound like it had some tone to it, and we'd be stacking up a bunch of snares and bass drums." Shipley also noted that the drum sounds were dealt with last because each song's structure could change so radically. This unique approach sometimes led to painstaking lengths of time in the recording studio.

The smash single, "Pour Some Sugar on Me", was the last song written but was quickly finished within two weeks. In sharp contrast, the final version of "Animal" took almost a full three years to be developed but was not as successful as other singles, only reaching number 19 on the Billboard Hot 100. However, the reverse was in the UK. "Animal" peaked at number 6 in the domestically, becoming their first bonefide hit in their own country, whilst "Pour Some Sugar On Me" at number 18 respectively.

In total the album saw seven singles, with six of them being hits in the UK and USA, including their only US number 1 "Love Bites."

== Critical reception ==
Professional ratings
Review scores
Source	Rating
AllMusic	5/5 stars
Classic Rock	4.5/5 stars
Encyclopedia of Popular Music	5/5 stars
The Great Rock Discography	7/10
The Guardian	4/5 stars
Pitchfork	8.7/10
Record Mirror	5/5
Rolling Stone	4/5 stars
The Rolling Stone Album Guide	5/5 stars
Sputnikmusic	5/5

Hysteria received generally positive reviews. AllMusic's Steve Huey awarded it five stars, stating, "Pyromania's slick, layered Mutt Lange production turned into a painstaking obsession with dense sonic detail on Hysteria, with the result that some critics dismissed the record as a stiff, mechanized pop sell-out (perhaps due in part to Rick Allen's new, partially electronic drum kit)." Huey characterized the album as "pop metal" rather than heavy metal, with reference to the production of Mutt Lange, and called it "arguably the best pop-metal album ever recorded".

In 2005, Hysteria was ranked number 464 in Rock Hard magazine's book The 500 Greatest Rock & Metal Albums of All Time. Hysteria got the same placement on Rolling Stone's list of the 500 best albums of all time, the magazine also ranked the album atop its list of the 50 greatest hair metal albums, and they placed the album on their list of "50 Rock Albums Every Country Fan Should Own". Loudwire placed the album at number two on their list of the top 30 hair metal albums. Hysteria was also included in the book 1001 Albums You Must Hear Before You Die. L.A. Weekly and Consequence of Sound both ranked the album number eight on their Hair Metal album lists. Metal Rules put the album on their list of the Top 50 Glam Metal Albums, at number 30. The Ringer called Hysteria "the greatest hair-metal album ever made". In 2018, Collin Brennan of Consequence included the album in his list of "10 Hair Metal Albums That Don’t Suck".

"I can say objectively – because I wasn't in the band then – that Hysteria is one of the greatest records of all time," remarked Leppard guitarist Vivian Campbell.

== Commercial performance ==
David Simone, managing director of Phonogram Records at the time, said the album might have been the most expensive record made in the UK. According to guitarist Phil Collen, the album had to sell a minimum of 5 million copies to break even.

The popularity of Def Leppard in their homeland had grown significantly over the previous four years, and Hysteria topped the charts in Britain in its first week of release. The album was also a major success in other parts of Europe. In the US, however, the band initially struggled to regain the momentum of Pyromania that was lost from such a prolonged absence. The leadoff track, "Women", was selected as the first single for the US and Canada, instead of "Animal", in July 1987. Then-manager Cliff Burnstein reasoned that the band needed to reconnect with their hard rock audience first before issuing more top 40-friendly singles. "Women" became a top ten hit on the rock chart, peaking at number seven, but as predicted, did not make a large impact on the Billboard Hot 100, peaking at number 80.

The success of the album's fourth single, "Pour Some Sugar on Me" would propel the album to the top of the US Billboard 200 albums chart on 23 July 1988, nearly a year after its release – topping the chart three separate times for a combined total of six weeks. Seven singles were eventually released in the United States, with "Love Bites" reaching number one, and three others reaching the top ten. The singles earned similar success in the United Kingdom. In the Billboard issue dated 8 October 1988, Def Leppard held the number one spot on both the singles and album charts with "Love Bites" and Hysteria, respectively.

Hysteria went on to dominate album charts around the world for three years. It was certified 12× platinum by the RIAA in 1998. The album currently sits as the 51st best selling album of all time in the US. It spent 96 weeks in the US top 40, a record for the 1980s it ties with Born in the U.S.A. The album has sold more than 20 million copies worldwide.

Speaking to Kerrang! in May 2008 about the album's success, Joe Elliott remembered:

For us the first album showed promise, the second showed the true reality of where we were going, the third album worked better in America than it did in England simply because there was no exposure radio-wise over here but by the time we did Hysteria, everything had fallen into place. Airplay and hit singles were one aspect of it but there was also all the hard work we put into the album – we literally did slave over it to get every sound on it right. There was also Rick's accident, of course, and to be honest, I'm sure there was the initial wave of sympathy but I'm equally sure the album would have still worked anyway. None of the other stuff – the touring, the promotion, the videos – none of that would have meant anything if the songs hadn't been there and I'm still really proud of all the songs on Hysteria.

On 24 October 2006, a 2-CD "deluxe edition" of the album was released, including a remastering of the original b-sides and bonus tracks from the album's period. These songs include "Tear It Down", "I Wanna Be Your Hero", "Ride Into The Sun" (originally released in 1979 on The Def Leppard E.P.) and "Ring of Fire". Many of these songs, alongside two other Hysteria compositions "Desert Song" and "Fractured Love", had been featured on Retro Active, albeit with remixes, revamps, and new parts added. The deluxe edition Hysteria CD included the original b-side versions of these recordings without alterations.

Another song, "Tonight" was originally recorded on 5 May 1988 during a break in the Hysteria World Tour as a possible b-side to one of the album's upcoming singles. The song was shelved and later re-recorded for the Adrenalize album (along with "Stand Up (Kick Love into Motion)", which was deemed too similar to the album's title track. The 1988 demo version, which includes Steve Clark on guitar, was eventually released on various CD singles, album deluxe editions and box sets.

Finally, a very tongue in cheek cover of "Release Me" which was made famous by Engelbert Humperdinck in 1967 was released as a b-side under the guise of Stumpus Maximus and the Good Ol' Boys. Stumpus Maximus was Malvin Mortimer, a member of the band's road crew who later became their tour manager. The Good Ol' Boys were the members of Def Leppard, singing backup on what is essentially a parody version of the song.

During their 22 March to 10 April 2013 residency at The Joint, Def Leppard performed the album in its entirety, from start to finish. This was followed up with a live album Viva! Hysteria, recorded during the residency and released on 22 October 2013, which includes all of band's fourth studio album being played live.

This would be followed up seven years later as Hysteria: Live at the O2 was released on 29 May 2020, as part of the London to Vegas box set. The live concert was filmed at The O2 Arena in London, England on 6 December 2018, as the band once again played the album in its entirety. Various releases have included a stand-alone edition of this concert have featured combinations of audio, DVD and blu-ray discs.

In the liner notes to the album, the band apologised for the long wait between albums, and promised to never force fans to wait that long between albums again. However, later events, particularly the death of lead guitarist Steve Clark, delayed the next album, Adrenalize, by almost five years.

== Track listing ==
=== Original release ===
All tracks are written by Joe Elliott, Rick Savage, Phil Collen, Steve Clark and Robert John "Mutt" Lange, except where noted.

Side one
No.	Title	Length
1.	"Women"	5:42
2.	"Rocket"	6:37
3.	"Animal"	4:04
4.	"Love Bites"	5:46
5.	"Pour Some Sugar on Me"	4:27
6.	"Armageddon It"	5:24

Side two
No.	Title	Length
1.	"Gods of War"	6:37
2.	"Don't Shoot Shotgun"	4:26
3.	"Run Riot"	4:39
4.	"Hysteria"	5:54
5.	"Excitable"	4:19
6.	"Love and Affection"	4:37
Total length:		62:32

Japanese CD release bonus track
No.	Title	Length
13.	"Love and Affection" (live in Tilburg, Holland, June 1987)	4:50

Special Edition CD bonus tracks
No.	Title	Length
13.	"Desert Song"	5:19
14.	"Fractured Love"	5:08

=== 2006 deluxe edition ===
Disc one bonus tracks
No.	Title	Writer(s)	Origin	Length
13.	"Tear It Down"	Clark; Collen; Elliott; Savage	"Women" U.S. single and "Animal" UK single	3:38
14.	"Ride into the Sun" (1987 re-recording)	Elliott; Savage	"Hysteria" single	3:04
15.	"I Wanna Be Your Hero"		"Pour Some Sugar on Me" UK single and "Animal" U.S. single	4:32
16.	"Ring of Fire"		"Armageddon It" UK single and "Pour Some Sugar on Me" U.S. single	4:36

Disc two
No.	Title	Writer(s)	Origin	Length
1.	"Elected" (Alice Cooper cover; live in Tilburg, Holland, June 1987)	Cooper; Glen Buxton; Michael Bruce; Dennis Dunaway; Neal Smith	"Stand Up (Kick Love into Motion)" and "Heaven Is" single	4:18
2.	"Love and Affection" (live in Tilburg, Holland, June 1987)		"Hysteria" single	4:50
3.	"Billy's Got a Gun" (live in Tilburg, Holland, June 1987)	Clark; Elliott; Lange; Savage; Pete Willis	"Love Bites" single	5:21
4.	"Rock of Ages" (medley; live in Tilburg, Holland, June 1987)	Clark; Elliott; Lange; Buddy Holly; Norman Petty; ("Not Fade Away"); Pete Townshend ("My Generation"): George Kooymans; Barry Hay; ("Radar Love"); Lennon–McCartney ("Come Together"): John Bonham; Willie Dixon; John Paul Jones; Jimmy Page; Robert Plant; ("Whole Lotta Love")	"Rocket" 12" single and CD singles	8:42
5.	"Women" (live at McNichols Arena, Denver, Colorado, February 1988)		"Rocket" U.S. single and "Let's Get Rocked" UK CD single	6:29
6.	"Animal" (extended version)		"Animal" 12" single	4:40
7.	"Pour Some Sugar on Me" (extended version)			5:37
8.	"Armageddon It" (Nuclear mix)		"Armageddon It" 12" single	7:41
9.	"Excitable" (Orgasmic mix)		"Love Bites" 12" single	6:25
10.	"Rocket" (Lunar mix)		Released as single, and B-side of "Love Bites" CD single	8:42
11.	"Release Me" (Eddie Miller cover; performed by Stumpus Maximus & The Good Ol' Boys)	Miller; Robert Yount; James Pebworth	"Rocket" single and "Armageddon It" U.S. single	3:31

Notes

- "Rocket" samples dialogue from NASA's Apollo 11 launch as spoken by Jack King.
- "Gods of War" samples speeches from Ronald Reagan and Margaret Thatcher during the coda. The song also features "Solidarność" chants during the intro and coda.
- "Rock of Ages" (medley) includes "Not Fade Away", "My Generation", "Radar Love", "Come Together" and "Whole Lotta Love".

=== 30th anniversary editions ===
On 4 August 2017, the band released 30th Anniversary editions of the album. This included remasters of the original songs, B-sides and remixes from the albums era on two discs, the Classic Albums documentary episode of the making of the album, and an audio only version of the Live: In the Round, in Your Face video, recorded in Denver, Colorado at McNichols Sports Arena on 12 and 13 February 1988. This release omits four songs from the concert: "Don't Shoot Shotgun", "Let It Go", "Tear It Down" and "Travelin' Band" (a Creedence Clearwater Revival cover) as well as a Steve Clark guitar solo. Two songs, "Armageddon It" and "Pour Some Sugar On Me", were performed twice in order to record music videos.

30th anniversary edition (2017) – Disc two
No.	Title	Writer(s)	Length
1.	"Tear It Down"	Clark; Collen; Elliott; Savage	3:37
2.	"I Wanna Be Your Hero"		4:35
3.	"Ride into the Sun"	Elliott; Savage	3:07
4.	"Ring of Fire"		4:36
5.	"Women" (radio edit)		4:55
6.	"Rocket" (edit*)		4:37
7.	"Love Bites" (radio edit)		4:48
8.	"Hysteria" (radio edit)		3:48
9.	"Pour Some Sugar on Me" (radio edit)		4:22
10.	"Armageddon It" (radio edit)		4:12
11.	"Release Me"	Miller; Yount; Pebworth	3:31
12.	"Classic Albums – Hysteria – BBC Documentary"

30th anniversary edition (2017) – Disc three
No.	Title	Writer(s)	Length
1.	"Rocket" (Lunar mix – extended version)		8:40
2.	"Armageddon It" (Nuclear mix)		7:42
3.	"Animal" (extended version)		4:52
4.	"Pour Some Sugar on Me" (extended version)		5:36
5.	"Excitable" (Orgasmic mix)		6:24
6.	"Rocket" (Lunar mix)		7:06
7.	"Rock of Ages" (medley; live in Tilburg, Holland, June 1987)	Clark; Elliott; Lange; Holly; Petty; ("Not Fade Away"); Townshend ("My Generation"): Kooymans; Hay; ("Radar Love"); Lennon–McCartney ("Come Together"): Bonham; Dixon; Jones; Page; Plant; ("Whole Lotta Love")	8:39
8.	"Love and Affection" (live in Tillburg, Holland, 1987)		4:50
9.	"Billy's Got a Gun" (live in Tillburg, Holland, 1987)	Clark; Elliott; Lange; Savage; Willis	5:21

30th anniversary edition (2017) – Disc Four (Live: In the Round, In Your Face)
No.	Title	Writer(s)	Length
1.	"Stagefright"	Elliott; Lange; Savage	4:17
2.	"Rock! Rock! (Till You Drop)"	Clark; Elliott; Lange; Savage	3:32
3.	"Women"		6:14
4.	"Too Late for Love"	Clark; Elliott; Lange; Savage; Willis	5:51
5.	"Hysteria"		7:00
6.	"Gods of War"		6:32
7.	"Die Hard the Hunter"	Clark; Elliott; Lange; Savage	6:10

30th anniversary edition (2017) – Disc five (Live: In the Round, In Your Face)
No.	Title	Writer(s)	Length
1.	"Bringin' On the Heartbreak"	Clark; Elliott; Willis	6:16
2.	"Foolin'"	Clark; Elliott; Lange	5:06
3.	"Armageddon It"		5:31
4.	"Animal"		4:51
5.	"Pour Some Sugar on Me"		4:52
6.	"Phil's Solo"	Collen	3:06
7.	"Rock of Ages"	Clark; Elliott; Lange	7:42
8.	"Photograph"	Clark; Elliott; Lange; Savage; Willis	5:19

Notes

- *Mislabeled as "Lunar Mix (radio edit)", this is a rare promo mix edited from the album version. It differs heavily from the actual Lunar Mix radio edit, which contains elements from both the album version and the full-length Lunar Mix and cuts the second verse in half. The version used for the music video and for Vault significantly shortens the bridge section of the Lunar Mix radio edit.

== Personnel ==
=== Def Leppard ===
- Joe Elliott – lead vocals
- Phil Collen – guitars, backing vocals
- Steve Clark – guitars, backing vocals
- Rick Savage – bass, backing vocals, jangle guitar on "Hysteria", rhythm guitar on "Excitable"
- Rick Allen – drums, backing vocals

=== Additional personnel ===
- The Bankrupt Brothers (Def Leppard, Robert John "Mutt" Lange, Rocky Newton) – backing vocals
- Gary Kemp – additional backing vocals on "Animal" (uncredited)
- Steve Norman – additional backing vocals on "Animal" (uncredited)

=== Production ===
- Robert John "Mutt" Lange – producer
- Nigel Green – engineering, production assistance, mixing
- Ronald Prent – engineering
- Erwin Musper – engineering
- Pete Woolliscroft (Note: Misspelled as 'Pete Williscroft' in the album credits.) – engineering
- Mark Flannery – tape operation
- Philip "Art School" Nicholas – Fairlight CMI programming
- Mike Shipley – mixing
- Bob Ludwig – mastering
- Howie Weinberg – mastering
- Ross Halfin – photography
- Laurie Lewis – photography
- Andie Airfix (Satori) – illustration, artwork and design

== Charts ==
=== Weekly charts ===
Chart (1987–1989)	Peak position
Australian Albums (ARIA)	1
Canada Top Albums/CDs (RPM)	5
Dutch Albums (Album Top 100)	14
European Albums (European Top 100 Albums)	7
Finnish Albums (The Official Finnish Charts)	1
German Albums (Offizielle Top 100)	10
Japanese Albums (Oricon)	12
Norwegian Albums (VG-lista)	1
New Zealand Albums (RMNZ)	1
Swedish Albums (Sverigetopplistan)	2
Swiss Albums (Schweizer Hitparade)	2
UK Albums (Official Charts)	1
US Billboard 200	1
US Cashbox Albums Chart	1

Chart (2017–2018)	Peak position
Austrian Albums (Ö3 Austria)	71
Belgian Albums (Ultratop Flanders)	153
Belgian Albums (Ultratop Wallonia)	76
US Top Catalog Albums (Billboard)	1
US Top Rock Albums (Billboard)	5

=== Year-end charts ===
Chart (1987)	Position
Canada Top Albums/CDs (RPM)	25
European Albums (European Top 100 Albums)	53
Swiss Albums (Schweizer Hitparade)	21
US Billboard 200	93
US Cash Box	14

Chart (1988)	Position
New Zealand Albums (RMNZ)	2
US Billboard 200	3
US Cash Box	3

Chart (1989)	Position
Australian Albums (ARIA)	3
New Zealand Albums (RMNZ)	24
US Billboard 200	9

Chart (2020)	Position
US Top Rock Albums (Billboard)	75

=== Decade-end charts ===
Chart (1980–1989)	Position
Australian Albums (ARIA)	80

== Certifications and sales ==
Region	Certification	Certified units/sales
Australia (ARIA)	4× Platinum	280,000^{^}
Canada (Music Canada)	Diamond	1,000,000^{^}
Denmark (IFPI Danmark)	Gold	10,000^{‡}
Germany (BVMI)	Gold	250,000^{^}
Ireland (IRMA)	2× Platinum	30,000^{^}
Japan (RIAJ)	Gold	100,000^{^}
Malaysia	—	7,000
Mexico (AMPROFON)	Gold	100,000^{^}
New Zealand (RMNZ)	Platinum	15,000^{^}
Norway (IFPI Norway)	Gold	50,000
Sweden (GLF)	Gold	50,000^{^}
Switzerland (IFPI Switzerland)	Platinum	50,000^{^}
United Kingdom (BPI)	2× Platinum	600,000^{^}
United States (RIAA)	12× Platinum	12,000,000^{^}
^{^} Shipments figures based on certification alone.^{‡} Sales+streaming figures based on certification alone.

== See also ==
- List of best-selling albums
- List of best-selling albums in the United States
- List of most expensive albums
- List of glam metal albums and songs
- Classic Albums
- Viva! Hysteria
- Viva! Hysteria (concert residency)
