= Def Leppard & Journey 2018 Tour =

2018 concert tour by Def Leppard and Journey

- Tour by Def Leppard and Journey
- Location: Canada; United States
- Start date: May 21, 2018
- End date: October 7, 2018
- Legs: 4
- No. of shows: 60
Def Leppard tour chronology
Def Leppard World Tour (2015)	Def Leppard & Journey 2018 Tour (2018)	Hysteria & More Tour (2018)
Journey tour chronology
Eclipse Tour (2011–2013)	Def Leppard & Journey 2018 Tour (2018)	Freedom Tour (2022–2024)

The Def Leppard & Journey 2018 Tour was a co-headlining tour by the English rock band Def Leppard and the American rock band Journey. The tour began in Hartford on May 21, 2018, and concluded in Inglewood on October 7, 2018.

== Background ==
On January 19, 2018, Def Leppard announced they would be sharing the stage with Journey over the summer on a 60-city tour.

== Tour dates ==
List of 2018 concerts, showing date, city, country, venue, tickets sold, number of available tickets and amount of gross revenue
Date	City	Country	Venue	Attendance	Revenue
May 21, 2018	Hartford	United States	XL Center	9,173 / 9,754	$957,081
May 23, 2018	Albany	United States	Times Union Center	8,946 / 9,627	$834,051
May 25, 2018	Hershey	United States	Hersheypark Stadium	26,753 / 27,124	$1,894,641
May 26, 2018	Buffalo	United States	KeyBank Center	10,453 / 11,176	$988,211
May 28, 2018	Cleveland	United States	Quicken Loans Arena	9,842 / 14,736	$1,057,643
May 30, 2018	Cincinnati	United States	U.S. Bank Arena	9,026 / 10,416	$944,524
June 1, 2018	Toronto	Canada	Rogers Centre	31,429 / 45,083	$2,446,520
June 2, 2018	Pittsburgh	United States	PPG Paints Arena	13,300 / 13,910	$1,354,735
June 5, 2018	Raleigh	United States	PNC Arena	8,539 / 9,393	$882,229
June 6, 2018	Knoxville	United States	Thompson–Boling Arena	13,604 / 14,142	$1,545,770
June 8, 2018	Bristow	United States	Jiffy Lube Live	21,079 / 21,983	$1,395,529
June 9, 2018	Charlotte	United States	Spectrum Center	14,282 / 14,988	$1,636,666
June 11, 2018	Philadelphia	United States	Wells Fargo Center	10,265 / 13,545	$1,002,616
June 13, 2018	New York City	United States	Madison Square Garden	12,407 / 12,407	$1,605,251
June 15, 2018	Newark	United States	Prudential Center	10,879 / 10,879	$1,369,235
June 16, 2018	Baltimore	United States	Royal Farms Arena	9,834 / 11,400	$1,142,915
July 1, 2018	Atlanta	United States	SunTrust Park	32,801 / 32,801	$3,033,481
July 3, 2018	Noblesville	United States	Ruoff Home Mortgage Music Center	24,044 / 24,044	$1,347,998
July 4, 2018	Milwaukee	United States	American Family Insurance Amphitheater	21,695 / 21,695	$1,761,608
July 6, 2018	Memphis	United States	FedExForum	9,432 / 12,533	$1,057,740
July 7, 2018	North Little Rock	United States	Verizon Arena	13,182 / 13,182	$1,189,095
July 9, 2018	Tulsa	United States	BOK Center	11,226 / 11,226	$1,272,424
July 11, 2018	Louisville	United States	KFC Yum! Center	11,701 / 11,701	$1,186,767
July 13, 2018	Detroit	United States	Comerica Park	31,383 / 31,383	$2,521,174
July 14, 2018	Chicago	United States	Wrigley Field	35,528 / 35,528	$3,331,079
July 16, 2018	Wichita	United States	Intrust Bank Arena	8,560 / 8,560	$844,100
July 18, 2018	Sioux Falls	United States	Denny Sanford Premier Center	9,353 / 9,353	$973,474
July 19, 2018	Lincoln	United States	Pinnacle Bank Arena	10,247 / 11,164	$969,217
July 21, 2018	Denver	United States	Coors Field	44,928 / 44,928	$3,820,813
July 23, 2018	Des Moines	United States	Wells Fargo Arena	10,642 / 10,642	$1,059,915
July 25, 2018	Kansas City	United States	Sprint Center	11,754 / 11,754	$1,211,686
July 27, 2018	Minneapolis	United States	Target Field	37,960 / 37,960	$3,333,263
July 28, 2018	Fargo	United States	Fargodome	15,721 / 18,528	$1,470,695
August 11, 2018	Boston	United States	Fenway Park	34,359 / 34,359	$3,636,511
August 13, 2018	Virginia Beach	United States	Veterans United Home Loans Amphitheater	—N/a	—N/a
August 15, 2018	Columbia	United States	Colonial Life Arena	—N/a	—N/a
August 17, 2018	Sunrise	United States	BB&T Center	14,251 / 14,251	$1,704,793
August 18, 2018	Tampa	United States	Amalie Arena	15,054 / 15,054	$1,907,741
August 20, 2018	Birmingham	United States	Legacy Arena	—N/a	—N/a
August 22, 2018	Columbus	United States	Schottenstein Center	12,277 / 12,277	$1,424,915
August 24, 2018	St. Louis	United States	Busch Stadium	31,865 / 33,420	$2,395,271
August 25, 2018	Nashville	United States	Bridgestone Arena	16,823 / 16,823	$1,774,623
August 27, 2018	New Orleans	United States	Smoothie King Center	12,593 / 12,593	$1,320,007
August 29, 2018	Dallas	United States	American Airlines Center	14,295 / 14,998	$1,909,767
August 31, 2018	San Antonio	United States	AT&T Center	15,419 / 15,419	$2,054,762
September 1, 2018	Houston	United States	Toyota Center	21,184 / 21,184	$2,510,417
September 3, 2018	Houston	United States	Toyota Center	21,184 / 21,184	$2,510,417
September 7, 2018	Phoenix	United States	Talking Stick Resort Arena	13,597 / 13,597	$1,780,935
September 8, 2018	Las Vegas	United States	T-Mobile Arena	15,428 / 15,428	$1,893,913
September 18, 2018	Albuquerque	United States	Isleta Amphitheater	—N/a	—N/a
September 21, 2018	San Francisco	United States	AT&T Park	35,617 / 35,617	$3,915,971
September 23, 2018	San Diego	United States	Petco Park	34,300 / 37,999	$2,526,226
September 25, 2018	Salt Lake City	United States	Vivint Smart Home Arena	11,748 / 11,748	$1,256,245
September 26, 2018	Nampa	United States	Ford Arena	8,018 / 8,018	$835,230
September 28, 2018	Portland	United States	Moda Center	14,035 / 14,035	$1,685,561
September 29, 2018	George	United States	The Gorge Amphitheatre	21,837 / 21,934	$1,665,469
October 1, 2018	Vancouver	Canada	Rogers Arena	14,227 / 14,253	$1,245,170
October 4, 2018	Sacramento	United States	Golden 1 Center	13,907 / 13,907	$1,732,612
October 6, 2018	Inglewood	United States	The Forum	24,020 / 24,020	$2,697,656
October 7, 2018	Inglewood	United States	The Forum	24,020 / 24,020	$2,697,656
Total				—	—

== Gross ==
The tour grossed $97.8 million, with 1,000,272 tickets sold.

== Personnel ==
Def Leppard

- Joe Elliott – lead vocals
- Phil Collen – guitar, backing vocals
- Vivian Campbell – guitar, backing vocals
- Rick Savage – bass, backing vocals
- Rick Allen – drums, percussion, backing vocals

with:

- Steve Brown – guitar, backing vocals (filled-in for Phil Collen due to a family emergency May 25–28)

Journey

- Arnel Pineda – lead vocals
- Neal Schon – lead guitar, backing vocals
- Jonathan Cain – keyboards, rhythm guitar, backing vocals
- Ross Valory – bass, backing vocals
- Steve Smith – drums, percussion

with:

- Travis Thibodaux – keyboards, backing vocals

=== Opening acts ===
- Peter Frampton (Toronto)
- The Pretenders (Atlanta, Detroit, Chicago, Denver)
- Cheap Trick (Minneapolis, Boston, St. Louis, San Diego)
- Foreigner (San Francisco)
