= Undefeated (Def Leppard song) =

Single by Def Leppard

from the album Mirror Ball – Live & More
- Released: 12 April 2011
- Recorded: 2011
- Genre: Hard rock; glam metal
- Length: 4:40
- Label: Bludgeon Riffola - Mercury
- Songwriter: Joe Elliott
- Producers: Def Leppard; Ronan McHugh

Def Leppard singles chronology
"C'mon C'mon" (2008)	"Undefeated" (2011)	"It's All About Believin" (2012)

"Undefeated" is a 2011 song by English hard rock band Def Leppard from their live album Mirror Ball – Live & More. It was the first single from the album, and was released publicly via a YouTube clip on 12 April 2011 after having been played for the first time on Planet Rock the same day. The song was made available for purchase via iTunes on 16 April. The song reached 26th on Billboard's Heritage Rock charts.

== Background ==
A review of the song by Ultimate Classic Rock gave it a rating of two and a half out of five stars, and, while praising Joe Elliott's vocals, said that "[w]hile it's not a bad song, the whole thing just comes across as something that's been done before."

The song was used as the opener for most set lists for the Mirrorball and Rock of Ages 2012 tours. It was also played during the Viva! Hysteria residency in Las Vegas on 29 March 2013 where it was recorded and later released on the live album Viva! Hysteria. It also made an appearance at the 2015 World Tour, being played 18 times, and has not been played (so far) since.

== Personnel ==
- Rick Savage – bass guitar, backing vocals, additional guitars
- Joe Elliott – vocals
- Rick Allen – drums, backing vocals
- Phil Collen – guitars, backing vocals
- Vivian Campbell – guitars, backing vocals
