= List of glam metal albums and songs =

The following list of glam metal albums and songs is a list containing albums and songs described by at least one professional source as glam metal or its interchangeable terms, hair metal, lite metal, pop metal, and metal pop.

Contents
Albums: 1978 1981 1982 1983 1984 1985 1986 1987 1988 1989 1990 1991 1992 1993
Songs
Revival albums

== Albums ==
=== 1974 ===
- Kiss

=== 1977 ===
- Queens of Noise

=== 1978 ===
- Van Halen

=== 1981 ===
- Bangkok Shocks, Saigon Shakes, Hanoi Rocks
- Breaking the Chains
- Kix
- High 'n' Dry
- Too Fast for Love

=== 1982 ===
- Aldo Nova
- Dawn Patrol
- Self Destruction Blues
- Under the Blade

=== 1983 ===
- Back to Mystery City
- Bark at the Moon
- Lick It Up
- Mean Streak
- Metal Health
- Metal Magic
- Pyromania
- Headhunter
- Shout at the Devil
- You Can't Stop Rock 'n' Roll
- Zebra

=== 1984 ===
- 1984
- Animalize
- Black 'n Blue
- Bon Jovi
- Condition Critical
- Love at First Sting
- Out of the Cellar
- Penetrator
- Slide It In
- In Rock We Trust
- Stay Hungry
- This Is Spinal Tap
- Tooth and Nail
- The Blitz
- Two Steps from the Move
- Walkin' the Razor's Edge
- W.A.S.P.

=== 1985 ===
- 7800° Fahrenheit
- Asylum
- Equator
- Invasion of Your Privacy
- Midnite Dynamite
- Stay Hard
- Theatre of Pain
- Under Lock and Key
- The Right to Rock

=== 1986 ===
- 5150
- Constrictor
- Dancing Undercover
- Eat 'Em and Smile
- The Final Countdown
- Grave New World
- Lightning Strikes
- Little Miss Dangerous
- Look What the Cat Dragged In
- Mechanical Resonance
- Night Songs
- Rage for Order
- Slippery When Wet
- To Hell with the Devil
- Turbo
- The Ultimate Sin
- Vinnie Vincent Invasion

=== 1987 ===
- Appetite for Destruction
- Back for the Attack
- Crazy Nights
- Faster Pussycat
- Girls, Girls, Girls
- Hit and Run
- Hysteria
- Hurricane Eyes
- I Never Said Goodbye
- Love Is for Suckers
- Once Bitten
- Permanent Vacation
- Pride
- Raise Your Fist and Yell
- Whitesnake

=== 1988 ===
- All Systems Go
- Blow My Fuse
- Britny Fox
- BulletBoys
- Cold Lake
- Destiny
- Femme Fatale
- G N' R Lies
- Kingdom Come
- L.A. Guns
- Lita
- Long Cold Winter
- New Jersey
- Open Up and Say... Ahh!
- OU812
- Out of This World
- Up Your Alley
- Savage Amusement
- Second Sighting
- Skyscraper
- Vixen
- Winger

=== 1989 ===
- Babylon A.D.
- Badlands
- Big Game
- Blue Murder
- Cocked & Loaded
- Danger Danger
- Dangerous Toys
- Dirty Rotten Filthy Stinking Rich
- Dr. Feelgood
- Eat the Heat
- Enuff Z'nuff
- Extreme
- The Great Radio Controversy
- Gorky Park
- Hot in the Shade
- Intuition
- Leather Boyz with Electric Toyz
- Love + War
- No Fuel Left for the Pilgrims
- Not Fakin' It
- Psycho Cafe
- Pump
- Skid Row
- Slip of the Tongue
- Sonic Temple
- Trash
- ...Twice Shy
- Wake Me When It's Over

=== 1990 ===
- After the Rain
- Alias
- Blackout in the Red Room
- Cherry Pie
- Crazy World
- Detonator
- Empire
- FireHouse
- Flesh & Blood
- Rev It Up
- Pornograffitti
- Stick It to Ya
- Tattooed Millionaire

=== 1991 ===
- Bite Down Hard
- Freakshow
- Hey Stoopid
- Hooked
- Lean Into It
- A Little Ain't Enough
- The Nymphs
- Psychotic Supper
- Saints and Sinners
- Slave to the Grind
- Strength
- Use Your Illusion I
- Use Your Illusion II

=== 1992 ===
- Adrenalize
- Dog Eat Dog
- Don't Tread
- Double Eclipse
- Generation Terrorists
- Jackyl
- Keep the Faith
- The Lizard

=== 1993 ===
- Earthquake Visions
- Exposed
- Gold Against the Soul
- Za-Za

== Songs ==
=== 0-9 ===
- 10,000 Lovers (In One)
- 18 and Life

=== A ===
- Alone Again
- Angel
- Animal
- Armageddon It

=== B ===
- Bad Medicine
- The Ballad of Jayne
- Big City Nights
- Black Cat
- Born to Be My Baby
- Bringin' On the Heartbreak

=== C ===
- Can't Get Enuff
- Cherry Pie
- Close My Eyes Forever
- Crazy
- Crazy Crazy Nights
- Crazy Night
- Crying in the Rain
- Cry Tough
- Cum on Feel the Noize

=== D ===
- Don't Close Your Eyes
- Don't Go Away Mad (Just Go Away)
- Don't Know What You Got (Till It's Gone)
- Don't Treat Me Bad
- Don't You Ever Leave Me
- Down Boys
- Dude (Looks Like a Lady)
- Dr. Feelgood
- Dream Warriors
- Dreams
- Decadence Dance (song)
- Edison's Medicine
- Every Rose Has Its Thorn

=== F ===
- Fallen Angel
- Fantasy
- The Final Countdown
- Fly High Michelle
- Fly to the Angels
- Fool for Your Loving

=== G ===
- Get the Funk Out
- Girls, Girls, Girls
- Girlschool
- Gypsy Road

=== H ===
- Heaven
- Heaven's on Fire
- Here I Go Again
- High Enough
- Home Sweet Home
- Hot for Teacher
- House of Pain
- Hysteria

=== I ===
- I Live My Life For You^{[104]}
- I Remember You
- I Saw Red
- I Wanna Be Somebody
- I Wanna Rock
- I'll Be There for You
- I Hate Myself for Loving You
- I'll Never Let You Go
- I'll See You in My Dreams
- I'll Sleep When I'm Dead
- In and Out of Love
- In My Dreams
- Into the Fire
- Is This Love

=== J ===
- Janie's Got a Gun
- Jump

=== K ===
- Keep the Faith
- Kickstart My Heart
- Kiss Me Deadly

=== L ===
- Lay It Down
- Lay Your Hands on Me
- Lick It Up
- Live Wire
- Livin' on a Prayer
- Love Bites
- Love in an Elevator
- Love of a Lifetime
- Love Song

=== M ===
- Metal Health (Bang Your Head)
- Miles Away
- More Than Words

=== N ===
- New Thing
- No More Tears
- No One Like You
- Nobody's Fool
- Nothin' But a Good Time

=== O ===
- Once Bitten, Twice Shy
- The Other Side

=== P ===
- Panama
- Paradise City
- Patience
- Photograph
- Poison
- Pour Some Sugar on Me

=== R ===
- Rag Doll
- Reason to Live
- Rock of Ages
- Rock You Like a Hurricane
- Round and Round
- Runaway

=== S ===
- Same Ol' Situation (S.O.S.)
- Screaming in the Night
- Seventeen
- Shelter Me
- Shut Up and Dance
- Sister Christian
- Slave to the Grind
- Smokin' in the Boys Room
- Something to Believe In
- Sometimes She Cries
- Still Loving You
- Still of the Night
- Summertime Girls
- Sweet Child o' Mine

=== T ===
- Talk Dirty to Me
- Tears Are Falling
- To Be with You
- Top of the World
- Too Young to Fall in Love
- Tragedy
- Turbo Lover
- Turn Up the Radio

=== U ===
- Uncle Tom's Cabin
- Unskinny Bop
- Up All Night

=== W ===
- Wait
- Wanted Dead or Alive
- Way Cool Jr.
- Welcome to the Jungle
- We're Not Gonna Take It
- When It's Love
- When the Children Cry
- When You Close Your Eyes
- Wind of Change
- Without You
- Why Can't This Be Love

=== Y ===
- Yankee Rose
- (You Can Still) Rock in America
- You Give Love a Bad Name
- (You Make Me) Rock Hard
- Your Mama Don't Dance
- Youth Gone Wild

== Revival albums ==
- American Hardcore (1996)
- Euphoria (1999)
- Live Era '87–'93 (1999)
- Shrinking Violet (1999)
- New Tattoo
- Cocked & Re-Loaded (2000)
- Just Push Play (2001)
- Permission to Land (2003)
- Rest in Sleaze (2005)
- Feel the Steel (2009)
- Balls Out (2011)

== See also ==
- Glam metal
- List of glam metal bands and artists
