= Women (Def Leppard song) =

1987 single by Def Leppard

Single by Def Leppard

from the album Hysteria
- B-side: "Tear It Down"
- Released: August 1987
- Recorded: 1984–1986
- Genre: Glam metal
- Length: 5:41 (album version); 4:57 (single edit)
- Label: Mercury
- Songwriters: Joe Elliott; Phil Collen; Steve Clark; Rick Savage; Robert John "Mutt" Lange
- Producer: Robert John "Mutt" Lange

Def Leppard singles chronology
"Animal" (1987)	"Women" (1987)	"Pour Some Sugar on Me" (1987)

Music videos
- "Women" on YouTube

"Women" is a song released by English rock band Def Leppard in 1987 from the album Hysteria. It was the second overall but first single of the album released in the United States. The song was also released as a single in Canada, Australia, Japan, and was part of a double-A side single with "Animal" in Germany. In most other parts of the world, "Animal" was the first single released from the album.

== Background ==
The single's B-side track, "Tear It Down", was written during a recording session following the completion of the Hysteria album, where the band laid down several tracks intended as B-sides for the Hysteria singles. Subsequently, the song itself received radio airplay and was later performed by the band live at the 1989 MTV Video Music Awards.

The band later re-recorded "Tear It Down" for the Adrenalize album.

"Women" is the only one of the seven Hysteria singles not to appear on the Vault compilation. However, it is included in disc 2 of Rock of Ages: The Definitive Collection.

== Music video ==
The music video for "Women" focuses on a boy who reads a comic book outside an abandoned warehouse while the band performs inside. The comic book, titled "Def Leppard and the Women of Doom!", features a skateboarding protagonist named Def Leppard, who travels to a distant planet and battles evil aliens to liberate female robots. This was also the first video filmed after drummer Rick Allen became an amputee after losing his left arm in an auto collision.

== Track listing ==
US Mercury Records 888 757-7 DJ 7" single

Side A
No.	Title	Length
1.	"Women" (LP version)	5:43

Side B
No.	Title	Length
1.	"Women" (edit version)	4:57

US Mercury Records 888 757-7 7" single

Side A
No.	Title	Length
1.	"Women" (LP version)	5:43

Side B
No.	Title	Length
1.	"Tear It Down"	3:38

US CD single

No.	Title	Length
1.	"Women" (album version)	5:41
2.	"Tear It Down"	3:37
3.	"Women" (Edit)	4:57

Canada 7" single

Side A
No.	Title	Length
1.	"Women" (edit version)	4:57

Side B
No.	Title	Length
1.	"Tear It Down"	3:38

== Personnel ==
=== Def Leppard ===
- Joe Elliott – lead vocals
- Steve Clark – rhythm guitars, backing vocals
- Phil Collen – lead guitars, backing vocals
- Rick Savage – bass, backing vocals
- Rick Allen – drums

=== Additional personnel ===
- Philip "Art School" Nicholas – keyboards

== Charts ==
Chart (1987)	Peak position
Australia (Kent Music Report)	100
US Billboard Hot 100	80
US Mainstream Rock (Billboard)	7

== See also ==
- Hysteria (Def Leppard album)
- Animal (Def Leppard song)
- Pour Some Sugar on Me
- Rocket (Def Leppard song)
- Def Leppard discography
