= Armageddon It =

1988 single by Def Leppard

Single by Def Leppard

from the album Hysteria
- B-side: "Ring of Fire" (UK); "Release Me" (US)
- Released: March 1988 (UK); November 1988 (US)
- Recorded: 1984–1987
- Genre: Hard rock; pop metal
- Length: 5:24 (Atomic mix/album version); 4:39 (Promo 45 Version); 7:39 (Nuclear mix)
- Label: Mercury
- Songwriters: Joe Elliott; Rick Savage; Phil Collen; Steve Clark; Robert John "Mutt" Lange
- Producer: Robert John "Mutt" Lange

Def Leppard singles chronology
| "Hysteria" (1987) | "Armageddon It" (1988) | "Love Bites" (1988) |

Music video
- "Armageddon It" on YouTube

"Armageddon It" is a song by the English rock band Def Leppard from their 1987 album Hysteria. It was released as a single in 1988 and went to number 3 in the US, becoming their third Top 10 hit. It also reached the Top 10 in Canada and New Zealand and the Top 20 in Ireland and the United Kingdom.

The vocal style of the song is described as "T. Rex meets Eddie Cochran with backing vocals", according to lead singer Joe Elliott in the liner notes for Vault: Def Leppard Greatest Hits (1980–1995). There are two mixes of the song that appeared on the single: the "Atomic mix", which is the album version, and the "Nuclear mix", which is an extended version.

== Writing and recording ==
"Armageddon It" was one of the songs dating back to the initial writing sessions for Hysteria in Dublin in 1984. However, the original song was re-written, keeping the chord progression and key, as Steve Clark elaborated: "The chorus wasn’t strong enough so we changed the chorus. Then we thought the chorus is so strong the verse is a bit weak. We rewrote the verse and said the bridge stinks. There’s not one existing note from the original, but a progression that went over about three years."

== Music video ==
The video for the song was the second to feature Def Leppard in a live arena setting. On 12–13 February 1988, the band recorded two shows at the McNichols Arena in Denver, Colorado for a future live film release. However, a month later, "Armageddon It" was set to be released as the sixth single off the popular Hysteria album and a promo video clip was urgently needed.

From the band's end, there was hesitation to film another concept video. Although they were happy with the results for "Hysteria" and "Animal", they were very unsatisfied with the way "Pour Some Sugar on Me" had turned out for its concept. Therefore, an idea was pitched to quickly create a video edited from the Denver footage. It was another hit in the UK, reaching the Top 20. Months later, it was released in the United States and was even more successful, reaching the Top 3. However, "Pour Some Sugar on Me" was the first song used there for the "live" concept (in fact, many of the scenes are the same in the two), but instead of filming a different video, slight changes were made using footage filmed in October at the Omni in Atlanta, Georgia.

== Track listings ==
CD: Bludgeon Riffola / LEPCD4 (UK) / 870 239-2 (INT)

1. "Armageddon It"
2. "Ring of Fire"
3. "Animal"
4. "Pour Some Sugar on Me"

7-inch: Bludgeon Riffola / Vertigo / 872 692-7P (CANADA) / picture disc

1. "Armageddon It"
2. "Release Me"

7-inch: Bludgeon Riffola / Polygram / Mercury / 872 692-7 (INT)

1. "Armageddon It"
2. "Release Me"

== Personnel ==
- Joe Elliott – lead vocals
- Steve Clark – lead guitar, backing vocals
- Phil Collen – rhythm guitar, ride-out guitar solo, backing vocals
- Rick Savage – bass, backing vocals
- Rick Allen – drums, backing vocals

== Charts ==
=== Weekly charts ===
| Chart (1988–1989) | Peak position |
|---|---|
| Australia (ARIA) | 34 |
| Canada Top Singles (RPM) | 8 |
| Europe (Eurochart Hot 100) | 72 |
| Ireland (IRMA) | 11 |
| New Zealand (Recorded Music NZ) | 2 |
| UK Singles (Official Charts) | 20 |
| US Billboard Hot 100 | 3 |
| US Mainstream Rock (Billboard) | 3 |

=== Year-end charts ===
| Chart (1988) | Position |
|---|---|
| New Zealand (Recorded Music NZ) | 34 |

| Chart (1989) | Position |
|---|---|
| Canada Top Singles (RPM) | 97 |
| US Billboard Hot 100 | 53 |

== See also ==
- List of glam metal albums and songs
