= Love Bites (Def Leppard song) =

1988 single by Def Leppard

Single by Def Leppard

from the album Hysteria
- B-side: "Billy's Got a Gun" (live)
- Released: 4 July 1988
- Genre: Glam metal
- Length: 5:46
- Label: Mercury
- Songwriters: Robert John "Mutt" Lange; Phil Collen; Steve Clark; Joe Elliott; Rick Savage
- Producer: Robert John "Mutt" Lange

Def Leppard singles chronology
"Armageddon It" (1988)	"Love Bites" (1988)	"Rocket" (1989)

Music video
- "Love Bites" on YouTube

"Love Bites" is a song by English glam metal band Def Leppard from their 1987 album Hysteria. The power ballad is Def Leppard's only number-one single on the US Billboard Hot 100 and became a Top 10 hit in Canada, Ireland, and New Zealand. The track peaked at number 11 on the UK Singles Chart.

== Song history and composition ==
When Robert John "Mutt" Lange originally brought the song to the band's attention, it was a country ballad, which the band thought sounded like nothing they had done before. The band then added power rock elements and emotive backing vocals similar to those used in R&B ballads at the time. The title "Love Bites" was originally used for a very different song that was eventually re-titled "I Wanna Be Your Hero", and which appeared as a Hysteria B-side and later on the album Retro Active. Musically, the song has been described as glam metal, and is considered a classic of the genre.

Following the huge momentum generated by "Pour Some Sugar on Me", the song was released in August 1988 and peaked atop the US Billboard Hot 100 for one week in October of that year. The song also reached number eleven in the United Kingdom, number two in New Zealand, number three in Canada, and number seven in Ireland. The "Love Bites" 45 release in Canada and UK included limited edition gatefold with complete "Hysteria" lyrics. This was the only official release of the "Hysteria" lyrics.

== In other media ==
In August 2026, the song appeared in the extended look for the upcoming video game Grand Theft Auto VI. It is playing when one of the protagonists, Lucia Caminos, asks Jason Duval which dress to wear to go out.

== Reception ==
AllMusic called it "one of the most satisfying songs in the Def Leppard catalog, as well as one of the best products of the late-'80s power ballad craze."

== Track listings ==
"Billy's Got a Gun" was recorded at Tilburg, Netherlands, in 1987.

7-inch: Polygram/870-402-7 (US)

1. "Love Bites" (5:46)
2. "Billy's Got a Gun" (live) (5:21)

7-inch: Polygram /870-402-7 (DJ) (US)

1. "Love Bites" (Radio Edit) (4:45)
2. "Love Bites" (Radio Edit) (4:45)

== Personnel ==
- Joe Elliott – lead vocals
- Phil Collen – rhythm guitar, backing vocals
- Steve Clark – lead guitar
- Rick Savage – bass, backing vocals
- Rick Allen – drums
- Robert John "Mutt" Lange – backing vocals

== Charts ==
=== Weekly charts ===
Chart (1988–1989)	Peak position
Australia (ARIA)	21
Canada Top Singles (RPM)	3
Canada Retail Singles (RPM)	1
Europe (Eurochart Hot 100)	38
Ireland (IRMA)	7
Italy Airplay (Music & Media)	18
Netherlands (Dutch Top 40)	25
Netherlands (Single Top 100)	23
New Zealand (Recorded Music NZ)	2
UK Singles (Official Charts)	11
US Billboard Hot 100	1
US Mainstream Rock Airplay (Billboard)	3
US Cash Box Top 100	1

=== Year-end charts ===
Chart (1988)	Position
Canada Top Singles (RPM)	51
New Zealand (RIANZ)	25
US Billboard Hot 100	30
US Album Rock Tracks (Billboard)	47

Chart (1989)	Position
Australia (ARIA)	84

== Certifications ==
Region	Certification	Certified units/sales
New Zealand (RMNZ)	Platinum	30,000^{‡}
^{‡} Sales+streaming figures based on certification alone.

== See also ==
- List of glam metal albums and songs
- List of Billboard Hot 100 number ones of 1988
