= Foolin' =

Single by Def Leppard

from the album Pyromania
- B-side: "Comin' Under Fire"
- Released: August 1983 (US)
- Recorded: 1982
- Studio: Park Gates (Battle, East Sussex); Battery (London)
- Genre: Heavy metal
- Length: 4:34
- Label: Mercury
- Songwriters: Joe Elliott; Steve Clark; Robert John "Mutt" Lange
- Producer: Robert John "Mutt" Lange

Def Leppard singles chronology
"Rock of Ages" (1983)	"Foolin'" (1983)	"Too Late for Love" (1983)

Music video
- "Foolin'" on YouTube

"Foolin'" is a 1983 single by English hard rock band Def Leppard from their diamond album Pyromania. When released as a single later that year, it reached #9 on the Mainstream Rock chart and #28 on the US Billboard Hot 100.

Cash Box said "Foolin'" has "structural similarities to [earlier Def Leppard single] 'Photograph' and follows in that single’s skillful pop blend of melodicism and metallicism." Ultimate Classic Rock described the song as a "mid-tempo rocker".

== Music video ==
The music video was shot in June 1983 at the Ritz Theatre in Elizabeth, New Jersey, and directed by David Mallet. The video shows Elliott escaping from his evil girlfriend in a fantasy sequence, interspersed with scenes of the band performing on a concert stage. It features Billy Idol's then-girlfriend Perri Lister playing the harp with her eyes closed. On the video compilation Historia, the text commentary before this video states, "A face without eyes indeed", a pun on Idol's song "Eyes Without a Face". There is also a rare "Performance Only" version of the video, which focuses solely on the concert scenes. This version was briefly shown during the Ultimate Albums episode of the making of Pyromania in 2002.

== Track listing ==
=== 7": Mercury / PolyGram / 814-178-7 (US) ===
1. "Foolin'"
2. "Comin' Under Fire"

== Charts ==
Chart (1983)	Peak position
Canada Top Singles (RPM)	39
US Billboard Hot 100	28
US Mainstream Rock (Billboard)	9
