= Hysteria (Def Leppard song) =

1987 song by Def Leppard

Single by Def Leppard

from the album Hysteria
- B-side: "Ride into the Sun"
- Released: 16 November 1987 (UK); January 1988 (US); 19 March 2013 (re-recorded version)
- Recorded: 1985–1987; 2012 (re-recorded version)
- Genre: Glam metal
- Length: 5:54 (album version); 3:50 (single edit)
- Label: Mercury
- Songwriters: Rick Savage; Phil Collen; Joe Elliott; Steve Clark; Robert John "Mutt" Lange
- Producer: Robert John "Mutt" Lange

Def Leppard singles chronology
"Pour Some Sugar on Me" (1987)	"Hysteria" (1987)	"Armageddon It" (1988)

Music videos
- "Hysteria" on YouTube

"Hysteria" is a song by English rock band Def Leppard. It is the tenth track on their 1987 album of the same name and was released as the album's fourth single in November 1987. The song became the band's first top 10 hit on the Billboard Hot 100, peaking at number 10.

== Overview ==
On VH1 Storytellers: Def Leppard, lead singer Joe Elliott revealed that the song title came from drummer Rick Allen. The song features a clean guitar melody and heavily multi-tracked vocals in its chorus. The "extreme" nature of producer Mutt Lange's recording methods is also exampled in the pre-chorus, where the clean guitar chords were recorded one note at a time as opposed to the traditional method of strumming them, in effect "building" a chord by recording the notes that make them up. An acoustic rendition of the song was performed by Elliott and guitarist Phil Collen on the Hysteria edition of VH1's Classic Albums.

Cash Box called it a "solid rocker with sophistication, Supertramp-ish chorus backgrounds and a cutting edge vocal."

== Track listing ==
=== 7": Bludgeon Riffola / Mercury / 870 004-7 (US) ===
1. "Hysteria"
2. "Ride into the Sun"

=== 12": Bludgeon Riffola / Phonogram (UK) ===
1. "Hysteria"
2. "Ride into the Sun"
3. "Love and Affection" (live)

=== CD: Bludgeon Riffola / Phonogram / U.K. LEPCD3 / INT. 870 004-2 (UK) ===
1. "Hysteria"
2. "Ride into the Sun"
3. "Love and Affection" (live)
4. "I Wanna Be Your Hero"

== Other versions ==
- Lovedrug recorded a version of "Hysteria", along with a making-of video, for the fan-chosen covers album from the I AM LOVEDRUG campaign. The album, titled Best of I AM LOVEDRUG, was released 28 June 2011.
- Def Leppard themselves re-recorded the song in 2012 (along with "Rock of Ages" and "Pour Some Sugar On Me") and released it as a digital download on 19 March 2013.
- In 2018, singer-songwriter Matt Nathanson covered "Hysteria" on Pyromattia. The album is composed entirely of Def Leppard covers and features songs from High 'N' Dry, Pyromania, Hysteria, and Euphoria.

== Charts ==
=== Weekly charts ===
Chart (1987–1988)	Peak position
Australia (Australian Music Report)	90
Canada Top Singles (RPM)	13
Ireland (IRMA)	19
Italy Airplay (Music & Media)	18
UK Singles (OCC)	26
US Billboard Hot 100	10
US Cash Box	11
US Mainstream Rock (Billboard)	9

Chart (1989)	Peak position
Australia (ARIA)	77

== Certifications ==
Certifications for "Hysteria"
Region	Certification	Certified units/sales
New Zealand (RMNZ)	Platinum	30,000^{‡}
United Kingdom (BPI)	Silver	200,000^{‡}
^{‡} Sales+streaming figures based on certification alone.
