= Rocket (Def Leppard song) =

Single by Def Leppard

from the album Hysteria
- B-side: "Release Me" (UK); "Women" (live) (US)
- Released: 30 January 1989 (UK); February 1989 (US)
- Recorded: 1984–1987
- Genre: Glam metal
- Length: 6:34 (album version); 8:41 (extended Lunar mix); 7:06 (Lunar mix/remix); 4:38 (edit); 4:25 (Lunar mix – single version); 4:10 (video version); 4:07 (Visualize video edit/Vault version)
- Label: Mercury
- Songwriters: Joe Elliott; Phil Collen; Steve Clark; Rick Savage; Robert John "Mutt" Lange
- Producer: Robert John "Mutt" Lange

Def Leppard singles chronology
| "Love Bites" (1988) | "Rocket" (1989) | "Let's Get Rocked" (1992) |

Music video
- "Rocket" on YouTube

"Rocket" is a song recorded by English rock band Def Leppard in 1987 from the album Hysteria. It was released in January 1989 as the seventh and final single from the album and reached the Top 15 on the US Billboard Hot 100 and UK Singles Chart. It is the band’s final single to be released with guitarist Steve Clark before his death in 1991.

== Background and composition ==
Singer Joe Elliott came up with the idea of "Rocket" after he overheard a friend's cassette of "Burundi Black" by Burundi Steiphenson Black, which had previously had an influence on such UK bands as Adam and the Ants and Bow Wow Wow. Elliott then borrowed the tape to make a rhythm loop and overlaid guitar chords over it for a rough draft on the song. When he brought it to Lange and the band, they re-recorded and developed Elliott's idea in a higher key. The song was nearly developed as a near-instrumental with only a short chorus ("Rocket! Yeah"), but after the lyrics "satellite of love", which referenced the song of the same name by Lou Reed in 1972, were added to the chorus, the band expanded on the concept of the song and added musical influences of the 1960s and 1970s as lyrics for the verses, including the vocal melody to "I Feel Free" by Cream as part of the guitar solo.

During one break in the production of the song, the band were surprised to find that Lange had added the extended breakdown, complete with the vocal sampling, to the middle of the song. Lange also instructed the band to record monk-like chants, that were also similarly used by Adam and the Ants in their song "Dog Eat Dog", to emphasize a guitar solo during the breakdown. Although the drumbeat samples, played at the beginning of the extended and edited version after audio from the Apollo 11 Moon landing and again during the first half of each verse and the breakdown, are widely mis-attributed to be taken from the Royal Drummers of Burundi, they are actually a series of drum machines programmed by Lange and drummer Rick Allen to play slightly out of sync with one another to provide a tribal drum effect within the song.

== Release and promotion ==
The song features nods to other tracks on Hysteria. Producer Mutt Lange used backmasking effects to feature the line "We're fighting with the gods of war" (from "Gods of War") sung backward throughout the track, though this sample was omitted from the single version of the song. The words "Love" and "Bites" (from "Love Bites") are also used as a sonic effect midway throughout the song, in order to replicate the sounds of a rocket launch through musical samples.

In its single release, "Rocket" was heavily edited from its original length of 6:34 for radio airplay. The band alternate between the album version and the single edit in live performance. UK versions of the single release featured a cover of the Engelbert Humperdinck song "Release Me", credited to "Stumpus Maximus & The Good Ol' Boys", which was actually Malvin Mortimer, the band's future tour manager, backed up by the band members themselves.

== Critical reception ==
Reviewing the single in the 4 February 1989 edition of Record Mirror, Phil Cheeseman chided the song for lack of class and supposed that the band "caught lethargy bug". Stuart Maconie of New Musical Express echoed by saying "this thing sounds like a vile mating of Whitesnake. Actually, it doesn't since that sounds quite fun in a tasteless sort of way". B-side cover song, "Release Me", was called as "scuzzbucket". In turn, Mick Mercer of Melody Maker left more positive response on single. He found the title track "more amenable than their recent singles" and called it "positively trivial in parts". Cash Box said that "the song structure in 'Rocket' relies on stacked vocal harmonies that build to an almost facetiously simple chorus."

Guitar World magazine voted Rocket's guitar solo the 17th worst of all time in a countdown published in December 2004's issue. The magazine commented that "[Rocket has] a solo that any four year-old with a rack-mounted effects unit could play."

== Music video ==
The music video for this song was directed by Nigel Dick.

The video is the band's last with Steve Clark before his death in 1991. It was filmed in the same warehouse in the Netherlands used nearly two years earlier for the "Women" clip in 1987. The lyrics and video are centered around the 1970s with various newsreels including Richard Nixon's disgrace, Edward Heath's fall from power to Margaret Thatcher as leader of the Conservatives, the Apollo 13 crisis, and a variety of clips/newsreels of 70's music icons. Clips of the classic rock names from the lyrics (see below) are flashed during the video, along with footage of the various artists performing live or on BBC TV's Top of the Pops. The 1971 FA Cup Final, won by Arsenal, also features; particularly goal scorer, club legend and crowd favourite Charlie George.

== Lyrics ==
For its lyrics, the names of classic rock artists, songs or albums of the 50s, 60s and 70s are dropped as a tribute to the music of the band's youth.

- "Jack Flash" – The song "Jumpin' Jack Flash" by the Rolling Stones, 1968
- "Rocket Man" – The song of the same name by Elton John, 1972
- "Sgt. Pepper & the Band" – The album Sgt. Peppers Lonely Hearts Club Band by the Beatles, 1967
- "Ziggy" – The track/character of "Ziggy Stardust" from David Bowie's album The Rise and Fall of Ziggy Stardust, 1972
- "Bennie and the Jets" – The song of the same name by Elton John, 1973
- "Satellite of Love" – The song of the same name by Lou Reed, 1972
- "Laser Love" – The song of the same name by T. Rex, 1976
- "Jet Black" – A reference to the drummer "Jet Black" from the band The Stranglers
- "Johnny B." – A reference to the song "Johnny B. Goode" by Chuck Berry, 1958
- "Jean Genie" – The song of the same name by David Bowie, 1973
- "Killer Queen" – The song of the same name by Queen, 1974
- "Dizzy Lizzy" – A reference to the song "Dizzy Miss Lizzy", made famous by the Beatles, 1965 (also a nod to Thin Lizzy)
- "Major Tom" – A reference to the song "Space Oddity" by David Bowie, 1969

== Track listing ==
=== 7": Mercury (US)/Vertigo (CAN) / 872 614-7 ===
1. "Rocket" (Lunar mix) (4:17)
2. "Women" (live) (6:32)

=== 12" PROMO: Mercury / PRO 705-1 (US) ===
1. "Rocket" (album version) (6:34)
2. "Rocket" (Lunar mix) (4:17)

=== 7": Bludgeon Riffola / 872-430-7 (UK) ===
1. "Rocket"
2. "Release Me"

=== CDV: Bludgeon Riffola /PAL 080 990-2 (UK) ===
1. "Rocket (Radio edit) (4:24)
2. "Release Me" (3:32)
3. "Rock of Ages" (live) (9:15)
4. "Rocket" (Video) (4:10)

=== 12" Picture Disc: Bludgeon Riffola / LEPXP6 (UK) ===
1. "Rocket" (Lunar mix)
2. "Rocket" (radio edit)
3. "Release Me"

=== CD Single: Bludgeon Riffola/ 872-431-2 (UK) ===
1. "Rocket" (4:29)
2. "Rock of Ages" (live) (9:18)
3. "Release Me" (3:31)

=== CD (Limited Edition):Vertigo / 872 614-2 (CAN) ===
1. "Rocket" (The Lunar mix-Extended version) (9:31)
2. "Women" (live) (6:32)
3. "Rock of Ages" (live) (9:16)
4. "Rocket" (The Lunar mix-Single version) (4:26)
- Only 5000 copies pressed

== Charts ==
=== Weekly charts ===
| Chart (1989–1990) | Peak position |
|---|---|
| Australia (ARIA) | 15 |
| Canada Top Singles (RPM) | 14 |
| Ireland (IRMA) | 5 |
| New Zealand (Recorded Music NZ) | 5 |
| UK Singles (Official Charts) | 15 |
| US Billboard Hot 100 | 12 |
| US Mainstream Rock (Billboard) | 5 |
