= Animal (Def Leppard song) =

1987 single by Def Leppard

Single by Def Leppard

from the album Hysteria
- B-side: "Tear It Down" (UK); "I Wanna Be Your Hero" (US)
- Released: 20 July 1987 (UK); 25 September 1987 (US)
- Recorded: 1984–1986
- Genre: Pop metal
- Length: 4:04 (7" version); 4:52 (12" version)
- Label: Mercury
- Songwriters: Joe Elliott; Phil Collen; Steve Clark; Rick Savage; Robert John "Mutt" Lange
- Producer: Robert John "Mutt" Lange

Def Leppard singles chronology
"Bringin' On the Heartbreak" (remix) (1984)	"Animal" (1987)	"Women" (1987)

Music video
- "Animal" on YouTube

"Animal" is a song recorded by English rock band Def Leppard in 1987 from the album Hysteria. It was the first single release off the album, and became the band's first Top 10 hit in their native UK, reaching No. 6 on the UK Singles Chart.

== Recording ==
"Animal" is usually noted by the band as having been the most difficult track to record for Hysteria. It was one of the first songs developed in early 1984, but neither the band nor successive producers Jim Steinman and Robert John "Mutt" Lange were able to produce the desired sound until two and a half painstaking years later. It was the only Hysteria track demoed by Rick Allen on an acoustic drum kit prior to his car accident; the drummer having recorded a beat for the song on a four-track tape during early sessions. A later studio version, tracked to a drum machine, remained largely the same as the earlier demo, which the band felt was starting to sound dated, until Joe Elliott recorded a lead vocal over it in Paris in July 1985. Lange and the band were so impressed with that vocal that they rewrote and rerecorded the backing track around it.

The effort paid off when "Animal" was released as the lead single from the album in July 1987. In the UK, where the band had less success during the Pyromania era, the song hit #6 on the singles chart and broke Def Leppard into the pop mainstream across Europe. "When people saw us on Top of the Pops doing 'Animal'," remarked Elliot, "they heard a really great song that, style-wise, had more in common with INXS or U2, The Police with 'Roxanne'… And that was the band we wanted to be."

In America, the lead single "Women" performed poorly on the pop charts, which did not give much momentum when "Animal" was released afterwards in October 1987. The latter did however reach a respectable #19, beginning Leppard's run of ten consecutive US Billboard Top 40 singles, and became one of the most enduringly popular numbers at Def Leppard concerts.

The single's UK B-side, "Tear It Down", was written during a recording session after the completion of the Hysteria album. The band laid down tracks intended as B-sides for the Hysteria singles; "Tear It Down" itself received radio airplay. The band later rerecorded it for the Adrenalize album.

== Track listing ==
=== 7": Bludgeon Riffola / LEP1 (UK) ===
On the back cover, there is a picture of the band on train rails. The photograph was taken by Laurie Lewis.

1. "Animal"
2. "Tear It Down"

=== 12": Bludgeon Riffola / LEPX 1 (UK) ===
1. "Animal" (extended version)
2. "Animal"
3. "Tear It Down"

=== 7": Mercury / PolyGram / 888-832-7 (US) ===
1. "Animal"
2. "I Wanna Be Your Hero"

== Personnel ==
- Joe Elliott – lead vocals
- Phil Collen – lead guitar, backing vocals
- Steve Clark – rhythm guitar, backing vocals
- Rick Savage – bass guitar, backing vocals
- Rick Allen – drums

== Charts ==
Chart (1987)	Peak position
Australia (Kent Music Report)	46
Belgium (Ultratop 50 Flanders)	32
Canada Top Singles (RPM)	21
Ireland (IRMA)	3
Italy Airplay (Music & Media)	17
Netherlands (Single Top 100)	20
New Zealand (Recorded Music NZ)	8
Switzerland (Schweizer Hitparade)	17
UK Singles (Official Charts)	6
US Billboard Hot 100	19
US Mainstream Rock (Billboard)	5

== Certifications ==
Region	Certification	Certified units/sales
New Zealand (RMNZ)	Gold	15,000^{‡}
United Kingdom (BPI)	Silver	200,000^{‡}
^{‡} Sales+streaming figures based on certification alone.

== See also ==
- List of glam metal albums and songs
