= Pour Some Sugar on Me =

1987 single by Def Leppard

Single by Def Leppard

from the album Hysteria
- B-side: "I Wanna Be Your Hero" (UK); "Ring of Fire" (US)
- Released: 7 September 1987
- Recorded: December 1986 – January 1987
- Genre: Glam metal; hard rock; arena rock; pop rock
- Length: 4:27 (album version); 4:24 (single version); 4:52 (Hysteria video edit version); 5:35 (extended version); 4:21 (2012 re-recorded version)
- Label: Mercury
- Songwriters: Joe Elliott; Robert John "Mutt" Lange; Phil Collen; Steve Clark; Rick Savage
- Producer: Robert John "Mutt" Lange

Def Leppard singles chronology
"Women" (1987)	"Pour Some Sugar on Me" (1987)	"Hysteria" (1987)

Audio sample
- "Pour Some Sugar on Me": file; help

Music videos
- "Pour Some Sugar on Me" (UK version) on YouTube
- "Pour Some Sugar on Me" (U.S. version) on YouTube

"Pour Some Sugar on Me" is a song by the English rock band Def Leppard from their 1987 album Hysteria. It reached number two on the US Billboard Hot 100 chart on 23 July 1988. "Pour Some Sugar on Me" is considered the band's signature song, and was ranked number two on VH1's "100 Greatest Songs of the 80s" in 2006.

== Musical style ==
"Pour Some Sugar on Me" has been labelled as a glam metal, hard rock, arena rock, and pop rock song with elements of industrial rock and electropop.

== Production ==
The song came about by accident as a last-minute addition to Hysteria. Near the end of recording the album, while on a tea break during vocal sessions, lead singer Joe Elliott was jamming with a riff he had come up with some time earlier on an acoustic guitar. Producer Robert John "Mutt" Lange, expressing great liking of it, suggested that it be developed into another song, with Elliott's riff becoming the song's chorus.

Thus, Lange and Elliott quickly put together a sketch of the song on tape with drum machine, bass, guitar and scratch vocals – even then, they felt they were "onto a bit of a winner". Once the rest of the band were involved, the song was completed within two weeks, smoothed out, and included as the fifth track on Hysteria.

Elliott claims the song was at least partially inspired by the Aerosmith and Run-DMC version of "Walk This Way", which made him realize the potential of the mixing of rap and rock.

The song's lyrics were written after Elliott and Lange went to opposite ends of the studio control room and delivered stream-of-consciousness words into a pair of dictaphones while the song's backing track played. They then swapped dictaphones and tried to determine what each other's words were. In the Hysteria episode of the Classic Albums documentary series, Elliott said he thought he heard the phrase "love is like a bomb" on Lange's tape "and that set the whole tone for the lyric." (However, some of the key lyrics as well as the overall theme of the song are similar to those of the song "Sugar, Sugar" by the Archies.)

Two intros were recorded for the song: the album version has "Step inside, walk this way, you and me babe, hey hey!" and then cuts immediately to the main guitar riff, while the extended version has "love is like a bomb" and a slightly longer progression. The extended intro was later edited into the single version.

By the spring of 1988, Hysteria had sold 3 million copies, which was not enough to cover the album's $5 million production costs. Thus, the band edited footage from an upcoming concert film to make a new promo clip for "Pour Some Sugar on Me" and finally released it as the fourth single in North America.

== Reception ==
The somewhat delayed success of "Pour Some Sugar on Me" (due to the new promo release) helped send Hysteria to number 1 on the Top Pop Albums chart (now the Billboard 200) a year after release, selling four million copies during the single's run. The song reached number 2 on the US Billboard Hot 100, number 18 on the UK Singles Chart and number 26 on the Australian Singles Chart.

MTV ranked "Pour Some Sugar on Me" number 1 on its "Top 300 Videos of All Time" countdown in May 1991. In 2006, VH1 ranked the song number 2 on its list of the "100 Greatest Songs of the '80s." AllMusic wrote: "The romp of a song is mindless fun and remains one of the genre's most headbanging, fist-banging greatest."

In 2012, due to royalty conflicts with their record company regarding profits from online sales, the band re-recorded the song, along with "Rock of Ages", under the title "Pour Some Sugar on Me 2012" and released both digitally in June 2012 (similarly, a re-recorded version of the single "Hysteria" entitled "Hysteria (2013 Re-recorded Version)" was also released online the following year).

The song is a mainstay of classic rock and classic hits stations. In the 2010s, it was added to some adult contemporary stations despite never hitting that chart. (Note: Their song "Two Steps Behind" in 1992, however, did hit the AC chart.)

== Music video ==
Two different music videos for the song were produced. The first version (directed by Russell Mulcahy) shows the band playing inside a derelict Irish stately home (Mount Merrion House at Stillorgan, Dublin) while it is being demolished by a wrecking ball and a burly, sledgehammer-wielding, female construction worker played by Rosemary Henderson, who at the time was appearing on Saturday morning children's television in Ireland.

Filmed before the song became a hit in the United States, a second video simply of the band playing the song live was released for American MTV. The American video (directed by Wayne Isham) was edited from the band's full-length 1989 video release, Live: In the Round, in Your Face, recorded at McNichols Sports Arena in Denver, Colorado in February 1988. The music video for the song had an extended, distortion-laden intro in lieu of the album version's "Step inside, walk this way" intro. Most compilations use the extended music video-style intro.

== Track listings ==
7": Bludgeon Riffola / Mercury / 870 298-7 (US)

1. "Pour Some Sugar on Me"
2. "Ring of Fire"

US 12"

1. "Pour Some Sugar on Me" (extended version)
2. "Pour Some Sugar on Me" (album version)
3. "I Wanna Be Your Hero"

CD single: Bludgeon Riffola / Mercury / 8724872 (Germany)

1. "Pour Some Sugar on Me" (extended version)
2. "Release Me"
3. "Rock of Ages" (live medley)

== Personnel ==
- Joe Elliott – lead vocals
- Phil Collen – rhythm guitar, backing vocals
- Steve Clark – lead guitar, backing vocals
- Rick Savage – bass, backing vocals
- Rick Allen – drums

== Charts ==
This song is notable for being the only Def Leppard song to get significant airplay on adult contemporary stations despite not registering at all on the AC charts while "Two Steps Behind" did, reaching No. 29.

=== Weekly charts ===
Chart (1987–1989)	Peak position
Australia (ARIA)	26
Canada Top Singles (RPM)	22
Canada 30 Retail Singles (RPM)	16
Ireland (IRMA)	8
Netherlands (Single Top 100)	94
New Zealand (Recorded Music NZ)	16
UK Singles (Official Charts)	18
US Billboard Hot 100	2
US Mainstream Rock (Billboard)	25
West Germany (GfK)	50

Chart (2019)	Peak position
US Hot Rock & Alternative Songs (Billboard)	10

=== Year-end charts ===
Chart (1988)	Position
US Billboard Hot 100	19

== Certifications ==
Region	Certification	Certified units/sales
New Zealand (RMNZ)	3× Platinum	90,000^{‡}
United Kingdom (BPI)	Platinum	600,000^{‡}
United States (RIAA)	Gold	500,000^{*}
^{*} Sales figures based on certification alone.^{‡} Sales+streaming figures based on certification alone.

== See also ==
- List of glam metal albums and songs
