= Rock of Ages (Def Leppard song) =

1983 single by Def Leppard

Single by Def Leppard

from the album Pyromania
- B-side: "Action! Not Words" (UK); "Billy's Got a Gun" (US)
- Released: June 1983
- Recorded: 1982
- Studio: Park Gates (Battle, East Sussex); Battery (London)
- Genre: Hard rock; glam metal
- Length: 4:09
- Label: Mercury (US); Vertigo (UK)
- Songwriters: Joe Elliott; Steve Clark; Robert John "Mutt" Lange
- Producer: Robert John "Mutt" Lange

Def Leppard singles chronology
"Photograph" (1983)	"Rock of Ages" (1983)	"Foolin'" (1983)

Music videos
- "Rock of Ages" on YouTube

"Rock of Ages" is a song by Def Leppard from their 1983 album Pyromania. When issued as a single in the United States, the song reached #16 on the Billboard Hot 100 chart and #19 on the Cash Box Top 100. It also hit #1 on the Top Tracks Rock chart.

In 2012, the band re-recorded the song, along with "Pour Some Sugar on Me", under the title "Rock of Ages 2012". Both were released digitally on 4 June 2012.

In 2015, "Sleazegrinder" of Louder included the song in his list of "The 20 Greatest Hair Metal Anthems Of All Time", placing it at the top.

== Lyrics ==
The song begins with "Günter glieben glauten globen", a German-like nonsense phrase introduced by Mutt Lange, who is of German descent. According to the official Def Leppard FAQ,

What does "Günter Glieben Glauten Globen" mean? Nothing in particular (although the band sometimes jokingly claims it means "running through the forest silently"). It's gibberish said by producer Mutt Lange during the recordings of "Rock of Ages", instead of the regular one, two, three, four.

That same count-in was sampled by the Offspring at the beginning of their 1998 song "Pretty Fly (For a White Guy)".

As the song's melody begins, Elliott speaks the lines, "All right/I've got something to say/It's better to burn out/Than to fade away"; the second two lines are a reference to Neil Young's song "My My, Hey Hey (Out of the Blue)". Def Leppard's four-line version was quoted in the 1986 movie Highlander by the film's villain, The Kurgan. Young's line would later gain further attention when it was used in the suicide note of Kurt Cobain.

During the guitar solo, several vocal phrases were backmasked. When played forward, the phrases "Fuck the Russians" and "Brezhnev's got herpes" can be heard.

== Title ==
According to the liner notes of the compilation release Rock of Ages: The Definitive Collection, the band was at a recording studio when lead vocalist Joe Elliott stumbled upon a hymn book left by a member of a children's choir that had just used the studio. In the book, he saw the words "Rock of Ages", which prompted him to write the lyrics of the song.

== Reception ==
Cash Box described it as a powerful rock anthem that "pulls out just about every 'Long live rock ‘n’ roll' cliché there is." AllMusic called it "the blueprint for almost all of Lep's future hits."

== Music video ==
The music video was directed by David Mallet and shot on 8 December 1982 (guitarist Phil Collen's 25th birthday), in Battersea, London, England. Former Def Leppard co-manager Peter Mensch appears in this video as one of the monks.

The song's video was placed on New York Times list of the 15 Essential Hair-Metal Videos.

== Track listings ==
7": Vertigo / VER6 (812 858-7) (UK)

1. "Rock of Ages"
2. "Action! Not Words"

12": Vertigo / VERX6 (812 293-1) (UK)

1. "Rock of Ages"
2. "Action! Not Words"

7": Mercury / 812 604-7 (US)

1. "Rock of Ages"
2. "Billy's Got a Gun"

== Personnel ==
=== Def Leppard ===
- Joe Elliott – lead vocals
- Phil Collen – guitar solo, additional rhythm guitar, backing vocals
- Steve Clark – lead guitar, backing vocals
- Pete Willis – rhythm guitar
- Vivian Campbell – rhythm guitar, backing vocals (2012 re-recording)
- Rick Savage – bass guitar, Moog bass synthesizer, backing vocals
- Rick Allen – drums

=== Additional musicians ===
- Robert John "Mutt" Lange – spoken word intro, backing vocals
- Thomas Dolby – keyboards
- Rocky Newton – backing vocals

== Charts ==
Chart (1983)	Peak position
Australian Singles (Kent Music Report)	96
Canada Top Singles (RPM)	24
UK Singles (Official Charts)	41
US Billboard Hot 100	16
US Mainstream Rock (Billboard)	1

== See also ==
- List of number-one mainstream rock hits (United States)
- List of glam metal albums and songs
