= Photograph (Def Leppard song) =

Single by Def Leppard

from the album Pyromania
- B-side: "Action! Not Words"
- Released: January 1983 (UK)
- Recorded: 1982
- Studio: Park Gates (Battle, East Sussex); Battery (London)
- Genre: Pop metal; glam metal; hard rock; power pop
- Length: 4:12; 3:55 (single edit)
- Label: Vertigo; Mercury
- Songwriters: Steve Clark; Pete Willis; Rick Savage; Joe Elliott; Robert John "Mutt" Lange
- Producer: Robert John "Mutt" Lange

Def Leppard singles chronology
"Bringin' On the Heartbreak" (1981)	"Photograph" (1983)	"Rock of Ages" (1983)

UK cover

Music video
- "Photograph" on YouTube

"Photograph" is a song by the English hard rock band Def Leppard that was produced by Robert John "Mutt" Lange. The track was the lead single from the band's third studio album, 1983's Pyromania. Although it has frequently been described as being a tribute to the entertainer Marilyn Monroe, the group's lead vocalist, Joe Elliott, has described the song as broadly about "something you can't ever get your hands on."

The song reached No. 1 on the Billboard Top Tracks chart, where it stayed for six weeks. It additionally reached No. 12 on the Pop Singles chart.

In 2008, they performed the song with Taylor Swift on CMT Crossroads. The performance was nominated for both Wide Open Country Video of the Year and CMT Performance of the Year at the 2009 CMT Music Awards.

In 2013, the song was featured in the Grand Theft Auto V video game, on the Los Santos Rock Radio station. It was also released as downloadable content for Rock Band 3 in 2011.

== Musical style ==
The song has been described as pop metal, glam metal, hard rock and power pop.

== Reception ==
Cash Box called it "a well-crafted if typical hard-pop outing," praising the "incendiary metal guitar licks and deafening drumbeats." AllMusic called it "a truly inescapable, infectious rock anthem" and said it "[...] defined the pop-metal craze that would dominate the rock scene for the entire decade."

== Music video ==
There are several appearances of a lookalike impersonating Marilyn Monroe in the video. Mutt Lange would later go on to say that the song wasn't about anyone in particular but more about expressing "young lust in an anthemic song."

The music video was directed by David Mallet and was shot on 2 December 1982 (bassist Rick Savage's 22nd birthday), in Battersea, London, England. It featured the video debut of their co-lead guitarist Phil Collen. The video aired in heavy rotation on MTV.

== Legacy ==
"Photograph" is widely considered one of Def Leppard's best songs. In 2009 it was named the 13th-greatest hard rock song of all time by VH1. It was also listed as the 17th-greatest song of the past 25 years by VH1. In 2015, Loudwire ranked the song number one on their list of the 10 greatest Def Leppard songs, and in 2017, Billboard placed it number two on their list of the 15 best Def Leppard songs.

== Personnel ==
=== Def Leppard ===
- Joe Elliott – lead vocals
- Steve Clark – lead guitar, backing vocals
- Pete Willis – rhythm guitar
- Phil Collen – guitar solo, additional rhythm guitar, backing vocals
- Rick Savage – bass guitar, backing vocals
- Rick Allen – drums, backing vocals

=== Additional personnel ===
- Thomas Dolby – keyboards

== Charts ==
=== Weekly charts ===
Chart (1983)	Peak position
Canada Top Singles (RPM)	32
UK Singles (Official Charts)	66
US Billboard Hot 100	12
US Mainstream Rock (Billboard)	1

=== Year-end charts ===
Chart (1983)	Position
US Billboard Hot 100	90

Santana featuring Chris Daughtry
Chart (2011–2012)	Position
US Mainstream Rock (Billboard)	30

Chart (2019)	Position
US Hot Rock & Alternative Songs (Billboard)	23

== See also ==
- List of number-one mainstream rock hits during the 1980s (United States)
- List of glam metal albums and songs
