= Rick Allen (drummer) =

English drummer (born 1963)

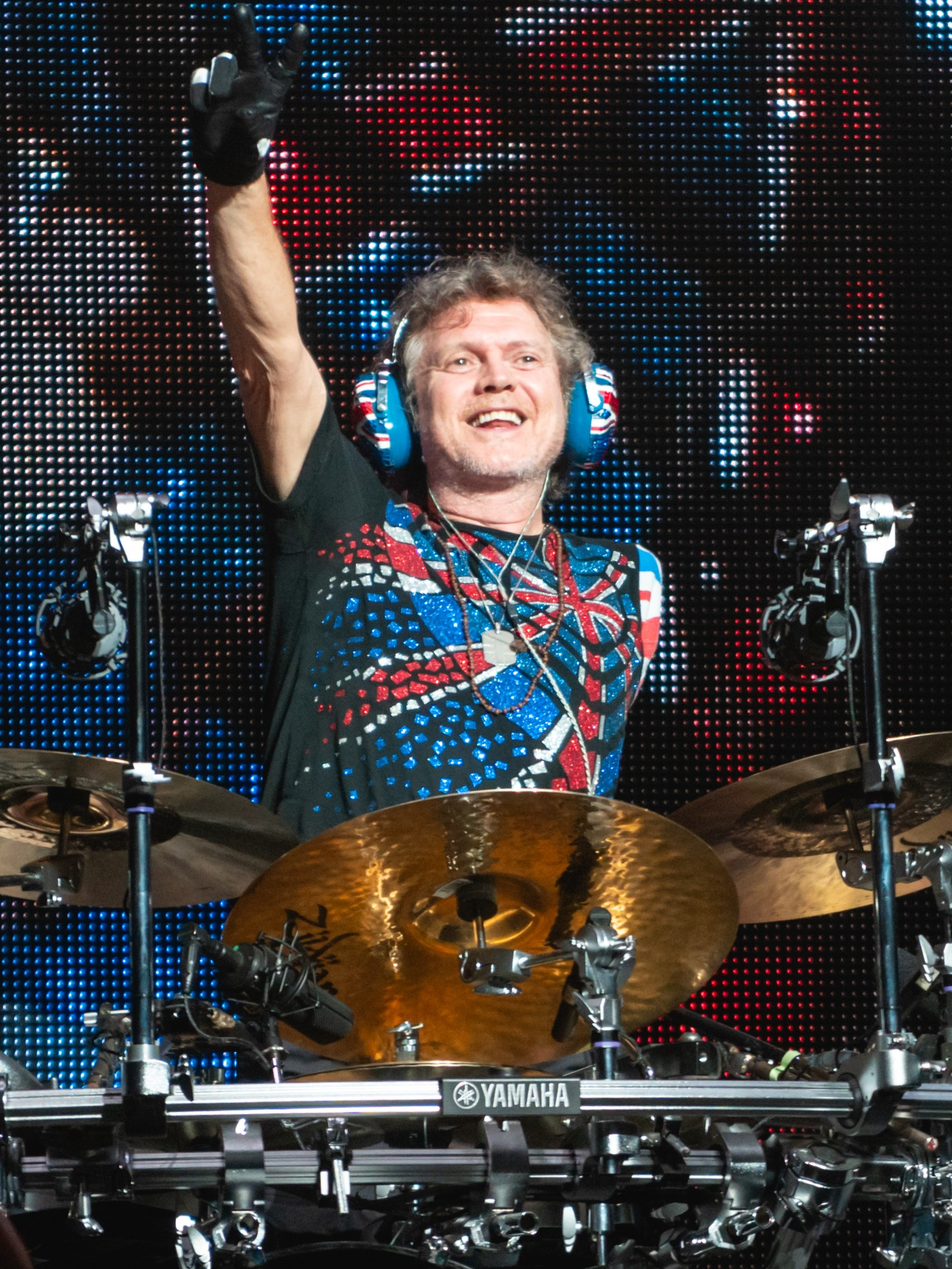
- Allen performing in 2018

Background information
- Also known as: The Thunder God
- Born: Richard John Cyril Allen; 1 November 1963 (age 63); Dronfield, Derbyshire, England
- Genres: Heavy metal; hard rock; glam metal; arena rock; pop rock
- Occupations: Musician; songwriter; activist
- Instrument: Drums
- Years active: 1978–present
- Member of: Def Leppard
- Spouse: Stacy Lauren Gilbert (m. 1991; div. 2000) Lauren Cuggino Monroe (m. 2003)
- Website: rickallen.com

Richard John Cyril Allen (born 1 November 1963) is an English musician who has been the drummer of the hard rock band Def Leppard since 1978. He overcame the amputation of his left arm in 1985 and continued to play with the band, which went on to its most commercially successful phase. Known as "The Thunder God" by fans, he is ranked No. 7 on Gigwise in The Greatest Drummers of All Time list.

== Early life ==
Allen was born on 1 November 1963 in Dronfield, Derbyshire to Kathleen Moore and Geoffrey Allen, and started playing drums at the age of nine. He performed in the bands Grad, Smokey Blue, Rampant, and the Johnny Kalendar Band. When he was 14, his mother replied on his behalf to an advertisement placed by a band called Def Leppard looking for a drummer to replace Tony Kenning ("Leppard loses skins" was the advertisement's headline). He later joined the band on 1 November 1978, which was his 15th birthday. In 1979, he dropped out of school to concentrate on a career in music. He celebrated his 16th birthday with a performance at the Hammersmith Odeon, when Def Leppard opened for AC/DC.

== Car crash and recovery ==
"What I've experienced through losing my arm, I wouldn't change. The human spirit is so strong."

— Rick Allen

On the afternoon of 31 December 1984, Allen was involved in a car crash with his then girlfriend, Miriam Barendsen, on the A57 road in the countryside a few miles west of Sheffield. A car in front of theirs deliberately slowed for him to catch up, only to speed up as he tried to pass. This went on for several miles until, in frustration, he accelerated to pass, at which point he lost control of the left-hand-drive Corvette C4, which hit a dry stone wall and entered a field. His left arm was entangled in the seat belt and severed, remaining in the car while he was flung out. Doctors initially re-attached it, but it was later amputated due to an infection.

Initially, Allen felt "defeated," but, buoyed by "family, friends and hundreds of thousands of letters from all over the planet," he decided to continue playing drums with Def Leppard, and he adopted a specially designed electronic drum kit. The band took a hiatus from onstage performances until 5 August 1986 (Allen's first live performance since losing his arm), instead doing a small run of public rehearsal shows in Ireland in advance of their 16 August 1986 Monsters of Rock festival performance at Castle Donington. He has since re-adopted partially acoustic drum kits depending on the setting.

== Equipment ==
Allen has used custom-manufactured cable routing by Whirlwind. He uses four electronic pedals for his left foot to play the pieces he used to play with his left arm, which from left to right trigger sounds of a closing hi-hat, bass drum, snare drum, and a tom drum.

In 2009, Yamaha announced the addition of Allen to their artist roster. He plays Yamaha Oak Custom drums with a matching subkick. He also uses Remo drumheads (usually he has coated Ambassadors on his drums and a clear Powerstroke 3 on his bass drum), Zildjian cymbals (mostly K customs, Z Customs and A customs), an Ahead drumstick and an LP rock cowbell. He previously used Ludwig Drums, Paiste 2002, RUDE, and Sound Creation cymbals.

== Charitable works ==
Allen and his wife Lauren Monroe are the co-founders of the Raven Drum Foundation, a charity. Allen also formed the One Hand Drum Company to provide funding for the Raven Drum Foundation. The company primarily sells merchandise featuring "Stik Rick", an illustrated character representing Allen.

== Personal life ==
Allen was married to Stacy Lauren Gilbert from 1991 to 2000. In 1995, he was arrested for spousal abuse and was sentenced to a work crew and ordered to attend Alcoholics Anonymous meetings. He is married to Lauren Cuggino Monroe, who is also a musician and he has contributed to some of her albums. He is a vegan.

On the weekend of 12 March 2023, while standing in the parking valet area of the Four Seasons Hotel in Fort Lauderdale, Florida, where he was staying for a performance at the Seminole Hard Rock Hotel & Casino Hollywood, Allen was attacked by a "spring-breaker" who intentionally ran toward and collided with him, knocking him to the ground. He sustained a head injury. The attacker was apprehended and charged with several crimes.
