= Warrant discography =

- Studio albums: 9
- Live albums: 3
- Compilation albums: 4
- Singles: 33
- Video albums: 4
- Music videos: 32

The following is a comprehensive discography of Warrant, an American glam metal band from Los Angeles, California, that experienced its biggest success in the late 1980s/early 1990s. The band has released a total of nine studio albums with international sales of albums and singles combined at approximately 10 million. The band first came into the national spotlight with their double platinum debut album Dirty Rotten Filthy Stinking Rich, and one of its singles, "Heaven," reached #2 on the US Billboard Hot 100. The band continued its success in the early 1990s with the double platinum album Cherry Pie which provided the hit album titled song.

Their success began to wane somewhat after that, but they did release the gold album Dog Eat Dog. The band started to experience frequent changes to the line-up and despite the drop in popularity, they released Ultraphobic in 1995 and a greatest hits album in 1996. The band also changed their musical direction with the release of the grunge infested Belly to Belly in 1996, but returned to their roots when the album didn't reach sales expectations. Warrant went on tour in 2000s, released a new covers album Under the Influence, and saw lead singer Jani Lane leaving the band. An album entitled Born Again was released with new singer Jaime St. James, and there was a brief reunion of the original line up. Into the new decade former lead singer and main songwriter Jani Lane died. After more than 30 years, the band is still recording music and performing, now with ex-Lynch Mob vocalist, Robert Mason.

Since their debut in 1989, they have released nine studio albums, one live album, four compilation albums, and have had thirty three singles released.

== Albums ==
=== Studio albums ===
Title	Album details	Peak chart positions									Certifications
Title	Album details	US	US Hard Rock	US Indie	AUS	CAN	JPN	SWI	UK	UK Rock	Certifications
Dirty Rotten Filthy Stinking Rich	Released: January 31, 1989; Label: Columbia	10	—	—	72	20	—	—	—	—	CAN: Platinum; US: 2 X Platinum
Cherry Pie	Released: September 11, 1990; Label: Columbia	7	—	—	13	34	26	—	—	—	AUS: Platinum; CAN: Platinum; US: 2× Platinum
Dog Eat Dog	Released: August 25, 1992; Label: Columbia	25	—	—	105	—	26	—	72	—	US: Gold
Ultraphobic	Released: March 7, 1995; Label: CMC	—	—	—	—	—	—	—	—	10	
Belly to Belly	Released: October 1, 1996; Label: CMC	—	—	—	—	—	—	—	—	—	
Under the Influence	Released: June 12, 2001; Label: Perris	—	—	—	—	—	—	—	—	—	
Born Again	Released: June 27, 2006; Label: Cleopatra	—	—	—	—	—	—	—	—	—	
Rockaholic	Released: May 17, 2011; Label: Frontiers	—	22	—	—	—	—	—	—	—	
Louder Harder Faster	Released: May 12, 2017; Label: Frontiers	—	—	19	—	—	—	98	—	35	
"—" denotes releases that did not chart or were not released in that territory.

=== Live albums ===
Year	Title
1997	Warrant Live 86-97: Release: July 29, 1997; Label: CMC; Format: CD
2005	Warrant Live Extended Versions: Release: 2005; Label: BMG; Format: CD
2014	Warrant 10 Live!: Release: 2014; Label: BMG; Format: CD

=== Compilation albums ===
Year	Title
1996	The Best of Warrant: Release: April 2, 1996; Label: Sony; Format: CD
1996	Rocking Tall: Release: May 13, 1996; Label: Format: CD
1999	Greatest & Latest: Release: 1999; Label: Deadline; Format: CD
2004	Then and Now: Release: May 4, 2004; Label: Sanctuary; Format: CD

== Singles ==
Year	Single	Peak chart positions							Album
Year	Single	US	US Rock	AUS	CAN	NOR	NZ	UK	Album
1989	"Down Boys"	27	13	151	–	–	50	–	Dirty Rotten Filthy Stinking Rich
1989	"Heaven"	2	3	54	5	4	–	93	Dirty Rotten Filthy Stinking Rich
1989	"Big Talk"	93	30	111	–	–	–	–	Dirty Rotten Filthy Stinking Rich
1990	"Sometimes She Cries"	20	11	161	27	–	–	–	Dirty Rotten Filthy Stinking Rich
1990	"Cherry Pie"	10	19	6	57	–	37	35	Cherry Pie
1991	"I Saw Red"	10	14	36	17	–	–	–	Cherry Pie
1991	"Uncle Tom's Cabin"	78	19	85	–	–	–	–	Cherry Pie
1991	"Blind Faith"	88	39	–	–	–	–	–	Cherry Pie
1992	"We Will Rock You"	83	–	50	–	–	–	–	Gladiator (1992 soundtrack) and later on The Best of Warrant
1992	"Machine Gun"	–	36	124	–	–	–	–	Dog Eat Dog
1992	"The Bitter Pill"	–	–	220	–	–	–	–	Dog Eat Dog
1992	"The Hole In My Wall"	–	–	–	–	–	–	–	Dog Eat Dog
1993	"Inside Out"	–	–	–	–	–	–	–	Dog Eat Dog
1993	"Andy Warhol (promo)"	–	–	–	–	–	–	–	Dog Eat Dog
1995	"Family Picnic"	–	–	–	–	–	–	–	Ultraphobic
1995	"Stronger Now"	–	–	–	–	–	–	–	Ultraphobic
1995	"Followed"	–	–	–	–	–	–	–	Ultraphobic
1996	"I Saw Red (Acoustic)"	–	–	–	–	–	–	–	The Best of Warrant
1996	"AYM"	–	–	–	–	–	–	–	Belly to Belly
1996	"Feels Good"	–	–	–	–	–	–	–	Belly to Belly
1997	"Indian Giver"	–	–	–	–	–	–	–	Belly to Belly
1999	"Southern Comfort"	–	–	–	–	–	–	–	Greatest & Latest
1999	"Heaven '99"	–	–	–	–	–	–	–	Greatest & Latest
1999	"Cherry Pie '99"	–	–	–	–	–	–	–	Greatest & Latest
2001	"Face"	–	–	–	–	–	–	–	Under the Influence
2006	"Bourbon County Line"	–	–	–	–	–	–	–	Born Again
2006	"Dirty Jack"	–	–	–	–	–	–	–	Born Again
2011	"Life's a Song"	–	–	–	–	–	–	–	Rockaholic
2011	"Home"	–	–	–	–	–	–	–	Rockaholic
2017	"I Think I'll Just Stay Here and Drink"	–	–	–	–	–	–	–	Louder Harder Faster
2017	"Only Broken Heart"	–	–	–	–	–	–	–	Louder Harder Faster
2017	"Devil Dancer"	–	–	–	–	–	–	–	Louder Harder Faster
2017	"Perfect"	–	–	–	–	–	–	–	Louder Harder Faster
2017	"Louder Harder Faster"	–	–	–	–	–	–	–	Louder Harder Faster

=== Soundtrack appearances ===
Title	Release	Soundtrack
"Game of War"	1989	Bill & Ted's Excellent Adventure
"We Will Rock You"	1992	Gladiator
"The Power"	1992	Gladiator

== Video albums ==
Year	Title	Certifications
1990	Warrant: Live - Dirty Rotten Filthy Stinking Rich: Released: 1990; Label: Columbia Music Video, Image Entertainment; Formats: VHS, Laserdisc	US Platinum
1991	Cherry Pie: Quality You Can Taste: Released: 1991; Label: Columbia Music Video, Pioneer Japan; Formats: VHS, Laserdisc	
2006	Born Again: Delvis Video Diaries: Released: 2006; Label: Formats: DVD	
2008	They Came from Hollywood: Released: 2008; Label: Formats: DVD	

=== Music videos ===
Year	Title
1989	"Down Boys"
1989	"Heaven"
1989	"Big Talk"
1990	"Sometimes She Cries"
1990	"Cherry Pie"
1991	"I Saw Red"
1991	"I Saw Red (Acoustic)"
1991	"Uncle Tom's Cabin"
1991	"Blind Faith"
1992	"Machine Gun"
1992	"The Bitter Pill"
1992	"We Will Rock You"
1995	"Family Picnic"
1995	"Stronger Now"
1996	"The Bitter Pill (Acoustic)"
1996	"A.Y.M."
2006	"Bourbon County Line"
2006	"Dirty Jack"
2006	"Devil's Juice"
2006	"Hell, CA"
2006	"Angels"
2006	"Love Strikes Like Lightning"
2006	"Glimmer"
2006	"Roller Coaster"
2006	"Down In Diamonds"
2006	"Velvet Noose"
2006	"Roxy"
2006	"Good Times"
2011	"Lifes a Song"
2011	"Home"
2017	"I Think I'll Just Stay Here and Drink"
2017	"Louder Harder Faster"

- Music videos were made for all the songs from the album Born Again in 2006 but only "Bourbon County Line" and "Dirty Jack" were released as singles.
