= List of Warrant members =

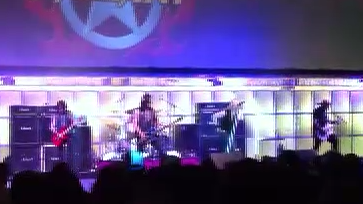
Warrant in 2012

Warrant is an American glam metal band from Hollywood, California. The group was formed in summer 1984 by lead vocalist Adam Shore and drummer Max Asher (real name Max Mazursky). Also in the original line-up included were lead guitarist Josh Lewis, rhythm guitarist Erik Turner, and bassist Chris Vincent. Vincent was replaced after only three months by Jerry Dixon.

Shore and Asher left in September 1986, with Turner bringing in Jani Lane and Steven Sweet from the group Plain Jane as their replacements. The following March, Joey Allen replaced Lewis.

Warrant released its debut album Dirty Rotten Filthy Stinking Rich in 1989, which was followed by Cherry Pie the following year and Dog Eat Dog in 1992. Lane briefly left Warrant in March 1993 to start a solo career, but within 18 months had returned to the band.

Prior to Lane's return, Allen also left in May 1994, followed by Sweet the following month; later in the year, they were replaced by Kingdom Come's Rick Steier and James Kottak, respectively. Kottak only remained for two years, with Bobby Borg taking his place after the release and touring of Ultraphobic. Borg left in 1997 and was replaced on tour by Vik Foxx and later Danny Wagner, the latter of whom had previously played keyboards for the group. Steier and Wagner both subsequently left the band in early 2000. Replacing Steier with Billy Morris and Wagner with Mike Fasano, Warrant released Under the Influence, an album of cover versions, in 2001. On April 2, 2003, Fasano was fired from the band by Lane, with Kevin Phares of the vocalist's solo band taking his place.

Lane left Warrant for a second time in January 2004 to focus on his solo career, with the group announcing the return of Allen, Fasano and the addition of new frontman Jaime St. James the following month. By March, Fasano had been replaced by the returning Sweet, marking a reunion of the band's classic lineup with the exception of Lane. Born Again, the first Warrant album without Lane, was released in 2006. In early 2008, Lane returned to front Warrant for a third time. The reunion lasted less than a year, however, as Lane left for a final time in September and was replaced by former Lynch Mob frontman Robert Mason. Lane later died on August 11, 2011, of acute alcohol poisoning.

== Members ==
=== Current ===
Image	Name	Years active	Instruments	Release contributions
	Erik Turner	1984–present	rhythm guitar; lead guitar (1995); backing vocals; acoustic guitar; harmonica	all Warrant releases
	Jerry Dixon	1984–present	bass guitar; backing vocals	all Warrant releases
	Steven Sweet	1986–1994; 2004–present	drums; backing vocals	all Warrant releases from Dirty Rotten Filthy Stinking Rich (1989) to Dog Eat Dog (1992), and from Born Again (2006) onwards
	Joey Allen	1987–1994; 2004–present	lead guitar; banjo; backing vocals	all Warrant releases from Dirty Rotten Filthy Stinking Rich (1989) to Dog Eat Dog (1992), and from Born Again (2006) onwards
	Robert Mason	2008–present	lead vocals; rhythm and acoustic guitar	Rockaholic (2011); Louder Harder Faster (2017)

=== Former ===
Image	Name	Years active	Instruments	Release contributions
	Josh Lewis	1984–1987	lead guitar; backing vocals	none
	Adam Shore	1984–1986	lead vocals; bass guitar (1984)	none
	Max Asher (real name Max Mazursky)	1984–1986	drums	none
	Alan Fischer	1984	bass guitar	none
	Chris Vincent	1984	bass guitar	
	Jani Lane (real name John Oswald)	1986–1993; 1994–2004; 2008 (died 2011)	lead vocals; occasional acoustic guitar; keyboards; piano; drums; percussion	all Warrant releases from Dirty Rotten Filthy Stinking Rich (1989) to Under the Influence (2001)
	Rick Steier	1994–2000	lead guitar; backing vocals	all Warrant releases from Ultraphobic (1995) to Greatest & Latest (1999)
	James Kottak	1994–1996 (died 2024)	drums; backing vocals	Ultraphobic (1995)
	Bobby Borg	1996–1997	drums	Belly to Belly (1996); Warrant Live 86–97 (1997); Greatest & Latest (1999)
	Mike Fasano	2000–2003; 2004	drums	Under the Influence (2001)
	Billy Morris	2000–2004	lead guitar; backing vocals	Under the Influence (2001)
	Mike Morris	2000–2004	keyboards	Under the Influence (2001)
	Kevin Phares	2003–2004	drums	none
	Jaime St. James (real name James Pond)	2004–2008	lead vocals	Born Again (2006)

=== Touring ===
Image	Name	Years active	Instruments	Release contributions
	Scott Warren	1989–1992	keyboards; backing vocals	Cherry Pie (1990); Dog Eat Dog (1992)
	Dave White	1992–1995	keyboards; backing vocals	Ultraphobic (1995)
	Vik "Vikki" Foxx	1997–1998	drums	none
	Terry Ingram	1991–1992	keyboards	none
	Danny Wagner	1995–2000	keyboards (1995–1998); drums (1998–2000); backing vocals	Warrant Live 86–97 (1997); Greatest & Latest (1999)
	Mike Morris	2000–2004	keyboards	none
	Keri Kelli	2000	lead guitar	none
	Shawn Zavodney	2001–2004	keyboards; backing vocals	none
	Dan Conway	2006	drums	none
	Michael Foster	2012–2013	drums	none
	Kevin Baldes	2019	bass guitar	none
	Robbie Crane	2019, 2021–present	bass guitar	none
	Unknown drummer	fall 2023	drums; percussion	none
	James Kloeppel	2023–present	keyboards; backing vocals; guitar (touring substitute 2024–2025); lead guitar (touring substitute 2025)	none

== Lineups ==
Period	Members	Releases
Spring — September 1984	Adam Shore – lead vocals; Josh Lewis – lead guitar, backing vocals; Erik Turner – rhythm guitar, backing vocals; Chris Vincent – bass guitar; Max Asher – drums	none
October 1984 – September 1986	Adam Shore – lead vocals; Josh Lewis – lead guitar, backing vocals; Erik Turner – rhythm guitar, backing vocals; Jerry Dixon – bass guitar, backing vocals; Max Asher – drums	none
September 1986 – March 1987	Jani Lane – lead vocals; Josh Lewis – lead guitar, backing vocals; Erik Turner – rhythm guitar, backing vocals; Jerry Dixon – bass guitar, backing vocals; Steven Sweet – drums, backing vocals	none
March 1987 – March 1993	Jani Lane – lead vocals, occasional acoustic guitar (until 1990); Joey Allen – lead guitar, backing vocals; Erik Turner – rhythm guitar, backing vocals; Jerry Dixon – bass guitar, backing vocals; Steven Sweet – drums, backing vocals	Dirty Rotten Filthy Stinking Rich (1989); Cherry Pie (1990); Dog Eat Dog (1992)
March 1993 – May 1994	Joey Allen – lead guitar; Erik Turner – rhythm guitar; Jerry Dixon – bass guitar; Steven Sweet – drums	none
May – June 1994	Erik Turner – guitar; Jerry Dixon – bass guitar; Steven Sweet – drums	none
June – September 1994	Erik Turner – guitar; Jerry Dixon – bass guitar	none
Autumn 1994	Jani Lane – lead vocals; Erik Turner – guitar, backing vocals; Jerry Dixon – bass guitar, backing vocals	none
November 1994 – March 1996	Jani Lane – lead vocals, occasional acoustic guitar; Rick Steier – lead guitar, backing vocals; Erik Turner – rhythm guitar, backing vocals; Jerry Dixon – bass guitar, backing vocals; James Kottak – drums, backing vocals	Ultraphobic (1995)
March 1996 – October 1997	Jani Lane – lead vocals, occasional acoustic guitar; Rick Steier – lead guitar, backing vocals; Erik Turner – rhythm guitar, backing vocals; Jerry Dixon – bass guitar, backing vocals; Bobby Borg – drums	Belly to Belly (1996); Warrant Live 86–97 (1997); Greatest & Latest (1999) – three tracks only
1997–1998	Jani Lane – lead vocals, occasional acoustic guitar; Rick Steier – lead guitar, backing vocals; Erik Turner – rhythm guitar, backing vocals; Jerry Dixon – bass guitar, backing vocals; Vikki Foxx – drums (temporary)	none (remaining tracks on Greatest & Latest recorded during 1998/1999 with Lane on drums)
1998–2000	Jani Lane – lead vocals, occasional acoustic guitar; Rick Steier – lead guitar, backing vocals; Erik Turner – rhythm guitar, backing vocals; Jerry Dixon – bass guitar, backing vocals; Danny Wagner – drums (temporary)	none (remaining tracks on Greatest & Latest recorded during 1998/1999 with Lane on drums)
January – August 2000	Jani Lane – lead vocals, occasional acoustic guitar; Keri Kelli – lead guitar (temporary); Erik Turner – rhythm guitar, backing vocals; Jerry Dixon – bass guitar, backing vocals; Mike Fasano – drums	none (remaining tracks on Greatest & Latest recorded during 1998/1999 with Lane on drums)
September 2000 – April 2003	Jani Lane – lead vocals, occasional acoustic guitar; Billy Morris – lead guitar, backing vocals; Erik Turner – rhythm guitar, backing vocals; Jerry Dixon – bass guitar, backing vocals; Mike Fasano – drums; Shawn Zavodney - Keyboards, backing vocals	Under the Influence (2001)
April 2003 – January 2004	Jani Lane – lead vocals, occasional acoustic guitar; Billy Morris – lead guitar, backing vocals; Erik Turner – rhythm guitar, backing vocals; Jerry Dixon – bass guitar, backing vocals; Kevin Phares – drums; Shawn Zavodney - Keyboards, backing vocals	none
February – March 2004	Jaime St. James – lead vocals; Joey Allen – lead guitar, backing vocals; Erik Turner – rhythm guitar, backing vocals; Jerry Dixon – bass guitar, backing vocals; Mike Fasano – drums	none
March 2004 – January 2008	Jaime St. James – lead vocals; Joey Allen – lead guitar, backing vocals; Erik Turner – rhythm guitar, backing vocals; Jerry Dixon – bass guitar, backing vocals; Steven Sweet – drums, backing vocals	Born Again (2006)
January – September 2008	Jani Lane – lead vocals, occasional acoustic guitar; Joey Allen – lead guitar, backing vocals; Erik Turner – rhythm guitar, backing vocals; Jerry Dixon – bass guitar, backing vocals; Steven Sweet – drums, backing vocals	none
September 2008 – present	Robert Mason – lead vocals, occasional acoustic guitar; Joey Allen – lead guitar, backing vocals; Erik Turner – rhythm guitar, backing vocals; Jerry Dixon – bass guitar, backing vocals; Steven Sweet – drums, backing vocals	Rockaholic (2011); Louder Harder Faster (2017)
