= The Best of Warrant =

Greatest hits album by Warrant
- Released: April 2, 1996
- Recorded: 1989–1992
- Genre: Glam metal; hard rock
- Length: 56:58
- Label: Sony
- Producer: Beau Hill, Michael Wagener, Al Quaglieri, Chris Parker, Erwin Musper

Warrant chronology
Ultraphobic (1995)	The Best of Warrant (1996)	Rocking Tall (1996)

Professional ratings
Review scores
Source	Rating
Allmusic	4/5 stars

The Best of Warrant is the first greatest hits compilation album by the American rock band Warrant, released in 1996. It features the band's greatest tracks (singles) from their first three studio albums, "Dirty Rotten Filthy Stinking Rich", "Cherry Pie" and "Dog Eat Dog". It does not contain any material from the band's 1995 album Ultraphobic.

== Track information ==
The album includes two bonus tracks: "Thin Disguise" which is a B-side from the Cherry Pie single (not included on any studio album) and "We Will Rock You" which is a cover of the Queen song of the same name and was released on the soundtrack to the 1992 film Gladiator starring Cuba Gooding Jr. The Warrant version of "We Will Rock You" charted at number 83 on The Billboard Hot 100. The version of I Saw Red is the acoustic version previously released as a B-side from the single of the same song. The acoustic version features a music video and was also released as a single in its own right.

== Track listing ==
No.	Title	Writer(s)	Original Album	Length
1.	"Down Boys"	Jani Lane; Erik Turner; Jerry Lawrence Dixon; Joseph Alan Cagle; Steven Chamberlin	Dirty Rotten Filthy Stinking Rich	4:05
2.	"32 Pennies in a Ragu Jar"	Lane; Turner: Dixon; Cagle; Chamberlin	Dirty Rotten Filthy Stinking Rich	3:10
3.	"Heaven"	Lane: Dixon; Cagle	Dirty Rotten Filthy Stinking Rich	3:56
4.	"D.R.F.S.R."	Lane; Turner: Dixon; Cagle; Chamberlin	Dirty Rotten Filthy Stinking Rich	3:18
5.	"Big Talk"	Lane: Turner: Dixon; Cagle	Dirty Rotten Filthy Stinking Rich	3:43
6.	"Sometimes She Cries"	Lane: Turner: Dixon; Cagle	Dirty Rotten Filthy Stinking Rich	4:44
7.	"Cherry Pie"	Lane: Turner: Dixon; Cagle	Cherry Pie	3:21
8.	"Thin Disguise"	Jani Lane; Adam Shore; Turner; Dixon; Cagle	B-Side of "Cherry Pie"	3:14
9.	"Uncle Tom's Cabin"	Lane: Turner: Dixon; Cagle	Cherry Pie	4:02
10.	"I Saw Red" (Acoustic version)	Lane: Turner: Dixon; Cagle	Cherry Pie	3:45
11.	"Bed of Roses"	Jani Lane; Randel Beau Hill; Turner; Cagle	Cherry Pie	3:14
12.	"Mr. Rainmaker"	Lane; Hill: Turner; Cagle	Cherry Pie	3:29
13.	"Sure Feels Good to Me"	Lane: Turner: Dixon; Cagle	Cherry Pie	2:40
14.	"Hole in My Wall"	Lane	Dog Eat Dog	3:36
15.	"Machine Gun"	Lane	Dog Eat Dog	3:44
16.	"We Will Rock You"	Brian May	Gladiator (Music From The Motion Picture Soundtrack)	2:56
Total length:				56:57
