= Then and Now (Warrant album) =

Compilation album by Warrant
- Released: 4 May 2004
- Recorded: Harpo's, Detroit, 22 November 1996 (live tracks)
- Genre: Hard rock
- Length: 47:57
- Label: Sanctuary
- Producer: Warrant, Beau Hill, Shay Baby

Warrant chronology
| Under the Influence (2001) | Then and Now (2004) | Born Again (2006) |

Professional ratings
Review scores
| Source | Rating |
|---|---|
| Allmusic | 2/5 stars |

Then and Now is the second greatest hits album from the American rock band Warrant, released May 4, 2004.

== Content ==
The album features the best tracks (singles) from all the Warrant albums released through CMC International which is now owned by Sanctuary Records including Belly to Belly, Warrant Live 86-97, which were both released after the first compilation The Best of Warrant (1996) and the 1995 album Ultraphobic, which did not feature any songs on the first compilation.

No songs from the albums Greatest and Latest and Under the Influence are included.

The album also features live performances of the hit singles "Down Boys", "Cherry Pie" "Uncle Tom's Cabin", "Machine Gun" and the band's biggest hit "Heaven", which all charted on the Mainstream rock charts and The Billboard Hot 100.

== Track listing ==
1. "D.R.F.S.R." (Live) - 2:43
2. "Family Picnic" - 4:36
3. "Down Boys" (Live) - 3:46
4. "Feels Good" - 2:48
5. "Heaven" (Live) - 2:32
6. "Followed" - 3:35
7. "Cherry Pie" (Live) - 7:16
8. "Indian Giver" - 4:46
9. "Uncle Tom's Cabin" (Live) - 5:06
10. "Stronger Now" - 3:57
11. "Machine Gun" (Live) - 4:04
12. "AYM" - 2:48
