= Rocking Tall =

Compilation album by Warrant
- Released: May 13, 1996
- Genre: Glam metal, hard rock
- Length: 36:04
- Label: Sony music
- Producer: Warrant

Warrant chronology
The Best of Warrant (1996)	Rocking Tall (1996)	Belly to Belly (1996)

Professional ratings
Review scores
Source	Rating
Allmusic	2.5/5 stars

Rocking Tall is a compilation album by the American rock band Warrant, released through Sony music in 1996. The collection spans the band's history from 1989 through 1992; although it does not include "Heaven", one of the band's most popular songs.

== Release ==
Rocking Tall was released in conjunction with The Best of Warrant, both albums released in the same year roughly one month apart: The Best of Warrant was released April 2, 1996, and Rocking Tall May 13, 1996. Rocking Tall featured as a second disc/alternate version to The Best of Warrant.

== Track listing ==
All tracks are written by Jani Lane, except where noted.

No.	Title	Writer(s)	Original Album	Length
1.	"Down Boys"		Dirty Rotten Filthy Stinking Rich	4:04
2.	"Train, Train"	S. Medlocke	Cherry Pie	2:49
3.	"Sometimes She Cries"	Lane, J. Dixon	Dirty Rotten Filthy Stinking Rich	4:44
4.	"32 Pennies"		Dirty Rotten Filthy Stinking Rich	3:09
5.	"Cold Sweat"		Dirty Rotten Filthy Stinking Rich	3:30
6.	"Cherry Pie"	Lane, J. Allen, Dixon, S. Sweet, E. Turner	Cherry Pie	3:21
7.	"Sure Feels Good to Me"	Lane, D. Stag, J.B. Frank	Cherry Pie	2:39
8.	"The Bitter Pill"		Dog Eat Dog	4:07
9.	"Quicksand"		Dog Eat Dog	3:58
10.	"Machine Gun"		Dog Eat Dog	3:44

== Personnel ==
- Jani Lane - vocals
- Joey Allen - guitar
- Erik Turner - guitar
- Jerry Dixon - bass
- Steven Sweet - drums
- Beau Hill - keyboards
