= Warrant Live 86–97 =

Live album by Warrant
- Released: July 29, 1997
- Recorded: November 22, 1996
- Venue: Harpos Concert Theatre (Detroit)
- Genres: Glam metal; hard rock
- Length: 66:23
- Label: Sanctuary Records

Warrant chronology
Belly to Belly (1996)	Warrant Live 86–97 (1997)	Greatest & Latest (1999)

Professional ratings
Review scores
Source	Rating
Allmusic	3/5 stars

Warrant Live 86–97 is the first live compilation album by American glam metal band Warrant released in 1997. It was recorded live at Harpos Concert Theatre in Detroit on November 22, 1996, in support of their most recent album Belly to Belly.

== Overview ==
The album features tracks from all of the band's previous albums which include most of Warrant's hit singles, including the band's biggest two singles "Heaven" and "Cherry Pie", all of which charted on the Mainstream Rock charts and The Billboard Hot 100.

The album was re-packaged and re-released in 2005 under the title "Warrant: Live Extended Versions" featuring only ten of the sixteen tracks and again in 2014 as "Warrant 10 Live".

== Track listing ==
1. "Intro" (0:28)
2. "D.R.F.S.R." (2:16)
3. "Down Boys" (3:52)
4. "Uncle Tom's Cabin" (5:08)
5. "A.Y.M." (3:11)
6. "Family Picnic" (6:01)
7. "Machine Gun" (4:12)
8. "Heaven" (2:38)
9. "Sometimes She Cries" (2:19)
10. "I Saw Red" (4:39)
11. "Hole in My Wall" (3:46)
12. "Feels Good" (5:00)
13. "Indian Giver" (6:01)
14. "32 Pennies" (5:23)
15. "Vertigo" (4:01)
16. "Cherry Pie" (7:28)

=== Extended Versions ===
1. "Down Boys"
2. "32 Pennies"
3. "Cherry Pie"
4. "Hole in My Wall"
5. "Family Picnic"
6. "Feels Good"
7. "Heaven"
8. "Sometimes She Cries"
9. "I Saw Red"
10. "Uncle Tom's Cabin"

=== 10 Live! ===
1. "Cherry Pie"
2. "Down Boys"
3. "Uncle Tom's Cabin"
4. "Heaven"
5. "Sometimes She Cries"
6. "I Saw Red"
7. "D.R.F.S.R."
8. "32 Pennies" (5:23)
9. "Machine Gun"
10. "Hole in My Wall"

== Credits ==
- Jani Lane: Lead Vocals
- Erik Turner: Rhythm Guitar
- Jerry Dixon: Bass
- Rick Steier: Lead Guitar
- Bobby Borg: Drums
- Danny Wagner: Keyboards
