= Josh Lewis =

Josh or Joshua Lewis may refer to:

- Josh Lewis (rugby league) (born 1985), Australian rugby league footballer
- Josh Lewis (guitarist) (born 1967), guitarist with Warrant
- Josh Lewis (Emmerdale), a character on the British soap opera Emmerdale
- Josh Lewis (rugby union) (born 1992), Welsh rugby union player
- Joshua Lewis (judge) (1772–1833), judge in the Territory of Orleans and Louisiana
