= Under the Influence (Warrant album) =

Studio album by Warrant
- Released: 12 June 2001
- Genre: Hard rock, glam metal
- Length: 42:11
- Label: Perris Records
- Producer: Matt Thorne & Warrant

Warrant chronology
Greatest & Latest (1999)	Under the Influence (2001)	Then and Now (2004)

Singles from Under the Influence
- 1. "Face" Released: 2001

Professional ratings
Review scores
Source	Rating
Allmusic	3/5 stars

Under the Influence is the sixth studio album by American rock band Warrant released in 2001. The album is a covers album with two original new tracks, "Face" and "Sub Human". The album is the last to feature vocalist Jani Lane, as the band's next release - Born Again features Black 'n Blue vocalist Jaime St. James.

== Background ==
The band toured in support of the album with Poison in the summer of 2001 on the Glam Slam Metal Tour which was cut 3 weeks short due to back injuries sustained by Poison bassist Bobby Dall.

The cover of AC/DC's "Down Payment Blues" features guitarist Billy Morris on lead vocals. Morris was the band's newest lead guitarist, replacing Keri Kelli, who was only in the band for 8 months after replacing Rick Steier in early 2000. The album also features Mike Fasano, who became the band's newest in a long line of drummers.

== Track listing ==
No.	Title	Writer(s)	Length
1.	"Toys in the Attic" (Aerosmith cover)	Joe Perry, Steven Tyler	3:01
2.	"Hollywood (Down on Your Luck)" (Thin Lizzy cover)	Scott Gorham, Phil Lynott	3:41
3.	"Dead, Jail or Rock 'n' Roll" (Michael Monroe cover)	Michael Monroe, Little Steven, Nasty Suicide	4:26
4.	"Hair of the Dog" (Nazareth cover)	Pete Agnew, Manny Charlton, Dan McCafferty, Darrell Sweet	3:23
5.	"Tie Your Mother Down" (Queen cover)	Brian May	3:51
6.	"Suffragette City" (David Bowie cover)	David Bowie	3:36
7.	"Surrender" (Cheap Trick cover)	Rick Nielsen	4:19
8.	"Down Payment Blues" (AC/DC cover)	Bon Scott, Angus Young	6:08
9.	"Come and Get It" (Badfinger cover)	Paul McCartney	2:59
10.	"Sub Human"	Jani Lane	3:05
11.	"Face"	Keri Kelli, J. Lane	3:42

== Personnel ==
- Jani Lane - Lead vocals
- Erik Turner - Rhythm Guitar
- Jerry Dixon - Bass Guitar
- Billy Morris - Lead Guitar, lead vocals (on "Down Payment Blues")
- Mike Fasano - Drums
- Mike Morris - Keyboards
