= Greatest & Latest (Warrant album) =

Studio album by Warrant
- Released: 1999
- Recorded: 1999
- Genres: Glam metal; hard rock
- Length: 62:30
- Label: Deadline
- Producers: Warrant; Matt Thorne

Warrant chronology
Warrant Live 86-97 (1997)	Greatest & Latest (1999)	Under the Influence (2001)

Singles from Greatest and Latest
- 1. "Southern Comfort" Released: 1999; 2. "Heaven '99" Released: 1999; 3. "Cherry Pie '99" Released: 1999

Professional ratings
Review scores
Source	Rating
Allmusic	2/5 stars

Greatest & Latest is an album by the American rock band Warrant, released in 1999. The album contains new recorded studio versions of their ("greatest") material with three previously unreleased ("latest") songs "The Jones", "Southern Comfort" and "Bad Tattoo."

== Background ==
The album was re-released twice in 2004 under new titles 'Cherry Pie all the Hitz 'n' More and the import version Most Wanted with slightly different track lists.

The album has new versions of Warrant's biggest hit singles "Heaven", which peaked at number 2 on The Billboard Hot 100, and "Cherry Pie", which peaked at #10. The re-recorded "Heaven" and "Cherry Pie" were released as promo and later iTunes singles and were also released on several mixed compilation albums. In 2004, Jani Lane re-recorded acoustic versions of "Cherry Pie" and "Heaven" which appeared on the "VH1 Classic Metal Mania: Stripped" compilations.

"Heaven" was used in Tool Academy's series finale and was covered by the American punk band New Found Glory on the compilation album Punk Goes Metal.

== Track listing ==
1. "Cherry Pie '99"
2. "The Jones"*
3. "Down Boys '99"
4. "Southern Comfort"* (co-written with Todd Meagher)
5. "Hollywood (So Far, So Good) '99"
6. "Uncle Tom's Cabin '99"
7. "Sometimes She Cries '99"
8. "32 Pennies '99"
9. "Heaven '99"
10. "Thin Disguise '99"
11. "I Saw Red '99"
12. "Bad Tattoo"*
13. "Down Boys (Julian Beeston Remix)" - (Bonus track)
14. "Cherry Pie (Sigue Sigue Sputnik Remix)" - (Bonus track)
15. "32 Pennies (Meeks Remix)" - (Bonus track)
16. "Down Boys (Razed in Black Remix)" - (Bonus track)

"Cherry Pie all the Hitz 'n' More" - instead of the last four club mixes it has two cover songs

13. "Lay Your Hands on Me" (Bon Jovi cover)
14. "Photograph" (Def Leppard cover)

"Most Wanted''" - instead of the last four club mixes it has four cover songs

13. "Lay Your Hands on Me" (Bon Jovi cover)
14. "Photograph" (Def Leppard cover)
15. "I Want You to Want Me" (Cheap Trick cover)
16. "Free for All" (Ted Nugent cover)

== Credits ==
- Jani Lane - lead vocals
- Erik Turner - guitar
- Jerry Dixon - bass guitar
- Rick Steier - lead guitar
- Bobby Borg - drums (for the new songs marked with *)

Additional personnel

- Danny Wagner - keyboards
- Mitch Dynamite (a.k.a. Jani Lane) - drums
