= Back Down to One =

Studio album by Jani Lane
- Released: August 22, 2003, reissued 2006
- Genres: Hard rock, glam metal
- Length: 35:44
- Labels: Just Having Fun Productions, Sidewinder Records
- Producers: Shawn Hackel, Jani Lane

Jani Lane chronology
Back Down to One (2003)	Love the Sin, Hate the Sinner (2008)

Professional ratings
Review scores
Source	Rating
Allmusic	3.5/5 stars

Back Down to One is the debut studio album by Jani Lane, former lead vocalist of the American hard rock band Warrant. Lane was still the lead singer of Warrant when this album was first released on August 22, 2003 featuring a band Lane assembled composed of guitarist Matt Cleary, ex-Defcon bass player Mark Mathews and drummer Adam Mercer. The bulk of the album material would be co-composed by his erstwhile Warrant colleague Keri Kelli.

== Production and marketing ==
In 1993 Jani Lane started working on his first solo project, titled "Jabberwocky", the album represented a significant musical departure from previous work but continued to be pushed back. Between 1997 and 2000, demos of Lane's solo material began surfacing on the Internet with some bids on eBay reaching an estimated $US100.00 per copy. In 2002, Lane decided to postpone the Jabberwocky project and instead release a brand new project as his debut solo album. He called his friend Dave Brooks, lead singer of the band Slammin' Gladys, who worked at the famous Grooveyard Studios in Akron, OH, as an audio engineer and producer, to help him record the record. Lane needed a rhythm section and found it at the Grooveyard in drummer Adam Mercer and bassist Mark Matthews, both credited on the Back Down To One album.

The new record "Back Down to One" would be picked up for a European licence by the British Z Records label. Shortly after the album's release Lane was admitted to a rehab center for alcohol and drug-related exhaustion. The album titled track was released as a promo single.

== Jani Lane's Warrant ==
Following rehab and nearly two years of arguments and disagreements with Warrant band members, Lane officially quit Warrant in January 2004, and after a few acting roles and appearances on compilations, attempted to restart his own version of Warrant. Although "Back Down to One" was credited as a solo release the singer assembled a new touring band for the album subsequently titled "JANI LANE'S WARRANT" and included Lizzy Borden guitarist Dario Lorina, Chad MacDonald on bass and Troy Patrick Farrell on drums. Unfortunately, his first batch of solo shows, in Michigan, would be stopped by legal action from his former bandmates objecting to the use of the Warrant band logo on his posters. Lane's former bandmates were not content with Jani quitting the band but Lane continued touring without the Warrant name and logo.

The cover art for the album features four bodies on the floor who possibly represented Lane's ex Warrant bandmates and Jani Lane as the only one left standing, meaning that Warrant was back down to one and the album represented a new Warrant (This was never intended or implied). The Warrant band members took offense to the cover art, which Lane later claimed after officially leaving Warrant, that it was only a joke from his cover artist, a joke his former bandmates didn't like.

In 2006 "Back Down to One" was reissued and finally released in the US and Lane continued to promote the album with his version of Warrant.

== Track listing ==
1. Funny (Kelli, Lane) 2:55
2. Better Than You (Kelli, Lane) 3:16
3. Nothing (Kelli, Lane) 3:09
4. How a Girl (Matt Cleary, Kelli, Lane) 3:42
5. Back Down to One (Kelli, Lane) 3:48
6. Hooked (Kelli, Lane) 2:49
7. Oh Yeah (Kelli, Lane) 3:09
8. Don't Trust Me (Kelli, Lane) 2:38
9. Twilight (Kelli, Lane) 3:06
10. 6 Feet Under (Kelli, Lane) 2:45
11. Sick (Kelli, Lane) 3:13

== Personnel ==
- Jani Lane: Lead Vocal
- Matt Cleary: Guitars
- Mark Matthews: Bass
- Adam Mercer: Drums
- Dave Brooks: Backing Vocal

=== Touring ===
- Dario Lorina: Guitars
- Chad Mcdonald: Bass
- Troy Patrick Farrell: Drums
- Shawn Zavodney: keyboards

== Production ==
- Executive Producer: Shawn Hackel
- Produced By Shawn Hackel & Jani Lane
- Engineered By Dave Brooks, Matt Cleary & Shawn Hackel
- Mixing: Dave Brooks, Matt Cleary, Jani Lane, Shawn Hackel
