= The Bitter Pill (Warrant song) =

Single by Warrant

from the album Dog Eat Dog
- Released: November 1992
- Recorded: 1992
- Genre: Hard rock
- Length: 4:07
- Label: Columbia
- Songwriter: Jani Lane

Warrant singles chronology
"Machine Gun" (1992)	"The Bitter Pill" (1992)	"The Hole In My Wall" (1992)

The Bitter Pill is the title of the fifth power ballad by the American hard rock band Warrant. The song was released in 1992 as the second single from Warrant's third album Dog Eat Dog which charted at number 25 on the Billboard 200.

== Recording and release ==
"The Bitter Pill" features an operatic interlude, performed in German by the "Moron Fish & Tackle Choir". The makeshift "Choir" consisted of security guards, engineers, janitors, and others who had been available at or near the recording studio.

The song charted in Australia and also appears on the Warrant compilation "Rocking Tall" released in 1996.

== Music video ==
The Bitter Pill features two different music videos, one with the album version of the song featuring the whole band in the video and one with the acoustic version of the song featuring only Jani Lane in the video. The video for the acoustic version was shot solely outside St Vincent de Paul Church located at 621 West Adams Blvd in South Los Angeles (intersection of West Adams and Figueroa).

== Track listing ==
- "The Bitter Pill" – 4:09
- "Quicksand" – 4:00
- "The Bitter Pill" (Acoustic Version) – 3:36
