= Gladiator (1992 soundtrack) =

Gladiator (Music From The Motion Picture)

Soundtrack album by Various artists
- Released: February 25, 1992
- Recorded: 1991–1992
- Studio: Chung King (New York, NY)
- Genre: Hip hop; rock; pop
- Length: 38:44
- Label: Columbia
- Producer: Budd Carr (exec.); Curtis Williams; Darryl Ross; David Cole; DJ Richie Rich; Easy Mo Bee; Erwin Musper; Marc Tanner; Martin Page; Michael Sembello; P.M. Dawn; Phil Bonanno; Robert Clivillés; Skip Drinkwater

Professional ratings
Review scores
Source	Rating
Allmusic	2/5 stars

Gladiator (Music From The Motion Picture) is the original soundtrack of Rowdy Herrington's 1992 film Gladiator. It was released on February 25, 1992 through Columbia Records and consisted of a blend of rock, hip hop, and pop music. The soundtrack failed to make the Billboard charts, but Clivillés and Cole's remake of "Pride (In the Name of Love)" made it to 54 on the Billboard Hot 100. Warrant's remake of "We Will Rock You" also made it to 83 on that chart. The title track was performed by the hip hop group 3rd Bass in what was the group's final appearance together.

== Track listing ==
No.	Title	Writer(s)	Producer(s)	Length
1.	"We Will Rock You" (performed by Warrant)	Brian May	Erwin Musper	2:56
2.	"Pride (In the Name of Love)" (performed by Clivillés and Cole)	U2	David Cole; Robert Clivillés	3:36
3.	"Hold on Tight" (performed by Tony Terry)	J. Cole; S. Devoreaux; C. Williams	Curtis Williams	4:52
4.	"Gladiator" (performed by 3rd Bass)	M. Berrin; P. Nash; R. Lawson	DJ Richie Rich; Easy Mo Bee (add.)	4:24
5.	"Latin Till I Die (Oye Como Va)" (performed by Gerardo)	Tito Puente	Michael Sembello	4:03
6.	"For the Love of Peace" (performed by P.M. Dawn)	A. Cordes; N. Hallam; R. Birch; T. Thomas	P.M. Dawn	3:29
7.	"The Power" (performed by Warrant)	Jani Lane	Erwin Musper	3:01
8.	"Count on Me" (performed by Martin Page)	M. Page	Martin Page	5:04
9.	"Da Me La (Fama)" (performed by Latin Science)	A. Rubalcava; D. Ross; R. Blades; D. Snyder; J. Batista; S. Campbell; S. Krywoschy	Darryl Ross; Skip Drinkwater	3:36
10.	"I Will Survive" (performed by Cheap Trick)	Clif Magness; Steve Kipner	Marc Tanner; Phil Bonanno (co.)	3:43
Total length:				38:44
