= Billy Morris (guitarist) =

- Occupations: Musician, producer, song writer
- Instruments: Guitar, Vocals

Billy Morris is a guitarist who has played in several bands including Warrant, Quiet Riot, Kidd Wicked, Spoyld, Beast, The Glorious Things, and the Billy Morris Band.

He guested with the band St. James, and has also played with former Mr. Big guitarist Paul Gilbert.

With Warrant, he produced and played on the album Under the Influence, on which he sang lead vocals on the cover of AC/DC's "Down Payment Blues", as well as playing guitar on the whole album.

The bands The Glorious Things and St. James both also featured former Warrant singer Jaime St. James.

In 2013, Morris played a string of shows with TUFF featuring lead singer Stevie Rachelle and original bass player Todd Chaisson.

In 2014, Morris co-produced and played guitar on Lipstick, the debut album of glam metal band Lipstick Generation.

In 2016, Morris signed with High Vol Records. On August 24, 2018 he released an original CD in 2, Holdin' All The Aces, with the first single being Party Like The Weekend Never Ends.

He is currently playing with cover band Sunset Strip in Cleveland, Ohio. In 2018 Morris and Sunset Strip were voted the best local cover band by The Cleveland Hotlist. Currently a Food Truck Owner
