= Born Again (Warrant album) =

Studio album by Warrant
- Released: June 27, 2006
- Recorded: 2005–2006
- Genres: Hard rock, glam metal
- Length: 45:51
- Label: Deadline/Cleopatra
- Producer: Pat Regan

Warrant chronology
Then and Now Warrant (2004)	Born Again (2006)	Rockaholic (2011)

Singles from Born Again
- 1. "Bourbon County Line" Released: 2006; 2. "Dirty Jack" Released: 2006

Professional ratings
Review scores
Source	Rating
Allmusic	3.5/5 stars
KNAC	4/5 stars
Melodic.net	2/5 stars
Metal Temple	(8/10)
Scream Magazine	4/6 stars

Born Again is Warrant's seventh studio album released on June 27, 2006. The album features ex-Black N' Blue vocalist Jaime St. James who replaced Jani Lane in 2004. Lane left the band due to personal and business disagreements and thus, Born Again is the first Warrant album not to feature him on lead vocals.

== Production and marketing ==
The album was produced by producer and engineer Pat Regan (Kiss, Deep Purple, Mr. Big, L.A. Guns) and also features the return of original members, lead guitarist Joey Allen and drummer Steven Sweet.

The track "Bourbon County Line" was released as the album's lead single, followed by the second single "Dirty Jack".

== Reception ==
The album received a generally positive reception, with reviewers praising the band's return to a traditional hard rock sound. Hard Rock Hideout said that the album was Warrant's best since Dog Eat Dog, and that "the whole vibe of this [album] sounds like Warrant in their heyday". Allmusic said that while Born Again did not "stretch the boundaries," it was nevertheless a "superb set of hard rock songs that sound and feel better than most music from the '80s" and praised the band's willingness to keep "consistency and faith in the original concept" of their music.

== Track listing ==
No.	Title	Writer(s)	Length
1.	"Devil's Juice"	Erik Turner, Jaime St. James	3:27
2.	"Dirty Jack"	Jerry Dixon	4:01
3.	"Bourbon County Line"	Turner, St. James, Dixon	3:51
4.	"Hell, CA"	St. James, Dixon	4:20
5.	"Angels"	Dixon	4:32
6.	"Love Strikes Like Lightning"	Dixon	3:56
7.	"Glimmer"	Joey Allen, Turner, St. James, Dixon	3:31
8.	"Roller Coaster"	St. James	2:48
9.	"Down In Diamonds"	Turner, Dixon	3:59
10.	"Velvet Noose"	Turner, Dixon	3:01
11.	"Roxy"	St. James	3:16
12.	"Good Times"	Dixon	4:09

== Personnel ==
Warrant

- Jaime St. James - Lead vocals
- Joey Allen - Lead guitar, Backing vocals
- Erik Turner - Rhythm guitar, Backing vocals
- Jerry Dixon - Bass, Backing vocals
- Steven Sweet - Drums, Backing vocals

Additional personnel

- Pat Regan - Keyboards

== Born Again: Delvis Video Diaries ==
Music videos were shot for all the songs on the Warrant album Born Again. They appear on the DVD Born Again: Delvis Video Diaries along with behind the scenes footage, on tour clips and the making of the album.

== Singles ==
- "Bourbon County Line"
- "Dirty Jack"
