= Metal Mayhem =

American music television program

- Genre: Heavy metal/hard rock music videos

Original release
- Network: VH1 Classic
- Release: 2003 – 2016
- Network: MTV Classic
- Release: August 12, 2016 – present

Metal Mayhem (formerly Metal Mania or Headbangers) is a block of classic heavy metal/hard rock music videos that first aired on the American television channel VH1 Classic from 2003 until 2016 rebrand. The series originally featured music videos from 1970s to early 1990s, but since VH1 Classic's transition to MTV Classic, it has now incorporated music videos from the 1980s to mid-1990s and some videos from the 1970s, 2000s, and 2010s. The block now airs every Friday between 8pm and midnight on different time zones. In addition, Metal Mania was briefly changed to Headbangers before reverting to its original title until it was changed to Metal Mayhem.

== VH1 Classic: Metal Mania - Stripped ==
VH1 Classic: Metal Mania - Stripped

Live album by Various Artists
- Released: November 23, 2004
- Genre: Glam metal
- Label: SideWinder/ Immortal (Red)
- Producer: Jamie Talbot
- Compiler: Jamie Talbot

Metal Mania chronology
VH1 Classic: Metal Mania - Stripped	VH1 Classic: Metal Mania - Stripped, Vol. 2: The Anthems

Volume 1
Review scores
Source	Rating
Allmusic	link

=== Track listing ===
No.	Title	Artist	Length
1.	"Every Rose Has Its Thorn"	Poison	4:30
2.	"Sister Christian"	Night Ranger	5:08
3.	"Wind of Change"	Scorpions	5:32
4.	"Don't Know What You've Got (Till It's Gone)"	Cinderella	5:10
5.	"Silent Lucidity"	Queensrÿche	5:30
6.	"More Than Words"	Extreme	4:11
7.	"I Saw Red"	Warrant	3:46
8.	"The Way It Is"	Tesla	6:06
9.	"Miles Away"	Winger	3:58
10.	"Ballad of Jayne"	LA Guns	4:56
11.	"When the Children Cry"	White Lion	4:30
12.	"When I Look into Your Eyes"	FireHouse	4:04
13.	"Fly to the Angels"	Slaughter	3:23
14.	"More than Words Can Say"	Alias	3:52
15.	"Save Your Love"	Great White	5:25

== VH1 Classic: Metal Mania - Stripped, Vol. 2: The Anthems ==
VH1 Classic: Metal Mania - Stripped, Vol. 2: The Anthems

Live album by Various Artists
- Released: October 18, 2005
- Genre: Glam metal
- Label: SideWinder/Immortal (RED)
- Producer: Jamie Talbot
- Compiler: Jamie Talbot

Metal Mania chronology
VH1 Classic: Metal Mania - Stripped	VH1 Classic: Metal Mania - Stripped, Vol. 2: The Anthems	VH1 Classic: Metal Mania - Stripped, Vol. 3

Volume 2
Review scores
Source	Rating
Allmusic	link

=== Track listing ===
No.	Title	Artist	Length
1.	"Rock You Like a Hurricane"	Scorpions	4:21
2.	"Here I Go Again"	White Snake	4:29
3.	"Don't Tell Me You Love Me"	Night Ranger	4:53
4.	"Talk Dirty to Me"	Poison	3:55
5.	"Shake Me"	Tom Keifer	3:39
6.	"Cherry Pie"	Warrant	2:59
7.	"Heaven's Trail (No Way Out)"	Tesla	4:41
8.	"Round and Round"	Ratt	4:34
9.	"Madelaine"	Kip Winger	3:20
10.	"Into the Fire"	Dokken	4:47
11.	"Smooth Up in Ya"	Bulletboys	3:59
12.	"(Can't Live Without Your) Love and Affection"	Nelson	4:03
13.	"Sex Action"	LA Guns	3:58
14.	"Don't Treat Me Bad"	FireHouse	4:16
15.	"Once Bitten, Twice Shy"	Great White	4:32

== Metal Mania: Stripped Across America Live! ==
Metal Mania: Stripped Across America Live!
- Directed by: Jack Edward Sawyers
- Produced by: Jamie Talbot
- Music by: Don Dokken, Great White, Kip Winger, and Mike Tramp
- Release date: February 21, 2006
- Running time: 68 minutes
- Country: United States
- Language: English

== VH1 Classic: Metal Mania - Stripped, Vol. 3 ==
VH1 Classic: Metal Mania - Stripped, Vol. 3

Live album by Various Artists
- Released: March 6, 2007
- Genres: Glam metal; heavy metal
- Label: Sidewinder Music

Metal Mania chronology
VH1 Classic: Metal Mania - Stripped, Vol. 2: The Anthems	VH1 Classic: Metal Mania - Stripped, Vol. 3

Volume 3
Review scores
Source	Rating
Allmusic	link

=== Track listing ===
No.	Title	Artist	Length
1.	"Unskinny Bop" (from MTV Unplugged)	Poison	3:48
2.	"High Enough"	Tommy Shaw, Jack Blades	5:07
3.	"Signs" (live)	Tesla	3:02
4.	"Headed for a Heartbreak"	Kip Winger	3:48
5.	"In My Dreams" (from One Live Night)	Dokken	4:33
6.	"When I Look into Your Eyes" (from Good Acoustics)	FireHouse	4:03
7.	"Way Cool Jr." (from MTV Unplugged)	Ratt	5:44
8.	"Heaven"	Jani Lane	4:05
9.	"Turn Up the Radio"	Steve Plunkett	4:01
10.	"Nobody's Fool"	Tom Keifer	2:58
11.	"Don't Close Your Eyes"	KIX	4:06
12.	"Just Take My Heart"	Eric Martin	3:47
13.	"The Killing Words" (from MTV Unplugged)	Queensrÿche	4:00
14.	"Up All Night" (live)	Slaughter	5:01
15.	"Balls to the Wall"	Accept	3:50
