= Rockaholic =

Studio album by Warrant
- Released: May 17, 2011
- Recorded: 2009–2010
- Genres: Hard rock, glam metal
- Length: 54:24
- Label: Frontiers Records
- Producer: Keith Olsen

Warrant chronology
Born Again (2006)	Rockaholic (2011)	Louder Harder Faster (2017)

Singles from Rockaholic
- 1. "Life's a Song" Released: 2011; 2. "Home" Released: 2011

Professional ratings
Review scores
Source	Rating
About.com	3.5/5 stars
Melodic.net	2.5/5 stars
Metalholic	(7.3/10)
Sea of Tranquility	3.5/5 stars

Rockaholic is the eighth studio album by American rock band Warrant, released on May 17, 2011. This is the first album to feature the band’s third lead singer Robert Mason, who replaced original lead singer Jani Lane in 2008. Lane returned to the band for a 2008 reunion tour but by the end of the year, he and the band parted ways for the second time. Lane had previously replaced former lead singer Jaime St. James, who performed lead vocals on the band's last album, Born Again, and who initially replaced Lane in 2004.

== Production and marketing ==
Warrant began recording Rockaholic in 2009 following the 2008 reunion tour which Robert Mason completed when Jani Lane was unable to complete the tour. The record was produced by Keith Olsen.

== Release and promotion ==
Rockaholic peaked at number 22 on the Billboard Top Hard Rock Albums chart.

The track "Life's a Song" was released as the first single from the album also featuring a music video and the track "Home" was released as the second single with a music video being released in October 2011.

== Musical style ==
Bass player Jerry Dixon commented: "I really think we captured a perfect mix of the past and present on this record. Each song has its own vibe that's going to take people on a kick-ass Warrant ride [...] There's enough 80's influence on songs like "Tears in the City" and "Sex Ain't Love" to keep the die-hard Warrant fans rocking while introducing them to new material."

== Tour ==
The Rockaholic Tour of Canada and the US with label mates Whitesnake as well as Cinderella and Poison, had Warrant playing over 50 dates in support of the album.

== Track listing ==
1. "Sex Ain't Love" (Dixon, Mason, Turner) - 3:57
2. "Innocence Gone" (Dixon, Mason) - 3:40
3. "Snake" (Mason) - 3:44
4. "Dusty's Revenge" (Dixon, Mason, Turner) - 4:26
5. "Home" (Mason) - 3:27
6. "What Love Can Do" (Dixon) - 4:19
7. "Life's a Song" (Dixon) - 4:09
8. "Show Must Go On" (Dixon, Mason) - 2:48
9. "Cocaine Freight Train" (Dixon, Mason) - 2:57
10. "Found Forever" (Mason) - 4:14
11. "Candy Man" (Dixon, Turner) - 4:04
12. "Sunshine" (Dixon, Mason, Duncan) - 3:53
13. "Tears in the City" (Dixon) - 3:34
14. "The Last Straw" (Dixon, Mason, Turner) - 4:12

== Personnel ==
- Robert Mason - Lead vocals
- Joey Allen - Lead guitar, Backing vocals
- Erik Turner - Rhythm guitar, Backing vocals
- Jerry Dixon - Bass, Backing vocals
- Steven Sweet - Drums, Backing vocals

== Charts ==
Chart (2011)	Peak position
US Top Hard Rock Albums (Billboard)	22
