= Blind Faith (Warrant song) =

Single by Warrant

from the album Cherry Pie
- Released: June 1991
- Recorded: 1990
- Genre: Glam metal
- Length: 3:33
- Label: Columbia
- Songwriter(s): Jani Lane

Warrant singles chronology
"Uncle Tom's Cabin" (1991)	"Blind Faith" (1991)	"We Will Rock You" (1992)

Blind Faith is American rock band Warrant's fourth power ballad. It was released in 1991 as the fourth single from Warrant's second album Cherry Pie. The song charted at #88 on the Billboard Hot 100 and #39 on the Mainstream Rock Tracks chart.

== Music video ==
The power ballad features acoustic guitar, banjo, piano mixed in with guitars. The music video begins in black and white with Jani Lane singing and playing guitar against a black background. The band joins him at the chorus and the video turns into color.

== Track listing ==
No.	Title	Length
1.	"Blind Faith"	3:32
2.	"Mr. Rainmaker"	3:29

== Charts ==
Chart (1991)	Peak position
US Billboard Hot 100	88
US Mainstream Rock (Billboard)	39
