= Louder Harder Faster =

Studio album by Warrant
- Released: May 12, 2017
- Recorded: 2016
- Genre: Hard rock, glam metal
- Length: 49:00
- Label: Frontiers
- Producer: Jeff Pilson

Warrant chronology
Rockaholic (2011)	Louder Harder Faster (2017)

Singles from Louder Harder Faster
- 1. "I Think I'll Just Stay Here and Drink" Released: February 10, 2017; 2. "Only Broken Heart" Released: March 24, 2017; 3. "Devil Dancer" Released: April 7, 2017; 4. "Perfect" Released: April 21, 2017; 5. "Louder Harder Faster" Released: May 4, 2017

Louder Harder Faster is the ninth studio album by American rock band Warrant, released on May 12, 2017. The album features long-time band members Erik Turner, Jerry Dixon, Joey Allen, and Steven Sweet, and is the band's second album with Robert Mason on lead vocals. This is the band's first album in six years and their first to be released following the death of original lead singer Jani Lane.

The album charted at No. 19 on the Billboard Top Independent Albums chart and No. 97 on the Billboard 200 chart.

== Production and marketing ==
In 2016 Warrant guitarist Allen announced that the band intended to enter a recording studio in the fall (possibly in Nashville or Los Angeles) to begin its follow up to 2011's Rockaholic. The band already had nine new songs fully demoed and another 20 ideas "floating around".

Louder Harder Faster was produced by Jeff Pilson and was mixed by Pat Regan except for the song "I Think I'll Just Stay Here and Drink", which was mixed by Chris "The Wizard" Collier.

== Content ==
The new album features 12 new songs including a remake of the classic Merle Haggard song "I Think I'll Just Stay Here and Drink" as the first single and the 'Professional Bull Riders' new "party anthem". The official video premiered at an official kickoff party at St Louis in Ballpark Village on February 25, accompanied by a live performance. The clip was filmed in Anaheim and will be played every night at midnight in the seven PBR Bars across the country as a clarion call for the good times to continue.

"Only Broken Heart" was released as a single for the album on March 24, 2017 followed by "Devil Dancer" on April 4, 2017 and "Perfect" on April 21, 2017. The band also released the single and music video for the album's title track "Louder Harder Faster" on May 4, 2017.

== Musical style ==
Erik Turner stated, "You can hear and feel the emotions of the last 25 + years of being in this band poured into LHF. The fun and the frustrations, the pleasure and the pain... a whole lot of blood, sweat, tears and beers went into the making of this album. Love it or hate it, it's the real deal, 100% pure melodic hard rock. Hand crafted by five musicians who dedicated their lives to music when they were just little kids with big dreams." Jerry Dixon adds, "Louder Harder Faster is truly one of our best records to date. It has all the classic Warrant ingredients that people have come to know, plus a lot of extras that keep it in the modern realm of today's music. It's a perfect mix between Balls and Ballads. When we started this project over two years ago, we wanted to bring the listener back to the days of sitting in the living room and cranking up a record from start to finish. Making full records seems to be a lost art, we hope in some small way that this album helps people find that art again."

== Tour ==
The tour started in Las Vegas on May 12, 2017 and concluded on January 19, 2019 in Manistee, Michigan after 91 shows.

== Track listing ==
All tracks are written by Jerry Dixon and Robert Mason, except where noted.

No.	Title	Length
1.	"Louder, Harder, Faster" (Mason)	2:56
2.	"Devil Dancer"	4:16
3.	"Perfect"	4:09
4.	"Only Broken Heart" (Dixon, Mason, Erik Turner)	4:52
5.	"U In My Life" (Mason, Joe West)	3:50
6.	"Music Man"	4:25
7.	"Faded"	3:40
8.	"New Rebellion"	3:44
9.	"Big Sandy"	2:34
10.	"Choose Your Fate"	3:52
11.	"Let It Go"	4:08
12.	"Stop the World ( bonus track for Japan release )"	3:22
13.	"I Think I'll Just Stay Here and Drink" (Merle Haggard)	3:06
Total length:		49:00

== Personnel ==
- Robert Mason – lead vocals
- Joey Allen – lead guitar, backing vocals
- Erik Turner – rhythm guitar, backing vocals
- Jerry Dixon – bass guitar, backing vocals
- Steven Sweet – drums, backing vocals

== Charts ==
Chart (2017)	Peak position
Swiss Albums (Schweizer Hitparade)	98
UK Rock & Metal Albums (OCC)	35
US Top Album Sales (Billboard)	97
US Independent Albums (Billboard)	19
