= Big Talk (song) =

Single by Warrant

from the album Dirty Rotten Filthy Stinking Rich
- Released: October 1989
- Recorded: 1988
- Genre: Glam metal
- Length: 3:43
- Label: Columbia
- Songwriter: Jani Lane

Warrant singles chronology
"Heaven" (1989)	"Big Talk" (1989)	"Sometimes She Cries" (1990)

Big Talk is a song by American glam metal band Warrant. It was released in 1989 as the third single from Warrant's debut album Dirty Rotten Filthy Stinking Rich. The song charted at #30 on the Mainstream Rock Tracks chart and #93 on the Billboard Hot 100.

== Music video ==
The music video features the album cover character—calling himself "Cashly Guido Bucksley", an overpaid, amoral infrastructure manager and archetypal business psychopath who is watching Warrant in concert. The video begins with a meeting with the corrupt music executive before the band are locked in a cage and Jani Lane is strapped in an electric chair. The character also features throughout the video album "'Warrant: Live - Dirty Rotten Filthy Stinking Rich" which was certified Platinum.

== Tracklisting ==
No.	Title	Length
1.	"Big Talk"	3:42
2.	"D.R.F.S.R."	3:17

== Charts ==
Chart (1989)	Peak position
Australia (ARIA)	111
US Billboard Hot 100	93
US Mainstream Rock (Billboard)	30
