= Josh Lewis (guitarist) =

- Born: October 15, 1967 (age 57)
- Instrument: Guitar

Josh Lewis (born October 15, 1967) is one of the two original Warrant guitarists, the other being Erik Turner, who is still in the band. He played on such early Warrant demos as "You've Got A Broken Heart" and "Tease Machine".

Josh Lewis was replaced in Warrant by Joey Allen.

He later played in several other bands including Devai-5000, featuring singer Traci Devai, bassist Willi Duett, and his Warrant bandmate drummer Max Asher.

In 2010 Josh formed The Late Lights in London.

He appears on VH1's Rock and Roll Fantasy Camp in camp counselor Mark Hudson's band (Tugboat Circus) in an effort to relive the past he gave up when he was replaced by the band Warrant just before they were signed and entered hair metal history.
