= Bobbie Brown =

American actress and model (born 1969)

- Born: Bobbie Jean Brown; October 7, 1969 (age 57); Baton Rouge, Louisiana, U.S.
- Other name: Bobbie Brown-Lane
- Height: 5 ft 8 in (1.73 m)
- Spouse: Jani Lane (m. 1991; div. 1993)
- Children: 1
- Beauty pageant titleholder
- Title: Miss Louisiana Teen USA 1987
- Hair color: Blonde
- Eye color: Blue
- Major competition: Miss Teen USA 1987 (2nd runner-up)

Bobbie Jean Brown (born October 7, 1969), sometimes credited as Bobbie Brown-Lane, is an American actress, model, and former beauty pageant contestant. She appeared in the 1989 videos for Great White's "Once Bitten, Twice Shy" and "House of Broken Love", and in the 1990 video for Warrant's song "Cherry Pie".

== Early life ==
Brown was born on October 7, 1969, in Baton Rouge, Louisiana. She is the oldest child of Bobby Gene and Judy Ann Brown (née Faul). Brown has three siblings: a brother, a half brother, and a half sister. Her parents divorced when she was a freshman in high school and her mother later remarried. Brown attended high school at Starkey Academy in Central, Louisiana.

== Career ==
Brown won the Miss Louisiana Teen USA 1987 title and represented Louisiana in the Miss Teen USA 1987 pageant broadcast live from El Paso, Texas in July 1987. Brown won the spokesmodel competition on Star Search a record thirteen times. In 1990, she hosted the syndicated fashion series Preview: The Best of the New. Brown also appeared in TV shows such as Married... with Children (three episodes) and films such as 1993's Last Action Hero in which fellow Miss Teen USA Bridgette Wilson portrayed Arnold Schwarzenegger's daughter.

Brown worked as a model for Budweiser and other companies. She also appeared in music videos, including Great White's "Once Bitten, Twice Shy" and "House of Broken Love", Hurricane's "I'm On to You", and Louie Louie's "Sittin' in the Lap of Luxury". She is best remembered as the girl in Warrant's "Cherry Pie" video released in 1990.

In the late 1990s, she hosted a TV infomercial that advertised the eight-CD set called "Big Rock: The 80s Generation". In 1998, she sued Penthouse for featuring a model also named Bobbie Brown. In 2009, Brown wrote and hosted the VH1 documentary series, "Do It for the Band: Women of the Sunset Strip".

In 2012, Brown joined the cast of the reality show Ex-Wives of Rock, airing on the Fuse network. In November 2013, Brown's memoir co-written with Caroline Ryder and titled Dirty Rocker Boys: Love and Lust on the Sunset Strip, was published by Gallery Books, a division of Simon & Schuster, Inc. Brown used to run an online clothing store bobbiejeanbrown.net, though the site is currently offline.

In 2016, Brown appeared as Lexxi's mother in Live from Lexxi's Mom's Garage and also is on the album cover, an acoustic live DVD by Steel Panther, and also appeared in their music video for "She's Tight".

== Personal life ==
In her 2013 memoirs, Brown admitted that she was a cocaine and methamphetamine addict for a decade. Brown used the latter to drop weight quickly before modeling shoots. She completed several stints in rehab before finally becoming sober in the 2000s. Brown also revealed that she has trichotillomania, a compulsive hair-pulling disorder, which she developed in 2005 while she was involved in what she called "the worst relationship of my entire life".

During the shooting of Warrant's "Cherry Pie" video, Brown met lead singer Jani Lane. Lane and Brown married on July 15, 1991. They had a daughter, Taylar Jayne Lane, in 1992, and divorced in 1993. After her divorce from Lane, Brown was engaged to Mötley Crüe drummer Tommy Lee. They broke up in February 1995, and Lee married Pamela Anderson four days later.

== Author ==
Brown co-wrote an autobiography, Dirty Rocker Boys, with Caroline Ryder which was published in 2013.

== Filmography ==
Film and television
Year	Title	Role	Notes
1987	Miss Teen USA	Bobbie Brown	Bobbie Brown
1990	Star Search	Spokesmodel Bobbie Brown	Twelve wins
1990	Lifestyles of the Rich and the Famous	Spokesmodel Bobbie Brown	Matthew Nelson trip to Arizona
1991	Cool as Ice	Monique	Credited as Bobby Brown
1991	Married... with Children	Nibbles & Pecan	3 episodes: season 5 episode: 19 & 20 "You Better Shop Around" part 1 & 2; episode 23 "Route 666" part 2
1992	Double Trouble	Peter's girlfriend	
1993	Betrayal of the Dove	Erotic Dancer	
1993	Last Action Hero	Video Babe	Bobbi Brown – Lane
1995	Baywatch Nights	Wanda	1 episode
1995	Renegade	Trish	1 episode: season 4 episode 10: "Another Place and Time"
1996	Kounterfeit	Dancer	
1996	Rudy Coby: Ridiculously Dangerous	Hourglass	Plays Rudy's ex-girlfriend
1997	NewsRadio	Irene	2 episodes: season 3 episode 22 "The Real Deal"; episode 24 "Space"
1998	Get a Job		
1998	Mike Hammer, Private Eye	Randi, the Birthday Cake Girl	1 episode: season 1 episode 10 "The Life You Save"
1998	The Godson	Sunny's Babe	
1999	Battle Dome	Bobbie Haven	
2012	Ex-Wives of Rock	Bobbie Brown	Bobbie Brown

Music videos
Year	Song title	Performer
1988	"I'm On to You"	Hurricane
1988	"Cecilia"	Times Two
1989	"Once Bitten, Twice Shy"	Great White
1989	"House of Broken Love"	Great White
1990	"Sittin' in the Lap of Luxury"	Louie Louie
1990	"It Feels So Good to Love Someone Like You"	Terence Trent D'Arby
1990	"Cherry Pie"	Warrant
2012	"Cougar"	Scott Carey
2016	"She's Tight"	Steel Panther
