= Rick Steier =

- Born: October 8, 1960 (age 65); Louisville, Kentucky
- Genres: Glam metal, heavy metal
- Occupation: Musician
- Instrument(s): Guitar, keyboards, synthesizers

Rick Steier (born October 8, 1960, in Louisville, Kentucky) is a guitarist who has played in the bands Warrant, Kingdom Come, Wild Horses, and KrunK/Kottak. Drummer and fellow Louisville native James Kottak was also in all these bands with Rick Steier.

== Discography ==
=== With Kingdom Come ===
- Kingdom Come (1988)
- In Your Face (1989)

=== With Wild Horses ===
- Bareback (1991)
- Dead Ahead (2003)

=== With Warrant ===
- Ultraphobic (1995)
- Belly to Belly Vol. 1 (1996)
- Warrant Live 86-97 (1997)
- Greatest & Latest (1999)
