= Belly to Belly =

Studio album by Warrant
- Released: October 1, 1996
- Recorded: 1996
- Genres: Hard rock; alternative rock; grunge
- Length: 43:57
- Label: CMC International
- Producers: Jerry Dixon, Jani Lane, Stefan Neary, Rick Steier, Erik Turner

Warrant chronology
Rocking Tall (1996)	Belly to Belly (1996)	Warrant Live 86-97 (1997)

Singles from Belly to Belly
- 1. "A.Y.M." Released: 1996; 2. "Feels Good" Released: 1996; 3. "Indian Giver" Released: 1997

Professional ratings
Review scores
Source	Rating
Allmusic	2/5 stars

Belly to Belly is the fifth studio album by American glam metal band Warrant. The record was released on October 1, 1996, through CMC International. The album features ex-Beggars & Thieves drummer Bobby Borg who replaced James Kottak. It is the last Warrant album of all original material to feature Jani Lane on vocals.

== Production and marketing ==
The making of the record was a collaborative process. The members of Warrant got together for one week in November 1995 and one week in January 1996 and wrote songs together. The recording process lasted a further two weeks, and the record was mixed in seven days.

== Songs ==
The record was described by guitarist Rick Steier as a "concept album" that follows a rags-to-riches-to-rags storyline concerning fame, fortune and the examination of one's value system once the spotlight fades, Musically, The album bore no resemblance to the glam metal of the band's past, and also continued the alternative direction of Ultraphobic.

The first single "A.Y.M." (Angry Young Man) was recorded in one take. During a flight to Japan for shows at a United States Naval Base, guitarist Rick Steier suggested to Lane that he put a twist in the lyrics for the then incomplete song. When the band got back into the studio, Lane re-wrote the lyrics as a "tongue-in-cheek satirical look at the alternative thing". The single features a live music video.

The second single "Feels Good" was about the band "starting from scratch". Vocalist Jani Lane explained that the song dealt with being free from major label pressure to "follow up this big hit or that hit". The band was given complete control to do whatever seemed appropriate to the members, without having to try to please others.

"Letter to a Friend" was an idea Lane had about how relationships should end; the parties agree that they don't gel, but that they can go their separate ways without animosity. Lane admits that this was "wishful thinking", since all of his failed relationships have ended on bad terms.

"All 4 U" features a duet with the girlfriend of the part owner of the studio in which the record was produced. Lane thought her vocals sounded "a little like Stevie Nicks" and asked her to perform on the album.

"Indian Giver" was released as the third single of the album and was written by Jani Lane after making up with his second wife, Rowanne Brewer following a brief argument.

== Track listing ==
No.	Title	Length
1.	"In the End (There's Nothing)"	3:11
2.	"Feels Good"	2:50
3.	"Letter to a Friend"	4:33
4.	"A.Y.M. (Angry Young Man)"	2:49
5.	"Indian Giver"	4:54
6.	"Falling Down"	3:56
7.	"Interlude # 1"	0:11
8.	"Solid"	3:13
9.	"All 4 U"	3:39
10.	"Coffee House"	4:37
11.	"Interlude # 2"	0:17
12.	"Vertigo"	2:35
13.	"Room With a View"	2:59
14.	"Nobody Else"	4:13
Total length:		43:57

== Credits ==
- Jani Lane - Lead Vocals
- Erik Turner - Rhythm Guitar
- Jerry Dixon - Bass Guitar
- Rick Steier - Lead Guitar
- Bobby Borg - Drums

Additional personnel

- Danny Wagner - Keyboards, backing vocals
- Periel Marr - additional vocals on “All 4 U”

== Singles ==
- "A.Y.M."
- "Feels Good"
- "Indian Giver"
