= Ultraphobic =

Studio album by Warrant
- Released: March 7, 1995
- Recorded: 1994
- Studios: One on One (Los Angeles); The Complex (Los Angeles)
- Genres: Hard rock; alternative metal; grunge
- Length: 43:03
- Label: CMC International
- Producer: Beau Hill

Warrant chronology
Dog Eat Dog (1992)	Ultraphobic (1995)	The Best of Warrant (1996)

Singles from Ultraphobic
- 1. "Family Picnic" Released: 1995; 2. "Stronger Now" Released: 1995; 3. "Followed" Released: 1995

Professional ratings
Review scores
Source	Rating
Allmusic	3/5 stars
Q	3/5 stars

Ultraphobic is the fourth studio album by American glam metal band Warrant. Released on March 7, 1995, on CMC International, after the apparent breakup of the band, the record was regarded as the band's "comeback" album. It is the first album to feature former Kingdom Come and Wild Horses members Rick Steier and James Kottak who came in to replace original band members Joey Allen and Steven Sweet.

== Production and marketing ==
Warrant began recording Ultraphobic in November 1994 with producer Beau Hill. The band supported the release of the record with a national tour beginning in Dallas, Texas.

A music video was made for the first single "Family Picnic" with a strong message against family violence and for the second single "Stronger Now", which ended up becoming Lane's best song because it was therapeutic to him.

"Followed" was released as the third single of the album.

== Musical style ==
Ultraphobic saw Warrant acknowledging the grunge phenomenon with a record that openly admitted to a Seattle influence, although it was still a natural progression from the hard edged Dog Eat Dog. It is vaguely similar to Danger Danger's Dawn, which was also released in 1995. In particular, the record represented an experimentation with the grunge sounds which had by this time become popular, and which, ironically, had contributed to the band's commercial demise. In songs such as "Undertow" and "Followed", the band attempted to mix pop metal sounds with the alternative stylings of Seattle bands such as Alice in Chains and Soundgarden.

== Lyrics ==
Many of the lyrics on Ultraphobic were inspired by Jani Lane's divorce from Bobbie Brown, the video model who appeared in the "Cherry Pie" music video.

== Track listing ==
No.	Title	Writer(s)	Length
1.	"Undertow"	Jani Lane, Rick Steier	3:12
2.	"Followed"	Beau Hill, Jani Lane, Jerry Dixon	3:41
3.	"Family Picnic"	Beau Hill, James Kottak, Jani Lane, Jerry Dixon	4:43
4.	"Sum of One"	Jani Lane	3:37
5.	"Chameleon"	Jani Lane, Jerry Dixon, Rick Steier	5:23
6.	"Crawl Space"	Jani Lane, Rick Steier	2:38
7.	"Live Inside of You"	Erik Turner, James Kottak, Jani Lane, Rick Steier	3:17
8.	"High"	Jani Lane, M. Tanner, Rick Steier	4:02
9.	"Ride #2"	Erik Turner, Jani Lane, Jerry Dixon	5:07
10.	"Ultraphobic"	James Kottak, Jani Lane, Rick Steier	3:25
11.	"Stronger Now"	Jani Lane	3:57
Total length:			43:03

== Personnel ==
- Jani Lane – lead vocals
- Erik Turner – rhythm guitar
- Jerry Dixon – bass guitar
- Rick Steier – lead guitar
- James Kottak – drums

Additional personnel

- Dave White – keyboards

Production

- Beau Hill – mixing
- Mixed at Enterprise Studios, Burbank, California
- Mastered at Sterling Sound, New York City

== Charts ==
Chart (1995)	Peak position
UK Rock & Metal Albums (Official Charts)	10
