= Cherry Pie (album) =

- Standard cover with model and actress Bobbie Brown, who married lead singer Jani Lane in 1991

Studio album by Warrant
- Released: September 11, 1990
- Recorded: 1990
- Studio: The Enterprise (Burbank, California)
- Genre: Glam metal
- Length: 38:14
- Label: Columbia
- Producer: Beau Hill

Warrant chronology
| Dirty Rotten Filthy Stinking Rich (1989) | Cherry Pie (1990) | Dog Eat Dog (1992) |

Singles from Cherry Pie
- 1. "Cherry Pie" Released: August 1990; 2. "I Saw Red" Released: November 1990; 3. "Uncle Tom's Cabin" Released: February 1991; 4. "Blind Faith" Released: June 1991

Professional ratings
Review scores
| Source | Rating |
|---|---|
| AllMusic | 4/5 stars |
| Chicago Tribune | 3/4 stars |
| Entertainment Weekly | C (1990); C− (1991) |
| Los Angeles Times | 2.5/5 stars |
| Rolling Stone | 2/5 stars |

Cherry Pie is the second studio album by American glam metal band Warrant, released September 11, 1990. The album is the band's highest-selling release, peaking at #7 on the Billboard 200. The album features the Top 40 hits "Cherry Pie" and "I Saw Red", as well as "Uncle Tom's Cabin" and "Blind Faith", which charted at #78 and #88 on the Billboard Hot 100, respectively. Cherry Pie is a notable release in the glam metal genre, selling over two million copies in the United States and being certified double-platinum by the RIAA.

== Production and marketing ==
Cherry Pie was released on September 11, 1990, through Columbia Records. Like its predecessor, Dirty Rotten Filthy Stinking Rich, it was recorded at The Enterprise in Burbank, California.

The music video for "Cherry Pie" featured model and actress Bobbie Brown, who had previously starred in music videos for the band Great White. Her appearance on the album cover and in promotional videos earned her the reputation as the "Cherry Pie girl", which she came to embrace over the years. Brown and Jani Lane met during the film shooting for the video, and later began a relationship. They were eventually engaged and married in 1991.

It is rumored that Erik Turner and Joey Allen did not play on the album and that all guitar work had been performed by ex-Streets guitarist and session musician Mike Slamer. The rumor has never been verified, although Slamer's wife confirmed in 1998 that her husband played guitar on the record. The album's liner notes refer to Turner's function as "G-string" and Allen's as "Bong Riffs", adding that "Erik & Joey would like to thank Mike Slamer & Tommy Girvin for their Wielding G string Inspirations". Producer Beau Hill stated in a 2012 interview that Slamer did in fact play on the album. Beau had said to the band that the "songs are really great, but I think we're a little weak in the solo department and so I like to bring somebody in". Beau also stated that "everybody in the band signed off on it and everything was done above ground".

Slamer was joined by numerous other guest performers; the record also features contributions from Jani Lane's brother Erik Oswald, guitarist C. C. DeVille from Poison, guitarist and bassist Bruno Ravel and drummer Steve West from Danger Danger, and singer Fiona.

The album carried a parental advisory sticker in the United States, due to the final track, "Ode to Tipper Gore", which consisted of a collection of swear words cut from the band's live performances. A "clean" version of the album also existed, with the final track removed, and an audible "bleep" of a curse in a previous song, "Train, Train", which featured the line "All a-fucking-board" at the beginning of the uncensored version.

Canadian cable-TV music network MuchMusic refused to air the "Cherry Pie" video on the grounds that it was "offensively sexist".

== Songs ==
The album's lead single, "Cherry Pie", was dedicated to the president of Sony Music Entertainment US Don Ienner. The dedication was no doubt inspired by the record company pressure which led to the track's creation. The record was completed without the song, but Warrant's label requested that a new rock "anthem" be added in order to enhance its marketability. Vocalist Lane responded by writing "Cherry Pie" in 15 minutes. Bassist Jerry Dixon and guitarist Allen, who believed the album was complete and were playing in a charity golf tournament in Denver, were called back to Los Angeles to complete the track. The single comprises a string of metaphorical references to sex and bears some melodic resemblance to Def Leppard's "Pour Some Sugar on Me", and The Arrows' "I Love Rock 'n' Roll". The guitar solo was performed by Poison's guitarist C. C. DeVille. At the end of the solo, a vocal aside says "I'm a trained professional".

"Cherry Pie" became a Top Ten hit on the Billboard Hot 100, reaching number 10 and also reached number 19 on the Mainstream Rock Tracks. The song has been cited by many as a "rock anthem". In 2009, it was named the 56th best hard rock song of all time by VH1.

The video for "Cherry Pie" received heavy airplay on MTV and other music video stations. It featured the members of Warrant and a scantily clad woman (model Bobbie Brown) who is seen dancing throughout the video while the band members perform and make tongue-in-cheek references to the song's lyrics (for example, when the above-quoted line referencing baseball is sung, Brown appears in a form-fitting baseball uniform, complete with a bat), all against a white background.

Brown became involved with Lane soon after the video was shot, and married him in 1991.

The record's second single was "I Saw Red", a power ballad inspired by a true story of betrayal. It was written after Lane had walked in on his girlfriend in bed with his best friend, resulting in his nervous breakdown and the delayed release of the band's first record Dirty Rotten Filthy Stinking Rich. The song was one of Warrant's most successful singles, reaching number 10 on the Billboard Hot 100, number 14 on the Mainstream Rock Tracks chart and #36 on the Australian charts and spawning two music videos.

Prior to the writing of the song "Cherry Pie", the album's title and first single was to have been "Uncle Tom's Cabin", a track which foreshadowed the kind of imaginative songwriting which would later be more fully revealed on the Dog Eat Dog record. Although named after the classic novel by Harriet Beecher Stowe, the song tells the story of a witness to the involvement of local police in a double murder and appeared to have nothing to do with slavery, racism, or the Deep South (although the video for the song was set in Louisiana). It was eventually released as the third single (removing the solo acoustic guitar intro) and charted at number 78 on the Billboard Hot 100 and number 19 on the Mainstream Rock Tracks chart.

"Blind Faith" was released as the fourth single from album. The song charted at number 88 on the Billboard Hot 100 and number 39 on the Mainstream Rock Tracks chart and also featured a music video.

== Track listing ==
All tracks are written by Jani Lane, except where noted.

| No. | Title | Writer(s) | Length |
|---|---|---|---|
| 1. | "Cherry Pie" | | 3:20 |
| 2. | "Uncle Tom's Cabin" | | 4:01 |
| 3. | "I Saw Red" | | 3:47 |
| 4. | "Bed of Roses" | Bonnie Hayes, Lane | 4:04 |
| 5. | "Sure Feels Good to Me" | Johnny B. Frank, Lane, Danny Stag | 2:39 |
| 6. | "Love in Stereo" | | 3:06 |
| 7. | "Blind Faith" | | 3:33 |
| 8. | "Song and Dance Man" | | 2:58 |
| 9. | "You're the Only Hell Your Mama Ever Raised" | | 3:34 |
| 10. | "Mr. Rainmaker" | | 3:29 |
| 11. | "Train, Train" (Blackfoot cover) | Shorty Medlocke | 2:49 |
| 12. | "Ode to Tipper Gore" (live) | | 0:55 |
| Total length: | | | 38:14 |

Bonus tracks
| No. | Title | Length |
|---|---|---|
| 13. | "Game of War" (demo) | 3:38 |
| 14. | "The Power" (demo) | 3:00 |

Rock Candy 2017 reissue bonus tracks
| No. | Title | Length |
|---|---|---|
| 15. | "Thin Disguise" | 3:16 |
| 16. | "I Saw Red" (acoustic) | 3:47 |
| 17. | "Cherry Pie" (single version) | 3:12 |

== Personnel ==
Warrant

- Jani Lane – vocals, acoustic guitar, arranger
- Joey Allen – rhythm guitar, banjo, guitar solos on tracks 2, 4, 7, 8, 10 and 1st solo on track 11
- Erik Turner – rhythm guitar, arrangement
- Jerry Dixon – bass guitar
- Steven Sweet – drums

Additional personnel

- C. C. DeVille – guitar solo on track 1
- Mike Slamer – guitar solos on tracks 2, 3, 5, 6, 9 and 2nd solo on track 11
- Eric Oswald (Jani Lane's brother) – acoustic intro on "Uncle Tom's Cabin"
- Scott Warren – keyboards
- Bruno Ravel – backing vocals
- Steve West – backing vocals
- Fiona – backing vocals
- Alan Hewitt – organ, piano, strings
- Beau Hill – organ, banjo, arrangement, keyboards, production, mixing
- Paul Harris – piano, strings
- Juke Logan – harmonica

Production

- Jimmy Hoyson – engineering, mixing
- Martin Horenburg – assistant engineer
- Dave Collins – digital editing, sequencing
- Hugh Syme – art direction, design
- Dale Lavi – photography
- Danny Stag – arrangements
- Johnny B. Frank – arrangements
- Ted Jensen – mastering

== Charts ==
| Chart (1990–91) | Peak position |
|---|---|
| Australian Albums (ARIA) | 13 |
| Canada Top Albums/CDs (RPM) | 34 |
| Japanese Albums (Oricon) | 26 |
| US Billboard 200 | 7 |

== Certifications ==
| Region | Certification | Certified units/sales |
|---|---|---|
| Australia (ARIA) | Platinum | 70,000^{^} |
| Canada (Music Canada) | Platinum | 100,000^{^} |
| United States (RIAA) | 2× Platinum | 2,000,000^{^} |
^{^} Shipments figures based on certification alone.

== Video album ==
Cherry Pie: Quality You Can Taste is the second video album from Warrant released in 1991. The video features backstage interviews, concert clips including a preview of the band's next album and the music videos from Cherry Pie.

1. "Cherry Pie"
2. "I Saw Red"
3. "Blind Faith"
4. "Uncle Tom's Cabin"
5. "I Saw Red" (acoustic version)
