= I Saw Red =

1990 single by Warrant

Single by Warrant

from the album Cherry Pie
- Released: November 1, 1990
- Recorded: 1990
- Genre: Glam metal
- Length: 3:47
- Label: Columbia
- Songwriter: Jani Lane

Warrant singles chronology
"Cherry Pie" (1990)	"I Saw Red" (1990)	"Uncle Tom's Cabin" (1991)

"I Saw Red (Acoustic)"

Single by Warrant

from the album The Best of Warrant
- Released: 1996
- Length: 3:45
- Songwriter: Jani Lane

"I Saw Red" is a power ballad by American glam metal band Warrant. It was released in November 1990 as the second single from Warrant's second album Cherry Pie. The song was one of Warrant's most successful singles, reaching number 10 on the Billboard Hot 100 in February 1991, number 14 on the Mainstream Rock Tracks chart and number 36 on the Australian charts and spawning two music videos.

== Background ==
The song was inspired by a true story of betrayal. It was written after Warrant lead vocalist Jani Lane had walked in on his girlfriend in bed with his best friend, resulting in Lane's nervous breakdown and the delayed release of the band's first record Dirty Rotten Filthy Stinking Rich.

== Acoustic ==
The Acoustic version of "I Saw Red" was released as the B-side from the single and features a music video with Jani Lane performing on his own. The acoustic version was released as a single in its own right and featured on the band's first compilation album The Best of Warrant.

== Tracklisting ==
No.	Title	Length
1.	"I Saw Red"	3:46
2.	"I Saw Red (Acoustic)"	3:45

== Charts ==
=== Weekly charts ===
Chart (1990–1991)	Peak position
Australia (ARIA)	36
Canada Top Singles (RPM)	17
US Billboard Hot 100	10
US Mainstream Rock (Billboard)	14

=== Year-end charts ===
Year-end chart (1991)	Position
US Top Pop Singles (Billboard)	96
