= Gladiator (1992 film) =

1992 sport film directed by Rowdy Herrington

- Theatrical release poster
- Directed by: Rowdy Herrington
- Screenplay by: Lyle Kessler; Robert Mark Kamen
- Story by: Djordje Milicevic; Robert Mark Kamen
- Produced by: Frank Price; Stephen J. Roth
- Starring: Cuba Gooding Jr.; James Marshall; Robert Loggia; Ossie Davis; Brian Dennehy
- Cinematography: Tak Fujimoto
- Edited by: Harry B. Miller III; Peter Zinner
- Music by: Brad Fiedel
- Production company: Price Entertainment
- Distributed by: Columbia Pictures
- Release date: March 5, 1992
- Running time: 101 minutes
- Country: United States
- Language: English
- Budget: $20 million
- Box office: $9.2 million

Gladiator is a 1992 American sports drama film directed by Rowdy Herrington, and starring Cuba Gooding Jr., James Marshall, Brian Dennehy and Robert Loggia. The film tells the story of Tommy Riley and Abraham "Lincoln" Haines, two teenagers trapped in the world of illegal underground boxing. Tommy is fighting to pay off gambling debts accumulated by his father John. Lincoln is fighting for the money to get out of the ghetto. While being exploited by boxing promoter Pappy Jack, the two teens become friends.

== Plot ==
Tommy Riley and his father John have just moved to start a new life. John has accumulated many gambling debts, but has found a new job that requires him to travel extensively, leaving Tommy alone at home. Tommy also struggles to fit in at school, having crossed gang members. He takes a job at a local diner and starts a romantic relationship with Dawn, the owner's daughter, but the gang members jump him outside the restaurant. Seeing how well Tommy is able to fight, local boxing promoter Pappy Jack offers Tommy a chance to fight in an illegal underground boxing operation. When two men arrive announcing that John owes a large sum of money in gambling debts, Jack convinces his boss, boxing promoter Jimmy Horn, to buy out the debt, forcing Tommy to pay it off by boxing.

Tommy enjoys great success and develops a friendship with Romano Essadro and Abraham "Lincoln" Haines, two fellow fighters. However, he continues to be harassed by gang members, and discovers that two of them, Black Death and Shortcut, are boxers who fight dirty, using elbows, kicks, knees, and low blows, and count on the crooked refs to overlook the clear violations. Tommy defeats Black Death in the ring, but Shortcut hides a fluid in his gloves and uses it to blind Romano during a match. Unable to defend himself, Romano is brutally beaten in the ring and is declared brain dead by doctors. Shortcut later tries the same trick on Tommy, but Tommy has learned to fight dirty, and defeats Shortcut.

Meanwhile, Lincoln shows signs of possible brain damage after narrowly defeating heavyweight fighter Wolfe and is told to quit fighting for at least 60 days or else suffer permanent brain damage. Despite this, Horn arranges a match between Lincoln and Tommy. Afraid of killing Lincoln, Tommy takes a beating until both are unwilling to continue. In revenge, Horn, a former boxer who retired with only one defeat, punches Lincoln severely enough to knock him out of the ring.

Furious, Tommy challenges Horn to a match. If Horn wins, Tommy will keep working for him indefinitely, but if Tommy wins, John's debt is wiped clean. Horn accepts on the condition that they fight bare-knuckle. Horn's vast boxing experience initially gives him the upper hand, and his confidence leads him to play with and humiliate Tommy. Tommy eventually uses the advice he has received throughout his brief boxing experience to outwit Horn. He fakes a broken hand to give Horn even more confidence, then uses surprise to defeat Horn, freeing himself from Horn's contract and shaking hands with Lincoln for the victory.

== Cast ==
- James Marshall as Tommy "The Bridgeport Bomber" Riley
- Cuba Gooding Jr. as Abraham "Lincoln" Haines
- Brian Dennehy as Jimmy Horn
- Robert Loggia as Pappy Jack
- Ossie Davis as Noah
- Cara Buono as Dawn
- Jon Seda as Romano Essadro
- Thomas Charles Simmons as Leo
- Debra Stipe as Charlene
- Jena Wynn as Laura Lee
- Lance Slaughter as Shortcut
- T.E. Russell as Leroy "Spits"
- Vonte Sweet as Tidbits
- Antoine Roshell as Scarface
- Jeon-Paul Griffin as Black Death
- Blake Dollard as Wolfe
- John Heard as John Riley
- Francesca P. Roberts as Miss Higgins
- Emily Marie Hooper as Belinda
- Laura Whyte as Millie
- Tak Fujimoto as Spectator (uncredited)
- Benny "The Jet" Urquidez as Spectator (uncredited)

== Production ==
Jon Seda made his debut on the film, auditioning for John G. Avildsen who was the original director. He was later called back for a screen test by Rowdy Herrington and was ultimately cast. He enjoyed working with Herrington, calling him a passionate director.

== Reception ==
The film received an indifferent reception from critics. On the review aggregator website Rotten Tomatoes, 31% of 13 critics' reviews are positive. Metacritic, which uses a weighted average, assigned the film a score of 49 out of 100, based on 19 critics, indicating "mixed or average" reviews.

== Soundtrack ==
A soundtrack containing a blend of hip-hop and rock music was released on February 25, 1992, by Columbia Records. It failed to make it to the Billboard 200 album chart, but Warrant's cover of "We Will Rock You" was a minor hit on the Billboard Hot 100, peaking at #83. The soundtrack also contained the last appearance by the rap group 3rd Bass. Jerry Goldsmith's unused score was released by Intrada Records in 2013, but none of Brad Fiedel's retained score appears on the 1992 album.

== See also ==
- List of boxing films
