= Sometimes She Cries =

Single by Warrant

from the album Dirty Rotten Filthy Stinking Rich
- Released: December 1989
- Recorded: 1988
- Genre: Glam metal
- Length: 4:44
- Label: Columbia
- Songwriter: Jani Lane

Warrant singles chronology
"Big Talk" (1989)	"Sometimes She Cries" (1989)	"Cherry Pie" (1990)

Sometimes She Cries is a song by American glam metal band Warrant. A power ballad, it was released in 1989 as the fourth single from Warrant's debut album Dirty Rotten Filthy Stinking Rich. The song charted at number 11 on the Mainstream Rock Tracks chart and number 20 on the Billboard Hot 100.

== Background ==
"Sometimes She Cries" is the second power ballad released from their debut album following the hit single Heaven; together, the two ballads sold the album to a wider, largely female audience. The song is a mix of gospel and classic rock. The music video is about a woman who has a child and her husband leaves her, Jani Lane sits on a wooden table and sings before being joined by the band behind him.

== Tracklisting ==
No.	Title	Length
1.	"Sometimes She Cries"	4:11
2.	"Ridin' High"	3:07

== Charts ==
Chart (1990)	Peak position
Canada Top Singles (RPM)	27
US Billboard Hot 100	20
US Mainstream Rock (Billboard)	11
