= Cherry Pie (Warrant song) =

1990 single by Warrant

Single by Warrant

from the album Cherry Pie
- B-side: "Thin Disguise"
- Released: August 1990
- Genre: Glam metal
- Length: 3:20 (album); 3:10 (Single)
- Label: Columbia
- Songwriter: Jani Lane
- Producer: Beau Hill

Warrant singles chronology
"Sometimes She Cries" (1990)	"Cherry Pie" (1990)	"I Saw Red" (1990)

Music videos
- "Cherry Pie" on YouTube

"Cherry Pie" is a song by the American glam metal band Warrant. It was released in late August 1990 as the lead single from the album of the same name. The song became a top-10 hit on the US Billboard Hot 100, reaching number 10, and also peaked at number six in Australia. The song has been cited by many as a quintessential "hair metal" anthem. In 2015, Sleazegrinder of Louder included the song in his list of "The 20 Greatest Hair Metal Anthems of All Time", placing it at number 16.

== Background and writing ==
"Cherry Pie" was a very late inclusion on the band's second album, which was originally going to be called Uncle Tom's Cabin. The president of Columbia Records, Don Ienner, wanted a rock anthem, so he called frontman Jani Lane (according to Lane, he wanted a song reminiscent of Aerosmith's "Love in an Elevator"), who wrote the song in about fifteen minutes. Guitarist Joey Allen stated that "the whole marketing and everything for that record changed. It was definitely driven by the label and not the band." The song, which was inspired by Def Leppard's "Pour Some Sugar on Me", which also happened to be a last-minute addition to that group's Hysteria album, was written down on a pizza box, which is now on display in the Hard Rock Cafe in Destin, Florida, as part of the Destin Commons. The guitar solo was played by C.C. DeVille as a favor to Lane, who was a long-time friend.

Many of the band members felt that "Cherry Pie" was not one of the better songs on the album, and see the song as a double-edged sword: it brought them fame, but many of their other songs are overshadowed by the major hit. On the third episode of VH1's HEAVY: The Story of Metal, "Looks That Kill", Lane expressed his regret for writing the song, stating that "I could shoot myself in the fucking head for writing that song." However, he later clarified that he had been under personal stress at the time of the VH1 interview, and had no ill feelings towards his association with the song:

Can I clear the air on that? They [VH1 producers] just caught me on a bad day. It was a bad moment—I was going through a divorce, my mom had just passed away, all this stuff was going on—and they sit me down in a chair and wanna start grilling me with questions, and I didn't wanna be there, so ... You know, push that interview to the side, I'm happy as a clam to have written a song that is still being played and still dug by so many people. It's hard enough to write a song, let alone one that sticks around.

== Music video ==
The video for "Cherry Pie" received heavy airplay on MTV and other music video stations. It featured the members of Warrant and a scantily clad woman (model Bobbie Brown) who is seen dancing throughout the video while the band members perform and make tongue-in-cheek references to the song's lyrics (for example, when the line referencing baseball is sung, Brown appears in a form-fitting baseball uniform, complete with a bat), all against a white background.

Canadian cable-TV music network MuchMusic refused to air the "Cherry Pie" video on the grounds that it was "offensively sexist". Director Jeff Stein defended the video saying it was a parody: "It's so over-the-top, how could anyone think it was anything but a spoof of other hair-metal videos, you know? If people think it was sexist, it was only sexist as a parody of sexism."

Brown became involved with Lane soon after the video was filmed, and married him in 1991.

Howard Johnson writing for Classic Rock ranked the song's video at No. 3 on their list of The Top 10 Best Hair Metal Videos.

== Alternate versions ==
"Cherry Pie" was re-visited by the band in 1999 on their Greatest & Latest album and was released as a promo and later iTunes single and was also released on several mixed compilation albums. In 2004, Lane recorded an acoustic version of "Cherry Pie", which featured on the second VH1 Classic Metal Mania: Stripped compilation. An electronic remix of "Cherry Pie" was released in 2015 by Lack Jemmon.

== Reception ==
Steve Lamacq of NME said, "Warrant, a nauseating, MTV cock rock band sound like a metal version of the J. Geils Band, trying to cover Joan Jett's 'I Love Rock 'n' Roll'."

== Charts ==
Chart (1990–91)	Peak position
Australia (ARIA)	6
Canada Top Singles (RPM)	57
New Zealand (Recorded Music NZ)	37
UK Singles (Official Charts)	35
US Billboard Hot 100	10
US Mainstream Rock (Billboard)	19

== Certifications ==
Region	Certification	Certified units/sales
New Zealand (RMNZ)	Gold	15,000^{‡}
Australia (ARIA)	Gold	35,000^{^}
United Kingdom (BPI)	Silver	200,000^{‡}
^{^} Shipments figures based on certification alone.^{‡} Sales+streaming figures based on certification alone.

== Release history ==
Region	Date	Format(s)	Label(s)	Ref.
United States	August 1990	—N/a	Columbia	
Japan	September 6, 1990	Mini-CD	CBS/Sony	
Australia	October 1, 1990	7-inch vinyl; CD; cassette	CBS	
United Kingdom	October 29, 1990	7-inch vinyl; 12-inch vinyl; CD	CBS	
