= Machine Gun (Warrant song) =

Single by Warrant

from the album Dog Eat Dog
- Released: September 9, 1992
- Genre: Heavy metal; glam metal
- Length: 3:45
- Label: Columbia
- Songwriter(s): Jani Lane

Warrant singles chronology
"We Will Rock You" (1992)	"Machine Gun" (1992)	"The Bitter Pill" (1992)

Machine Gun is a song by American rock band Warrant. The song was released in 1992 as the first single from Warrant's third album Dog Eat Dog. The song reached No. 36 on the Billboard Mainstream Rock Tracks chart.

== Background ==
"Machine Gun" was Warrant‘s heaviest single to this point and features a music video of the band performing in front of a metal corrugated wall. Clips of a woman being tattooed with the band animated on her body.

== Critical reception ==
Larry Flick, Billboard's reviewer, named this track as "their most aggressive single in some time". He wrote: "Producer Michael Wagener tightly weaves together intricate guitar leads, rumbling rhythm chords, and a well-shaded vocal by Jani Lane. May be too hard for fans at top 40, though album rockers will herald what is clearly the band's strongest entry to date".

== Track listing ==
No.	Title	Length
1.	"Machine Gun"	3:43
2.	"Inside Out"	3:12

== Charts ==
Chart (1992)	Peak position
Australia (ARIA)	124
US Mainstream Rock (Billboard)	36
