= Uncle Tom's Cabin (song) =

Single by Warrant

from the album Cherry Pie
- B-side: "Sure Feels Good To Me"
- Released: February 21, 1991
- Recorded: 1990
- Genre: Glam metal; heavy metal
- Length: 4:01
- Label: Columbia
- Songwriter: Jani Lane

Warrant singles chronology
"I Saw Red" (1991)	"Uncle Tom's Cabin" (1991)	"Blind Faith" (1991)

"Uncle Tom's Cabin" is a song by American glam metal band Warrant. It was released in February 1991 in Japan, and in the US in April 1991 as the third single from Warrant's second album Cherry Pie. The song charted at #78 on the Billboard Hot 100 and #19 on the Mainstream Rock Tracks chart. In Australia, the single peaked at #85 on the ARIA singles chart in May 1991.

A music video was made for the song, and later the song was re-visited by the band in 1999 on their Greatest & Latest album.

== Background ==
According to frontman Jani Lane, the original working title for the song was "I Know a Secret".

Prior to the writing of the song "Cherry Pie", the album's title and first single was to have been "Uncle Tom's Cabin", a track which foreshadowed the kind of imaginative song writing which would later be more fully revealed on the Dog Eat Dog record. Although named after the classic novel by Harriet Beecher Stowe, the song tells the story of a witness to the involvement of local police in a double murder.

== Track listing ==
No.	Title	Length
1.	"Uncle Tom's Cabin" (radio edit)	3:27
2.	"Sure Feels Good to Me"	2:38

== Charts ==
Chart performance for "Uncle Tom's Cabin"
Chart (1991)	Peak position
Australia (ARIA)	85
US Billboard Hot 100	78
US Mainstream Rock (Billboard)	19
