= Warrant (American band) =

American glam metal band

- From left to right: Steven Sweet, Jani Lane, Erik Turner, Joey Allen, Jerry Dixon

Background information
- Origin: Los Angeles, California, U.S.
- Genres: Glam metal; hard rock
- Works: Discography
- Years active: 1984–present
- Labels: Columbia; CMC; Down Boys; Cleopatra
- Members: Erik Turner; Jerry Dixon; Steven Sweet; Joey Allen; Robert Mason
- Past members: Jani Lane; Adam Shore; Max Asher; Josh Lewis; Alan Fischer; Chris Vincent; Scott Warren; Terry Ingram; David "Dave" White; Rick Steier; James Kottak; Danny Wagner; Bobby Borg; Vik "Vikki" Foxx; Mike Fasano; Keri Kelli; Billy Morris; Mike Morris; Timm Hamm; Shawn Zavodney; Kevan Phares; Jaime St. James; Brent Woods; Dan Conway; Michael Foster
- Website: warrantrocks.com

Warrant is an American glam metal band formed in 1984 in Hollywood, Los Angeles, that experienced success from 1989 to 1996, with five albums reaching international sales of over 10 million. The band first came into the national spotlight with their double platinum debut album Dirty Rotten Filthy Stinking Rich (1989) and one of its singles, "Heaven", which reached No. 1 in Rolling Stone and No. 2 on the Billboard Hot 100. The band's success continued in the early 1990s with the double platinum album Cherry Pie (1990), which provided the hit song of the same name.

Following the critically acclaimed gold album Dog Eat Dog (1992), the band started to experience frequent lineup changes, and despite a drop in popularity with the arrival of grunge, they released Ultraphobic in 1995 and a successful greatest hits album in 1996. The band changed their musical direction with the release of the grunge-influenced Belly to Belly in 1996, but returned to their roots very quickly by the end of the decade. The band experienced highs and lows in the 2000s with successful tours, a new covers album Under the Influence, lead singer Jani Lane leaving, a new album called Born Again with Black 'n Blue singer Jaime St. James and a brief reunion of the original lineup. In 2011, Jani Lane died of alcohol poisoning. The band is still recording music and performing, now with former Lynch Mob lead vocalist Robert Mason.

In 2013, The Houston Press named Warrant fourth on its list of "The 10 Worst Metal Bands of the '80s". Conversely, in 2020 Jeff Mezydlo of Yardbarker included them in his list of "the 20 greatest hair metal bands of all time", placing them sixth.

== History ==
=== Early years (1984–1987) ===
Warrant was formed in 1984 by high school drummer Max Asher (born Max Asher/Masursky), who also named the band. In addition to Asher, the original lineup included lead vocalist Adam Shore, guitarists Josh Lewis (born Josh Cohen) and Erik Turner, and bassist Chris Vincent, who was quickly replaced by Jerry Dixon. The band gigged all over California, opening for Hurricane, Ted Nugent, Stryper and Black 'n Blue among others. In September 1986, Shore and Asher quit to create Hot Wheelz. Later that month, Erik Turner was at a gig watching a band called Plain Jane who had become a regular feature in the Los Angeles club circuit, and, impressed by the band's songwriting and vocal performance, invited lead singer Jani Lane and drummer Steven Sweet (born Steven Chamberlin/Chamberlain) to jam with Warrant at Hollywood's db Sound in September 1986. Lane and Sweet, along with guitarist Joey Allen (born Joey Cagle), who replaced Lewis, completed the revamped lineup in 1987. The recruitment of Lane proved pivotal in the band's future, with the singer quickly assuming the role of songwriter.

After rising to fame on the Los Angeles club scene, the band recorded a demo tape in September 1987 for Paisley Park Records, a label owned by musician Prince. With other major labels taking an interest, and after recording tracks for A&M Records, Warrant also contributed to the soundtrack for Bill and Ted's Excellent Adventure. Eventually, it was announced that the band had signed with Columbia Records. Lane immediately spent his advance on a black Corvette, which he promptly crashed.

Warrant opened their tour in September, billed with D'MOLLS, followed by dates with Britny Fox. The label immediately arranged for them to work with in demand producer Beau Hill, on what would become the band's debut album.

=== Peak of popularity (1988–1993) ===
Warrant signed a contract with Columbia Records in January 1988, and in April they began recording their debut album Dirty Rotten Filthy Stinking Rich. Released on January 31, 1989, the record was a significant success, charting at number 10 on the Billboard 200. The album spawned four hit singles on the U.S. charts: the No. 2 power ballad "Heaven", the No. 20 Power Ballad "Sometimes She Cries", the No. 27 rock anthem "Down Boys", which is now Warrant's alias, and "Big Talk", which reached No. 30. Warrant became an instant hit, fitting perfectly among the popular big-hair glam metal bands of the era, and their music videos made much of their look. The band toured with Paul Stanley, Poison, Mötley Crüe, Queensrÿche, Cinderella and Kingdom Come, alongside copious MTV coverage.

The band was featured in Screamer Magazine several times before finally landing the cover of its June 1989 issue.

Warrant's first video album, Warrant: Live – Dirty Rotten Filthy Stinking Rich was released in 1990 on VHS and Laserdisc, featuring the band performing live in concert. The video was certified platinum

In 1990, the band then released their much anticipated second album Cherry Pie. Once more produced by Beau Hill, the album's title track was released as the first single and immediately was placed in the top 10 of the American singles chart. The album had tentatively been titled 'Uncle Tom's Cabin' after the original opening track. However, the label wanted an 'anthem' track, resulting in Lane coming up with "Cherry Pie" and the track becoming not only the lead cut but the album's title track. The video for the song employed model actress Bobbie Brown, whom Lane would later marry.

The album charted at No. 7 on The Billboard 200 and featured guest appearances by Poison's C.C. DeVille, Danger Danger's Bruno Ravel and Steve West, and Fiona. The album, which spawned the hit singles "Cherry Pie" (Featured in Guitar Hero II), "Uncle Tom's Cabin" (the acoustic intro was performed by Eric Oswald – Jani's brother), "Blind Faith" and "I Saw Red" which also reached the Top Ten in the United States, and three million copies of the album were sold.

The release of "Cherry Pie" was followed by a world tour with Poison, which ended in January 1991 after a conflict between the two bands over stage room. The band's European tour with David Lee Roth was cut short after Lane fractured several ribs in a stage dive in Birmingham, England. Warrant soon returned to touring, headlining shows in America on their 'Blood, Sweat And Beers' tour, supported by FireHouse and Trixter.

The band released their second video album Cherry Pie: Quality You Can Taste in 1991. The video features backstage interviews, concert clips including a preview of the band's next album and all the music videos from Cherry Pie.

In 1992, Warrant released their third album the critically acclaimed Dog Eat Dog. The record achieved only moderate commercial success compared with the first two albums, but still sold over 500,000 copies reaching Gold status and charting at No. 25 on the U.S. charts. While the record suffered poor sales performance in America, it was still considered as Warrant's strongest record, and a favorite among many devoted fans. The band snared a European touring slot, playing a number of shows on the "Monsters Of Rock" festival, headlined by Iron Maiden. The album featured the singles "Machine Gun", "The Bitter Pill", and "The Hole in my Wall".

Warrant also cut two tracks for the Gladiator movie in a cover version of Queen's anthem "We Will Rock You" and "The Power".

=== Changing times (1994–1999) ===
The 1990s were characterized by frequent changes to the band's lineup. Following their Dog Eat Dog world tour Lane temporarily left the band to start a solo career and the band was then dropped by Columbia, following the arrival of grunge and the death of Warrant's long-time manager Tom Hulett. In September 1993, Lane returned to the band and a short U.S. club tour commenced. In May 1994, guitarist Allen left Warrant and was followed by drummer Sweet in the following month. In November 1994, former Kingdom Come member, Rick Steier replaced Allen on guitar and fellow Kingdom Come alumnus James Kottak replaced Sweet on drums. Shortly thereafter, a new record deal was signed with Tom Lipsky of CMC Records in September 1994. A Japanese deal was signed with Pony Canyon Records at the same time.

The band's fourth album Ultraphobic was released in March 1995 and, although critically acclaimed, was not as successful as its predecessors, although CMC records reported the album moved over 200,000 copies worldwide. The new album (produced by a returning Beau Hill) saw Warrant acknowledging the grunge phenomenon with a record that openly admitted to a Seattle influence, although was still a natural progression from the hard edged Dog Eat Dog. The album featured the singles "Family Picnic", "Followed" and the ballad "Stronger Now" and the band went on tour again, touring America, Japan and Europe.

Drummer Kottak left the band in March 1996 and was replaced by Bobby Borg, formerly of Beggars & Thieves. The Best Of Warrant was the band's first compilation album released in 1996 which was good timing and sold well, featuring all of the hits from previous albums.

Adopting the official handle of WARRANT 96 (in order to signify the group's new musical direction), the group came up with their fifth studio album, the grunge infested Belly to Belly in October 1996. The record dispensed with the melodic rock niceties of previous works. The record was described by guitarist Steier as a "concept album" that follows a rags-to-riches-to-rags storyline concerning fame, fortune and the examination of one's value system once the spotlight fades.

Warrant released their first live compilation Warrant Live 86-97 in July 1997. It was recorded live at Harpos Concert Theatre, Detroit, Michigan on November 22, 1996. Warrant toured in 1997 opening for Alice Cooper in America alongside label mates Dokken and Slaughter. In October 1997, drummer Borg left the band to pursue a career as an author of several books including The Musicians Handbook, and was briefly replaced by touring drummer Vikki Foxx. The band was featured on the Rock Never Stops Tour in 1998. In 1999 Warrant released Greatest & Latest album featuring new re-recorded versions of some their classic songs and three new tracks.

=== Lane leaves, solo albums, new singer (2000–2007) ===
Guitarist Steier and keyboardist Danny Wagner (the latter of whom also performed drums) left the band in January 2000. Keri Kelli replaced Steier on guitars as a touring member and Mike Fasano became the newest in a long line of drummers. Keri Kelli and Mike Fasano had previously played together in Dad's Porno Mag. In August 2000, Kelli toured with Slash's Snakepit.

Warrant's next record was an album of cover versions, Under the Influence, released in May 2001, also featuring two new original tracks: "Subhuman" and "Face" Produced by Jerry Dixon. The band toured with Poison again in the summer of 2001, but the tour was cut short due to back injuries sustained by Poison bassist Bobby Dall.

Lane released his official debut solo album, Back Down to One, in 2002 through Z Records. It carried a "power pop" sound which was more closely aligned with the sound of Warrant than his unreleased Jabberwocky project. Shortly after the album's release Lane was admitted to a rehab center for alcohol and drug-related exhaustion.

The band again featured on the Rock Never Stops Tour in 2003 and in April 2003, Warrant replaced drummer Fasano with Kevan Phares.

Following rehab, Lane officially quit Warrant again in January 2004. After a few appearances on tribute compilations, Lane attempted to restart his own version of Warrant which would be stopped by legal action from his former bandmates.

Mike Fasano was briefly rehired in early 2004, before Steven Sweet rejoined the band. Joey Allen also rejoined in February 2004 and Lane was replaced with former Black N' Blue vocalist Jaime St. James.

Warrant released their seventh studio album entitled Born Again on February 4, 2006, with producer and engineer Pat Regan, who has previously worked with Ace Frehley, Deep Purple, Mr. Big and L.A. Guns. Music Videos were shot for all the songs on Born Again including the singles "Bourbon County Line" and "Dirty Jack", they appear on the DVD "Born Again: Delvis Video Diaries" along with behind the scenes footage, on tour clips and the making of the album. This was the first album to not feature Lane on lead vocals. On July 14, 2007, Warrant performed at the hard rock festival Rocklahoma.

=== Original lineup reunion (2008) ===
In January 2008, the band's agent, the William Morris Agency, issued a new photograph of the band with Lane prominently featured, confirming his return to the band for the 20 year anniversary. This version of the band was scheduled to play at Rocklahoma 2008. In March 2008, Warrant announced on its official website that it would co-headline with Cinderella on a summer reunion tour after Rocklahoma 2008. Ultimately, the tour was canceled after Cinderella singer Tom Keifer's left vocal cord hemorrhaged, making it impossible for him to sing in the immediate future. They had several shows outside of the Cinderella tour including 2 dates in Canada, Rocklahoma, and several in August.

On September 5, 2008, Jani Lane left Warrant and Robert Mason (ex-Lynch Mob) took over vocals. A statement from the band, published by Blabbermouth.net, said that:

It is with the deepest regret that we have to announce that Jani Lane will no longer be performing with Warrant. From the beginning of our reunion talks to the last note of our last show together in Houston this past weekend (on August 31 at the Rock the Bayou festival), we have had nothing but good intentions of bringing a quality original Warrant show to our fans and friends. We wish Jani nothing but the best and remain friends. We are very excited that we have found an unbelievable voice in Robert Mason (Lynch Mob). We have three dates confirmed, come out and judge for yourself… We don't think you will be disappointed!

On September 10, Rita Wilde's Rock Report confirmed that Jani Lane was out of Warrant due to song writing disagreements, but offered no further details on replacements or the band's future. Mason eventually agreed not only to finish the tour but also to become a permanent member of the band.

A compilation reunion DVD was released in late 2008 titled They Came From Hollywood.

=== Post Jani Lane (2009–2011) ===
In December 2010 Turner and Dixon appeared with longtime friend David Castagno on RadioScreamer to discuss Warrant's long and successful career as well as the band's next album plans.

On January 27, 2011, Allen announced that the bass and drums for fourteen songs for Warrant's next album had been completed, with the rhythm guitar parts for seven also completed.

The release of the new album, titled Rockaholic, on May 13, 2011, in Europe and May 17, 2011, in North America was confirmed by Frontiers Records. It subsequently peaked at number 22 on the Billboard Top Hard Rock Albums chart. The album features two new music videos for the singles: "Life's a Song" and "Home".

The Rockaholic Tour of Canada and the U.S. with labelmates Whitesnake as well as Cinderella and fellow Sunset Strip Kings Poison, had Warrant playing over 50 dates in support of the album.

=== Death of Jani Lane (2011) ===
On Thursday evening, August 11, 2011, the Los Angeles Police Department announced that Jani Lane, 47, former lead singer (1986–2004, 2008), had been found dead. It was confirmed that Lane was officially pronounced dead by fire department personnel who responded to a call shortly before 5:30 p.m. at a Comfort Inn hotel on the 20100 block of Ventura Boulevard in Woodland Hills, California. Lane died of acute alcohol poisoning.

A public memorial concert for Lane – with performances by fellow metal rock bands, including Great White, Slammin' Gladys, Quiet Riot and L.A. Guns — was held on Monday, August 29, 2011, at the Key Club in Hollywood, California.

=== Recent events (2012–present) ===
In 2016, Warrant guitarist Allen announced that the band intended to enter a recording studio in the fall (possibly in Nashville or Los Angeles) to begin its follow up to 2011's Rockaholic. The band already had nine new songs fully demoed and another 20 ideas "floating around".

On May 12, 2017, Warrant released their ninth studio album, Louder Harder Faster. The album features a remake of the classic Merle Haggard song "I Think I'll Just Stay Here and Drink" as the first single and the 'Professional Bull Riders' new "party anthem". The official video premiered at an official kickoff party at St Louis in Ballpark Village on February 25, accompanied by a live performance. The clip was filmed in Anaheim. The band also released the single and music video for the album's title track "Louder Harder Faster" on May 4, 2017. The album charted at No. 19 on the Billboard Top Independent Albums chart. Currently, Robbie Crane is playing bass for Warrant on the first few shows coming back from COVID-19 freeze on live shows.

== Musical style ==
AllMusic has Warrant tagged as glam metal, hard rock and pop metal. During live performances, the band members would wear matching outfits with their names embroidered on the sleeves. They would also incorporated choreographed dance moves into their live set. American digital media website Yardbarker said the band "knew how to follow a formula" and that they "milked every ounce of MTV's obsession with hair metal, it's almost as if [they were] the boy band of the movement." The Houston Press called the band's radio singles "goofy".

== Band members ==
Current members

- Erik Turner – guitar, backing vocals, harmonica (1984–present) (Note: Turner was absent from Warrant for periods during 1997–1998, May 2003, and mid 2024–early 2025.)
- Jerry Dixon – bass guitar, backing vocals (1984–present) (Note: Dixon has been sporadically absent since 2021, when shows started again after the COVID-19 freeze on live shows.)
- Steven Sweet – drums, percussion, backing vocals, harmonica (1986–1994, 2004–present)
- Joey Allen – lead guitar, backing vocals, banjo, harmonica (1987–1994, 2004–present) (Note: Allen missed one show on 10/11/2025, in Cedar Park, TX.)
- Robert Mason – lead vocals, additional guitar (2008–present)

Touring substitutes

- Robbie Crane – bass guitar, backing vocals (2019, 2021–present)
- James Kloeppel – keyboards, backing vocals (touring member 2023–present); guitar (touring substitute 2024–2025); lead guitar (touring substitute 2025)

== Discography ==
Studio albums

- Dirty Rotten Filthy Stinking Rich (1989)
- Cherry Pie (1990)
- Dog Eat Dog (1992)
- Ultraphobic (1995)
- Belly to Belly (1996)
- Under the Influence (2001)
- Born Again (2006)
- Rockaholic (2011)
- Louder Harder Faster (2017)

== Tours ==
- D.R.F.S.R. Tour (1989)
- Cherry Pie World Tour (1990–1991)
- Blood, Sweat & Beers Tour (1991)
- Dog Eat Dog World Tour (Hair of the Dog Tour) (1992–1993)
- Club Tour (1994)
- Radio or Not, Here We Come (Ultraphobic) (1995)
- Belly to Belly Tour (1996–1997)
- Rock Never Stops Tour (1998)
- Under the Influence Summer tour (2001)
- Metal Edge Rockfest Tour (2002)
- Rock Never Stops Tour (2003)
- Born Again Tour (2007)
- Reunion Tour (2008)
- Summer Tour (2009)
- Rockaholic Tour (2011)
- Cherry Pie 21st Anniversary Tour (2012)
- Louder, Harder Faster Tour (2017–2018)
- Dirty 30 Tour (2019)
- Cherry Pie 30th Anniversary Tour (2020-2022)
- Let the Good Times Rock Tour (2022-2025)
- Turn Up The Good Times Tour (Present)
