= Dirty Rotten Filthy Stinking Rich =

1989 debut album by Warrant

- Original album artwork by Mark Ryden

Studio album by Warrant
- Released: January 31, 1989
- Recorded: April–November 1988
- Genre: Glam metal
- Length: 37:08
- Label: Columbia
- Producer: Beau Hill

Warrant chronology
Dirty Rotten Filthy Stinking Rich (1989)	Cherry Pie (1990)

Singles from Dirty Rotten Filthy Stinking Rich
- 1. "Down Boys" Released: April 1989; 2. "Heaven" Released: July 1989; 3. "Big Talk" Released: October 1989; 4. "Sometimes She Cries" Released: December 1989

Dirty Rotten Filthy Stinking Rich is the debut studio album by American glam metal band Warrant, released on January 31, 1989.

The album was highly successful, spawning the hit singles "Heaven" (No. 2, 1989), "Down Boys" (No. 27, 1989) and "Sometimes She Cries" (No. 20, 1990). The album peaked at number 10 on the Billboard 200.

The unique cover art features a painting by Mark Ryden, meant to depict a business psychopath.

== Musical style ==
The album's sound is typical of the Sunset Strip glam metal scene of the 1980s, featuring heavy guitars and melodic, catchy choruses.

== Production and marketing ==
During the recording of the album, singer Jani Lane walked in on his best friend in bed with his girlfriend, leading to his nervous breakdown, and its release was delayed by several months while Lane recovered. These events would later be recounted in the single "I Saw Red" on the band's following album, Cherry Pie.

The record was produced and engineered by Beau Hill, who also contributed keyboards and backing vocals. It was recorded at The Enterprise in Burbank, California.

=== Guitar solos dispute ===
While all sources agree session musician Mike Slamer contributed guitar to the album, there is debate as to his extent.

It was widely rumored that Warrant's guitarists Erik Turner and Joey Allen had not played a note on the album, and that all guitar work had been performed by Mike Slamer (formerley of Streets). Slamer's wife confirmed in 1998 that her husband played guitar on the record. Mike Slamer has stated in interviews that he played guitar and the lead solos on the album. Producer Beau Hill stated in a 2012 interview that Slamer did in fact play on the album. Hill had said to the band that the "songs are really great, but I think we’re a little weak in the solo department and so [I'd] like to bring somebody in". Hill also stated that "everybody in the band signed off on it and everything was done above ground".

Producer Beau Hill felt Joey Allen and Erik Turner were not skilled enough musicians to record all the guitar parts on the album, and claimed Slamer played all the guitar solos.

However, in September 2020, Erik Turner was interviewed on the Chuck Shute podcast and stated Turner, Allen and Slamer played on the tracks and also claimed Slamer performed some of the solos. In June 2022, Allen was interviewed on the subject and identified which musicians performed which guitar parts. Some songs were entirely Slamer, while others were a mix of the three and some entirely performed by Allen.

Allen states Hill wasn't particularly helpful during recording sessions with himself and Turner. Allen claimed Hill required the band's guitarists to record "bone dry," or without effects, while allowing Slamer effects which enhanced his performances. Allen also confirms taking guitar lessons from Slamer, even after the completion of the record.

== Songs ==
The album's themes, which include materialism ("32 Pennies", "D.R.F.S.R"), sex ("Down Boys", "So Damn Pretty", "Cold Sweat"), heartbreak ("Heaven") and loneliness ("Sometimes She Cries"), would be echoed on later Warrant releases.

The debut single from the band was "Down Boys", the song has been described as "one of the toughest, heaviest songs in [Warrant's] catalog, and certainly at the top of both categories in terms of their hit singles".

The second single was the smash hit "Heaven" which took Warrant's record company by surprise. Indeed, once the widespread appeal of the song became apparent, the band was instructed to re-record the track to lend it a "bigger radio sound". Beau Hill remixed the song for the single release. The first 250,000 copies of the record featured the original version while later pressings featured a new version. "Heaven" had previously been recorded by Jani Lane and Steven Sweet's old band Plain Jane.

"Big Talk" was released as the third single followed by the popular "Sometimes She Cries" as the fourth single. All the singles featured music videos.

== Reception ==
Professional ratings
Review scores
Source	Rating
AllMusic	4/5 stars
Kerrang!	3/5 stars
Los Angeles Times	3/4 stars

The Los Angeles Times called Dirty Rotten Filthy Stinking Rich "a rock 'n' roll romp that's both colorful and loaded with heart."

AllMusic gave the album a rating of four out of five stars, saying that it was "sleek and clean, built on processed guitars and cavernous drums" and that it "sounds exactly like that year [1989], both for better and worse." Dave Reynolds of Kerrang! considers the album "hardly outstanding", with only "a bunch of distinctly average songs matched to a brace of worthwhile moments".

== Track listing ==
All tracks are written by Jani Lane.

No.	Title	Length
1.	"32 Pennies"	3:09
2.	"Down Boys"	4:04
3.	"Big Talk"	3:43
4.	"Sometimes She Cries"	4:44
5.	"So Damn Pretty (Should Be Against the Law)"	3:33
6.	"D.R.F.S.R."	3:17
7.	"In the Sticks"	4:06
8.	"Heaven"	3:57
9.	"Ridin' High"	3:06
10.	"Cold Sweat"	3:32
Total length:		37:08

Bonus tracks
No.	Title	Length
11.	"Only a Man" (demo)	4:22
12.	"All Night Long" (demo)	2:42

== Personnel ==
Warrant

- Jani Lane – lead vocals, acoustic guitar
- Joey Allen – lead guitar
- Erik Turner – rhythm guitar
- Jerry Dixon – bass
- Steven Sweet – drums

Additional personnel

- Mike Slamer – guitar solos on some tracks
- Beau Hill – keyboards, backing vocals
- Bekka Bramlett – backing vocals

Production

- Beau Hill – producer, engineer, mixing (5, 7, 10)
- Joel Stoner – engineer
- John Jansen – mixing (except 5, 7, 10)

== Charts ==
Chart (1989)	Peak position
Australian Albums (Kent Music Report)	72
Canada Top Albums/CDs (RPM)	20
US Billboard 200	10

== Certifications ==
Region	Certification	Certified units/sales
Canada (Music Canada)	Platinum	100,000^{^}
United States (RIAA)	2× Platinum	2,000,000^{^}
^{^} Shipments figures based on certification alone.

== Video Album ==
Live - Dirty Rotten Filthy Stinking Rich

Video by Warrant
- Released: 16 January 1990
- Recorded: Bucksley Arena, Tampa, Florida, 1989
- Genre: Glam metal
- Length: 53 min.
- Label: Columbia
- Director: Nick Morris
- Producer: Fiona O'Mahoney

Warrant chronology
Live - Dirty Rotten Filthy Stinking Rich (1990)	Cherry Pie: Quality You Can Taste (1991)

Warrant: Live - Dirty Rotten Filthy Stinking Rich is the first Warrant video album released in 1990 on VHS and Laserdisc, featuring the band performing live in concert on the D.R.F.S.R tour in 1989. The video features the album cover character (calling himself "Cashly Guido Bucksley") watching Warrant in concert. The video was certified platinum.

=== Track listing ===
1. "So Damn Pretty"
2. "Ridin' High"
3. "32 Pennies"
4. "Heaven" (music video)
5. "Down Boys"
6. "Cold Sweat"
7. "D.R.F.S.R."
8. "Sometimes She Cries"
9. "Big Talk" (music video)

=== Certifications ===
Region	Certification	Certified units/sales
United States (RIAA)	Platinum	100,000^{^}
^{^} Shipments figures based on certification alone.
