= Down Boys =

Single by Warrant

from the album Dirty Rotten Filthy Stinking Rich
- B-side: "Cold Sweat"
- Released: April 1989
- Recorded: 1988
- Genre: Glam metal
- Length: 4:04
- Label: Columbia
- Songwriter(s): Jani Lane
- Producer(s): Beau Hill

Warrant singles chronology
"Down Boys" (1989)	"Heaven" (1989)

"Down Boys" is the first single by the American rock band Warrant. It was released in 1989 from Warrant's first album, Dirty Rotten Filthy Stinking Rich. The song reached #27 on the Billboard Hot 100 chart and #13 on the Mainstream Rock Tracks chart.

== Music video ==
"Down Boys", which became the band's nickname, featured the band's debut music video. The video was placed on The New York Times list of the "15 Essential Hair-Metal Videos".

== Review ==
The song has been described as "one of the toughest, heaviest songs in [Warrant's] catalog, and certainly at the top of both categories in terms of their hit singles". The song was re-recorded by the band in 1999 on its Greatest & Latest album.

== Charts ==
Chart (1989)	Peak position
New Zealand (Recorded Music NZ)	50
US Billboard Hot 100	27
US Mainstream Rock (Billboard)	13
