= Heaven (Warrant song) =

Single by Warrant

from the album Dirty Rotten Filthy Stinking Rich
- B-side: "In the Sticks"
- Released: July 1989
- Genre: Glam metal
- Length: 3:57
- Label: Columbia
- Songwriter: Jani Lane
- Producer: Beau Hill

Warrant singles chronology
"Down Boys" (1989)	"Heaven" (1989)	"Big Talk" (1989)

"Heaven" is a song by American glam metal band Warrant. The power ballad was released in July 1989 as the second single from Warrant's debut album, Dirty Rotten Filthy Stinking Rich. The song is Warrant's most commercially successful single, spending two weeks at number two on the US Billboard Hot 100 and number three on the Billboard Album Rock Tracks chart. The track's commercial success has led it to becoming one of the best known songs by the band.

== Background ==
"Heaven" took Warrant's record company by surprise. Indeed, once the widespread appeal of the song became apparent, the band was instructed to re-record the track to lend it a "bigger radio sound". The first 250,000 copies of the record featured the original version while later pressings featured a new version. The song had previously been recorded by Jani Lane and Steven Sweet's old band Plain Jane.

== Music video ==
The music video starred Scottish model Tracy Allan. It was filmed during a live concert at Sandstone Amphitheater in Kansas City, Kansas and at other locations around the Kansas City Metro area as well as New York City.

== Alternate versions ==
"Heaven" was re-visited by the band in 1999 on their Greatest & Latest album and was released as a promo single and later on iTunes. The song was also released on several mixed compilation albums. In 2004, Jani Lane re-recorded an acoustic version of "Heaven" which appeared on the VH1 Classic Metal Mania: Stripped compilations.

== Charts ==
=== Weekly charts ===
Chart (1989)	Peak position
Australia (ARIA)	54
Canada Top Singles (RPM)	5
Norway (VG-lista)	4
UK Singles (Official Charts)	93
US Billboard Hot 100	2
US Mainstream Rock (Billboard)	3

=== Year-end charts ===
Chart (1989)	Position
Canada Top Singles (RPM)	34
US Billboard Hot 100	15
US Album Rock Tracks (Billboard)	22

== Certifications ==
Region	Certification	Certified units/sales
United States (RIAA)	Gold	500,000^{^}
Canada (Music Canada)	Gold	50,000^{^}
^{^} Shipments figures based on certification alone.
