= Dog Eat Dog (Warrant album) =

Studio album by Warrant
- Released: August 25, 1992
- Recorded: February–April 1992
- Studios: Scream Studios (Studio City, Los Angeles)
- Genres: Heavy metal; hard rock; glam metal
- Length: 46:38
- Label: Columbia
- Producer: Michael Wagener

Warrant chronology
Cherry Pie (1990)	Dog Eat Dog (1992)	Ultraphobic (1995)

Singles from Dog Eat Dog
- 1. "Machine Gun" Released: September 1992; 2. "The Bitter Pill" Released: November 1992; 3. "The Hole in My Wall" Released: 1992; 4. "Inside Out" Released: 1992

Professional ratings
Review scores
Source	Rating
Allmusic	3/5 stars
Entertainment Weekly	B+
Q	4/5 stars

Dog Eat Dog is the third studio album by American glam metal band Warrant. It was released on August 25, 1992, on the Columbia label of Sony Music, and was their final album for the label. The album peaked at number 25 on The Billboard 200. It is also the last album to feature all five original members, as Joey Allen and Steven Sweet both left the band in 1994, but returned in 2004.

== Production and marketing ==
Warrant began recording bass and drums for Dog Eat Dog in Los Angeles, in February 1992. Overdubs were recorded at Morrisound Studios in Tampa, Florida, in March 1992. The record was mixed in at Scream Studios in Studio City, California, in April 1992 with producer Michael Wagener.

Apparently conscious of the widely circulated rumour that Joey Allen and Erik Turner had not played on the first two Warrant records, the band had Wagener include a statement in the liner notes that "no artist, except those listed, performed on this album in any capacity whatsoever". Jani Lane wrote in the liner notes: "This album is dedicated to Joey Allen, one of the most under-rated guitarists in rock today."

Shortly after the release of the album, Lane discovered that a large, framed poster of Warrant had been removed from the foyer in Columbia Records in Los Angeles and replaced with a poster of the label's newest signed act, Seattle band Alice in Chains. It was at this moment, according to Lane, that he realized that "the proverbial writing [was] on the wall" for the band. In the absence of support from the band's label, limited airplay from either radio or MTV, and with no budget for a major tour to support the record, sales of the album were sluggish compared to the first two albums. Nevertheless, Dog Eat Dog eventually achieved "gold" status in the United States and was regarded by critics as Warrant's strongest record.

== Songs ==
The song "Machine Gun" was the album's first single and featured a music video.

The song "Bitter Pill" which was the second single features an operatic interlude, performed in German by the "Moron Fish & Tackle Choir". The makeshift "Choir" consisted of security guards, engineers, janitors, and others who had been available at or near the recording studio. The song features two different music videos, one with the album version of the song featuring the whole band in the video and one with the acoustic version of the song featuring only Jani Lane in the video. The video for the acoustic version was shot solely outside St Vincent de Paul Church located at 621 West Adams Blvd in South Los Angeles (intersection of West Adams and Figueroa). The Popeyes Restaurant seen across the street in the video still exists today.

"The Hole in My Wall" featuring the use of a talkbox, was released as the third single of the album.

"Inside Out" often used as a concert intro was also released as a single and “Andy Warhol Was Right” was released as a promo single.

"Sad Theresa" had previously been recorded by Jani Lane and Steven Sweet's old band Plain Jane.

== Track listing ==
All tracks are written by Jani Lane.

No.	Title	Length
1.	"Machine Gun"	3:45
2.	"The Hole in My Wall"	3:30
3.	"April 2031"	5:05
4.	"Andy Warhol Was Right"	3:37
5.	"Bonfire"	4:21
6.	"The Bitter Pill"	4:07
7.	"Hollywood (So Far, So Good)"	3:47
8.	"All My Bridges Are Burning"	3:37
9.	"Quicksand"	3:58
10.	"Let It Rain"	4:16
11.	"Inside Out"	3:40
12.	"Sad Theresa"	3:25
Total length:		46:38

Japanese edition bonus track
No.	Title	Length
13.	"Lincolns, Mercurys and Fords"	2:30

== Personnel ==
- Jani Lane - vocals, arranger
- Joey Allen - lead guitar
- Erik Turner - rhythm guitar, arrangement
- Jerry Dixon - bass
- Steven Sweet - drums

Additional personnel

- Scott Warren - keyboards

== Charts ==
Chart (1992)	Peak position
Australian Albums (ARIA)	105
Japanese Albums (Oricon)	26
UK Albums (Official Charts)	74
US Billboard 200	25

== Certifications ==
Region	Certification	Certified units/sales
United States (RIAA)	Gold	500,000^{^}
^{^} Shipments figures based on certification alone.
