= Jani Lane =

American rock singer (1964–2011)

- Lane circa 1989
- Born: John Kennedy Oswald; February 1, 1964; Akron, Ohio, U.S
- Died: August 11, 2011 (aged 47); Los Angeles, California, U.S.
- Occupations: Singer, songwriter
- Years active: 1982–2011
- Spouse(s): Bobbie Brown (m. 1991; div. 1993) Rowanne Brewer (m. 1996; div. 2005) Kimberly Nash (m. 2011)
- Children: 2
- Musical career
- Genres: Glam metal; hard rock; heavy metal
- Formerly of: Warrant; Saints of the Underground

Jani Lane (/ˈdʒeɪni/ JAY-nee; born John Kennedy Oswald; February 1, 1964 – August 11, 2011) was an American singer and the lead vocalist, frontman, lyricist and main songwriter for the glam metal band Warrant. From Hollywood, California, the band experienced success from 1989 to 1996 with five albums reaching international sales of over 10 million. Lane left Warrant in 2004 and again in 2008 after a brief reunion. Lane also released a solo album, Back Down to One, in 2003, and the album Love the Sin, Hate the Sinner with a new group, Saints of the Underground, in 2008. Lane contributed lead vocals and songwriting to various projects throughout his career.

== Early life and career ==
Lane was born John Kennedy Oswald (later changed to John Patrick Oswald), on February 1, 1964, in Akron, Ohio to Robert and Eileen Oswald. He was raised in Brimfield with four older siblings: sisters Marcine Williams, Michelle Robinson and Victoria Ley, plus older brother Eric, already an accomplished guitarist. With sisters Micki and Vicky and brother Eric harmonizing and playing guitar, Lane taught himself to play drums, guitar and piano by ear by age five. He grew up listening to Cleveland rock station WMMS (100.7 FM "The Buzzard") and was introduced to a variety of music by his older siblings.

With connections from his brother Eric around the music scene (and with his parents' help), Lane made a name for himself at a very young age. He played drums under the pseudonym "Mitch Dynamite" in clubs by age 11 especially with a local band "Pokerface." By that time, his siblings had left for college or marriage. Lane's father "Ozzie" continued to network with local bands and club owners to help promote Jani's musical talent in pursuit of his dream. Lane graduated from Field High School in Brimfield in 1982.

Lane is credited as the vocalist/drummer on Warrant's Latest and Greatest CD. Throughout his career, Lane would sometimes play drums/acoustic guitar and piano with his band and played the drums in various formats and gigs with other musicians.

== Career ==
=== Early years ===
After high school, Lane joined the band Cyren, featuring vocalist Skip Hammonds, guitarist John Weakland, bassist Don Hoover (and later Rusty Fohner) with Lane on drums and vocals. Many of Cyren's shows opened for a popular local band called Risqué. When Risqué's bassist, Al Collins, noticed Lane's vocal talents, he convinced Lane to form a new band they eventually called Dorian Gray. The new band also included Steven Chamberlin on drums and Dave Chamberlin on lead guitar. Dorian Gray was designed to have Lane as the lead vocalist and to perform original material, but Lane wasn't ready to be the lead singer and quickly returned to the drum kit. Billy Denmead was hired as lead vocalist and rhythm guitarist. After only a few shows, Collins left the band, vowing to put a band together when Lane was ready to be a lead vocalist.

Lane moved to Florida in 1983 with Dorian Gray. Eventually deciding to assume a lead vocalist role, he formed Plain Jane with Collins and Chamberlin, adopting the stage name "Jani Lane" (Chamberlin would also soon rechristen himself Steven Sweet). He took the name "Jani" from his German grandparents, who spelled his name "Jani" and pronounced it "Yay-nee." Lane began vocal training with vocal coach/trainer Ron Feldmann, who introduced him to Creative Engineering, Inc. in Orlando. Lane worked there as a programmer of the animatronic character Dook LaRue, the drummer for The Rock-afire Explosion. His vocal debut was at The Station in Fern Park, Florida.

Lane, Collins, and Chamberlin were now going by the band name Plain Jane, and recorded their first four-track demos at their rented house in Winter Park, Florida. Although reluctant to leave Florida, they rented a trailer in the spring of 1984 and moved to California with hopes of landing a record deal. They were broke by the time they landed at the Hollywood Bowl Motel and resorted to making sandwiches with mustard packets while taking turns calling their parents for cash.

Struggling to make ends meet as a musician, Lane resorted to working in a pornographic video warehouse. The band, along with a new road crew and a few girlfriends, pooled their wages and lived in a two-bedroom condominium rented by new Plain Jane guitarist Paul Noble. At one time, there were 13 people living in the crowded space.

By 1985, Plain Jane had become a regular feature on the Los Angeles club circuit and opened many shows for a band called Warrant. Plain Jane's bassist and guitarist both left the band on the same day Warrant's singer and drummer quit. Erik Turner, who had founded Warrant in July 1984, was impressed by Plain Jane's songwriting and vocal performance and invited Lane and Sweet to jam with his band at Hollywood's db Sound in September 1986.

=== Warrant ===
After generating notoriety on the club circuit, Warrant began to attract the attention of record labels. Following an abortive deal with A&M Records over a contribution to the soundtrack for the motion picture Bill & Ted's Excellent Adventure, the band signed with Columbia Records. The Columbia deal came via the partnering of Warrant and manager Tom Hulett, known for working with The Beach Boys, Elvis Presley, The Moody Blues and others. Hulett became Lane's mentor and friend until Hulett's death from cancer in 1993.

As lead vocalist with Warrant, Lane wrote all of the material for the band's 1989 debut double platinum album, Dirty Rotten Filthy Stinking Rich, including four Top 40 hit singles: "Down Boys", "Sometimes She Cries", "Big Talk" and the No. 2 Billboard Hot 100 hit "Heaven." The album peaked at no. 10 on The Billboard 200. Lane also wrote four Top 40 hit singles ("Cherry Pie," "I Saw Red," "Uncle Tom's Cabin" and "Blind Faith") for the second album, the 1990 double platinum Cherry Pie, which peaked at no. 7 on the Billboard 200. Lane also co-wrote and performed with Warrant the song "The Power" in the 1992 movie Gladiator. In 1992, Warrant released Dog Eat Dog, their gold third album, which peaked at no. 25 on the Billboard 200.

Lane left Warrant in March 1993 to pursue a solo career. He returned six months later, helping the band secure a new record with Tom Lipsky of CMC International. Warrant recorded Ultraphobic in 1995, Belly to Belly in 1996, Greatest & Latest in 1999 and a cover album, Under the Influence, in 2001.

Due to personal and business disagreements, Lane left Warrant again in 2004. In January 2008, the band's agent, the William Morris Agency, issued a new photograph of the band with Lane prominently featured, confirming his return to the band. It was the first time that all original members had been in the band since 1993. The band's first show with all original members was in May 2008 in Nashville, Tennessee. Warrant performed a series of shows during the summer of 2008, but by September, the band and Lane agreed to move forward separately due to "too much water under the bridge." Warrant and Lane both continued to perform Lane's compositions live and Lane continued to write for himself and other artists.

=== Solo career ===
In 1993, Lane started working on his first solo project. Titled "Jabberwocky," the album represented a significant musical departure from previous work. Between 1997 and 2000, demos of Lane's solo material began surfacing on the Internet, with some bids on eBay reaching an estimated $100 per copy. In 2002, Lane decided to postpone the "Jabberwocky" project and released a new project as his debut solo album. The "Jabberwocky" project remained unreleased.

Lane's official debut solo album, Back Down to One, was released on June 17, 2003, through Z Records and in the U.S. in 2006 on Immortal/Sidewinder Records. It carried a "power pop" sound more closely aligned with the sound of Warrant than "Jabberwocky." Shortly after the album's release, Lane was admitted to a rehabilitation center for alcohol and drug-related exhaustion.

In August 2004, Lane withdrew from the Bad Boys of Metal tour after only eight shows.

In the fall of 2004, Lane contributed lead vocals for the first ever theme song to a novel, Billy McCarthy's "The Devil of Shakespeare," along with James Young from Styx, Ron Flynt of 20/20 and Chip Z'Nuff of Enuff Z'Nuff.

Lane contributed vocals on the track "Bastille Day" and "2112 Overture/Temples of Syrinx" for the Magna Carta 2005 Rush tribute album "Subdivisions."

Lane had success with the "VH1 Classic Metal Mania: Stripped" discs, where the acoustic version of "I Saw Red" was included on disc 1, a new acoustic swinging version of "Cherry Pie" featured on disc 2, and a new acoustic version of "Heaven" featured on disc 3.

In 2005, Lane became a fan favorite on the popular VH1 series Celebrity Fit Club 2. His problems with alcohol were highlighted and many viewers supported his efforts at recovery.

With the reissue and U.S. release of "Back Down to One" in 2006, Lane attempted to restart his version of Warrant. Although "Back Down to One" was credited as a solo release, Lane assembled a new touring band called "Jani Lane's Warrant." The band's first shows in Michigan were stopped by legal action from former bandmates objecting to his use of the Warrant logo on his posters. Lane subsequently continued touring without the Warrant name and logo.

Lane lent his vocals to numerous tribute CDs during the 2000s. In 2007, he released a solo cover album titled "Photograph," featuring a collection of his tribute contributions.

Keri Kelli and Lane wrote a song for Alice Cooper titled "The One That Got Away." It was recorded by Cooper on his 2008 record Along Came a Spider. Lane also finished work on a side project, Saints of the Underground, which included Kelli and Bobby Blotzer and Robbie Crane, (both from Ratt). Their album, Love the Sin, Hate the Sinner, was released on April 22, 2008, by Warrior Records, and was mixed by producer/engineer Andy Johns, who'd worked with The Rolling Stones and Led Zeppelin. The album featured additional bass work by Chuck Wright (Quiet Riot, House of Lords). The band was originally called "Angel City Outlaws" when they posted their first two promo singles, "Bruised" and "Exit."

In summer 2010, Lane toured with Great White, filling in for singer Jack Russell, who was recuperating from surgery after suffering internal complications.

== In media ==
Lane became involved in acting in the early 1990s. He made a brief appearance in Caged Fear and appeared in High Strung in 1991.

== Personal life ==
During the shooting of Warrant's "Cherry Pie" video, Lane met model Bobbie Brown, who starred in the video, and they married in July 1991. They had a daughter, Taylar, in 1992 and divorced in 1993. Their relationship was recounted in Brown's 2013 autobiography, Dirty Rocker Boys, co-written with Caroline Ryder. In 1996, Lane married actress Rowanne Brewer, a former Miss Maryland USA. They had a daughter, Madison, in 1997 and divorced in 2005. In 2011, Lane married his third wife, Kimberly Nash.

== Death ==
On August 11, 2011, the Los Angeles Police Department and local news stations announced that Lane was found dead of acute alcohol poisoning at a Comfort Inn hotel in Woodland Hills, California at the age of 47. Lane was pronounced dead by fire department personnel who responded to a call shortly before 5:30 p.m.

A public memorial concert with performances by Great White, Quiet Riot, Enuff Z'Nuff, Dario, and L.A. Guns was held on August 29 at the Key Club in Hollywood.

In 2011, a biopic titled Cherry Pie Guy about Lane's life was announced. Radio personality and comedian Jeff Dandurand was said to portray Jani and also direct the film. As of 2022, the film was still in development and was expected to start filming in 2023.

== Discography ==
=== Studio albums ===
- Back Down to One (2003)
- Catch a Falling Star (2015)

=== with Warrant ===
- Dirty Rotten Filthy Stinking Rich (1989)
- Cherry Pie (1990)
- Dog Eat Dog (1992)
- Ultraphobic (1995)
- Belly to Belly (1996)
- Greatest & Latest (1999)
- Under the Influence (2001)

=== with Saints of the Underground ===
- Love the Sin, Hate the Sinner (2008)

=== Guest appearances ===
- 1991 Voices That Care (Various) U.S. #11, U.S. AC #6 CAN #61
- 1998 Forever Mod: Portrait of a Storyteller – Tribute to Rod Stewart: "I Was Only Joking"
- 1999 Not The Same Old Song And Dance – A Tribute to Aerosmith: "No Surprize"
- 2000 Tribute to Van Halen 2000: "Panama"
- 2000 Cheap Dream: Cheap Trick Tribute: "I Want You to Want Me" (The Mission UK Remix)
- 2000 Leppardmania- A tribute to Def Leppard: "Photograph"
- 2000 Queen 4 A Day Shameless 2000: "Backing Vocals on Far Away, Lonely Night in Paradise"
- 2003 We Wish You A Hairy Christmas "Father Christmas" The Kinks
- 2004 VH1 Classic Metal Mania: Stripped: "I Saw Red (Acoustic)"
- 2005 VH1 Classic Metal Mania Stripped 2: Anthems – "Cherry Pie (Acoustic)"
- 2005 Hell Bent Forever – A tribute to Judas Priest: "Electric Eye"
- 2005 Subdivisions: A Tribute to Rush: "2112 Overture/Temples of Syrinx", "Bastille Day"
- 2006 A Tribute to Bon Jovi: "Lay Your Hands on Me"
- 2007 "Addiction" Liberty N' Justice
- 2007 VH1 Classic Metal Mania Stripped 3: "Heaven (Acoustic)"
- 2007 Monster Ballads Xmas : "Have Yourself a Merry Little Christmas"
- 2007 Famous 4 Madness Shameless 2007: "Backing Vocals on Better Off Without you, Magical Misery, Dirty Shirt, She's Watching You"
- 2008 Alice Cooper Along Came a Spider (songwriting)
- 2008 Led Box – The Ultimate Led Zeppelin Tribute: "The Ocean"
- 2010 Siam Shade Tribute: "1/3 no Junjou na Kanjou"
- 2011 Sin-Atra: A Metal Tribute To Frank Sinatra: "That's Life"
- 2011 "Sin" Liberty N' Justice
- 2012 Dial S for Sex Shameless 2012: Backing Vocals on "Far Away"
- 2021 Jesse Harte – (of SouthGang) Byte The Bullet (Pre-Southgang) + Demos + Live: Backing Vocals on "Cross of Mine"

=== Soundtrack appearances ===
Title	Release	With	Soundtrack
"Game of War"	1989	Warrant	Bill & Ted's Excellent Adventure
"We Will Rock You"	1992	Warrant	Gladiator
"The Power"	1992	Warrant	Gladiator

== Music videos ==
Year	Video	Director
1991	Voices That Care (As Jani Lane) (Various)	David S. Jackson
1990	Cherry Pie (As Jani Lane); Warrant and Bobbie Brown	Jeff Stein
