= 20th Century Masters – The Millennium Collection: The Best of Kingdom Come =

Compilation album by Kingdom Come
- Released: 2003
- Recorded: 1988–1991
- Genre: Heavy metal, hard rock
- Label: Polydor, Universal
- Producer: Lenny Wolf, Bill Levenson

Kingdom Come chronology
| Bad Image (1993) | 20th Century Masters – The Millennium Collection: The Best of Kingdom Come (2003) | Ain't Crying for the Moon (2006) |

Professional ratings
Review scores
| Source | Rating |
|---|---|
| AllMusic | 3/5 stars |

20th Century Masters – The Millennium Collection: The Best of Kingdom Come is the first compilation album by German-American hard rock band Kingdom Come.

== Track listing ==
| No. | Title | Writer(s) | Length |
|---|---|---|---|
| 1. | "Living Out of Touch" | Lenny Wolf, Marty Wolff | 4:17 |
| 2. | "What Love Can Be" | Bruce Gowdy, Wolf, Wolff | 5:14 |
| 3. | "Get It On" | Wolf, Wolff | 4:21 |
| 4. | "Pushin' Hard" | Wolf, Wolff | 4:47 |
| 5. | "Do You Like It" | James Kottak, Danny Stag, Rick Steier, Wolf | 3:36 |
| 6. | "Who Do You Love" | Wolf, Johnny B. Frank, Wolff | 4:12 |
| 7. | "Gotta Go (Can't Wage A War)" | Kottak, Wolf | 4:24 |
| 8. | "Overrated" | Frank, Steier, Wolf | 4:02 |
| 9. | "I've Been Trying" | Wolf | 4:50 |
| 10. | "Should I" | Wolf, Carol Tatum | 5:35 |
| 11. | "You're Not the Only...I Know" | Wolf, Tatum | 4:16 |

== Band members ==
- Lenny Wolf – lead vocals
- Danny Stag – lead guitar
- Rick Steier – rhythm guitar
- Johnny B. Frank – bass
- James Kottak – drums
- Marco Moir – guitar (guitar solo on Should I)
- Bert Meulendijk – guitar (guitar solo on You're Not the Only...I Know)
- Koen van Baal – keyboards
- Steve Burke – drums
- Jimmy Bralower – drums
