= Rendered Waters =

Studio album by Kingdom Come
- Released: March 28, 2011
- Recorded: 2011
- Genres: Heavy metal, hard rock
- Length: 46:37
- Label: Steamhammer Records
- Producer: Lenny Wolf

Kingdom Come chronology
Magnified (2009)	Rendered Waters (2011)	Outlier (2013)

Professional ratings
Review scores
Source	Rating
AllMusic	3.5/5 stars

Rendered Waters is the twelfth album by American/German rock band Kingdom Come. All but three tracks on this disc are old material from previous albums.

== Track listing ==
No.	Title	Writer(s)	Length
1.	"Can't Deny" (re-recorded, originally on Hands of Time)	Lenny Wolf, Marty Wolff	4:05
2.	"The Wind" (re-recorded, originally on In Your Face)	Johnny B. Frank, Danny Stag, Wolf, Wolff	3:46
3.	"Blue Trees"	Wolf	3:21
4.	"Should I" (re-recorded, originally on Hands of Time)	Wolf, Carol Tatum	6:24
5.	"I've Been Trying" (re-recorded, originally on Hands of Time)	Wolf	3:34
6.	"Pushing Hard" (re-recorded, originally on Kingdom Come)	Wolf, Wolff	5:13
7.	"Seventeen" (re-recorded, originally on Kingdom Come)	Wolf, Wolff	4:34
8.	"Is It Fair Enough"	Wolf	4:08
9.	"Living Out Of Touch" (re-recorded, originally on Kingdom Come)	Wolf, Wolff	4:05
10.	"Don't Remember"	Wolf	3:05
11.	"Break Down The Wall" (re-recorded, originally on the album Burns Like A Star by Wolf's earlier band Stone Fury)	Wolf, Bruce Gowdy	4:22

== Band members ==
- Lenny Wolf—lead vocals, bass, guitar
- Eric Förster—lead guitar
- Frank Binke—bass guitar
- Nader Rahy—drums

== Credits ==
- Produced by Lenny Wolf
- Recorded and Mixed at Two Square Noise Factory, Hamburg, Germany
- Mastered by Hanan Rubinstein at The Hub, Berlin, Germany
