= Too (Kingdom Come album) =

Studio album by Kingdom Come
- Released: November 21, 2000
- Recorded: 2000
- Genres: Heavy metal, hard rock
- Length: 47:32
- Label: Eagle Records
- Producer: Lenny Wolf

Kingdom Come chronology
Master Seven (1997)	Too (2000)	Independent (2002)

Professional ratings
Review scores
Source	Rating
Allmusic	link

Too is the seventh album by the band Kingdom Come. It contains eight new tracks and three re-recordings of previously released Stone Fury songs.

== Track listing ==
No.	Title	Writer(s)	Length
1.	"It Ain't So Bad"	Lenny Wolf	4:33
2.	"Free Your Mind"	Luca Maric, Wolf	3:42
3.	"Waiting"	Wolf	5:10
4.	"Too Late" (re-recorded, originally on the Stone Fury album Let Them Talk)	Bruce Gowdy, Marty Wolff, Wolf	6:10
5.	"You're My Secret"	Wolf	3:15
6.	"Hey Man"	Wolf	4:38
7.	"Tease" (re-recorded, originally on the Stone Fury album Burns Like a Star)	Gowdy, Wolff, Wolf	3:23
8.	"Mighty Old Man"	Maric, Wolf	3:23
9.	"Tell Me What I've Done"	Maric, Wolf	3:44
10.	"Should Have Told You" (re-recorded, originally on the Stone Fury album Let Them Talk)	Gowdy, Wolff, Wolf	4:49
11.	"Joe English"	Maric, Wolf	4:45

== Band members ==
- Lenny Wolf – vocals & rhythm guitar
- Oliver Kiessner – rhythm & lead guitar
- Mirko Michalzik – solo guitar
- Mark Smith – bass
- Mark Cross – drums
- Bjorn Tiemann – keyboards
