= Angels of Venice =

Musical group

Angels Of Venice
- Origin: Los Angeles, California, United States
- Years active: 1993–present
- Members: Carol Tatum; Cathy Biagini; Susan Craig Winsberg; Irina Chirkova; Christina Linhardt
- Website: www.angelsofvenice.com

Angels Of Venice is a harp, flute and cello group founded by harpist Carol Tatum in 1993. The group's core sound is harp, flute and cello but also combines Middle Eastern, medieval and neoclassical styles.

== Members ==
The official members of Angels Of Venice are:

- Carol Tatum - harp, composer, producer
- Cathy Biagini - cello
- Susan Craig Winsberg - flute
- Suzanne Tang - flute
- Christina Linhardt - vocals, flute

Their self-titled album was released through Windham Hill Records/Sony BMG as well as numerous tracks on twenty Windham Hill compilations. Originally Angels of Venice was purely an instrumental group with cameo vocal performances. Featured guest vocalists who have recorded with Angels Of Venice are world music vocalist Azam Ali (VAS, Niyaz), shock-rock/goth singer Charles Edward (featured vocalist on Ancient Delirium) from the industrial goth band Seraphim Shock, German-American vocalist Christina Linhardt and early music/opera tenor Daniel Plaster ("Polorum regina" on the album Sanctus). Founder Carol Tatum co-wrote songs with rock vocalist Lenny Wolf of the band Kingdom Come for the albums "Hands of Time," "Bad Image," "Rendered Waters" and "Live & Unplugged."

== Discography ==
=== Music For Harp, Flute And Cello (1994) ===
Track listing

1. Pachelbel's Canon
2. Little Angels
3. Dragonfly
4. Crystal Tears
5. An English Garden
6. Greensleeves
7. Sara's Dream
8. Night Spirits
9. Luna Mystica
10. A Time For Dreams
11. The Enchanted Forest
12. Lover's Requiem
13. The Reflecting Pool
14. Dreamcatcher

=== Awake Inside A Dream (1996) ===
Track listing

1. Lionheart
2. A Chantar Mer
3. Nana
4. The Sins Of Salome
5. Scarborough Faire (featuring the Dramatics)
6. Three Nightingales
7. The World Beyond The Woods
8. China Moon
9. Light At The Edge Of The World
10. Awake Inside A Dream

=== Angels of Venice (1999) ===
Track listing

1. Sad Lisa
2. Lionheart
3. After The Harvest
4. A Chantar Mer
5. Within You Without You
6. Trotto
7. Queen Of The Sun
8. Si Je Perdais Mon Ami
9. As Tears Go By
10. China Moon
11. Tears Of The World (Lacrimae Mundi)

=== Music for Harp (2001) ===
Track listing

1. Nothing Else Matters (Metallica Cover) (04:55)
2. Persentio (Latin for "to Deeply Feel") (06:23)
3. Voyage of the Sea Witch (05:06)
4. Starshine Lullabye (03:22)
5. Non Alegra (03:18)
6. Forever After (07:16)
7. I Dreamt That I Dwelt in Marble Halls (04:29)
8. Parson's Farewell (04:47)
9. Wildflowers (05:16)
10. Adagio in F Major (03:42)

=== Sanctus (2003) ===
Track listing

1. Carol of the Bells
2. God Rest Ye Merry Gentlemen
3. Little Drummer Boy
4. Polorum Regina - Llibre Vermell (The Red Book, 14th Century)
5. What Child is This?
6. We Three Kings
7. O Holy Night
8. Silent Night
9. Edelweiss
10. Good King Winceslas
11. Dance of the Sugar Plum Fairy
12. Carol of the Bells (Vocal Version)

=== Ancient Delirium (2009) ===
Track listing

1. Nag (The Serpent King)
2. Ancient Delirium
3. Dreams and Nightmares
4. Friends (by Led Zeppelin
5. Am I Dreaming?
6. Dance Until You Forget
7. Primitive Kiss
8. Ahava
9. I Fall
10. How Can I?
11. Courtesan Suite
