= Count Smokula =

- Created by: Robert "Smokey" Miles
- Portrayed by: Robert "Smokey" Miles

In-universe information
- Occupation: Comedian, musician, actor

Count Smokula is a comedic fictional character created and portrayed by Robert "Smokey" Miles. He has made multiple live appearances, roles in movies, TV shows and internet videos.

== Count Smokula and Smokesylvania ==
As imagined by Miles, Count Smokula is a 496-year-old accordion-playing vampire with a cape and fez from the vaguely Eastern-European nation of Smokesylvania. He has been described as "Bela Lugosi-meets-Jackie Mason" and as "a sort of Yiddish Dracula, who plays the accordion and exhibits the longest tongue this side of Gene Simmons of KISS". The Count has a thick Smokesylvanian accent (he plays the "sqveezebox" and loves "to rock like you vouldn't believe it"). Music is his first love and the Count Smokula Orchestra started up about 300 years ago in Glipsch, Smokesylvania where he was greatly influenced by Shnotta Shmulevitz, Smokesylvania's most famous singer. But he definitely doesn't suck - as he says "I gave up fangs and blood 300 years ago, my doctor told me too much cholesterol". He subscribes to a belief in Smokulism, a "voild vide" faith revealed to the Count one sleepless night in 1997 after "ingesting a rather large vegetarian pizza in the presence of the Russian Madonna". It is a way of raising ones thoughts up from the dirt and down from the clouds to live in the world as it is, and this National Belief System of Smokesylvania can be achieved by just paying $10 for a certificate to become a true Smokulist.

At an indefinite date, the Count left Smokesylvania (or rather, it left him since he tells us they moved the country stone-by-stone to the South Pacific since "the veather vas too inclement") for Hollywood, California where he planned to make a fortune as a "public excess show host" so he could restore the glory of Smokesylvania.

== Appearances ==
=== "Live" appearances ===
The Count has been a longtime regular at the annual Doo Dah Parade in Pasadena, a counter-culture event to the Rose Parade, where he is a familiar and often photographed figure. The Count is one of a number of odd characters who show up for this, often described as "irreverent and wacky." To quote him “It's got to be a bit irregular to be the true Doo Dah” and “There's nothing else vorthvhile in January” He has competed for Queen multiple times - a process likened to "a cross between the Miss America pageant and “The Gong Show".

The Count got his start in the Los Angeles underground scene, often performing at burlesque shows, and has a special affinity for burlesque and strippers. His relationship with the burlesque revival group, the Fishnet Floozys, has made him MC at a number of their shows in Los Angeles and Hollywood and hosting the "Count Smokula Burlesque Review". He is also MC for the "Burlesque Cabaret" at the Red Door Gallery in Phoenix,, the host of Shimmy Magazine's all-star fundraiser in Los Angeles,and performs at the Los Angeles Exotica Burlesque. He trekked out to the Mojave Desert near Route 66 for the annual Miss Exotic World Pageant at the Exotic World Burlesque Museum run by former exotic dancer Dixie Evans.

Count Smokula has had a long association with independent cult film producer Troma Films, creator of films such as The Toxic Avenger and Blood Sucking Freaks. As the Count has said "When watching a Troma movie, you must not only suspend your disbelief: you must lock it up in a small iron crate and torture it." The Count has appeared several times at the TromaDance Film Festival in Park City, Utah, the camp version of the Sundance Film Festival. He also composed the Official TromaDance Theme Song introduced at TromaDance 2005. More recently, the Count was seen at the American Film Market (AFM) event in Santa Monica, California in company with Troma founder Lloyd Kaufman to celebrate the 10th anniversary of TromaDance. The appearance made the front page of the November 7, 2008 edition of The Hollywood Reporter.

He has even ventured off to the U.S. Naval Station at Guantanamo where he was the Ringmaster of the Vamphear Circus in April 2006 featuring opera clown Christina Linhardt, Hillel aka Mr. Balloonman, stilt walker and fire eater Philip Solomon and aerialist Brandy Wirtz. A highlight of the show was his rendition of his own "Guantanamo Bay Theme Song". The trip is the subject of the 2013 short documentary Guantanamo Circus by Christina Linhardt and Michael L. Rose.

=== TV, film and the Internet ===
In 1996, Count Smokula got his first start on underground fame with his own cult Public-access television cable TV show The Count Smokula Show ("the greatest talk show in the voild"). He also hosted the "Freak of the Week" segments for Troma's Edge TV which had guests who swallowed swords, ate fire and devoured light bulbs. A further search for such abilities led to the first international episode at the Cannes Film Festival in May 2000 with co-host Shelley Michelle. Count Smokula was also a "date" on the "Singers need love too" episode of TV show Blind Date (March 2005) and almost a superhero on the Sci Fi Channel reality show Who Wants to be a Superhero?. He didn't quite make the cut on the show's pilot episode (July 2006). As Smokey Miles, he made an uncredited appearance as a pianist in Twin Peaks: The Return.

As a film actor, the Count has appeared in various flicks including the 2004 straight-to-video anthology film from Troma Entertainment entitled Tales from the Crapper (which was filmed over three years, with six directors and 15 writers) with actress and model Julie Strain. and the "Coming Soon" Curse of the Black Pussycat starring Rena Riffel.

== Music ==
Count Smokula is a musician and singer, and as such has hosted and performed at the Rock City News Music Awards for a number of years He was also one of the "three days of accordions" performers at the 2008 Los Angeles Accordion Festival. And he is most likely the oldest member of the Rockabilly Hall of Fame. As a songwriter, Count Smokula has composed the soundtracks for Troma Entertainment movies All the Love You Cannes! (2002) and Tales from the Crapper (2004) as well as the 2006 classics Vampira: The Movie and Poultrygeist: Night of the Chicken Dead.

At the 13th Annual Los Angeles Music Awards in 2003, the Count was given the award for Comedy Album of the Year for his CD Authentic Sounds of Smokesylvania. He can also be heard on the 2006 Poultrygeist: Night Of The Chicken Dead CD produced by Troma Entertainment and his number "Transylbearian Woods" is part of the 2005 CD 30!!! Years Bear Family Records.
