= Get It On (Kingdom Come song) =

Single by Kingdom Come

from the album Kingdom Come
- Released: 1988
- Genre: Hard rock, glam metal
- Length: 4:23
- Label: Polydor Records
- Songwriter(s): Lenny Wolf, Marty Wolff
- Producer(s): Lenny Wolf, Bob Rock

Kingdom Come singles chronology
"Get It On" (1988)	"What Love Can Be" (1988)

"Get It On" is the first single by hard rock/glam metal band Kingdom Come from their self-titled debut album. It reached number four on the Billboard Album Rock Tracks chart and number 69 on the Billboard Hot 100 singles chart.

== Track listing ==
1. "Get It On" (Music - L. Wolf / Words - M. Wolff, L. Wolf) 4:23
2. "17" (Music - L. Wolf / Words - M. Wolff, L. Wolf) 5:28
3. "Loving You" (Music - L. Wolf, D. Stag / Words - M. Wolff, L. Wolf) 4:46

== Personnel ==
- Lenny Wolf – lead vocals
- Danny Stag – lead guitar
- Rick Steier – rhythm guitar, keyboards
- Johnny B. Frank – bass
- James Kottak – drums

== Charts ==
Chart (1988)	Peak position
U.S. Billboard Hot 100	69
UK Singles Chart	75
