= Bareback (disambiguation) =

Bareback is a form of horseback riding without a saddle.

Bareback may also refer to:

- Bareback bronc riding, a rodeo event that involves a rodeo participant riding a bucking horse that attempts to throw or buck off the rider
- Bareback sex, sexual penetration without a condom
- Bareback (album), a 1991 album by Wild Horses
- "Bareback" (song), a 2003 song by The Darkness
