= Halyx =

Former rock band

- Halyx poster in 1981

Disneyland
- Area: Tomorrowland
- Opening date: June 20, 1981
- Closing date: September 11, 1981

Ride statistics
- Attraction type: Rock concert
- Music: Disneyland Records

Halyx (pronounced HAY-licks) was a short-lived science fiction themed rock band developed by Disneyland Records that performed at Tomorrowland in Disneyland in 1981 at the Space Stage. They played only for one summer before the event was closed on September 11, 1981.

== History ==
In the early 1980s, a team at Disneyland Records, which included executive Gary Krisel, Jymn Magon and Mike Post, wanted to experiment with creating a rock band. After the success of Star Wars (1977) and its second installment The Empire Strikes Back (1980), the team devised a concept of an intergalactic rock band that was a cross between Van Halen or Kiss and Star Wars. They decided that Tomorrowland would be an appropriate venue for their debut as the venue would also be a testing ground for potential music releases.

The names Strike and Starfire were suggested, with Starfire making it into concept art for the band, but it was decided to go with Halyx instead, a play on the word helix, to the dismay of some of the members and the producers. The team eventually settled on the name Halyx, and got band members who would make the band a mixture of human and costumed non-human performers. In auditions, singer Lora Mumford was chosen to be the lead singer while her husband, Thom Miller, would be a robotic keyboardist. Bassist Roger Freeland was put inside a Wookiee-like costume which he called the Baharnoth while Tony Coppola was made a percussionist in an amphibian costume. Drummer Brian Lucas, guitarist Bruce Gowdy, and backing singers Jeanette Clinger and Karen Tobin were hired as well.

The band only performed for one season in 1981, with Disneyland management stopping the project and no music being officially released as a deal between Disneyland Records and Warner Music Group had collapsed.

== Members ==
- Lora Mumford - Lead vocals
- Bruce Gowdy - Guitars
- Thom Miller - Keyboards
- Roger Freeland - Bass
- Brian Lucas - Drums
- Tony Coppola - Percussion and acrobatics
- Jeanette Clinger - Backing vocals
- Karen Tobin - Backing vocals

== Legacy ==
In 2008, audio recordings of Halyx songs from the live concerts found their way onto YouTube.

On August 20, 2020, YouTube web series Defunctland released the film Live from the Space Stage: A Halyx Story, which was a documentary about the band. The film was produced and edited by Kevin Perjurer and directed by Matthew Serrano. On November 14, 2020, YouTube channel Themed Alternative, also run by Perjurer, uploaded a tribute music video named "HAIL HALYX," with the channel also premiering a video titled "HALYX: Reunited" where members and crew of the attraction met over a video call.
