= Burn It Up =

Burn It Up may refer to:

- "Burn It Up" (R. Kelly song)", 2006
- "Burn It Up" (Wanna One song)", 2017
- "Burn It Up", a 1988 song by The Beatmasters with P. P. Arnold
- "Burn It Up", a 2009 song by Jessie James from her eponymous album
- "Burn It Up", a 1992 song by The Offspring from Ignition
- "Burn It Up", a 2000 song by Doro Pesch from Calling the Wild
- "Burn It Up", a 1991 song by Wild Horses from Bareback
- "Burnitup!", a 2015 song by Janet Jackson featuring Missy Elliott, from Unbreakable
- "Burn It Up" a 2019 techno song by Rynx
- "Burn It Up", a 2022 song by Cory Marks from the extended play I Rise
