= Ain't Crying for the Moon =

Studio album by Kingdom Come
- Released: 2006
- Genre: Heavy metal; hard rock
- Length: 62:46
- Label: Frontiers Records
- Producer: Lenny Wolf

Kingdom Come chronology
Perpetual (2004)	Ain't Crying for the Moon (2006)	Rendered Waters (2011)

Ain't Crying for the Moon is the tenth studio album by rock band Kingdom Come.

== Track listing ==
All songs by Lenny Wolf, except where noted.

1. "Two Legged Sheep" – 5:28
2. "Not Here to Be Your Friend" – 3:50
3. "Same Old Stars" – 3:28
4. "Ain't Crying for the Moon" – 8:34
5. "Perfect Citizen" – 5:34
6. "This Is My Life" – 4:15
7. "Bon Scott" – 4:13
8. "Remove the Sting" – 5:49
9. "Friends In Spirit" – 5:35
10. "Darkroom" – 3:47
11. "Look at You" – 3:53
12. "Across the Universe" (John Lennon, Paul McCartney) – 3:58
13. "Get It On" (Lenny Wolf, Marty Wolff) – 4:22

== Personnel ==
- Lenny Wolf – lead vocals and all instruments
- Eric Förster – guitar solos
- Hehdrik Thiesbrummel – piano
- Produced by Lenny Wolf
