= Jackie Lee Cochran =

American singer-songwriter

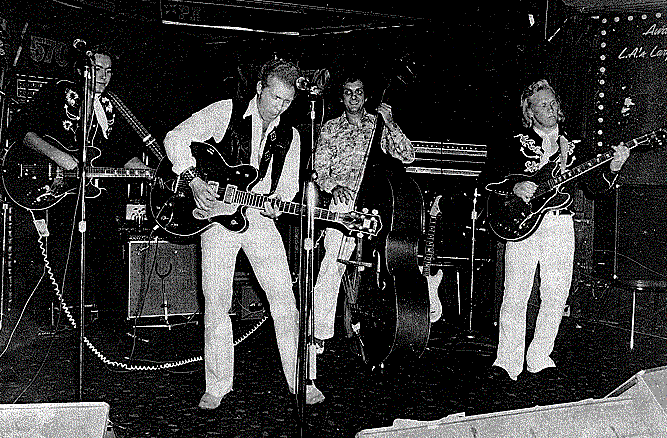
- Cochran with Ray Campi performing at Palomino Club, North Hollywood, 1976

Background information
- Also known as: Jack the Cat
- Born: February 5, 1934; Dalton, Georgia, U.S.
- Died: March 15, 1998 (aged 64) Burbank, California, U.S.
- Genres: Rockabilly
- Occupation: musician
- Years active: 1956–1998

Jackie Lee Cochran (February 5, 1934, Dalton, Georgia – March 15, 1998, Burbank, California) was an American rockabilly musician, known as Jack the Cat.

== Biography ==
Cochran had a twin brother who died at the age of two. He began playing guitar at age six. His father was sentenced to 30 years in prison for murder, and as a result Cochran spent much of his youth living with relatives in Louisiana, Meridian, Mississippi, and with his grandmother in Gadsden, Alabama.

Cochran first began performing on the local music scene in Gadsden, which displeased his grandmother, who wanted him to join the military. She convinced him to enlist in the Air Force, where he was stationed in San Antonio. He traveled each weekend to Abilene to play on Slim Willet's radio show. This brought him to the attention of the managers of the Big D Jamboree, who had him perform on this program as well. He was then transferred to Selma, Alabama, where he founded the country group The Flying C Ranch Boys. This group performed in local bars and restaurants, as well as on radio station WBAM. He was dismissed from the Air Force in 1955, and following this he became a member of Jimmy Swan's band in Hattiesburg. In the mid-1950s he appeared on Cliffie Stone's Hometown Jamboree in Los Angeles. He began playing rockabilly shortly after hearing Elvis Presley.

Cochran hired manager Pat O'Donnell, who came up with Cochran's "Jack the Cat" name and image. Through O'Donnell, Cochran was offered a recording contract with Sims Records. His first singles for the label appeared in 1956. After further appearances on the Big D Jamboree he was asked to play on the Spade Cooley show in California. Despite O'Donnell's disapproval, Cochran moved to the West Coast and performed on the show. He then signed with Decca Records, and his single "Ruby Pearl" sold well and nearly hit the Billboard charts, but his manager let the Decca contract lapse, and the single fizzled before charting.

After a short time with Viv Records, Cochran took up work at the Douglas Aircraft Company and quit music for a time. He restarted his career during the rockabilly revival in Europe, releasing three albums on Rollin' Rock Records in 1973 and touring Norway in 1981. He took up the nickname "Waukeen" in the 1970s as well, a name given to him by his native American grandmother. In 1985, the German record label Hydra released a successful compilation of his early recordings (later on CD) "Jack The Cat - The Jackie Lee Cochran Story". To promote the album the label boss Klaus Kettner put together a European tour for Jackie Lee Cochran which was so successful, that they teamed up for all the following tours until his death. He recorded new material for Hydra Records and Ace Records. He died in 1998 in his apartment in California at age 64.

During the 70's, Waukeen mostly played at the Burning Tree Lounge on Santa Monica Blvd with Jim King on Hammond organ and key bass and Robert Huber on drums and backup vocals. They also played at the nearby Haystack Saloon and the Gaslight.

== Discography ==
=== Singles ===
Year	Title	Label	
1956	Riverside Jump / Hip Shakin’ Mama	Sims Records	
1957	Ruby Pearl / Mama Don’t You Think I Know	Decca Records	
1958	I Want You / Buy A Car	Viv Records	
1958	I Want You / Buy A Car	Avalon Records	
1958	I Want You / Buy A Car	ABC-Paramount Records	
1958	Pity Me / Endless Love	Spry Records	
1959	I Wanna See You / Georgia Lee Brown	Jaguar Records	
1985	I Wanna See You / Pity Me / Honey Don't / Tryin´ To Get To You	Hydra Records EP	
	Baby Do; Dear Mom and Dad; Don’t Be Long; Out Across The Tracks	not issued in the 50s	Hydra Records

=== Albums ===
- 1973: Swamp Fox
- 1980: Rockabilly Legend
- 1981: The Lonesome Drifter (UK)
- 1985: Jack The Cat (GER)
- 1985: Fiddle Fit Man (UK)
- 1987: Rockabilly Legend (GER)
- 1993: Jack The Cat (GER)
- 1997: Rockabilly Music
- 2005: The 1985 Session (UK)
