= Buster Brown (American band) =

American glam metal band

- Origin: Louisville, Kentucky, U.S.
- Genres: Glam metal

Buster Brown was an American glam metal band from Louisville, Kentucky. Members included lead vocalist Johnny Edwards, guitarist Allan Phelps, and bassist Kevin Downs.

The band went through several drummers. Drummer Bob Koestel played on the band's first album, Loud and Clear. Drummer James Kottak played on the band's second album, Sign of Victory.

After the band's second album Sign Of Victory, Johnny Edwards and James Kottak were recruited by guitarist Ronnie Montrose into his band Montrose. They played on the Montrose album Mean. Johnny Edwards, James Kottak, Kevin Downs and Tony Bowles played together in the original line-up of the band Wild Horses. They were signed to Atlantic Records and were in the studio when shortly after the forming of Wild Horses, Johnny Edwards left to replace Lou Gramm in the band Foreigner, with which he sang on the album Unusual Heat. Shortly after the release of Unusual Heat, Lou Gramm returned to Foreigner and Johnny Edwards was let go. Johnny Edwards went on to form the band Royal Jelly that was short-lived.

Drummer James Kottak had a long career playing in the German band Scorpions until 2016 when he was replaced by Mikkey Dee. Tony Bowles plays in the Hank Williams Jr. band.

== Discography ==
=== Studio albums ===
- Loud and Clear (1984)
- Sign of Victory (1985)
