= Master Seven =

Studio album by Kingdom Come
- Released: 1997
- Studio: Eastern Pacific Studios 59, Basel, Switzerland
- Genre: Hard rock, heavy metal
- Length: 61:29
- Label: Viceroy Music Europe
- Producer: Lenny Wolf, Joerg Dogondke

Kingdom Come chronology
Twilight Cruiser (1995)	Master Seven (1997)	Too (2000)

Professional ratings
Review scores
Source	Rating
Collector's Guide to Heavy Metal	7/10

Master Seven is the sixth studio album by the hard rock band Kingdom Come.

== Track listing ==
All tracks are written by Lenny Wolf, except where noted.

No.	Title	Length
1.	"Only Rainbows Know"	4:09
2.	"More Restrictions"	5:03
3.	"Gonna Loose Her"	5:28
4.	"Can't Let Go"	6:26
5.	"Slow Down" (music by: Wolf, Angi Schiliro, lyrics by: Wolf, Marty Wolff)	4:01
6.	"Seen Enough"	5:48
7.	"Can't Let Go (Director's Cut)"	2:38
8.	"Gonna Try"	5:05
9.	"Can't Fake Affection"	6:37
10.	"Bad I Am"	3:58
11.	"High on Love"	5:25
12.	"Get Up My Friend"	3:52
13.	"Roses"	3:01

== Personnel ==
Kingdom Come

- Lenny Wolf – vocals, rhythm guitar, producer, mixing
- Marcus Deml – lead guitar
- Oliver Kiessner – rhythm and acoustic guitars
- Mark Smith – bass

Additional musicians

- Dion Murdock – drums
- Bjorn Tiemann – strings, orchestration and other noise

Production

- Angi Schiliro – engineer, mixing
- Glen Miller – mastering
- Joerg Dogondke – executive producer
