= Troy Walker =

American club singer

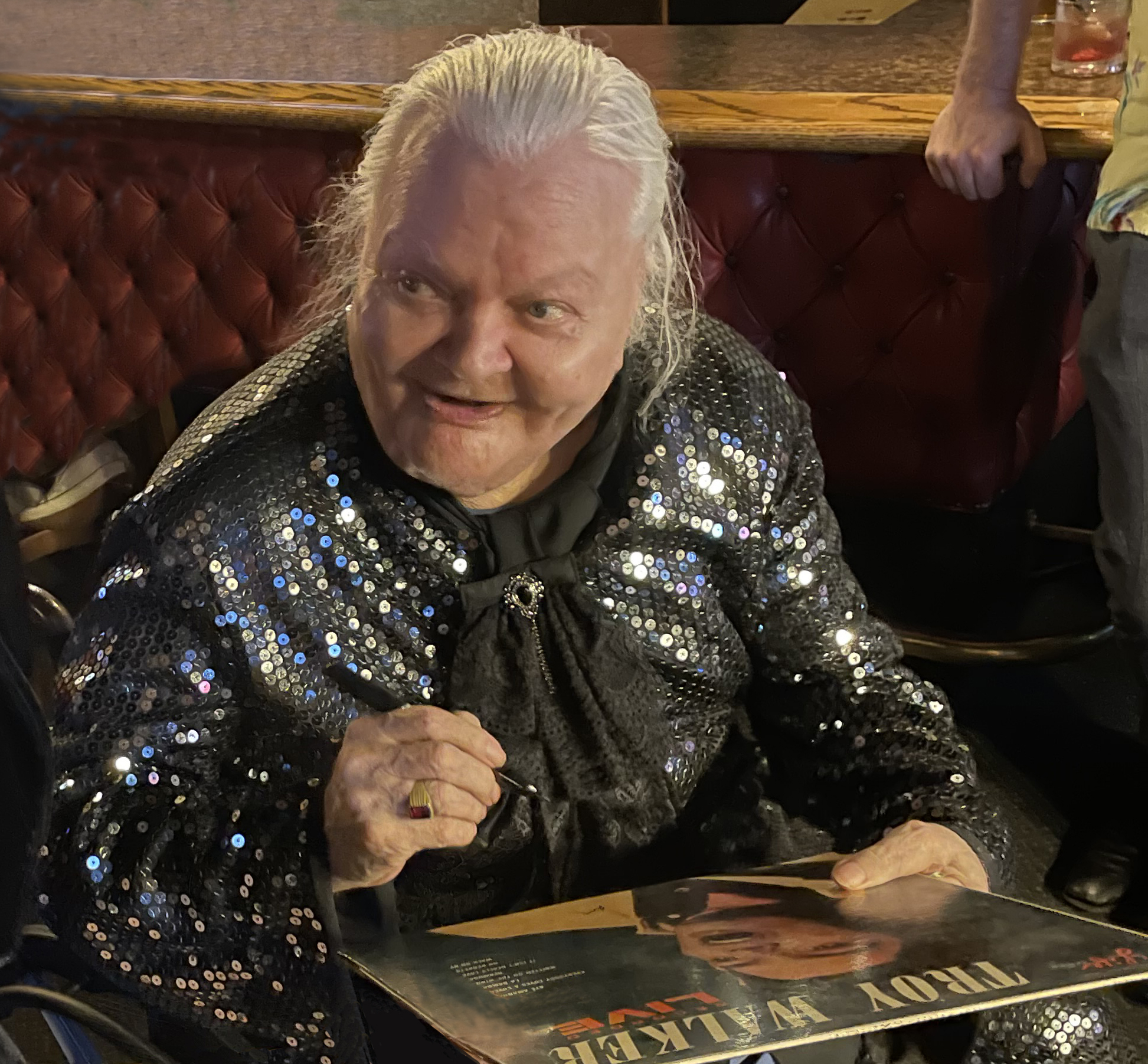
- Walker in 2022
- Born: Richard Walker; 1938 (age 87–88); Chicago, Illinois
- Occupation: Singer
- Years active: 1950s-present

Troy Walker (born Richard Walker; 1938) is an American singer known for his live stage performances which included comedy, impersonations, and banter. "He struts onto a nightclub floor," reported the L.A. Weekly in 1999, "A painstakingly coifed roaring fireball of conflict and artistry in 6-inch heels and an ostrich boa." The paper also called him "the world's first and only professional transgender country singer." Billboard described him as a "wild rocker" with "swinging vocals" in the same review.

== Early life ==
Walker was born Richard Walker in Chicago, Illinois in 1938. His family life was unstable and he was sent to a boys' school in Arizona at a young age. He later attended the University of Arizona and was discovered by bandleader Skitch Henderson while serving in the United States Air Force.

== Career ==
Walker moved to Los Angeles in 1958 and sang pop, country, and rock ‘n roll songs at nightclubs, including a stint with partner Timi Yuro. The openly gay Walker felt he could be freer about his personal life in Hollywood. He released his first album Troy Walker Live in 1962 on Life Records. Walker believes his inclusion of the song "Happiness is a Thing Called Joe" caused DJs to send the record back to the label. "They wouldn't play music by a man singing to a man" he told KXLU interviewer Chris Wilson in 2010.

Walker was a regular performer at nightclubs on the Sunset Strip, including the Interlude and Gene Norman's Crescendo with his band, led by a pre-Captain & Tennille Daryl Dragon and featuring percussionist Spider Webb. He was also the opening act for performers including Ella Fitzgerald, Dinah Washington, and Tina Turner.

Elvis Presley, Louella Parsons, Ethel Merman and Gregory Peck attended Walker's shows. Ronald Reagan hired him to perform at a private party on his ranch. Walker enjoyed a 17-year stint at the famed country and western nightclub The Palomino Club in North Hollywood where he performed with Jerry Lee Lewis.

The Valley News reported in 1970 that Walker "looked as out of place as Lord Fauntleroy at a boxing arena" when he performed at a country music club. While in the Air Force, Walker traveled the world performing for the troops.

Starting in the 1970s his song "Marijuana Munchies" became a regular on the Dr. Demento radio show. Walker is the subject of the documentary film, directed by Christina Linhardt, TROY, The Original Lady Boy, which premiered in 2019 as part of the Indianapolis LGBT Film Festival.

== Discography ==
Walker released two live albums and several singles throughout the 1960s and 1970s.

- Troy Walker – Live (1962; Life Series)
- Gazzari's Presents Troy Walker From Hollywood
- "Summertime"/"Midnight in Moscow" (1962)
- "She's All Right"/"I'm Getting Hip" (Trans World)
- "It's Not the End of My World" / "Marijuana Munchies" (EMI Golden Wing)
- "It Isn't Really Love"/"No Regrets" (HiFi Records)
- "Country Soul Rock and Roll" / "My Friend is Gone" (MCI Golden Wing Records)
