= Kingdom Come (Kingdom Come album) =

Studio album by Kingdom Come
- Released: February 29, 1988
- Recorded: August 1987
- Studios: Little Mountain Studios, Vancouver, British Columbia, Canada
- Genres: Hard rock, glam metal
- Length: 48:25
- Label: Polydor
- Producers: Bob Rock, Lenny Wolf

Kingdom Come chronology
Kingdom Come (1988)	In Your Face (1989)

Singles from Kingdom Come
- 1. "Get It On" Released: 1988; 2. "What Love Can Be" Released: 1988; 3. "Loving You" Released: 1988 (Japan only)

Professional ratings
Review scores
Source	Rating
AllMusic	4/5 stars
Collector's Guide to Heavy Metal	6/10
Kerrang!	4/5 stars

Kingdom Come is the debut album by American/German hard rock band Kingdom Come, released in 1988.

The album peaked at number twelve on the U.S. Billboard 200 and obtained gold certification from the RIAA, the only Kingdom Come album to achieve this feat. The album's lead single was "Get It On", which entered at number 69 on the Billboard Hot 100 chart and number four on the magazine's Mainstream Rock chart, and it remains the band's best-known song.

== Contemporary reviews ==
In the May 1988 issue of Circus magazine, music critic Paul Gallotta offered a nuanced perspective on the debut effort, categorizing it as a highly enjoyable yet derivative work. The reviewer noted that driven by the success of the uptempo lead single "Get It On," the initial shipment of the record to stores nearly achieved platinum status. However, Gallotta drew heavy stylistic comparisons to Led Zeppelin, sharply noting that the musicians owed a creative debt to the legendary rock veterans in terms of songwriting. While the publication praised tracks like "Living Out of Touch," "Hideaway," and "What Love Can Be" as potential hit singles and commended the overall absence of filler material, the evaluation concluded that until the formation developed a more distinctive, original sound, the material would remain an entertaining but ultimately forgettable effort.

== Track listing ==
Side one
No.	Title	Lyrics	Music	Length
1.	"Living Out of Touch"	Marty Wolff, Lenny Wolf	Wolf	4:17
2.	"Pushin' Hard"	Wolff, Wolf	Wolf	4:47
3.	"What Love Can Be"	Wolff, Wolf	Wolf, Bruce Gowdy	5:14
4.	"17"	Wolff, Wolf	Wolf	5:26
5.	"The Shuffle"	Danny Stag, Wolff	Wolf	3:40

Side two
No.	Title	Lyrics	Music	Length
6.	"Get It On"	Wolff, Wolf	Wolf	4:21
7.	"Now Forever After"	James Kottak, Wolf, Wolff	Wolf	5:36
8.	"Hideaway"	Johnny B. Frank, Wolff	Wolf	5:38
9.	"Loving You"	Wolff, Wolf	Wolf, Stag	4:46
10.	"Shout It Out"	Wolff, Wolf	Wolf	3:37

2004 remaster bonus track
No.	Title	Lyrics	Music	Length
11.	"Get It On (12" promo mix)"	Wolf, Wolff	Wolf	4:24

== Personnel ==
Kingdom Come

- Lenny Wolf – lead vocals, producer
- Danny Stag – lead guitar
- Rick Steier – rhythm guitar, keyboards
- Johnny B. Frank – bass
- James Kottak – drums

Production

- Bob Rock – producer, engineer, mixing at Electric Lady Studios, New York City
- Tim Crich – engineer
- Ken Steiger – mixing assistant
- George Marino – mastering at Sterling Sound, New York City,
- Hugh Syme – art direction, design

== Charts ==
Chart (1988)	Peak position
Australian Albums (Kent Music Report)	50
Canada Top Albums/CDs (RPM)	23
Dutch Albums (Album Top 100)	41
Finnish Albums (The Official Finnish Charts)	22
German Albums (Offizielle Top 100)	65
New Zealand Albums (RMNZ)	40
Norwegian Albums (VG-lista)	13
Swedish Albums (Sverigetopplistan)	45
UK Albums (Official Charts)	43
US Billboard 200	12

== Certifications ==
Certifications for Kingdom Come
Region	Certification	Certified units/sales
Canada (Music Canada)	Gold	50,000^{^}
United States (RIAA)	Gold	500,000^{^}
^{^} Shipments figures based on certification alone.
