= Johnny Edwards (musician) =

American singer

- Born: John Douglas Edwards
- Origin: Louisville, Kentucky, U.S.
- Genres: Rock, hard rock, heavy metal, glam metal
- Occupations: Singer, songwriter
- Years active: 1980s–present

John Douglas Edwards is an American rock singer who sang for the bands Buster Brown, Montrose, King Kobra, Wild Horses, Northrup, Royal Jelly and is best known as the second lead singer of the rock band Foreigner.

== Biography ==
Edwards' first band of note was Buster Brown from Louisville, Kentucky. Together with drummer James Kottak, who had joined the group for their 1985 sophomore album, Sign of Victory, Edwards was recruited by guitarist Ronnie Montrose to appear on his 1987 album, Mean. Now based in California, Edwards teamed up with the band Northrup whose members were approached by drummer Carmine Appice to join forces in a new version of King Kobra. The resulting King Kobra III' album was released in 1988 but Appice's focus was already on Blue Murder by then and King Kobra split up.

With Northrup not making any progress and a deal with Enigma Records falling apart, Edwards joined former Buster Brown and Montrose bandmate James Kottak, fresh out of Kingdom Come, and Kingdom Come guitarist Rick Steier in a new band called Wild Horses, championed by producer Keith Olsen. However, Edwards would end up leaving the band before their first album after receiving an offer to join Foreigner.

Mick Jones, the founding member, lead guitarist, and main songwriter of Foreigner had been at home recovering from having the flu. Jones was in the process of listening to audition tapes of various singers to replace the newly departed Lou Gramm when he came upon a cassette of Johnny Edwards. Upon hearing the demo tape, he jumped out of bed and shouted out, "This is it!", referring to Edwards as Jones' choice as Foreigner's new lead singer.

Released on June 14, 1991, Foreigner's new album, Unusual Heat had eleven songs in total, and ten of these were the combination of mainstay Mick, Johnny and co-producer, Terry Thomas, who had previously worked with Bad Company's lead vocalist, Brian Howe, on their last three albums as producer and songwriter.

In addition to providing lead vocals, Edwards was also an accomplished guitarist who not only played rhythm guitar but also played the lead guitar in the song "Mountain of Love", the fifth track on the Unusual Heat album. The Billboard 200 documented Unusual Heat at #117 on August 3, 1991. The album's first single, "Lowdown and Dirty" was included on the band's Rhino double-CD retrospective, "Juke Box Heroes". Edwards was not accepted by Foreigner fans, as he did not sound much like Lou Gramm. Unusual Heat was a commercial failure, and Gramm returned the following year, immediately ending Edwards' tenure as Foreigner's lead vocalist. In 1992, the reunited Gramm and Foreigner founder Mick Jones released The Very Best & Beyond, a greatest hits collection with three new songs. One of the tracks, "With Heaven On Our Side", was co-written by Johnny Edwards. At the time of his departure from Foreigner, Edwards had co-written ten songs with Jones, in anticipation of a follow-up album to Unusual Heat.

After leaving Foreigner, Edwards teamed up with former Kingdom Come guitarist Danny Steigerwald, a.k.a. Danny Stag, bassist David Seaton, and drummer Jeff Klaven, formerly with Cobra and Krokus, under the name Royal Jelly. The group's eponymous 1994 debut album was produced by Matt Wallace and released on Island Records. Despite its contemporary alternative rock flavor, it sank without a trace.

"It was the best thing I ever did musically. That's the only thing I've ever done that I can listen to today without throwing up. I always said if I could record one album I was proud of, I would be satisfied."

– Johnny Edwards on his album with Royal Jelly

Edwards mostly retired from playing and recording music in 1995, returning to his hometown of Louisville, Kentucky, to raise a family. He later became associated with the telecommunications industry.

In 2001 an album of Northrup demos recorded in the late 1980s featuring Edwards on lead vocals, was released by Metal Mayhem Music under the name JK Northrup.

In a 2004 interview Jeff "JK" Northrup, Edwards' old bandmate and friend, discussed receiving an offer to record a new rock album with Edwards as vocalist. Edwards declined, choosing to remain outside music. Paul Shortino assumed lead vocals on the project. Edwards still contributed songwriting and co-lead vocals for two tracks on the album Afterlife, issued in 2004 on MTM Music.

Edwards made another guest vocal appearance on JK Northrup's 2007 album, Wired In My Skin providing lead vocals on the title track.

Edwards and Northrup also can be heard playing and singing together on two compilation rock albums released by the MelodicRock Records label and website.

Edwards is currently fronting Louisville, Kentucky–based rock band Bleu Phonque who released their eponymous debut album in 2018.In September 2026, Bleu Phonque performed at the annual community picnic in Kingsley Park, Louisville, Kentucky.

== Discography ==
With Buster Brown

- Loud and Clear (1984)
- Sign of Victory (1985)

With Montrose

- Mean (1987)

With King Kobra

- King Kobra III (1988)

With Foreigner

- Unusual Heat (1991)

With Royal Jelly

- Royal Jelly (1994)

With JK Northrup

- JK Northrup (2001)

With Shortino/Northrup

- Afterlife (2004) (vocals on two songs)

With JK Northrup

- Wired In My Skin (2007) (vocals on title track)

With Bleu Phonque

- Bleu Phonque (2018)
