= Palomino Club (North Hollywood) =

Music venue in California, US

The Palomino Club was a renowned music venue located in the North Hollywood neighborhood of Los Angeles. Established in 1949, it was the most prominent country music club in the city for decades before its closure in 1995. The Los Angeles Times referred to it as "Country Music's most important West Coast club" and it was honored as the national Club of the Year by the Performance magazine. In the late 1980s and 1990s, the Palomino began to feature more rock acts, including many artists associated with SST Records.

== History ==
=== 1950s and 1960s ===
Originally a "rather tough beer bar," the Palomino, located at 6907 Lankershim Boulevard, was founded by Western swing bandleader Hank Penny and his business partner Amand Gautier, had originally opened the club around 1949-50 as the Palomino. Penny staged "jazz nights" there where West Coast jazz musicians could come to jam.

It was leased in 1952 by the trio of Amos Emery ‘Pat’ Yeigh of Wyoming, who later murdered Darbi Winters, his stepdaughter, and Bill and Tom Thomas of Indiana (who later bought the club). By August 1956, shortly before Pat Yeigh sold his interest, it had become one of the Valley’s largest Western night clubs, with an area of 8,100 feet (2,500 m) with 1,400 square feet (130 m^{2}) of dancing area, featuring top-notch talent that had led to lead billing both on radio and television.

The club received a further boost in 1959 when the major country music showcase Riverside Rancho in the Silver Lake neighborhood shut down, leaving the various performers it had hosted available for the Palomino. In the early 1970s, the club could seat 400 attendees.

In addition to being the San Fernando Valley's premier night club, the Palomino Club was a neighborhood working class bar, opening at 6am with a happy hour from 8am to 10am. The Palomino Club bar stayed open during afternoon sound checks so regular customers and the artists' fans could see the bands preparing and rehearsing the evening's show for free. Often the artists showed appreciation for the fans by performing impromptu mini-concerts. The Palomino's dressing rooms and backstage areas were generally open to the public. Fans could ask if the artists were receiving visitors and most artists welcomed them, gladly signing autographs, etc. During the 1950s and 1960s, almost every notable country and western artist played there, but in the early 1970s, The Palomino began hosting performances by rock n' roll artists.

=== Rock and roll era ===
From the 1970s to the 1990s, The Palomino Club was home to the "Cow Punk" variety of country rock, breaking in acts like Freddie Brown, Rosie Flores, Omar and the Howlers, Lone Justice, Tex & The Horseheads, and The Long Ryders. Many famous artists like The Flying Burrito Brothers and Dwight Yoakam played early dates there as warm-up acts to open for artists like Carla Olson & the Textones. Emmylou Harris and her Hot Band regularly sold out the house. Novel acts like Kinky Friedman & the Texas Jewboys played there. Lyle Lovett was a regular.

Special event concerts by artists including Elvis Costello and Neil Young created sensational disturbances in the neighborhood with huge crowds outside and resulting media attention.

Unannounced guests routinely joined artists onstage for duets or jam sessions. One night George Harrison, John Fogerty and Bob Dylan joined Jesse Ed Davis and Taj Mahal onstage for an improvised mini-set of some of their hits.

Troy Walker, described as "the world’s first and only professional transgender country singer" by the L.A. Weekly, was a regular performer at the Palomino, every Tuesday night for 17 years.

Other Rock and Roll era alumni include The Everly Brothers, Phil Seymour, The Pretenders, Red Hot Chili Peppers, George Harrison, The Plimsouls, Wednesday Week, Half Way Home, Bo Diddley, The Outlaws, The Motels, The Blasters, The Ventures, Albert King, New Riders of the Purple Sage, Quiet Riot featuring Randy Rhoads, Canned Heat, Commander Cody and His Lost Planet Airmen, and Tower of Power.

It was between sets at the Palomino that on 5th April 1981 Bob Hite of Canned Heat was handed a vial of heroin by a fan. He snorted it and fell into a coma, after which others unsuccessfully attempted to revive him with a large dose of cocaine. A group of roadies put Hite in a van and drove him to bandmate Fito de la Parra's home, where he died.

In the 1970s, Rockabilly artist Jackie Lee Waukeen Cochran with Jim King on organ and bass and Robert Huber on drums and vocals could be seen once every three months. Also in the early 1970s, the country rock group called TEX with Michael Martin Murphy, bass and vocals, Owens Boomer Castleman, lead guitar and vocals, Herb Stiner, steel guitar, and Stoney Stonecipher (J.D. Stone), drums and vocals, performed, until the group split in the late 1970s.

The Palomino featured the "World Famous Palomino Talent Show" once a week, where many up and coming acts performed on their way to fame, eventually taking the form of a contest. In its final years, the Palomino Talent Show was produced and hosted by Allan Austin (aka Allan Oolo) who brought in local celebrity judges every week and found sponsors to provide prizes for the winners. The house band was The Austin Rangers, consisting of Allan Austin, Roger Wynfield, Mark Creamer, Roy Norris and Dave Olson.

The Palomino hosted various political fundraising events, most notably for California Gov. Jerry Brown's senatorial campaign in 1982.

The club hosted a punk show on December 28, 1992 headlined by Green Day, and featuring Jughead's Revenge, Scared Straight, and Strung Out.

=== Closure ===
After the death of both Bill and Tom Thomas from congenital heart defects, the club was run by Tom's wife Sherry, a former waitress at the establishment, under whose leadership the venue struggled to maintain its earlier momentum. The Palomino Club became economically strapped and was no longer able to attract high caliber acts in such a small venue. On the club's last night in business in 1995, three blues acts from southern California closed the Palomino — Jimmy O, Blue By Nature, and Stevi Lynn & Bordercrossing.

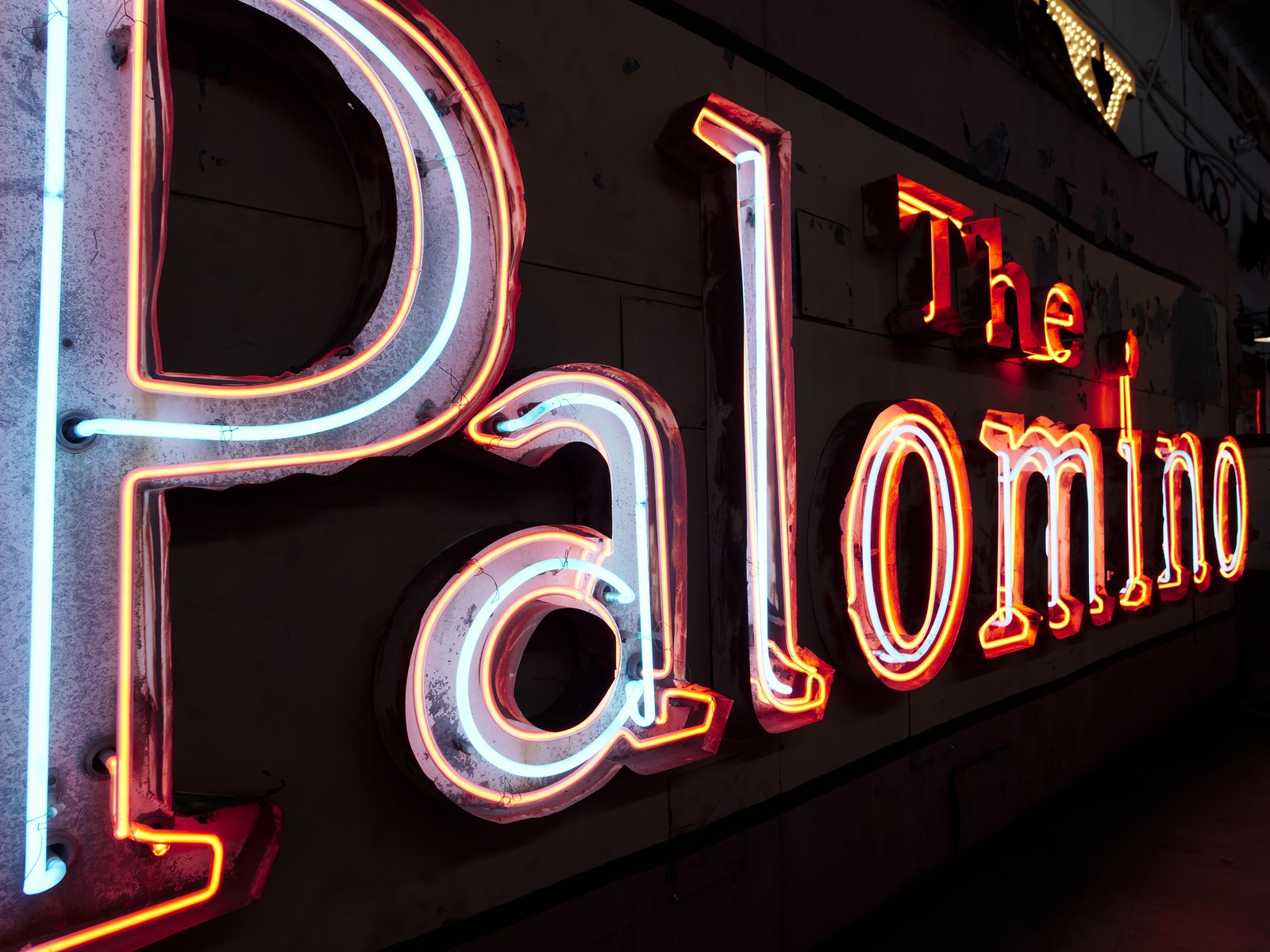
Sign displayed at the Valley Relics Museum

After the closure, The Palomino Club's large exterior neon sign went missing and was thought to have been lost, until the sign resurfaced in a warehouse in Chatsworth in 2014. Scott McNatt, the owner of the sign, realizing the sign's historical significance, contacted historian and preservationist Tommy Gelinas to save and restore the sign. The Palomino's neon has been restored and is currently on display at the Valley Relics Museum in Van Nuys, California

=== Movie and television appearances ===
The Palomino was a hangout and refuge for struggling actors and stuntmen during their salad days, including Clint Eastwood, a contract bit player at Universal, and stuntman/secondary TV cowboy Hal Needham. Both remembered the club when they gained prominence in the industry as directors and sought it as a location. The club was featured in several movies including: Every Which Way But Loose (1978) and Any Which Way You Can (1980) starring Clint Eastwood, Geoffery Lewis, Sondra Locke and Ruth Gordon; Minnie and Moskowitz (1971), directed by John Cassavetes; The Other Side of the Mountain Part 2 (1978) starring Marilyn Hassett, Timothy Bottoms, Nan Martin, Belinda J. Montgomery; Hooper (1978) starring Burt Reynolds, Jan-Michael Vincent and Sally Field; and The Junkman (1982), directed by and starring H.B. Halicki. Appearances on television include Adam-12 (1974), CHiPs and T.J. Hooker ("Finders Keepers" and "Country Action" episodes). It also is mentioned prominently multiple times in the pilot episode of The Fall Guy starring Lee Majors and guest starring Lou Rawls. Eastwood also later sat in for a set at the piano.
