= Wild Horses (American rock band) =

American band

- Origin: New York, U.S.
- Genres: Hard rock, glam metal
- Years active: 1991, 2002-2003
- Label: Atlantic

Wild Horses was an American hard rock band that originally featured former Buster Brown and Montrose members Johnny Edwards and James Kottak. The band also featured James Kottak's former Kingdom Come bandmate Rick Steier. The band went through at least two bassists: Chris Lester and Jeff Pilson.

Johnny Edwards left to sing for Foreigner and was replaced by former Shout lead vocalist John Levesque before the band recorded their first album Bareback in 1991. John Levesque sang on both of the band's official albums (Bareback and Dead Ahead).

Johnny Edwards and James Kottak previously played together on Buster Brown's second album Sign of Victory and Montrose's fifth album Mean.

Rick Steier and James Kottak previously played together on the first two Kingdom Come albums. Jeff Pilson and James Kottak previously played together on Michael Lee Firkins's self-titled album.

After the first Wild Horses album, the band split up. Several years later, Rick Steier and James Kottak joined Warrant, with which Rick Steier played on two studio albums and one live album and James Kottak played on one studio album.

After Rick Steier and James Kottak left Warrant (James Kottak left Warrant first), Wild Horses reunited and released their second album Dead Ahead in 2003.

== Discography ==
- Bareback (1991)
- Dead Ahead (2003)
