= Cornelius Schnauber =

Professor Cornelius Schnauber (April 18, 1939 – February 21, 2014) was a German-born scholar, historian, playwright, biographer, and educator. At the time of his death, he was emeritus associate professor of German at the University of Southern California (USC).

Schnauber was born near Dresden, Germany. He received his doctorate at the University of Hamburg in 1968 having studied German literature, phonetics, and political science. He was also an instructor in the Phonetics Institute of the university from 1963 to 1968. On a 2004 PBS "Life and Times" TV show, Schnauber says that his father "was an early member of the Nazi party ... He was not ambitious as though he didn't want to become one of the leaders, but when the Nazis took over, he had a good job first in the Nazi unions and then later on during the war in the Nazi Red Cross." When Schnauber's grandparents brought up the question of where the Jews were sent, his father said they were deported to another country.

After his education in Germany, Schnauber met his wife, Judith Docter, an American from Stanford, and they moved to Los Angeles. They have a son and daughter: composer and music professor Tom Schnauber, and concert singer and performing artist Christina Linhardt. In Los Angeles, Schnauber became an assistant professor of German at USC (1968–1972) and from 1972, Associate Professor of German. He was Chairman of the Department of German at USC from 1975 to 1984. In September 1984, he founded the Max Kade Institute for Austrian-German-Swiss Studies at USC and served as its founding director. He has been described by the Jewish Journal as "a leader in fostering German-Jewish relations". Professor Schnauber was the co-founder of the German-Jewish dialogue with Morris Kagan, which, for more than two decades, brought together post-WWII generation Germans and Jews for reconciliation and healing.

From 1992 on he served as the German diction coach of the Los Angeles Opera, helping to give performers a better understanding of the relationship between text and music in German operas.

As an author, Schnauber's output ranged over a wide variety of subjects—from an analysis of Hitler's Germany, Wie Hitler sprach und schrieb, Zur Psychologie der faschistischen Rhetorik (How Hitler Spoke and Wrote. The Psychology of Fascist Rhetoric), to philosophy, Pragmatischer Humanismus, Thesen Analysen Konsequenzen (Pragmatic Humanism, Theses, Analyses, Consequences), to literary criticism, Deine Träume - Mein Gedicht. Eugen Gomringer und die konkrete Poesie (Your Dreams—My Poem: Eugen Gomringer and the Concrete Poetry), to studies of European artists in Hollywood, Spaziergänge durch das Hollywood der Emigranten (Hollywood Haven, Home and Haunts of the European Emigres and Exiles in Los Angeles). He also contributed biographies of Fritz Lang, who was a close friend, and Plácido Domingo.

Dr. Schnauber wrote a number of plays including one about Richard Wagner's last days and his relations with his wife Cosima and fellow composer Felix Mendelssohn. Another production, Irma and Emma, exploring the shifting memories of two old women in a nursing home, made its debut in 2006.

Professor Schnauber was honored many times in his career including the Distinction of Honor in Gold for Services to the Republic of Austria (1979), The Federal Republic of Germany Friendship Award (1983), The Cross of the Order of Merit for the Federal Republic of Germany (1986), and Officer's Cross of the Order of Merit of the Federal Republic of Germany awarded by the President of Germany in 2002. A further honor was the 2003 "Resolution Cornelius Schnauber" from the Los Angeles City Council for "his contributions to the understanding of the cultural heritage of the City of Los Angeles and the longstanding history of friendship between Berlin and Los Angeles". These accolades rank him as one of Germany's most decorated citizens in the United States. His autobiography, Von Dresden bis Hollywood. Erinnerungen, Reflexionen und Begegnungen aus zwei Welten erzählt einer Freundin in 7 Vigilien (ISBN 3000302395) was published by Progress Media and released March 2010.
