= Kottak =

American band

- Origin: Los Angeles, California, U.S.
- Genres: Punk rock, pop punk
- Years active: 1996–?
- Past members: Jimmy Ratchitt; Michael Horvat; Stephanie Smith; Nils Wandrey; Francis Ruiz; Johhny Lucas; Price Vernon; Athena Lee

Kottak, formerly known as KrunK, was a punk rock/pop punk group formed in Los Angeles in 1996 by James Kottak a.k.a. Jimmy Ratchitt, ex-drummer for the hard rock band Scorpions, and his ex-wife Athena Lee. The band's last lineup was:

- James Kottak/Jimmy Ratchitt – lead vocals and guitar
- Nils Wandrey – bass backing vocals
- Francis Ruiz – drums

The band describe themselves as "Cheap Trick meets Green Day, on a bad day" and their album Therupy certainly continues to build the band's infamy.

In early November 1997, KrunK walked away with two awards in the 2nd Annual Rock City News Awards for bands in Los Angeles. The band was named BEST PUNK BAND, and Athena won BEST FEMALE DRUMMER. In the 7th Annual L.A. Music Awards, Athena was nominated for BEST DRUMMER (Males & Females). She was the first female ever nominated in the history of the L.A. Music Awards.

In 2006, the band changed its name from KrunK to Kottak, citing the need for a more original name now that "krunk" has become a general term.

Kottak died in January 2024 at the age of 61.

== Discography ==
- Greatist Hits (1998)
- Therupy (2006)
- Rock & Roll Forever (2010)
- Attack (2011)
