= Stone Fury =

American rock band

- Origin: Los Angeles, California, US
- Genres: Melodic rock, AOR
- Years active: 1983–1986
- Label: MCA Records
- Past members: Lenny Wolf; Bruce Gowdy; Rick Wilson; Dean Cortez; Jody Cortez; Randy Castillo

Stone Fury was an American rock band, active from 1983 to 1986.

== History ==
Lenny Wolf and Bruce Gowdy met in 1983 to found Stone Fury. Their debut album, Burns Like a Star, was released on MCA Records the following year, "to strong critical reaction but, surprisingly, few sales," although it has even invited comparisons to Led Zeppelin since. Their only single "Break Down the Wall", taken from the album, peaked at No. 47 in the US rock chart in 1984. Their sophomore effort, Let Them Talk, also saw only limited success.

Consequently, the band split up: Wolf went back to his native Germany to return to the US with his new band Kingdom Come in 1987. Gowdy went on to work with World Trade.

== Discography ==
=== Studio albums ===
- Burns Like a Star (1984)
- Let Them Talk (1986)

=== Compilation albums ===
- Best of Stone Fury (1988)

=== Singles ===
- "Break Down the Wall" (1984)
