= Christina Linhardt =

American singer, actor, and director

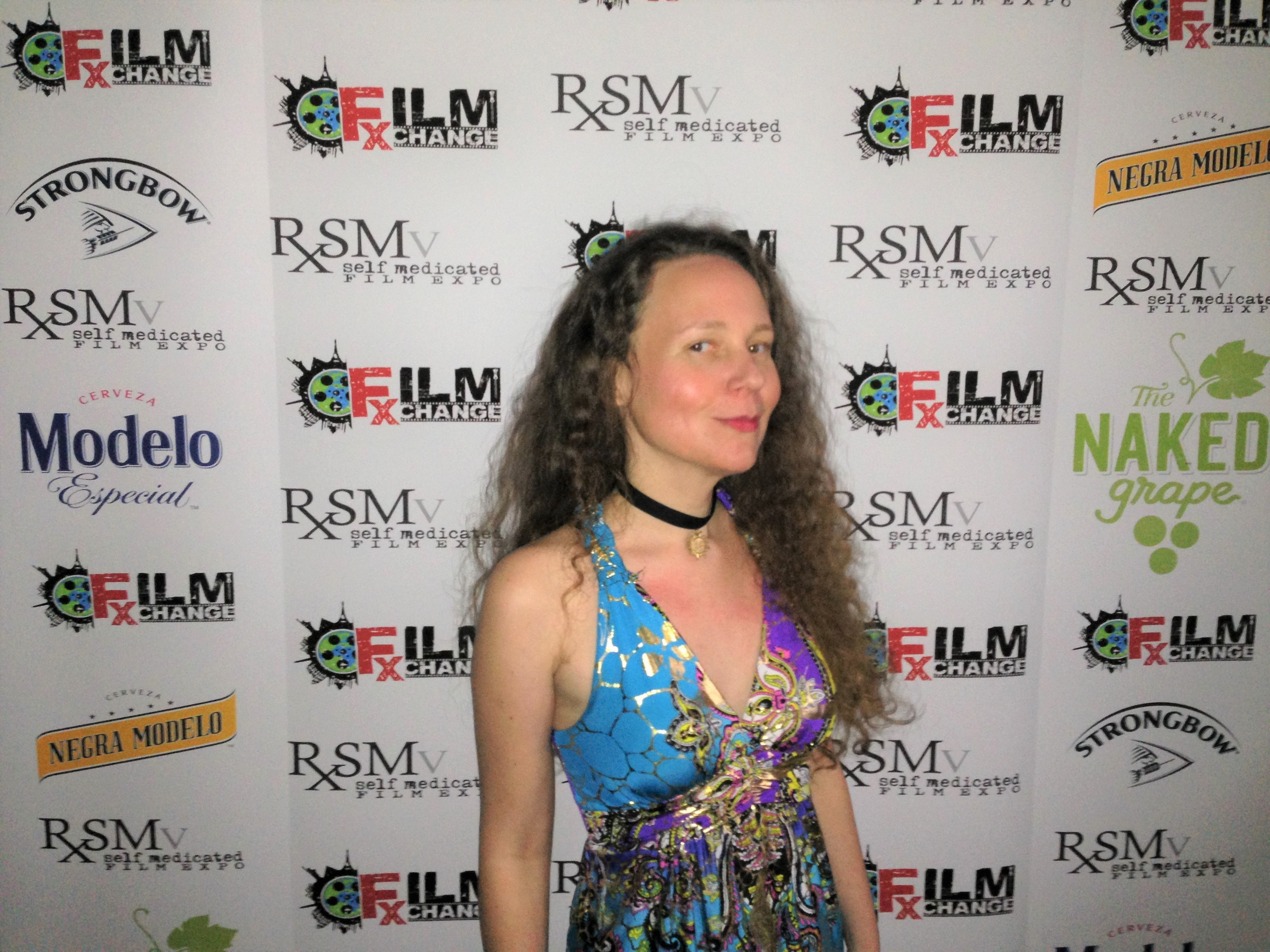
- Christina Linhardt at the RxSM Film Festival
- Born: Christine Schnauber
- Education: Bachelor of Music and Vocal Arts
- Alma mater: University of Southern California
- Awards: Hollywood F.A.M.E. Award, 2013; LA Music Award, 2015
- Website: http://circussanctuary.com/

Christina Linhardt is a German-American singer, actor, and director, best known for her roles in the production of the film Guantanamo Circus, and as the former fiancée of Prince Daniel of Saxony.

== Early life and education ==
Linhardt, born in Los Angeles, California, is the daughter of the notable German scholar, historian, playwright, and biographer Cornelius Schnauber and spent three to four months of each of her childhood years living in Germany/ Switzerland/ Austria. During this time she came to know several prominent Swiss writers including Friedrich Dürrenmatt, Hugo Loetscher, and Peter Bichsel.

She attended the Goethe Institute in Berlin, later studying French at the Eurocentre in Paris, drama and movement at Oxford University, and went on to achieve her diploma in operatic singing with a minor in theater science through the University of Southern California Thornton School of Music.

== Career ==
Lihardt produced, directed, and wrote the 2013 short film Guantanamo Circus which won a Hollywood F.A.M.E. Award for "Documentary of the Year," and was selected by the US Library of Congress for inclusion in its permanent collection. The film also won an LA Music Award for its music score by Linhardt. She directed the short film TROY! The Original Lady Boy, a documentary film about club singer Troy Walker that was selected to be in Heartland Film's "Pride Stride" event.

Linhardt is playwriting group leader of a theater therapy program for veterans in the Imagination Workshop, a non-profit organization promoting theater therapy for those suffering from mental and emotional disorders. Despite the extroverted nature of her work and life, she admits having suffered from depression.

Linhardt has released four music CDs titled Circus Sanctuary, Voodoo Princess, Fairytale Fetish (by electronica duo Volxtronic), and Come Again. She performs on vocals and flute with the Angels of Venice, and has been interviewed on LA Talk Radio, KPFK Radio and KPC Radio. She is also a staff writer for the California Philharmonic Orchestra.

In 2013 Linhardt played the role of "Party Clown" in Movie 43, and in 1999 starred opposite Maximilian Schell as narrator in a production of "Goethe's Faust Comes to Grand Avenue", a concert which was originally written by her father and for which she was also associate producer. Linhardt played "Sakina Abowath" in the 2026 movie Devil's Disciple: The Night Stalker, a role legitimized by her Romani Gypsy heritage.
