= In Your Face (Kingdom Come album) =

Studio album by Kingdom Come
- Released: April 24, 1989
- Recorded: 1989
- Studios: Goodnight LA, Van Nuys, California
- Genres: Hard rock, glam metal
- Length: 44:54
- Label: Polydor
- Producers: Keith Olsen, Lenny Wolf

Kingdom Come chronology
Kingdom Come (1988)	In Your Face (1989)	Hands of Time (1991)

Singles from In Your Face
- 1. "Do You Like It" Released: 1988; 2. "Who Do You Love" Released: 1989 (US only); 3. "Overrated" Released: 1989 (UK only)

Professional ratings
Review scores
Source	Rating
AllMusic	2.5/5 stars
Collector's Guide to Heavy Metal	8/10

In Your Face is the second album by the hard rock band Kingdom Come, released in 1989. This is the band's final album to be recorded with the original lineup of vocalist Lenny Wolf, lead guitarist Danny Stag, rhythm guitarist Rick Steier, bassist Johnny B. Frank and drummer James Kottak.

== Overview ==
Two singles were released in support of the album, both becoming minor hits in the UK: "Do You Like It" (no. 73) and "Overrated" (no. 85). The band was due to tour the UK, supporting W.A.S.P., shortly after release of the second single, but split up before the tour commenced (coincidentally, W.A.S.P. also lost guitarist and co-founder Chris Holmes at the same time, meaning they also had to cancel the tour). A third single "Stargazer" was pressed, but never officially released. The 12" and CD single versions of "Do You Like It", includes the previously unreleased "Slow Down"; a song that did not make it onto the album.

== Album title meaning ==
In an interview, the band's members talk about the title of the album, saying that when you first look at the LP, you read "Kingdom Come", then, as you move your eyes downwards, you read "In your face". They laugh and say: "Kingdom come ... in your face, get it?", making an obscene joke or double entendre of it.

== Track listing ==
No.	Title	Writer(s)	Length
1.	"Do You Like It"	Lenny Wolf, Rick Steier, Danny Stag, James Kottak, Johnny B. Frank, Marty Wolff	3:40
2.	"Who Do You Love"	Frank, Wolf, Wolff	4:14
3.	"The Wind"	Frank, Stag, Wolf, Wolff	5:01
4.	"Gotta Go (Can't Wage a War)"	Wolf, Kottak	4:25
5.	"Highway 6"	Wolf, Steier, Stag, Kottak, Frank, Wolff	5:51
6.	"Perfect 'O'"	Frank, Steier, Wolf	3:46
7.	"Just Like a Wild Rose"	Wolf, Wolff	4:32
8.	"Overrated"	Frank, Steier, Wolf	4:03
9.	"Mean Dirty Joe"	Wolf, Wolff	4:09
10.	"Stargazer"	Wolf, Steier, Stag, Frank	5:14

== Personnel ==
Kingdom Come

- Lenny Wolf – lead vocals, rhythm guitar, producer
- Danny Stag – lead guitar, acoustic guitar, backing vocals
- Rick Steier – rhythm guitar, lead guitar on "Overrated", keyboards, backing vocals
- Johnny B. Frank – bass, keyboards, backing vocals
- James Kottak – drums

Production

- Keith Olsen – producer, engineer, mixing
- Gordon Fordyce – engineer, mixing
- Shay Baby – assistant engineer
- Greg Fulginiti – mastering at Artisan Sound Recorders, Hollywood
- Hugh Syme – cover design
- Scarpati – portrait photography

== Charts ==
Chart (1989)	Peak position
Canada Top Albums/CDs (RPM)	91
Finnish Albums (The Official Finnish Charts)	40
German Albums (Offizielle Top 100)	37
Swedish Albums (Sverigetopplistan)	26
Swiss Albums (Schweizer Hitparade)	14
UK Albums (Official Charts)	25
US Billboard 200	49
