= Athena Lee =

American drummer

- Occupations: Musician, actress
- Instrument: Drums

Athena Lee is an American drummer. She is the younger sister of Mötley Crüe drummer Tommy Lee.

== Career ==
Lee is the daughter of David Lee Thomas Bass, an American U.S. Army sergeant, and Vassiliki "Voula" Papadimitriou, Miss Greece for the 1960 Miss World event. Her brother is rock drummer Tommy Lee. Athena Lee took an interest in music around age 20; two years later, she joined the all-female band Hardly Dangerous and the punk group Butt Trumpet. She then signed on and worked with KrunK. Aside from her musical career, she has also been a guest commentator on VH-1's Behind the Music and E! True Hollywood Story.

Lee was voted for, and won, "Best Female Drummer" at the Rock City Awards Show.
