= Kingdom Come (German band) =

German rock band

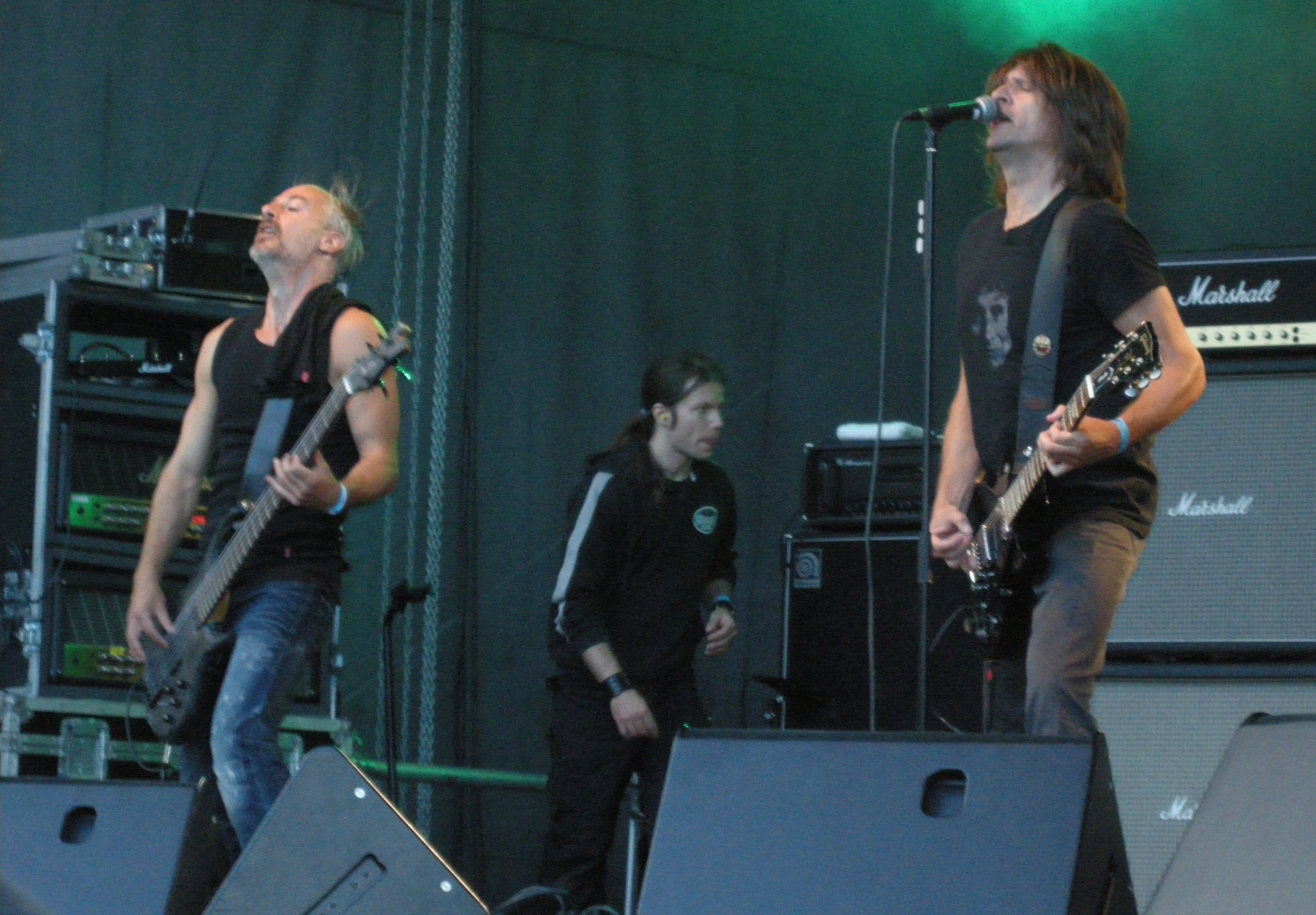
- Kingdom Come at Skogsröjet 2012

Background information
- Origin: Hamburg, West Germany
- Genres: Hard rock; heavy metal; glam metal
- Years active: 1987–1989; 1990–2016; 2018–present
- Labels: Polygram; Frontiers; CD-Maximum
- Members: Danny Stag; Rick Steier; Johnny B. Frank; Ezekiel "Zeke" Kaplan; Matt Muckle
- Past members: Lenny Wolf; Dion Murdock; Billy Liesgang; Heiko Radke-Sieb; Bam Bam Shiblei; Mirko Schaffer; Mark Cross; Blues Saraceno; Nils Finkeisen; Hendrik Thiesbrummel; James Kottak; Keith St. John
- Website: kingdomcome.de

Kingdom Come is a Germany-based hard rock band formed in 1987. The band was originally fronted by Lenny Wolf (born Frank Wollschläger in Hamburg), until their hiatus in 2016. While there have been no constant Kingdom Come members throughout the band's history, their most recent lineup features three original members who, along with drummer James Kottak, left the band in 1989 and returned in 2018. Wolf was replaced by Keith St. John in 2018, and he remained until 2024, when Ezekiel "Zeke" Kaplan replaced him. Kottak remained in Kingdom Come until his death in January of the same year and was replaced by Matt Muckle. The band's 1988 debut album, Kingdom Come, is to date their most internationally popular and biggest selling recording and features their most notable hit "Get It On".

== History ==
The group was formed in 1987 in Hamburg, West Germany, after the breakup of Wolf's moderately successful rock project Stone Fury. Wolf recruited Italian-born bassist/keyboardist Johnny B. Frank and American musicians Danny Stag (lead guitar), Rick Steier (rhythm guitar) and James Kottak (drums). Stag and Frank had previously been members of the bands Industrials, WWIII and Population 5, the latter of which included bassist Prescott Niles (The Knack) and drummer Matt Sorum (The Cult, Guns N' Roses and Velvet Revolver). Frank was also at one point the keyboard player for Josie Cotton. Kingdom Come marked the first band where Wolf sang without playing guitar. The frontman later admitted that, for a while, it was a very awkward adjustment.

In 1988, the band released its debut album, Kingdom Come. The band's first single, "Get It On", was a big enough hit on AOR stations (most requested song for six weeks), that the band's eponymous debut went gold the day it was shipped (610,000 units sold). Their second single/video for the power ballad "What Love Can Be" received much airplay on US radio and MTV. By the time the single/video "Loving You" was released, the album had sold to platinum status in the United States, Germany and Canada, among other music markets. The band was chosen to open for the North American Monsters of Rock Tour 1988, supporting Dokken, Scorpions, Metallica and Van Halen. Following that, they were tapped to support Scorpions on their North American Savage Amusement tour. In 1989, Kingdom Come released their second album In Your Face. It had sold a hardly modest 486,000 units, only 14,000 short of achieving their second gold-certified album, when the band abruptly broke up for personal reasons in August 1989.

Around 1990, Wolf reformed Kingdom Come with a new lineup, which made one more international release on PolyGram, an album entitled Hands of Time (released in 1991), co-writing with harpist/songwriter Carol Tatum (Angels of Venice), which was recorded with several session guitarists and drummers, including future Poison guitarist Blues Saraceno and former Dancer drummer Bam Bamm Shibley, with Lenny Wolf himself playing the bass. By 1993, Wolf had returned to Germany to regroup. With a new, mostly German lineup, Kingdom Come remained active with several subsequent releases and tours in Europe under their collective belt. The band had kept recording albums and touring since then. In early 2013, Kingdom Come released studio album no. 13 "Outlier", which was produced by Lenny Wolf in his home recording studio. He also planned to tour again in 2013.

In 1992, Stag joined forces with onetime Foreigner vocalist Johnny Edwards, former Krokus drummer Jeff Klaven and bassist David Seaton to form Royal Jelly, which got the attention of A&R man Denny Cordell at Island Records in 1993. Cordell signed Stag and Royal Jelly to a recording contract. The band's first single, "Ceiling", reached number 22 with a bullet on the FM airplay charts before the band was lost in the shuffle of Cordell's death from lymphoma and the purchase and restructuring of Island by PolyGram. In 1995, after the demise of the band, a disillusioned Stag went back to Pittsburgh and immersed himself in the blues, to get back in touch with the source of his inspiration. Steier and Kottak went back to Kentucky and assembled the short-lived Wild Horses, who released an album on Atlantic Records. Both would later resurface in Warrant. Kottak did not go unnoticed by Scorpions and eventually earned a place as their permanent drummer.

In 2014, the band reunited once again with guitarist Danny Stag, bassist Johnny B. Frank and drummer Hendrik Thiesbrummel for a series of concerts worldwide.

On 11 August 2016, Lenny Wolf stated that Kingdom Come was over. However, in June 2018, the original lineup of the band (minus Wolf) announced plans to tour that year and in 2019 by celebrating the 30th anniversaries of their self-titled debut album and its follow-up In Your Face; filling in for Wolf is Keith St. John, leaving no constant members throughout the band's existence. When asked in July 2018 on the "Rock Talk with Mitch Lafon" podcast about Wolf's absence, drummer James Kottak stated, "He's just kind of done. He wants to retire. He's got his life." In the same interview, Kottak expressed his desire to work on new material with Kingdom Come and added, "maybe Lenny will contribute some music towards it." Kottak later stated that Kingdom Come was not expected to release new music before 2021. In an April 2021 interview with MetalAsylum.net, vocalist Keith St. John stated that the group might consider releasing new material under a different name, due to yet-to-be solved issues with Wolf. Kottak died on 9 January 2024 at the age of 61.

A month after Kottak's death, it was announced that St. John had left Kingdom Come in order to focus on other projects, and the band revealed Ezekiel "Zeke" Kaplan and Matt Muckle as the respective replacements of St. John and Kottak. The new lineup also announced plans for 2024 that include "a new album, and a brand-new live tour."

== Comparisons with Led Zeppelin ==
The musical style on Kingdom Come's debut album was very close to the early blues-rock style of English rock band Led Zeppelin, to the point that some listeners initially thought that Kingdom Come was actually a Led Zeppelin reunion. With a sound that was thought by many to be highly derivative of Led Zeppelin's, there was a backlash from critics, with the band being dubbed "Kingdom Clone" in the press.

"Obviously it can get to the point where it gets past being a compliment and it can be rather annoying, when you've got things like Kingdom Come, actually ripping riffs right off, that's a different thing altogether."

— Led Zeppelin's guitarist and producer Jimmy Page commented in 1988

Irish rock guitarist Gary Moore went one step further, with the track "Led Clones" from his After the War album. Moore, with Ozzy Osbourne on lead vocals, pokes fun at bands such as Kingdom Come on the track, criticizing their blatant use of Led Zeppelin's sound and image.

Vocalist Lenny Wolf further inflamed the situation in an interview with Kerrang! magazine where he alleged to have never heard of Led Zeppelin. Wolf has been adamant that his and Kingdom Come's greatest influences were The Beatles and AC/DC, particularly the Bon Scott era. Danny Stag is on record as having said that his biggest influence was Jimi Hendrix. These claims are backed up by the cover of the Beatles classic "Across the Universe" from Ain't Crying for the Moon and the hard rocking tribute "Bon Scott" (in honor of the late AC/DC frontman) from the same album. Kingdom Come's other influences were Deep Purple and Rainbow.

Drummer James Kottak had stated that John Bonham was an influence on him and has "embraced the Led Zeppelin comparison anytime it came up." In an interview with KNAC radio, with Kottak disputed Wolf's alleged claim that he had never heard of Led Zeppelin: "Of course he was kidding, but sarcasm doesn't translate well to print. I remember that quote was used as the headline and most people would see that and didn't bother reading the article." In a February 2024 interview with Classic Rock, Wolf rejected his and Stag's alleged claims that they had never heard of Led Zeppelin, recalling, "Danny got so tired of hearing about the Zeppelin issue that he just blurted out: 'Who's Jimmy Page? Never heard of him.' Which of course was meant ironically, it's so obvious. But some writer picked up on it, and then other idiots jumped on the bandwagon, writing the same bullshit. And that's when the shit started."

Years later, Wolf would say that the comparisons to Led Zeppelin were "unjustified", yet "we took it as a compliment and were excited".

== Band members ==
=== Current ===
- Danny Stag – lead guitar (1987–1989, 2014–present)
- Rick Steier – rhythm guitar, keyboards (1987–1989, 2018–present)
- Johnny B. Frank – bass guitar (1987–1989, 2014–present)
- Ezekiel "Zeke" Kaplan – lead vocals (2024–present)
- Matt Muckle – drums (2024–present)

=== Former ===
- Lenny Wolf – lead vocals, guitar (1987–2016)
- James Kottak – drums, percussion (1987–1989, 2018–2024, his death)
- Dion Murdock – drums, percussion (1997)
- Billy Liesgang – guitar
- Heiko Radke-Sieb – guitar
- Bam Bam Shiblei – drums, percussion
- Mirko Schaffer – bass
- Mark Cross – drums
- Marcus Deml - guitar
- Blues Saraceno – guitar
- Nils Finkeisen – guitar
- Hendrik Thiesbrummel – drums
- Keith St. John – vocals (2018–2024)

== Discography ==
=== Studio albums ===
- Kingdom Come (1988)
- In Your Face (1989)
- Hands of Time (1991)
- Bad Image (1993)
- Twilight Cruiser (1995)
- Master Seven (1997)
- Too (2000)
- Independent (2002)
- Perpetual (2004)
- Ain't Crying for the Moon (2006)
- Magnified (2009)
- Rendered Waters (2011)
- Outlier (2013)

=== Live albums ===
- Live & Unplugged (1996)

=== Compilation albums ===
- 20th Century Masters – The Millennium Collection: The Best of Kingdom Come (2003)

=== Box sets ===
- Classic Album Collection (2019)

=== Singles ===
Title	Release	Peak chart positions		
Title	Release	US	US Main	UK
"Get It On"	1988	69	4	75
"What Love Can Be"	1988	–	26	78
"Living Out of Touch"	1988	–	27	–
"Who Do You Love"	1989	–	37	–
"Do You Like It"	1989	–	21	73
"Overrated"	1989	–	–	85
"–" denotes a recording that did not chart or was not released in that territory.
