= James Kottak =

American drummer (1962–2024)

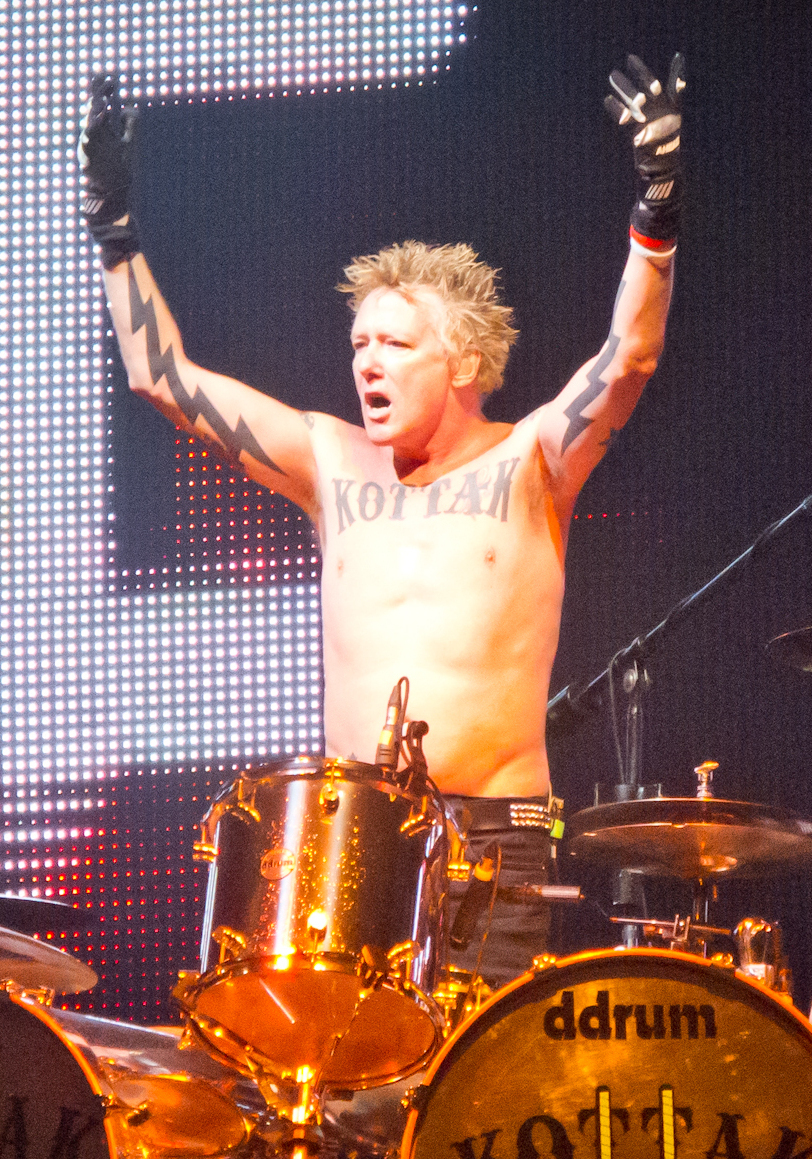
- Kottak performing in 2014

Background information
- Born: December 26, 1962; Louisville, Kentucky, U.S.
- Died: January 9, 2024 (aged 61) Louisville, Kentucky, U.S.
- Genres: Hard rock, heavy metal
- Occupation: Drummer
- Years active: 1980–2024
- Formerly of: Scorpions; Kingdom Come; Kottak; Montrose; Warrant; The Cult; Buster Brown; Wild Horses; McAuley Schenker Group; A New Revenge

James Kottak (December 26, 1962 – January 9, 2024) was an American drummer, best known for his work with the German hard rock band Scorpions, which he joined in 1996. At the time of his firing from the band in 2016, he was their longest-serving drummer. Kottak was also an original member of Kingdom Come, of whom he was their drummer from 1987 to 1989 and again from 2018 to his death in 2024.

== Career ==
Prior to joining Scorpions, Kottak was a drummer for Nuthouse, Apex, the Bob Brickley Band, Mister Charlie, Buster Brown, Montrose, Kingdom Come, Wild Horses, the McAuley Schenker Group, Warrant, and Ashba. As a teenager in Louisville, he had a strong local presence in several live bands, including the fusion group Nuthouse, which also featured his Durrett High School bandmate Don Braden (later a world-renowned jazz saxophonist). He received a music scholarship to the University of Louisville. His first instrument was the trumpet, but he later fell in love with the drums around age of 9 and started playing in local bars at the age of 15.

In 1987, Kottak was part of the band Buster Brown, a group from Louisville, Kentucky, when guitarist Ronnie Montrose recruited both Kottak and vocalist Johnny Edwards for his new album Mean. This collaboration further showcased Kottak's versatile drumming skills. That same year, Kottak relocated to Los Angeles to pursue further opportunities in the music industry, after being recommended by RATT's drummer Bobby Blotzer, who had seen him perform at a bar in Louisville.

In the follow year, Kottak gained early mainstream exposure during his time with Kingdom Come, appearing on the band's first two studio albums, the first of which included their biggest hit, "Get It On". This track prominently features Kottak's drumming, culminating in a drum solo just before the song's conclusion. Around 1990, Kottak joined The Cult, but left after the first batch of demos for their then-upcoming fifth studio album Ceremony, in which the album's drum tracks were done by Mickey Curry.

In 1993, James Kottak joined the glam metal band Warrant as their drummer, contributing to the recording of the album Ultraphobic (1995), which marked a sonic shift for the group, incorporating hard rock and grunge influences in response to the evolving music scene of the time. His tenure with the band lasted until 1996.

James Kottak joined the Scorpions in 1996, replacing longtime drummer Herman Rarebell who had left the band in 1995 to focus on other projects, and as part of the search for a new drummer, he recommended Kottak, with whom he had developed a good rapport during the Monsters of Rock Tour in 1988. At that time, Kottak was playing with Kingdom Come, a band that shared the festival lineup alongside Metallica, Dokken, Scorpions, and Van Halen.

Kottak had previously collaborated with Michael Schenker in the McAuley Schenker Group, contributing to the recording of the album MSG in 1991. His experience and versatility caught the attention of producer Keith Olsen, renowned for producing iconic albums such as Crazy World (1990) and Pure Instinct (1996) with Scorpions, as well as In Your Face (1989) with Kingdom Come. Olsen, who had previously chosen Kottak for other projects, further reinforced Rarebell's recommendation. Although Kottak did not record the Pure Instinct album, he was invited for a successful audition and officially becoming the first non-German member of the Scorpions.

In February 1997, he joined Dio on their U.S. tour by filling in for Vinny Appice for four or five shows when the latter had pneumonia. He also gave drum lessons at Far-Out Music in Jeffersonville, Indiana, once having onetime Bride drummer, Jerry McBroom as a student. He played with guitarist Michael Lee Firkins and also collaborated with DJ Ashba on his solo album "Addiction to the Friction".

That same year, James Kottak took part in a tribute album dedicated to Rod Stewart, which reimagined his classic songs with a hard rock approach. The project featured renowned musicians such as John Corabi (ex-Mötley Crüe), Eric Singer (Kiss), and Jani Lane (Warrant). Kottak contributed his drumming talents to the track “Rock My Plimsoul” with Jeff Pilson and C.C DeVille.

Kottak also played in his own band Kottak (formerly known as KrunK), serving as both the lead vocalist and guitarist, often performing with Dean guitars.

He participated in the band World War III, performing as the drummer alongside Mandy Lion (vocals), Kurt James (guitar), and Jimmy Bain (bass) during their 2009 performance at the Key Club in West Hollywood.

He had many other connections and contributions with musicians including Alan Krigger, Darren Wharton (Dare), Robbie Crane, Phil Soussan, CC DeVille and Kelly Hansen in Needle Park, Tommy Henriksen, George Lynch, Willie Basse, Uli John Roth, bassist Sean McNabb, Robin Brock and many others.

In 2013, James Kottak formed the group Project Rock with Keri Kelli, Rudy Sarzo, and Tim "Ripper" Owens. The project was conceived as a collaboration between experienced musicians to perform classic hard rock songs with new arrangements. That same year, the band toured Russia and played at several European festivals, gaining recognition for their energetic performances with a set composed by songs of Alice Cooper, Dio, Judas Priest, Scorpions and so on.

Later, the group was renamed A New Revenge and released their debut album, Enemies & Lovers, in 2019 through Golden Robot Records. The album included original tracks like "Never let you go" and "The Way", blending influences of classic hard rock with a modern approach. However, due to the members' individual commitments, the band was unable to go on a tour to promote the album.

On April 28, 2016, it was announced that Kottak would be replaced by Mikkey Dee on 12 North American headlining dates, including a run of shows at the Hard Rock Hotel in Las Vegas dubbed "Scorpions blacked out in Las Vegas". On September 12, 2016, it was announced that Kottak was no longer in the band.

Brigade
In 2017, James Kottak joined the rock 'n' roll band BRIGADE alongside renowned musicians Howard Leese (guitar), Robin McAuley (vocals), and Jason Boyleston (bass). The band stood out for their performance at the Ronnie Montrose Remembered event in 2017, a tribute to the legendary guitarist Ronnie Montrose.

In addition to his work, Kottak was also a notable presence at the Bonzo Bash, a recurring tribute event celebrating the legacy of Led Zeppelin drummer John Bonham.

Kottak endorsed Ddrum and Yamaha drums, Aquarian drumheads, Zildjian Cymbals, Ahead drumsticks, accessories and Danmar percussion and Dean guitars for his own band.

== Personal life ==
Kottak was married to Athena Bass, Tommy Lee's younger sister, who is also a drummer and was a fellow member of Kottak. The couple, married in 1996, had three children, Matthew, Tobi and Miles (drummer of the indie rock band Bad Suns). They divorced in 2010.

On April 29, 2014, the National Post reported via the Associated Press that Kottak had been arrested in Dubai and sentenced to one month in jail for offensive behavior, insulting Islam, and public drunkenness.

On September 12, 2016, he was fired from Scorpions for his alcoholism, and would later work on his recovery.

== Television, film appearances and others ==
He contributed to the book Sex Tips from Rock Stars by Paul Miles, published by Omnibus Press in July 2010.

James appeared in the reality TV series Ex-Wives of Rock, which aired from 2012 to 2014. The show focused on the lives of the ex-wives of famous rock musicians, with Athena Lee, Kottak's ex-wife, being one of the main cast members.

Additionally, Kottak was featured in the documentary film Scorpions: Forever and a Day (2015), which provides an inside look at the band's history.

== Death ==
On January 9, 2024, Kottak was found dead in his bathroom at his home in Louisville, Kentucky, at the age of 61. His exact cause of death is unknown. However, heavy metal news source Metal Sludge stated that his cause of death was believed to be cardiac arrest.

== Discography ==
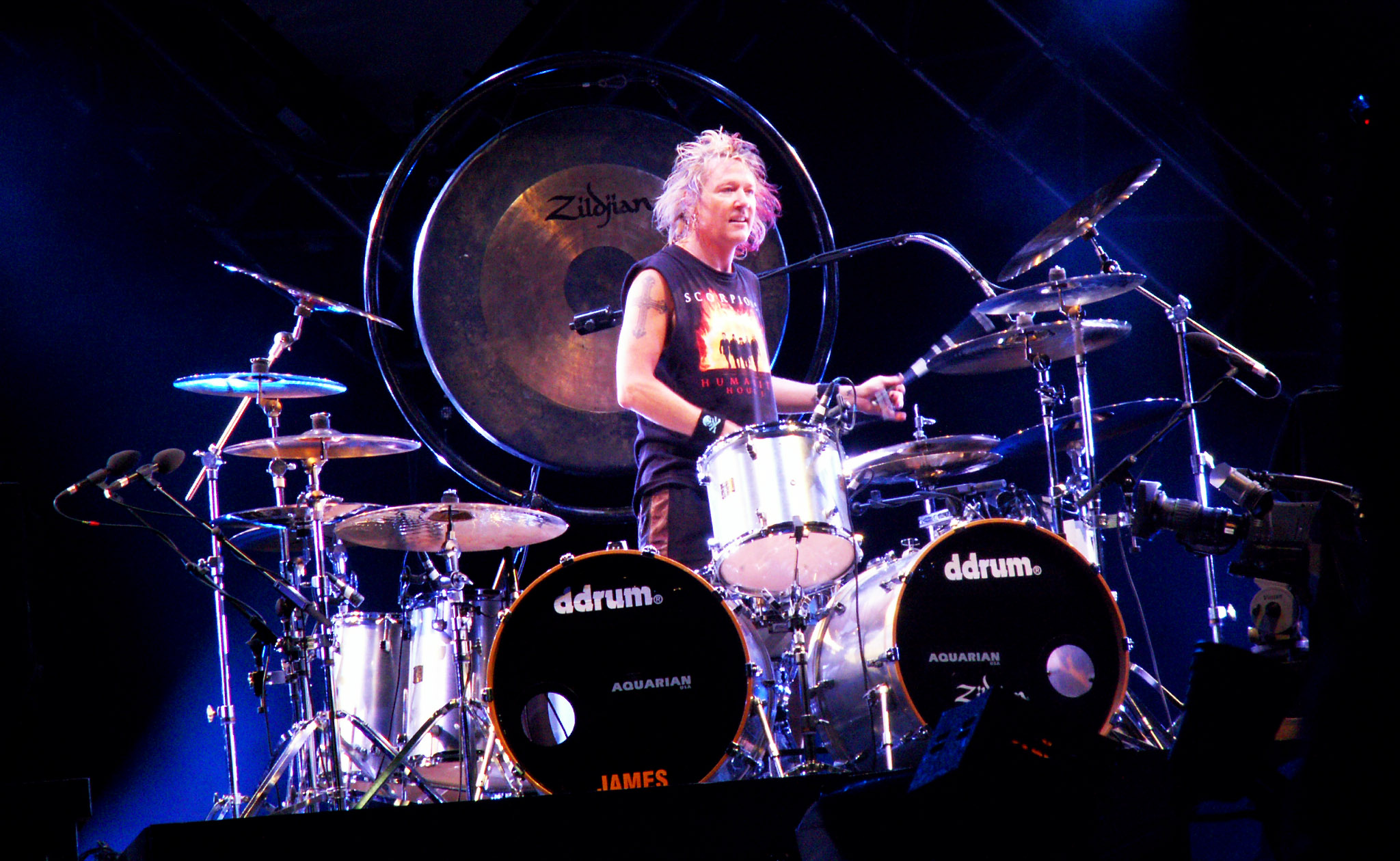
Kottak performing in 2008

=== with Buster Brown ===
- Sign of Victory (1985) (Kottak did not play on their Loud and Clear album of 1984. He replaced Bob Koestle in 1985.)

=== with Montrose ===
- Mean (1987)

=== with Kingdom Come ===
- Kingdom Come (1988)
- In Your Face (1989)

=== with Michael Lee Firkins ===
- Michael Lee Firkins (1990)

=== with No Sweat ===
- No Sweat (1990)

=== with The Cult ===
- Rare Cult (The Demo Sessions) | The Red Zone Demos ~ 1991 (2002)

=== with Dare ===
- Blood From Stone (1991) - (Additional) Musician, Drums

=== with Wild Horses ===
- Bareback (1991)
- Dead Ahead (2003)

=== with McAuley Schenker Group ===
- MSG (1991)

=== with L.A Blues Authority ===
- L.A Blues Authority (1992)

=== with Atsushi Yokozeki Project ===
- Raid (1993) - Drums on: Straight From The Heart & A Little Bit More

=== with Shortino/Northrup ===
- Back on Track (1993)

=== with Warrant ===
- Ultraphobic (1995)

=== with Ashba ===
- Addiction to the Friction (1996)

=== with Cage ===
- Cage (1996)

=== with Kottak ===
- Greatist Hits (1998)
- Therupy (2006)
- Rock & Roll Forever (2010)
- Attack (2011)

=== with Waterloo ===
- Indio (1999)

=== With Scorpions ===
- Eye II Eye (1999)
- Moment of Glory (2000)
- Acoustica (2001)
- Unbreakable (2004)
- Humanity - Hour 1 (2007)
- Sting in the Tail (2010)
- Comeblack (2011)
- MTV Unplugged – Live in Athens (2013)
- Return to Forever (2015)

=== with War & Peace ===
- Light At The End Of The Tunnel (2001)

=== with Robin Brock ===
- Hidden Power (2003)

=== with Terry Ilous ===
- Here And Gone (2007)

=== with Black Sheep ===
- Sacrifice (1998, 1999)
- Willie Basse – "Break Away" (2010)

=== with A New Revenge ===
- "Enemies & lovers" (2019)

=== with Badd Boyz ===
- "No, No, Nikkie" (2021) - (Bonus Tracks - drums on 9 to 11)

== Videography ==
Scorpions	Release year
Live in Bremerhaven	1996
Moment of Glory – Berliner Philharmoniker Live	2001
Acoustica - Live Portugal	2001
Unbreakable World Tour 2004: One Night in Vienna	2004
Live at Wacken Open Air 2006	2007
Amazônia – Live in the Jungle	2009
Get Your Sting & Blackout	2011
Scorpions - Live in Munich	2012
MTV Unplugged – Live in Athens	2013
Return to Forever — Tour Edition: Live at Hellfest & Live in Brooklyn	2015
