= Hands of Time (album) =

Studio album by Kingdom Come
- Released: June 11, 1991
- Studio: Wisseloord Studios, Hilversum, Netherlands, The Hit Factory, New York City
- Genre: Hard rock, heavy metal
- Length: 42:25
- Label: Polydor
- Producer: Lenny Wolf

Kingdom Come chronology
In Your Face (1989)	Hands of Time (1991)	Bad Image (1993)

Professional ratings
Review scores
Source	Rating
AllMusic	1/5 stars

Hands of Time is the third studio album by the hard rock band Kingdom Come, released in 1991.

== Background ==
In 1989, Kingdom Come released their second LP, In Your Face, with (initially) strong sales to rival their platinum selling debut, when the band abruptly broke up for personal reasons in August 1989.

Without the rest of the band, lead vocalist and primary songwriter Lenny Wolf chose to retain the band's name and record a third album, the band's final international release for PolyGram. Co-writing with Hands of Time songwriter Carol Tatum (Angels of Venice), Wolf recorded the album with several session guitarists and drummers, including future Poison guitarist Blues Saraceno and former Dancer drummer Bam Bamm Shibley. As well as singing and co-writing all the songs, Wolf also played bass and produced the album.

== Track listing ==
All music by Lenny Wolf, all lyrics by Wolf and Carol Tatum, except where noted

1. "I've Been Trying" (Wolf) – 4:52
2. "Should I" – 5:39
3. "You'll Never Know" – 3:26
4. "Both of Us" – 3:12
5. "Stay" – 3:09
6. "Blood on the Land" – 4:13
7. "Shot Down" – 3:09
8. "You're not the Only... I Know" – 4:16
9. "Do I Belong" – 3:32
10. "Can't Deny" (Wolf, Marty Wolff) – 3:29
11. "Hands of Time" – 3:27

== Personnel ==
Kingdom Come

- Lenny Wolf – lead vocals, guitar, bass, guitar solos on tracks 1 and 5, producer, mixing

Additional musicians

- Blues Saraceno – guitar solos on tracks 3, 9 and 10
- Marco Moir – guitar solo on track 2
- Bert Meulendijk – guitar solo on track 8
- Koen van Baal – keyboards
- Jimmy Bralower, Steve Burke – drums

Production

- Gary Lyons – engineer, mixing on tracks 2, 4, 7, 10 and 11 at Wisseloord Studios
- Albert Boekholt – assistant engineer
- Dave Bianco – mixing of tracks 1, 3, 5, 6, 8, 9 at The Hit Factory
- Joe Pirrera – mixing assistant

== Charts ==
Chart (1991)	Peak position
Swedish Albums (Sverigetopplistan)	50
Swiss Albums (Schweizer Hitparade)	31
