= Bareback (album) =

Studio album by Wild Horses
- Released: 1991
- Recorded: 1991
- Genre: Hard rock, glam metal
- Length: 46:27
- Label: Atlantic

Wild Horses chronology
Bareback (1991)	Dead Ahead (2003)

Professional ratings
Review scores
Source	Rating
Allmusic	4.5/5 stars

Bareback is the first album by the American rock band Wild Horses.

Shortly before the recording of this album, former Shout lead vocalist John Levesque replaced the band's original lead vocalist Johnny Edwards, who left to replace Lou Gramm in the band Foreigner.

The band split up after the release of this album. They eventually reunited in 2002, recording their second album Dead Ahead, which was released in 2003.

Bassist Jeff Pilson is credited as an additional musician. There are claims that he actually played all of the bass on the album.

Jeff Pilson and James Kottak had previously played together in Michael Lee Firkins's backing band and later played together in the McAuley Schenker Group.

== Track listing ==
1. "Cool Me Down"
2. "Had Enough Of Your Love"
3. "Your Love Is Junk"
4. "The River Song"
5. "Fire And Water"
6. "N.Y.C. Heartbreak"
7. "Whiskey Train"
8. "Tougher Than Love"
9. "Day In The Sun"
10. "Matter Of The Heart"
11. "Burn It Up"
12. "Tell Me Something Good"

== Personnel ==
- John Levesque: lead vocals, guitars
- Rick Steier: lead guitar, vocals
- James Kottak: drums, vocals
- Chris Lester: bass, vocals (credited but doesn’t play on the album)

=== Additional Personnel ===
- Jeff Pilson: bass on all tracks
- Darren Wharton: keyboards
