= Lenny Wolf =

German musician

- Born: Frank Wollschläger; 11 March 1962 (age 64); Hamburg, West Germany
- Genres: Glam metal, heavy metal
- Occupations: Singer, musician, songwriter
- Instruments: Vocals, guitar
- Years active: 1982–2018
- Formerly of: Stone Fury, Kingdom Come

Frank Wollschläger (born 11 March 1962), known professionally as Lenny Wolf, is a retired German singer and musician, best known as the former lead singer of the hard rock band Kingdom Come. In addition to songwriting and lead vocals, he played multiple instruments on various Kingdom Come albums. He also collaborated on the song "Eyes of Time", from The Final Experiment, the debut album by Arjen Anthony Lucassen's project Ayreon. He was also a member of the bands Germany in 1982 featuring Dieter Büttner, Andreas Daniels, Miroslav Šupica, and the band Stone Fury between 1984 and 1986 featuring Bruce Gowdy, Rick Wilson Jody Cortez and Vinnie Colaiuta.

== Early years ==
Prior to forming the successful Kingdom Come, Lenny had moved from Germany to Los Angeles in 1983 signing with MCA Records with a band called Stone Fury. Along with Bruce Gowdy, Stone Fury released two critically acclaimed records in 1984 and 1986, but struggled to attract mainstream attention.

== Kingdom Come ==
In 1988, Lenny signed a new deal with Polygram and per their request, was asked to put a new band together. It consisted of: lead guitarist Danny Stag, rhythm guitar Rick Steier, bassist Johnny B. Frank, and drummer James Kottak. The band saw immediate success with the release of their eponymous debut album Kingdom Come, shooting to number 12 on the Billboard 200 and reaching sales at approximately 2 million worldwide. The band was also chosen to participate in the Monsters of Rock Tour 1988.

The band came under intense criticism for being a Led Zeppelin-soundalike. Years later, Wolf would say that the comparisons were "unjustified," yet "we took it as a compliment and were excited."

In March 2018, it was reported that Wolf was in the process of reforming the original Kingdom Come lineup for both a new album and tour. However, when the original lineup of Kingdom Come announced a 30th anniversary reunion tour in June 2018, Wolf declined to participate, for personal reasons, and was replaced by Keith St John. In a July 2018 interview, drummer James Kottak revealed that Wolf was "just kind of done. He wants to retire. He's got his life."

== Discography ==
=== Studio albums ===
- Lenny Wolf's Germany (1989)
- Lenny Wolf (1999)

=== with Stone Fury ===
- Burns Like a Star (1984)
- Let Them Talk (1986)

=== with Kingdom Come ===
- Kingdom Come (1988)
- In Your Face (1989)
- Hands of Time (1991)
- Bad Image (1993)
- Twilight Cruiser (1995)
- Master Seven (1997)
- Too (2000)
- Independent (2002)
- Perpetual (2004)
- Ain't Crying for the Moon (2006)
- Magnified (2009)
- Rendered Waters (2011)
- Outlier (2013)
