= Guantanamo Circus =

2013 documentary

- Directed by: Christina Linhardt, Michael L. Rose
- Written by: Christina Linhardt, Michael L. Rose
- Produced by: Christina Linhardt, Michael L. Rose
- Edited by: Dora Rosas
- Music by: Christina Linhardt
- Release date: 28 October 2013
- Running time: 27 minutes
- Language: English

Guantanamo Circus is a half-hour documentary film released in 2013 directed by Christina Linhardt and Michael L. Rose. It records the arrival and five-day experience of a troupe of circus performers at Guantanamo Bay Naval Base to perform their circus act for the American soldiers stationed at the American military base located there. The film reveals a glimpse of day-to-day life on the base as seen through the eyes of the visiting performers, and is used as a reference by the Guantánamo Public Memory Project.

The film won a Hollywood F.A.M.E. Award for "Documentary of the Year," and was selected by the Library of Congress for inclusion in its permanent collection. It also won an LA Music Award for its music score by Linhardt.
