= Eurocentres =

Language literacy organization

Eurocentres Global Language Learning
- Type: Private
- Founded: 1948
- Headquarters: London, England, United Kingdom
- Key people: CEO, Stephan Roussounis
- Products: Language (English and French) and 21st Century skills, Language Learning, Exam & University preparation courses, teaching preparation, Government consulting
- Website: www.eurocentres.com

Eurocentres – Global Language Learning was an international language teaching organization with 20 language schools in 13 countries. The company was acquired in 2020 by Bayswater Education and fully rebranded in 2023.

== History ==
The first Eurocentres Language School was founded in 1948 by a Swiss, Erhard Waespi, in Bournemouth and is probably the oldest language school still operating on England's south coast. In 1960, he handed over his five schools for English (Bournemouth, London), French (Lausanne), German (Cologne – now Berlin), and Italian (Florence), to the Eurocentres Foundation, which he then managed for another 20 years. In 1970, Eurocentres acquired Davies' Schools of English at Cambridge. After 2000, Eurocentres began to expand outside of Europe.

The Eurocentres Global Language Learning has been a consultant to the Council of Europe for the development of the Common European Framework of Reference for language teaching and learning.

For 72 years, Eurocentres was a Foundation Institution owned by Migros Cultural Percentage. The aims foundation implied to promote understanding between people and bridge national, cultural and social barriers.

In 2018, Eurocentres is part of the German firm Education & Career group.

In 2020, Eurocentres was acquired by Bayswater Education, who rebranded the schools to Bayswater in January 2023.

== Pioneer Period: 1948–1960 ==
1948: Erhard Waespi opens the first Eurocentres school in Bournemouth.

1959: The early Eurocentres schools come to the attention of the Federation of Migros Cooperatives. Founder Gottlieb Duttweiler takes over and opens three new centres in Florence, Barcelona, and Cologne. 1960: Duttweiler forms an independent Foundation under the Eurocentres name, creating a number of what he terms 'European Language and Educational Centres'. The total number of students studying with the Foundation rises to 4,300.

== Initial Expansion Period: 1960–1975 ==
1960: Collaboration with France, Spain, and the USA begins.

1968: Eurocentres receives the "Statut Consultatif de la Catégorie 1" – advisory status in the field of language teaching and learning – from the Council of Europe.

1975: The number of students exceeds 20,000 per year.

== Implementation Period: 1975–1985 ==
1975: The first purpose-built school in London.

1984: Eurocentres Cambridge, the second model school for teaching adults, follows.

== Second Expansion Period: 1986–1999 ==
1986: The first purpose-built school for teaching German opens in Cologne.

1988: New center's are opened in countries outside of Europe, including the United States and Japan.

1990: Eurocentres aids in the development of the CEFR (Common European Framework of Reference for Languages) and is commended by the Council of Europe Language Policy Unit for its contributions.

1991: With the completion of a new purpose-built school in La Rochelle, there are now 3 year-round schools in France – Paris, Amboise, and La Rochelle.

1993: The "Eurocentres Scale of Language Proficiency" is put into practice. It is followed by the development of a computerised language testing system which enables teachers to generate reliable tests according to students' individual needs.

1995: The first consultancy agreements take shape in Switzerland, Spain, and Brazil.

1999: International collaboration leads to partnerships in Canada and Malta.

== Third Expansion Period: 2001–2018 ==
2002: There are now two Eurocentres schools in Canada, and further partnerships develop with schools in Malta, Australia and Spain.

2005: There are now two Eurocentres schools across Australia and a centre opens in Auckland, New Zealand.

2006: Cape Town, South Africa, opens its own center.

2007: A new school for teaching German opens in Berlin.

2008: The Eurocentres school network in Australia is completed with the opening of Eurocentres Sydney.

2018: All Eurocentres' English and French activities, including schools in the UK, France, a franchise network, and teaching provisions across the world have been acquired by German firm Education & Career group. he said.

== Acquisition and Rebrand ==
Following a period of financial difficult exacerbated by the global pandemic of 2020, Eurocentres was acquired by Bayswater Education. Eurocentres London was merged with Bayswater's London premises. Centres in Brighton, Bournemouth, Cambridge, Paris and Cape Town were also rescued. Eurocentres Cambridge closed in March 2023. All remaining Eurocentres schools now trade under the Bayswater brand name.

== Schools ==
Eurocentres offered languages schools in the UK and Ireland (London, Bournemouth, Brighton, Cambridge, Dublin and Galway); Australia (Cairns); Canada (Toronto, Lunenburg and Vancouver); United States (San Diego); France (Paris and La Rochelle), South Africa (Cape Town); Malta (Pembroke); Australia (Perth, Sydney, Brisbane and Melbourne); New Zealand (Auckland)); United States (Alexandria, New York and East Lansing); Malta (Sliema); France (Amboise); Switzerland (Lausanne); Spain (Barcelona, Valencia and Marbella); Germany (Berlin); Italy (Florence); Japan (Yokohama-Kanazawa); China (Beijing); Turkey (Istanbul) and Russia (Moscow and Saint Petersburg); .

== Courses ==
Eurocentres offered a variety of language courses from general language instruction, exam preparation (IELTS, Cambridge FCE, Cambridge CAE, Cambridge CPE, TOEFL, DELF, DALF), to Business and Language instruction, work and study programs, and culture courses.
