= Karen Tobin =

American singer-songwriter

- Origin: Pennsylvania, United States
- Genre: Country
- Occupation: singer
- Instrument: Vocals
- Years active: 1984–present
- Labels: Arista, Atlantic, Big Otis, Sunnyland
- Website: karentobinmusic.com

Karen Tobin (born in Pennsylvania) is a female, American country music singer.

== Formative years ==
Born in Pennsylvania, Tobin received training in classical music at the Bryn Mawr Conservatory of Music in Bryn Mawr.

== Career ==
Tobin began her professional career as a singer in San Francisco, where she became a featured vocalist on the final album released by Hot Tuna. She also later served as a backup singer for Poco.

After relocating to Los Angeles, California in 1980, Tobin was signed to Arista Records. She released two singles for the label, but no album was ever released. After being discovered by Keith Stegall, she recorded several demos before being signed to a recording contract with Atlantic Records Nashville in 1991. Tobin's debut album, Carolina Smokey Moon, was released in October 1991. The album's first single, the title-track, was made into a video which received airplay on CMT and TNN.

== Discography ==
=== Albums ===
Title	Details
Carolina Smokey Moon	Release date: October 1, 1991; Label: Atlantic Records
Karen Tobin & Crazy Hearts	Release date: 1992; Label: Big Otis Records
That's What You Get	Release date: August 19, 2003; Label: Sunnyland Productions

"Before It's Too Late"

- Release date: May 5, 2018
- Label: Sunnyland Productions

=== Singles ===
Year	Title	Album
1984	"I Don't Want to Be Lonely"	—N/a
1985	"If You Think You Know How to Love Me"	—N/a
1991	"Carolina Smokey Moon"	Carolina Smokey Moon
1992	"Love from a Heart of Stone"	Carolina Smokey Moon
1992	"Picture of Your Daddy"	Carolina Smokey Moon
