= Bad Image =

Studio album by Kingdom Come
- Released: August 6, 1993
- Studio: Kiva-West Studio, Los Angeles, California; Château du Pope, Hamburg, Germany
- Genre: Hard rock, heavy metal
- Length: 45:59
- Label: WEA
- Producer: Lenny Wolf

Kingdom Come chronology
Hands of Time (1991)	Bad Image (1993)	Twilight Cruiser (1995)

Black Label Edition

Professional ratings
Review scores
Source	Rating
AllMusic	2/5 stars
Collector's Guide to Heavy Metal	6/10

Bad Image is the fourth studio album by Kingdom Come.

== Track listing ==
All songs by Lenny Wolf, except lyrics on "Friends" by Wolf and Carol Tatum

1. "Passion Departed" – 4:50
2. "You're the One" – 5:20
3. "Fake Believer" – 3:49
4. "Friends" – 4:38
5. "Mad Queen" – 4:13
6. "Pardon the Difference (But I Like It)" – 1:51
7. "Little Wild Thing" – 3:19
8. "Can't Resist" – 5:02
9. "Talked Too Much" – 3:22
10. "Glove of Stone" – 5:01
11. "Outsider" – 4:35

== Personnel ==
Kingdom Come

- Lenny Wolf – lead vocals, rhythm guitar, guitar solos, bass, producer

Additional musicians

- Billy Liesgang, Heiko Radke-Sieb – guitar solos
- Kai Fricke – drums

Production

- Paul McKenna – engineer at Kiva-West Studio
- Brian Soucy – assistant engineer
- Jeo Wildhack, Michael Tibes – engineers at Château du Pope

== Charts ==
Chart (1993)	Peak position
German Albums (Offizielle Top 100)	74
