= Bruce Gowdy =

American guitarist

Bruce Betts Gowdy is an American guitarist, best known for his work with World Trade, Stone Fury, and Unruly Child.

== Biography ==
Early work included being the lead guitarist in the short-lived science fiction themed Disneyland rock band Halyx, for which he composed some of the original songs.

Gowdy was a founding member of World Trade with Billy Sherwood and Guy Allison. He and Sherwood were temporarily proposed as replacements for Trevor Rabin and Jon Anderson respectively in Yes in the late 1980s.

Allison and Gowdy continued writing together, which led to the formation of Unruly Child. He was also a member of Stone Fury and has worked with musician Mercedes. He also worked with Glenn Hughes, including co-producing his From Now On... album from 1994.

He toured with the Japanese rock star Eikichi Yazawa for over a decade.

== Discography ==
=== with Stone Fury ===
- Burns Like a Star (1984)
- Let Them Talk (1986)

=== with World Trade ===
- World Trade (1989)
- Euphoria (1995)
- Unify (2017)

=== with Unruly Child ===
- Unruly Child (1992)
- Tormented (1995)
- Waiting for the Sun (1998)
- UCIII (2003)
- Worlds Collide (2010)
- Down the Rabbit Hole (2014)
- Can't Go Home (2017)
- Big Blue World (2019)
- Our Glass House (2020)

=== with Glenn Hughes ===
- From Now On... (1994)
- Feel (1995)

=== Other ===
- Coneheads Original Soundtrack, track "Conehead Love" (1993)
- James Christian: Rude Awakening, track "Best Girl" (1995)
- Bobby Kimball: Rise Up (1996)
- Fergie Frederiksen: Equilibrium (1999)
- Billy Sherwood: The Big Peace (1999)
