= Danny Stag =

American musician

- Birth name: Danny Steigerwald
- Born: Pittsburgh, Pennsylvania
- Genres: Glam metal, heavy metal
- Occupation: Musician
- Instrument: Guitar

Danny Stag (born Daniel Steigerwald in Pittsburgh, Pennsylvania) is an American hard rock guitarist who played with the band Kingdom Come. Stag is noted for his soulful blues rock playing, a style that by the late 1980s had been somewhat of a lost art, with many hard rock guitarists at the time playing with a more technical approach.

Prior to joining Kingdom Come, Stag played and recorded in L.A. based bands Industrials, produced by Kim Fowley, Population 5, and WWIII; along with future Kingdom Come bandmate, Johnny B. Frank, a former keyboard player for Josie Cotton. Stag's big break in the music industry came shortly after his good friend Johnny B. Frank was chosen to play in Lenny Wolf's new band Kingdom Come. Wolf had asked Frank if he knew any blues guitarists and Frank recommended Stag. At the audition, Wolf asked Stag to improvise a solo for their upcoming single, "What Love Can Be," which resulted in Stag landing the lead guitar duties for Kingdom Come. The band's debut album Kingdom Come quickly climbed the billboard charts peaking at number 12, with worldwide sales greatly exceeding one million copies. Kingdom Come were one of five bands selected (Scorpions, Metallica, Van Halen, and Dokken, the others) to appear on the Monsters of Rock Tour 1988. Of the several tour dates included a stop in Stag's hometown of Pittsburgh, where the band played in front of over 30,000 people at the Three Rivers Stadium. The band capped off a busy 1988 with a show headlined by Bon Jovi in Tokyo on December 31.

The following year, Kingdom Come released In Your Face, The album broke into the top 50 of the Billboard 200 and the album had sold over 486,000 copies when the band suddenly broke up in August 1989, while in the middle of a co-headlining tour with the band Warrant.

Upon leaving Kingdom Come, Stag would later resurface with the band Royal Jelly, (Island Records, 1994). While on tour in America in 2008 during Rocklahoma, Lenny Wolf and the classic lineup of Kingdom Come reunited for a one-off gig at a Los Angeles club, Stag was the only member not present at the reunion. He is the younger brother of former Pittsburgh Penguins TV play-by-play man Paul Steigerwald, former KDKA-TV Sportscaster John Steigerwald and ex-Pittsburgh newspaper writer/editor and author Bill Steigerwald.

== Discography ==
=== With The Industrials ===
- The Industrials (1980)

=== With Kingdom Come ===
- Kingdom Come (1988)
- In Your Face (1989)

=== With Royal Jelly ===
- Royal Jelly (1994)
