= FireHouse discography =

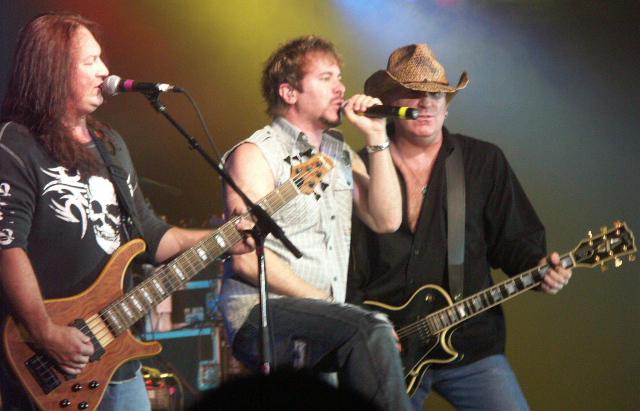
FireHouse in 2007

FireHouse is an American glam metal band formed in Richmond, Virginia, in 1984 under the name White Heat. The band has released seven studio albums, a live album, two video albums, 11 singles and nine music videos. FireHouse signed a deal with Epic Records in 1989 and released their self-titled debut the following year. It reached double platinum in the States and reached gold in other countries. The record spawned four singles and launched the group into their sophomore effort, which reached platinum in the US. Hold Your Fire spawned three singles. Their third release, aptly titled 3, spawned their final two singles. They would go on to release an acoustic album, a live album, three albums that held no chart positions, a greatest hits compilation and a re-recorded album of their hits. C. J. Snare has stated they have sold over seven million worldwide albums. C. J. Snare died on April 5, 2024, from cardiac arrest after suffering from colon cancer.

== Albums ==
=== Studio albums ===
Year	Album details	US 200	Certifications
1990	FireHouse: Released: September 11, 1990; Label: Epic; Format: LP, cassette, CD	21	US: 2× Platinum; CAN: Gold; RIAJ: Gold; RIAS (Singapore): Gold
1992	Hold Your Fire: Released: June 8, 1992; Label: Epic; Format: LP, cassette, CD	23	RIAA: Gold
1995	3: Released: April 11, 1995; Labels: Epic/Sony; Format: LP, cassette, CD	66	
1996	Good Acoustics: Released: October 1, 1996; Labels: Epic/Sony; Format: LP, cassette, CD	—	RIM: Gold; PARI: Gold; TECA (Thailand): Gold
1998	Category 5: Released: September 2, 1998; Label: Lightyear; Format: LP, cassette, CD	—	
2000	O2: Released: November 7, 2000; Label: Spitfire; Format: LP, cassette, CD	—	
2003	Prime Time: Released: August 12, 2003; Label: Spitfire; Format: CD	—	

=== Live albums ===
- Bring 'Em Out Live (1999)

=== Compilation albums ===
- The Best of FireHouse (1998)
- Super Hits: The Best of FireHouse (2000)
- Playlist: The Very Best of FireHouse (2003)
- Full Circle (2011)

=== Video albums ===
Album	Release date	Format
FireHouse: Rock on the Road	October 1991	VHS; DVD

== Singles ==
Year	Song	US	US Rock	US AC	AUS	CAN	UK	Album
1990	"Shake & Tumble"	—	—	—	—	—	—	FireHouse
1991	"Don't Treat Me Bad"	19	16	—	57	35	71	FireHouse
1991	"Love of a Lifetime"	5	—	37	97	30	—	FireHouse
1991	"All She Wrote"	58	25	—	169	—	—	FireHouse
1992	"Reach for the Sky"	83	27	—	192	—	—	Hold Your Fire
1992	"When I Look into Your Eyes"	8	—	—	140	20	65	Hold Your Fire
1992	"Sleeping with You"	78	—	—	—	—	—	Hold Your Fire
1995	"I Live My Life for You"	26	—	20	—	17	—	3
1995	"Love Is a Dangerous Thing"	—	—	—	—	—	—	3
1995	"Here for You"	108	—	—	—	—	—	3
1998	"Bringing Me Down"	—	—	—	—	—	—	Category 5

== Music videos ==
- All She Wrote – © 1991 Sony Music Entertainment
- Don't Treat Me Bad – © 1991 Sony Music Entertainment
- Overnight Sensation – © 1991 Sony Music Entertainment
- Love of a Lifetime – © 1991 Sony Music Entertainment
- Reach for the Sky – © 1992 Sony Music Entertainment
- Sleeping With You – © 1992 Sony Music Entertainment
- When I Look Into Your Eyes – © 1992 Sony Music Entertainment
- Here For You – © 1995 Sony Music Entertainment
- I Live My Life For You – © 1995 Sony Music Entertainment
