= Full Circle (FireHouse album) =

Studio album by FireHouse
- Released: June 7, 2011 (US); May 21, 2012 (Japan and South Korea)
- Genres: Hard rock; glam metal
- Length: 46:34
- Label: FireHouse Music
- Producer: Bill Leverty

FireHouse chronology
Prime Time (2003)	Full Circle (2011)

Full Circle is a 2011 compilation studio album by American rock band FireHouse. It consists of re-recorded material from the band's previous releases. The album features all original members excluding bassist Perry Richardson, and replacing him with ex-Jani Lane bassist Allen McKenzie, thus making the album the first to feature McKenzie on bass.

Full Circle consists of five tracks from their debut, FireHouse, three tracks from their sophomore effort Hold Your Fire, one track from their third release aptly titled 3, one track from their acoustic release Good Acoustics, and one track from The Best of FireHouse compilation.

The album spawned a tour covering the United States, Japan, Thailand, Indonesia, Puerto Rico, Brazil, Peru, South Korea, Portugal, and India.

It was the band's final album to feature longtime lead vocalist C.J. Snare who died in April 2024.

== Track listing ==
No.	Title	Original album	Writers	Length
1.	"Overnight Sensation"	FireHouse	Cosby Ellis; Michael Foster; Bill Leverty; C. J. Snare	3:55
2.	"Shake & Tumble"	FireHouse	Foster; Leverty; Perry Richardson; Snare	3:46
3.	"Hold the Dream"	Hold Your Fire	Leverty; Snare	5:00
4.	"All She Wrote"	FireHouse	Leverty; Snare	3:45
5.	"Love of a Lifetime"	FireHouse	Leverty; Snare	4:45
6.	"Don't Treat Me Bad"	FireHouse	Ellis; Foster; Leverty; Snare	3:55
7.	"Reach for the Sky"	Hold Your Fire	Leverty; Snare	4:46
8.	"When I Look into Your Eyes"	Hold Your Fire	Leverty; Snare	4:00
9.	"You Are My Religion"	Good Acoustics	Leverty; Snare	4:02
10.	"I Live My Life for You"	3	Leverty; Snare	4:24
11.	"Christmas with You"	The Best of FireHouse	Leverty; Snare	4:15

== Personnel ==
- C. J. Snare – vocals, keyboards
- Bill Leverty – guitar, backing vocals
- Allen McKenzie – bass, backing vocals
- Michael Foster – drums, percussion, backing vocals

=== Production ===
- Bill Leverty – producer, engineering

== See also ==
- FireHouse discography
