= Bring 'Em Out Live =

Live album by FireHouse
- Released: December 17, 1999 in Japan
- Recorded: April 22, 1999 in Osaka, Japan
- Genre: Hard rock
- Labels: Pony Canyon; Spitfire

FireHouse chronology
Category 5 (1998)	Bring 'Em Out Live (1999)	O_{2} (2000)

Professional ratings
Review scores
Source	Rating
AllMusic	2.5/5 stars

Bring 'Em Out Live is the first live album of the American rock band FireHouse. This is the band's last recording material to feature Perry Richardson playing bass guitar.

== Track listing ==
1. "Intro"
2. "Overnight Sensation"
3. "All She Wrote"
4. "Lover's Lane"
5. "Hold Your Fire"
6. "Dream"
7. "When I Look into Your Eyes"
8. "Acid Rain"
9. "Bringing Me Down"
10. "Don't Walk Away"
11. "Love of a Lifetime"
12. "Reach for the Sky"
13. "I Live My Life for You"
14. "Here for You"
15. "Don't Treat Me Bad"

== Personnel ==
- C.J. Snare – vocals, keyboards
- Bill Leverty – guitars
- Michael Foster – drums
- Perry Richardson – bass guitar
