= Good Acoustics =

Studio album by FireHouse
- Released: October 8, 1996
- Recorded: 1996
- Studio: Telstar Studios (Sarasota, Florida)
- Genres: Acoustic rock; country rock; hard rock; glam metal
- Length: 43:39
- Labels: Epic; Sony
- Producer: FireHouse

FireHouse chronology
3 (1995)	Good Acoustics (1996)	Category 5 (1998)

Professional ratings
Review scores
Source	Rating
AllMusic	2.5/5 stars

Good Acoustics is the fourth studio album by the hard rock band FireHouse. It was released in 1996 on Epic Records. The album featured acoustic versions of several of the band's biggest hits. However, it also featured four new songs (one being an Eagles cover song which was the band's remake of the Eagles' cover of Steve Young's Seven Bridges Road).

== Track listing ==
All songs written by Bill Leverty and C.J. Snare, except where noted.

1. "You Are My Religion" – 4:03
2. "Love Don't Care" – 4:42
3. "In Your Perfect World" – 4:08
4. "No One at All" – 3:34
5. "Love of a Lifetime" – 4:42
6. "All She Wrote" – 3:46
7. "When I Look into Your Eyes" – 4:04
8. "Don't Treat Me Bad" (Ellis, Foster, Leverty, Snare) – 4:18
9. "Here for You" – 3:53
10. "I Live My Life for You" – 4:22
11. "Love of a Lifetime" (country rock version) – 4:09
12. "Seven Bridges Road" (Steve Young) – 2:39

== Charts ==
Chart (1996)	Peak position
Japanese Albums (Oricon)	37

== Certification ==
Country	Certification
Malaysia	Gold
Thailand	Gold
Philippines	Gold

== Personnel ==
- C.J. Snare – vocals, keyboards
- Bill Leverty – guitars
- Michael Foster – drums
- Perry Richardson – bass
