= Monsters of Rock Volume 2 =

Compilation album

Compilation album by Various artists
- Released: February 22, 2000
- Genre: Heavy metal Glam metal Hard rock Rock
- Length: 68:43
- Label: Razor & Tie

Monsters of Rock chronology
Monsters of Rock (1998)	Monsters of Rock Volume 2 (2000)	Monsters of Rock: Platinum Edition (2006)

Professional ratings
Review scores
Source	Rating
Allmusic	3/5 stars

Monsters of Rock Volume 2 is a 2000 compilation album that is a sequel to 1998's Monsters of Rock. It features 16 heavy metal, pop rock and arena rock hits from the 1980s and 1990s, many of which charted in the Top Ten or Top 40 of the Billboard Hot 100, with three going to Number One.

== Track listing ==
1. "Fly to the Angels" - Slaughter - 5:08
2. "When the Children Cry" - White Lion - 4:20
3. "The Warrior" - Scandal - 3:58
4. "Heat of the Moment" - Asia - 3:50
5. "Love of a Lifetime" - FireHouse - 4:49
6. "(Can't Live Without Your) Love and Affection" - Nelson - 3:56
7. "Give It to Me Good" - Trixter - 3:31
8. "Owner of a Lonely Heart" - Yes - 4:28
9. "Your Love" - The Outfield - 3:38
10. "Edge of a Broken Heart" - Vixen - 4:23
11. "Bang Bang" - Danger Danger - 3:58
12. "(I Just) Died in Your Arms" - Cutting Crew - 4:35
13. "Fly High Michelle" - Enuff Z'nuff - 4:17
14. "Stone Cold" - Rainbow - 5:18
15. "Fantasy" - Aldo Nova - 3:59
16. "Girlschool" - Britny Fox - 4:35
