= Nate Peck =

American singer

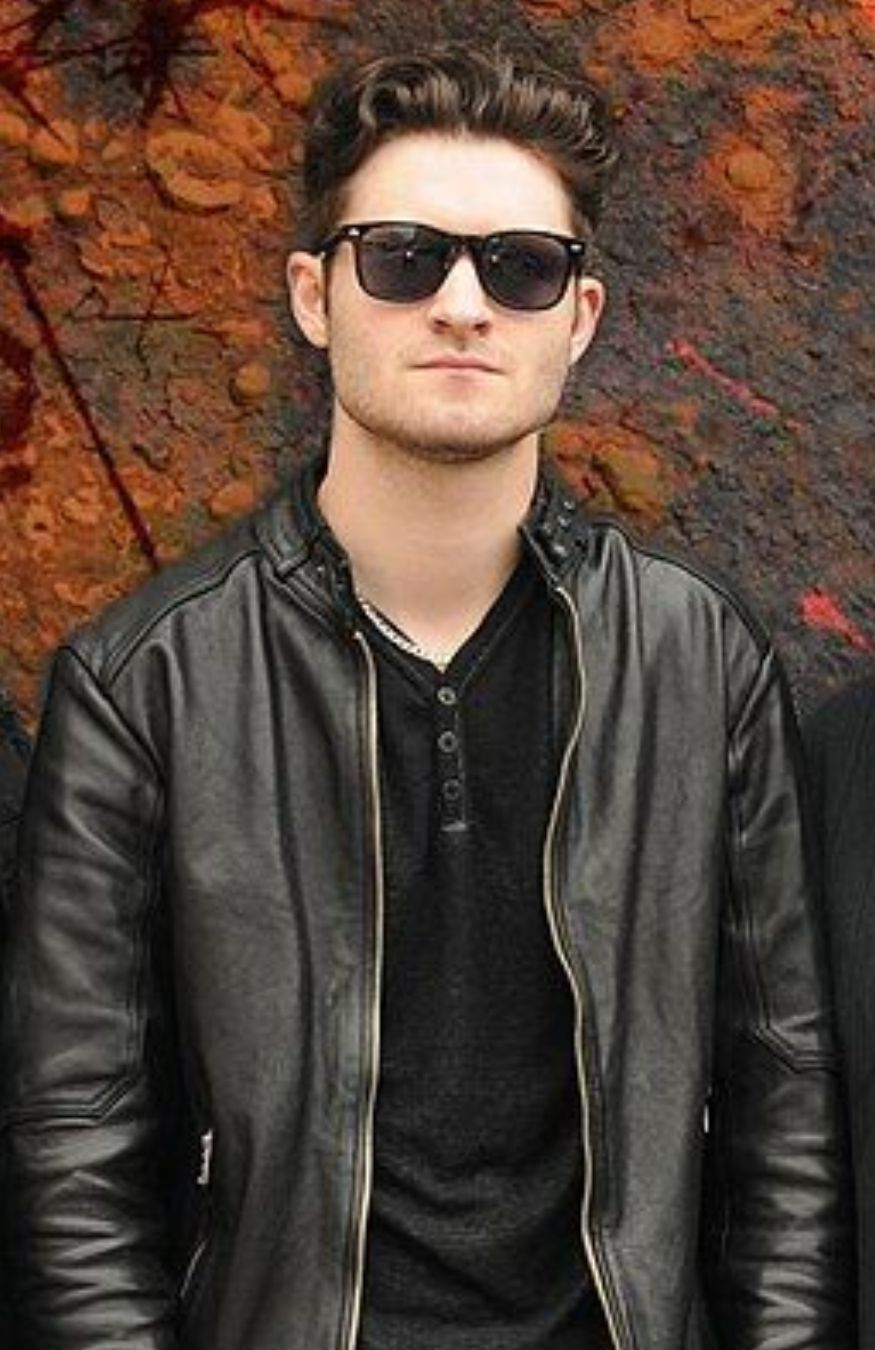
- Peck in 2024

Background information
- Born: Nathaniel Peck; Linden, Michigan, U.S.
- Genres: Hard rock; glam metal; alternative rock
- Occupation: Musician
- Instrument: Vocals
- Years active: 2022–present
- Member of: FireHouse
- Formerly of: WANTED

Nathaniel "Nate" Peck is an American rock singer and songwriter best known as the lead vocalist of the band FireHouse. He gained national attention as a golden ticket recipient on season 21 of American Idol in 2023 and later became FireHouse's official lead singer following the death of original frontman C. J. Snare in 2024. In 2025, the band released the single "Mighty Fine Lady", written by Peck and guitarist Bill Leverty.

== Early life ==
Nathaniel Peck was raised in Linden. He attended elementary school in Linden, transferred to Holly Academy through eighth grade, and later graduated from Lake Fenton High School in 2019. His father Jerry Peck, who died in 2007, and his grandfather Chuck Peck, were both involved in music, and Peck has cited them as formative influences. He developed an early affinity for classic rock, particularly music from the 1970s and 1980s, and has stated that he gravitated toward older musical styles from a young age.

== Career ==
Before gaining national attention, Peck was the lead singer of the Michigan rock band WANTED, performing regularly in the Oxford and Leonard areas. He also shared cover songs and original material on social media.

In March 2023, Peck auditioned for American Idol in Nashville, Tennessee, performing "Lightning Strikes Again" by Dokken. His audition aired on March 26, 2023, and resulted in a golden ticket to Hollywood from judges Lionel Richie, Katy Perry, and Luke Bryan. He later withdrew from the competition before the Hollywood rounds, citing personal reasons.

After appearing on season 21 of American Idol, Peck moved to Nashville for about eight months, during which he performed regularly and established connections within the rock music scene. During this period, he became acquainted with Jack Russell of Great White and appeared as a guest vocalist at several live performances with the band.

In late 2023, Peck was contacted by Great White guitarist Robbie Lochner and subsequently by FireHouse guitarist Bill Leverty, who was seeking a temporary replacement for vocalist C. J. Snare while he underwent cancer treatment. Peck learned approximately 14 FireHouse songs in under two weeks and made his live debut with the band without formal rehearsals.

After Snare's death on April 5, 2024, Peck continued performing with FireHouse and was later made the full-time lead vocalist with the approval of the band and Snare's family.

In 2025, the band released the single "Mighty Fine Lady", their first studio recording featuring Peck on lead vocals and their first release without Snare. The song was written by Peck and Leverty and released exclusively through the band's official website.

== Personal life ==
Peck returned to Michigan after his time in Nashville, Tennessee and resides in Holly. Outside of music, he has expressed an interest in local history and artifact collecting, particularly searching for antique medicine bottles in rivers near Fenton and Linden. He has cited artists such as Metallica, Boston, Styx, Foreigner, Mötley Crüe, and Dokken as major musical influences.

== Discography ==
=== with WANTED ===
- Chain Reaction (2022) – debut album with Peck on lead vocals

=== with FireHouse ===
- "Mighty Fine Lady" (2025) – written by Peck and Bill Leverty
