= Prime time (disambiguation) =

Prime time is the block of television programming during the middle of the evening.

Prime Time may also refer to:

== Literature ==
- Prime Time, a novel by Joan Collins
- Prime Time (novel), a Doctor Who Past Doctor Adventures novel

== Music ==
- Prime Time (band), a group formed by Ornette Coleman

=== Albums ===
- Prime Time (Count Basie album)
- Prime Time (Deion Sanders album)
- Prime Time (Don McLean album)
- Prime Time (FireHouse album)
- Prime Time, by Tony Orlando and Dawn

=== Songs ===
- "PrimeTime" (song), by Janelle Monáe
- "Prime Time" (Alan Parsons Project song), from Ammonia Avenue
- "Prime Time", by FireHouse from Prime Time
- "Prime Time", by Haircut 100 from Paint and Paint
- "Prime Time", by The Tubes from Remote Control
- "Primetime", by Jay-Z and Kanye West from Watch the Throne

== Sport ==
- Deion Sanders, American football player
- Elix Skipper, professional wrestler

== Film, television, and radio shows ==
- Prime Time (2008 film), a Spanish thriller film directed by Luis Calvo Ramos
- Prime Time (2021 film), a Polish drama thriller film directed by Jakub Piątek
- Primetime (film), a 2026 American crime thriller film directed by Lance Oppenheim
- Prime Time (Australian TV series), a 1986–1987 Australian soap opera/drama television series that aired on Nine Network
- Prime Time (Canadian TV program), a 1974–1975 Canadian current affairs television program that aired on CBC
- Prime Time (Irish TV programme), an Irish current affairs television programme that has aired on RTÉ One since 1992
- Primetime (American TV program), a 1989–2012 American news magazine television program that aired on ABC
- CBC Prime Time News, a Canadian television news programme
- Primetime (Cartoon Network), a 2001 Cartoon Network programming block
- UWN Primetime Live, a professional wrestling series
- Prime Time (radio program), a Canadian radio program

== Television and radio ==
- Primetime (TV channel), a defunct British pay-per-view boxing channel
- PrimeTime Radio, a British radio station
- Operation Prime Time (OPT), a consortium of independent television stations to develop prime time programming for independent stations
- Prime Time Entertainment Network (PTEN), a television network operated by the Prime Time Consortium, a joint venture between the Warner Bros. Domestic Television subsidiary of Time Warner and Chris-Craft Industries
- PRIMEtime, a defunct Malaysian television channel

== Other ==
- Prime Time, a beer produced by Asahi Breweries, Japan
