= Monsters of Rock: Platinum Edition =

Compilation album by Various artists
- Released: 2006 (Exclusive); July 24, 2007 (Retail)
- Genres: Heavy metal Glam metal Hard rock Progressive metal (Queensryche (band))
- Label: Razor & Tie

Monsters of Rock chronology
Monsters of Rock Volume 2 (2000)	Monsters of Rock: Platinum Edition (2006)

Professional ratings
Review scores
Source	Rating
Allmusic	3/5 stars

Monsters of Rock: Platinum Edition is a compilation album featuring many hard rock and heavy metal hits. It was released as a 2 disc set exclusively through telephone orders and its website and a single disc version sold in stores.

== Track listing ==
=== Disc one ===
1. "Nothin' but a Good Time" - Poison
2. "Cherry Pie" - Warrant
3. "Kiss Me Deadly" - Lita Ford
4. "Nobody's Fool" - Cinderella
5. "Once Bitten, Twice Shy" - Great White
6. "Rock You Like a Hurricane" - Scorpions
7. "Poison" - Alice Cooper
8. "I Hate Myself for Loving You" - Joan Jett & The Blackhearts
9. "Don't Treat Me Bad" - FireHouse
10. "Edge of a Broken Heart" - Vixen
11. "Cum On Feel the Noize" - Quiet Riot
12. "The Final Countdown" - Europe
13. "Bang Bang" - Danger Danger
14. "After the Rain" - Nelson
15. "Turn Up the Radio" - Autograph

=== Disc two ===
1. "18 and Life" - Skid Row
2. "Up All Night" - Slaughter
3. "Round and Round" - Ratt
4. "Wait" - White Lion
5. "Seventeen" - Winger
6. "We're Not Gonna Take It" - Twisted Sister
7. "Wait for You" - Bonham
8. "In My Dreams" - Dokken
9. "Just Like Paradise" - David Lee Roth
10. "Give It to Me Good" - Trixter
11. "Epic" - Faith No More
12. "Smooth Up in Ya" - Bulletboys
13. "Just Take My Heart" - Mr. Big
14. "Easy Come Easy Go" - Winger
15. "Empire" - Queensrÿche

=== Retail version ===
1. "18 and Life" - Skid Row - 3:50
2. "Nothin' But a Good Time" - Poison - 3:44
3. "Cherry Pie" - Warrant - 3:20
4. "Nobody's Fool" - Cinderella - 4:47
5. "Kiss Me Deadly" - Lita Ford - 3:58
6. "Round and Round" - Ratt - 4:23
7. "Up All Night" - Slaughter - 3:44
8. "Rock You Like a Hurricane" - Scorpions - 4:12
9. "Seventeen" - Winger - 4:04
10. "We're Not Gonna Take It" - Twisted Sister - 3:38
11. "Once Bitten, Twice Shy" - Great White - 3:59
12. "Wait" - White Lion - 4:01
13. "Cum on Feel the Noize" - Quiet Riot - 4:49
14. "Poison" - Alice Cooper - 4:28
15. "Don't Treat Me Bad" - FireHouse - 3:56
16. "Just Like Paradise" - David Lee Roth - 4:04
17. "I Hate Myself for Loving You" - Joan Jett & The Blackhearts - 4:07
18. "The Final Countdown" - Europe - 4:00

== See also ==
- Monsters of Rock
