= C.R. Alsip Guitars =

- Trade name: C.R. Alsip Guitars
- Native name: C.R. Alsip LLC
- Founded: February 2012; 14 years ago in Arkansas City, KS
- Headquarters: Calhoun, GA (Atlanta Area)
- Owner: Jake Willoughby
- Website: cralsipguitars.com

C.R. Alsip Guitars is a boutique American guitar manufacturer founded in February 2012 in Arkansas City, Kansas. Initially operating in Kansas from 2012 to 2014, the company has relocated to Calhoun, Georgia, within the Atlanta metropolitan area. As a solo-operated enterprise, C.R. Alsip LLC crafts high-end professional guitars from raw lumber to finished products. Named in honor of Connie Rae Alsip-Willoughby, the company is owned and operated by her son, Jake Willoughby, who had initially considered naming it Mason Alsip.

== History ==
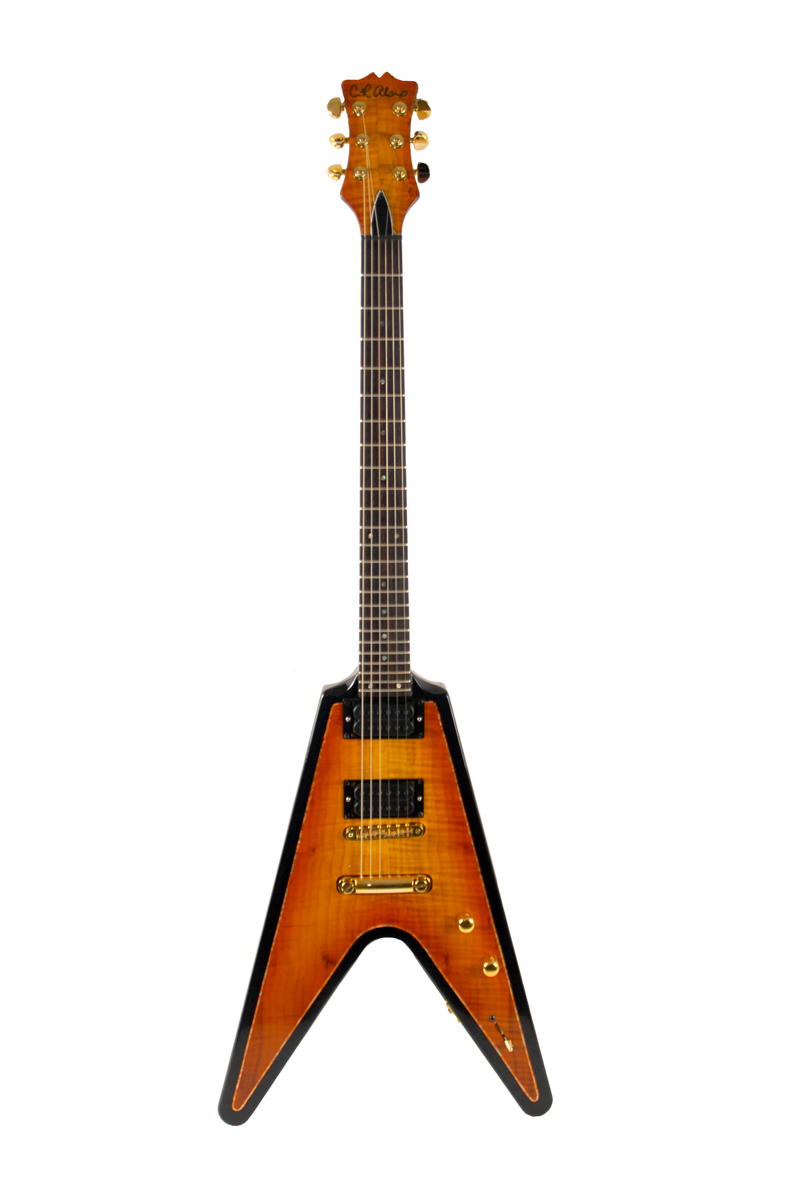
C.R. Alsip Vintage Flying V built for Frank Hannon of Tesla

Jake's grandpa (Max Ray Alsip) worked as a stonemason until his retirement. Before the company was off the ground Connie passed on & Jake decided to name the company after his late mother to honor her & help spread the word about cancer awareness. Jake & C.R. Alsip Guitars worked hand in hand with Phil Collen (Def Leppard) in 2012 to raise funds for the Gerson Institute.

The company has built instruments for, and worked with, acts such as Def Leppard, Tesla, Firehouse, Love & Theft & Saving Abel. Bill Leverty of Firehouse & Frank Hannon of Tesla were the first guitarists to endorse C.R. Alsip guitars and play them on the road when the company opened its doors in 2012.

Some of the current artists endorsing C.R. Alsip guitars includes Bill Leverty (Firehouse), Allen McKenzie (Firehouse), Frank Hannon (Tesla), Jeff Caughron (Jesta James, Full Devil Jacket), Scott Bartlett (Saving Abel) & many others.
