= Monster Madness =

Monster Madness may refer to:

- Cinemassacre's Monster Madness, a marathon of horror film reviews by James Rolfe since 2007
- Monster Madness (album), a 2000 compilation album of heavy metal hits
- Monster Madness: Battle for Suburbia, a 2007 Xbox 360 and PC video game
- Monster Madness: Grave Danger, a 2008 PlayStation 3 video game
- Monster Madness, a comic magazine by Stan Lee, published by Magazine Management
- Monster Madness, a horror anthology by Crypt TV
- "Monster Madness", several tracks on the Mourning Noise album Death Trip Delivery: 1981–1985
