= Bring 'Em Out =

Bring 'Em Out may refer to:

- "Bring Em Out" (song), a song by rapper T.I.
- Bring 'Em Out Live, an album by rock band FireHouse
- Bring 'Em Out, an EP and song by pop punk band Hawk Nelson
