= Monster Madness (album) =

Compilation album by Various artists
- Released: April 18, 2000
- Genre: Heavy metal Glam metal
- Length: 69:29
- Label: Razor & Tie

Professional ratings
Review scores
Source	Rating
Allmusic	link

Monster Madness is a compilation album of heavy metal hits released in 2000 as part of Razor & Tie's "Monster" line of 1980s hard rock/metal compilation CDs (Monsters of Rock, Monster Ballads, etc.). However, despite including a number of Top Ten or Top 40 singles on the Billboard Hot 100, this was less successful than its predecessors, and it didn't receive a certification from the RIAA.

== Track listing ==
1. "Dr. Feelgood" - Mötley Crüe - 4:51
2. "Unskinny Bop" - Poison - 3:48
3. "I Remember You" - Skid Row - 5:15
4. "Kiss Me Deadly" - Lita Ford - 4:01
5. "I Wanna Rock" - Twisted Sister - 3:04
6. "Silent Lucidity" - Queensrÿche - 5:49
7. "Epic" - Faith No More - 4:54
8. "Up All Night" - Slaughter - 3:47
9. "Don't Treat Me Bad" - FireHouse - 3:58
10. "Hole Hearted" - Extreme - 3:40
11. "Bang Your Head (Metal Health)" - Quiet Riot - 5:20
12. "In My Dreams" - Dokken - 4:21
13. "Wait" - White Lion - 4:03
14. "Easy Come, Easy Go" - Winger - 4:03
15. "I Saw Red" - Warrant - 3:50
16. "I'll See You in My Dreams" - Giant - 4:45
