= Bruce Waibel =

American bassist (1958–2003)

- Born: Bruce Kenneth Waibel; July 9, 1958; Livingston, New Jersey, U.S.
- Origin: Dover, New Jersey, U.S.
- Died: September 2, 2003 (aged 45) Florida, U.S.
- Genres: Rock, hard rock
- Occupation: Bassist
- Years active: 1982–2003
- Formerly of: FireHouse

Bruce Kenneth Waibel (July 9, 1958 – September 2, 2003) was an American bassist who played for several artists and bands. He was last remembered for playing bass guitar and touring with rock band FireHouse. He died in 2003 and his death was ruled a suicide.

== Biography ==
Bruce Waibel was born on July 9, 1958, in Livingston, New Jersey. When he was still a child, he moved to Florida. He started playing guitar when he was 9 years old.

In 1982, Waibel joined the Gregg Allman band as a roadie. Eventually he started playing guitar but switched to bass guitar during his last seven years with the band. He recorded three albums with them, earning two gold records.

Waibel also performed with Marshall Tucker, Captain Beyond, Stevie Ray Vaughan, Rick Derringer and others. He met guitarist Bill Leverty (guitarist of FireHouse) in 2000 and was invited to audition for the band that year. He played with them for three years, recording one album (O_{2}). He left the band in 2003 because he wanted to spend more time with his family. He also played bass on Leverty's first solo album, Wanderlust.

On September 2, 2003, Waibel was found dead at a friend's home in Florida. He had two children: Max (born in 1998) and Kimmerly.
