= Category 5 (album) =

Studio album by FireHouse
- Released: September 2, 1998 (Japan)
- Recorded: Leverty Sound Studios
- Genre: Hard rock
- Length: 54:45
- Labels: Pony Canyon (Japan); Lightyear (US)
- Producer: FireHouse

FireHouse chronology
Good Acoustics (1996)	Category 5 (1998)	Bring 'Em Out Live (1999)

Singles from Category 5
- 1. "Bringing Me Down" Released: 1998

Professional ratings
Review scores
Source	Rating
AllMusic	2.5/5 stars

Category 5 is the fifth album of the rock band FireHouse. It was originally released in 1998 in Japan and in 1999 in the United States by Lightyear Entertainment.

== Track listing ==
1. "Can't Stop the Pain" (Foster, Leverty, Richardson) – 5:37
2. "Acid Rain" (Effler, Richardson, Rogers) – 3:27
3. "Bringing Me Down" (Leverty, Snare) – 4:39
4. "Dream" (Richardson, Rogers) – 4:13
5. "Get Ready" (Foster, Leverty, Richardson, Snare) – 4:18
6. "If It Changes" (Leverty, Snare) – 4:56
7. "The Day, the Week, and the Weather" (Effler, Richardson, Rogers) – 5:27
8. "The Nights Were Young" (Leverty, Snare) – 4:18
9. "Have Mercy" (Foster, Leverty, Richardson, Snare) – 4:36
10. "I'd Do Anything" (Leverty, Snare) – 5:45
11. "Arrow Through My Heart" (Effler, Richardson, Rogers) – 4:11
12. "Life Goes On" (Leverty, Snare) – 10:24
13. "Get to Know You" hidden track (Richardson, Foster, Leverty)

== Personnel ==
- C.J. Snare – vocals, keyboards
- Bill Leverty – guitars
- Michael Foster – drums
- Perry Richardson – bass guitar

== Charts ==
Chart (1998)	Peak position
Japanese Albums (Oricon)	22
