= O2 (FireHouse album) =

O_{2}

Studio album by FireHouse
- Released: November 7, 2000
- Genre: Hard rock; glam metal; alternative metal; pop rock
- Label: Pony Canyon; Spitfire

FireHouse chronology
Bring 'Em Out Live (1999)	O_{2} (2000)	Prime Time (2003)

Professional ratings
Review scores
Source	Rating
AllMusic	2/5 stars

O_{2} is the sixth studio album of the rock band FireHouse. It was released in 2000 and it is the only album to feature the late Bruce Waibel on bass, this album saw FireHouse back to its harder form of glam-infused hard rock sounds that make them popular in early 90s while also modernizing their sound in the same time.

== Track listing ==
All songs written by Leverty and Snare.

1. "Jumpin'" – 3:44
2. "Take It Off" – 3:51
3. "The Dark" – 4:36
4. "Don't Fade on Me" – 4:47
5. "I'd Rather Be Making Love" – 3:59
6. "What You Can Do" – 3:36
7. "I'm In Love This Time" – 3:45
8. "Unbelievable" – 4:13
9. "Loving You Is Paradise" – 4:29
10. "Call of the Night" – 4:21

== Personnel ==
- C.J. Snare – vocals, keyboards
- Bill Leverty – guitars, vocals on track 7
- Michael Foster – drums
- Bruce Waibel – bass guitar

== Charts ==
Chart (2000)	Peak position
Japanese Albums (Oricon)	50
