= Perry Richardson =

American bassist

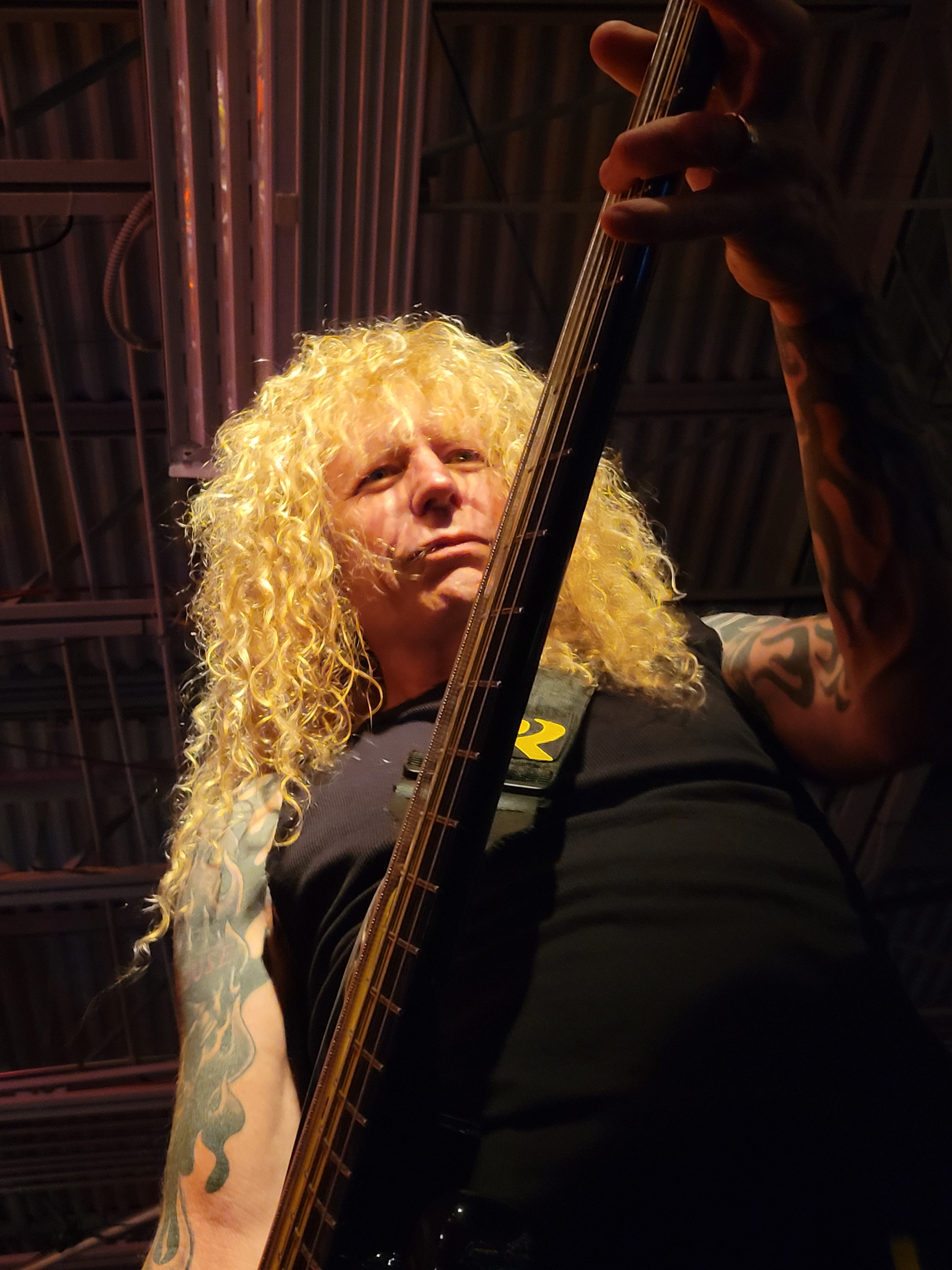
- Richardson with Stryper in 2022

Background information
- Born: July 7, 1958 (age 68)
- Origin: Conway, South Carolina, U.S.
- Genres: Hard rock, glam metal, heavy metal, Christian metal
- Occupation: Bassist
- Years active: 1980–present
- Member of: Stryper
- Formerly of: FireHouse

Perry Richardson (born July 7, 1958) is an American bass guitarist who played in the hard rock band FireHouse until 2000 and is currently the bassist of Stryper.

== Biography ==
Richardson graduated Conway High School in Conway, South Carolina and went on to graduate from the University of South Carolina/Coastal Carolina in 1980 with Bachelor of Science degree in Business Management.

Richardson joined C. J. Snare’s band Prophet in North Carolina, and suggested renaming it Maxx Warrior, after Mad Max 2: The Road Warrior. Maxx Warrior toured for approximately five years, released an EP, and opened for Stryper in Charlotte in 1985. After the group disbanded, Richardson joined the Southern rock band Nantucket.

Eventually Richardson and Snare met with Bill Leverty and Michael Foster (who were playing with a band called White Heat). The four got together in Charlotte and started FireHouse in 1989. While Richardson was with the band, they sold over 7 million albums worldwide and won an American Music Award in 1992 for Favorite New Heavy Metal/Hard Rock Artist. Richardson was inducted into the South Carolina Entertainment & Music Hall of Fame in 1995.

After leaving FireHouse in 2000, Richardson played bass for country music performers Craig Morgan and Trace Adkins.

On October 30, 2017, Christian metal band Stryper announced that Richardson would be their new bass player to replace Tim Gaines. Richardson made his live debut with Stryper at the Frontiers Rock Festival on April 20, 2018. Even the Devil Believes (2020) was the first Stryper album to feature Richardson on bass. He later played on The Final Battle (2022), To Hell with the Amps (2024), When We Were Kings (2024), The Greatest Gift of All (2025), and Throne of Thorns (2026).

== Discography ==
=== with Maxx Warrior ===
- Maxx Warrior (1985)

=== with FireHouse ===
- FireHouse (1990)
- Hold Your Fire (1992)
- 3 (1995)
- Good Acoustics (1996)
- Category 5 (1998)
- Best of Firehouse (1998)
- Super Hits (2000)
- Bring 'Em Out Live (1999)

=== with Stryper ===
- Even the Devil Believes (2020)
- The Final Battle (2022)
- To Hell with the Amps (2024) (acoustic album)
- When We Were Kings (2024)
- The Greatest Gift of All (2025) (christmas album)
- Throne of Thorns (2026)
