= Monsters of Rock (album) =

Compilation album by Various artists
- Released: June 2, 1998
- Recorded: Various times from 1981-1990
- Genres: Heavy metal Glam metal Hard rock
- Label: Razor & Tie

Monsters of Rock chronology
Monsters of Rock (1998)	Monsters of Rock Volume 2 (2000)

Professional ratings
Review scores
Source	Rating
AllMusic	4/5 stars

Monsters of Rock is a heavy metal/hard rock compilation album released by Razor & Tie, which includes 16 hits of the 1980s "hair metal" scene (except for .38 Special's 1981 hit "Hold on Loosely"), many of which charted in either the Top 10 or Top 40 of the Billboard Hot 100. A 2 disc version was also released, heavily promoted by TV commercials and containing 35 songs (except for Cheap Trick's "Surrender", which was released in 1978).

The single-disc version was eventually certified platinum by the RIAA in 2001.

== Track listing (single-disc version) ==
1. "Cum on Feel the Noize" - Quiet Riot - 4:51
2. "Once Bitten Twice Shy" - Great White - 5:22
3. "Poison" - Alice Cooper - 4:30
4. "The Final Countdown" - Europe - 5:11
5. "Round and Round" - Ratt - 4:24
6. "Cherry Pie" - Warrant - 3:20
7. "Here I Go Again" - Whitesnake - 4:35
8. "Every Rose Has Its Thorn" - Poison - 4:20
9. "Seventeen" - Winger - 4:05
10. "Cult of Personality" - Living Colour - 4:54
11. "We're Not Gonna Take It" - Twisted Sister - 3:39
12. "You've Got Another Thing Comin'" - Judas Priest - 5:08
13. "Nobody's Fool" - Cinderella - 4:48
14. "Hold on Loosely" - .38 Special - 4:37
15. "Turn Up the Radio" - Autograph - 4:34
16. "Sister Christian" - Night Ranger - 4:56

== See also ==
- Monster Ballads
- Monster Madness
- Monsters of Rock: Platinum Edition
