= Prime Time (FireHouse album) =

Studio album by FireHouse
- Released: August 12, 2003
- Genre: Glam metal; hard rock
- Label: Pony Canyon

FireHouse chronology
O_{2} (2000)	Prime Time (2003)	Full Circle (2011)

Professional ratings
Review scores
Source	Rating
AllMusic	2/5 stars

Prime Time is the seventh studio album of the rock band FireHouse. It was released in 2003 by Pony Canyon in Japan, and in 2004 in the United States.

It is the only album to feature Dario Seixas on bass guitar, who left after the album was finished. Allen McKenzie since took his place. It is Firehouse's final studio album of all original material with singer C.J. Snare before his death in April 2024.

== Track listing ==
All songs written by Leverty and Snare except where noted.

1. "Prime Time" (Foster, Leverty, Snare) – 4:34
2. "Crash" (Foster, Leverty, Snare) – 4:33
3. "Door to Door" (Foster, Leverty) – 5:27
4. "Perfect Lie" – 4:30
5. "Holding On" (Leverty) – 4:06
6. "Body Language" – 3:53
7. "I'm the One" (Leverty) – 5:24
8. "Take Me Away" – 3:55
9. "Home Tonight" (Foster, Leverty, Snare) – 3:31
10. "Let Go" (Snare) – 4:39

== Personnel ==
- C.J. Snare – vocals, keyboards
- Bill Leverty – guitars, vocals on track 5 and 7
- Michael Foster – drums, vocals on track 3
- Dario Seixas – bass guitar
