= FireHouse (album) =

Studio album by FireHouse
- Released: September 11, 1990: March 1, 2024 (remaster)
- Recorded: April–July 1990
- Genres: Glam metal; hard rock
- Length: 48:34
- Label: Epic
- Producer: David Prater

FireHouse chronology
| FireHouse (1990) | Hold Your Fire (1992) |

Singles from Firehouse
- 1. "Shake & Tumble" Released: January 1990; 2. "Don't Treat Me Bad" Released: March 1991; 3. "Love of a Lifetime" Released: June 5, 1991; 4. "All She Wrote" Released: 1991

Professional ratings
Review scores
| Source | Rating |
|---|---|
| AllMusic | 3/5 stars |
| Ultimate Classic Rock | no rating |

FireHouse is the debut album by American glam metal band FireHouse, released on September 11, 1990, through Epic. It launched the group into stardom. The record was certified double platinum in the United States and gold in Canada, Japan and Singapore.

== Background ==
FireHouse spawned four singles, "Shake & Tumble", "Don't Treat Me Bad", "All She Wrote", and the band's signature power ballad, "Love of a Lifetime".

The song "Don't Walk Away" was used in a scene of the 2008 movie The Wrestler, directed by Darren Aronofsky.

The song "Overnight Sensation" was a part of the soundtrack in the video game Brütal Legend.

The song "Don't Treat Me Bad" was featured in episode two of the HBO Max series Peacemaker, as the title character takes out the vinyl record and listens to that song.

== Track listing ==
All tracks are written by Bill Leverty and C.J. Snare, except where noted.

| No. | Title | Writer(s) | Length |
|---|---|---|---|
| 1. | "Rock on the Radio" | Cosby Ellis; Michael Foster; Leverty; Snare | 4:45 |
| 2. | "All She Wrote" | | 4:27 |
| 3. | "Shake & Tumble" | Foster; Leverty; Richardson; Snare | 3:30 |
| 4. | "Don't Treat Me Bad" | Ellis; Foster; Leverty; Snare | 3:55 |
| 5. | "Oughta Be a Law" | Ellis; Leverty; Snare | 3:54 |
| 6. | "Lover's Lane" | Ellis; Foster; Leverty; Snare | 4:02 |

| No. | Title | Writer(s) | Length |
|---|---|---|---|
| 1. | "Home Is Where the Heart Is" | | 4:48 |
| 2. | "Don't Walk Away" | | 4:31 |
| 3. | "Seasons of Change" (Instrumental) | | 1:29 |
| 4. | "Overnight Sensation" | Ellis; Foster; Leverty; Snare | 3:56 |
| 5. | "Love of a Lifetime" | | 4:46 |
| 6. | "Helpless" | | 4:25 |
| Total length: | | | 48:34 |

== Personnel ==
FireHouse is

- C.J. Snare – lead vocals, keyboards
- Bill Leverty – guitars, backing vocals
- Perry Richardson – bass, backing vocals
- Michael Foster – drums, percussion, backing vocals

Production

- Executive producer: Michael Caplan
- Produced by David Prater
- Engineered by Doug Oberkircher
- Assistant engineer: Ellen Fitton
- Mixed by David Prater and Doug Oberkircher
- Model – Briggette McClellan

== Charts ==
| Chart (1991) | Peak position |
|---|---|
| Australian Albums (ARIA) | 137 |
| Canada Top Albums/CDs (RPM) | 67 |
| US Billboard 200 | 21 |

== Certifications ==
| Region | Certification | Certified units/sales |
|---|---|---|
| Canada (Music Canada) | Gold | 50,000^{^} |
| United States (RIAA) | 2× Platinum | 2,000,000^{^} |
^{^} Shipments figures based on certification alone.
