= 3 (FireHouse album) =

Studio album by FireHouse
- Released: April 11, 1995
- Recorded: 1994–1995
- Genres: Hard rock; arena rock; pop rock
- Length: 43:35
- Labels: Epic; Sony
- Producer: Ron Nevison

FireHouse chronology
Hold Your Fire (1992)	3 (1995)	Good Acoustics (1996)

Singles from 3
- 1. "I Live My Life for You" Released: 1995; 2. "Love Is A Dangerous Thing" Released: 1995; 3. "Here for You" Released: 1995

Professional ratings
Review scores
Source	Rating
AllMusic	3/5 stars

3 is the third studio album by American hard rock band FireHouse. It was released in 1995 on Epic Records. It featured a softer sound than their previous two albums, although unlike many glam metal bands at that time, Firehouse did not change its sound despite the domination of grunge rock and alternative rock in the mainstream music industry by the time of the album's release.

Despite the album not selling as well as previous releases, it spawned the hit power ballad in "I Live My Life for You", reaching No. 26 on the Billboard Top 100. The album hit No. 66 on the Billboard Top 200 and was certified gold in other countries.

The band toured extensively in Asia, Argentina, Brazil and in smaller venues in the United States to support the album.

== Track listing ==
All songs written by Bill Leverty and C.J. Snare.

1. "Love Is a Dangerous Thing" – 4:46
2. "What's Wrong" – 4:32
3. "Somethin' 'Bout Your Body" – 4:43
4. "Trying to Make a Living" – 4:26
5. "Here for You" – 3:54
6. "Get a Life" – 4:21
7. "Two Sides" – 4:25
8. "No One at All" – 3:36
9. "Temptation" – 4:28
10. "I Live My Life for You" – 4:24

== Singles ==
Year	Title	Peak chart positions	Album
Year	Title	US	Album
1995	I Live My Life For You	26	3
1995	Love Is A Dangerous Thing	—	3
1995	Here For You	108	3

== Personnel ==
- C.J. Snare – vocals, keyboards, additional bass, percussion
- Bill Leverty – guitars
- Perry Richardson – bass
- Michael Foster – drums

=== Production ===
- Produced and engineered by Ron Nevison
- Assistant engineers: Shawn Berman, Steve Gallagher (also served as mix assistant)
- Mixing: Chris Lord-Alge
- Mastering: Doug Sax

== Charts ==
Chart (1995)	Peak position
Japanese Albums (Oricon)	22
US Billboard 200	66
