= I Live My Life for You =

Single by FireHouse

from the album 3
- Released: 1995
- Recorded: 1994
- Genre: Acoustic rock, glam metal
- Length: 4:24
- Label: Epic
- Songwriters: C.J. Snare, Bill Leverty
- Producer: Ron Nevison

FireHouse singles chronology
"Sleeping with You" (1992)	"I Live My Life for You" (1995)	"Here for You" (1995)

"I Live My Life for You" is the seventh single released by the American rock band FireHouse. It is the tenth and last track from its third album, 3 (1995). A power ballad, the song reached numbers 17 and 26 on the US Cash Box Top 100 and Billboard Hot 100 charts, and number 20 on the Adult Contemporary chart. It is generally considered to be the last song released by a 1980s style glam metal band still classified as such to make a significant impact on the charts, something notable because it was released in 1995 which was a full three years after the genre was pushed out of the mainstream by the grunge movement. The song was written by guitarist Bill Leverty and vocalist C.J. Snare.

When asked about the song's success in an interview, Snare commented that "we surprised a lot of people because we were the only band of that genre that I can remember that actually had a top 20 hit right in the middle of that whole Seattle scene".

== Charts ==
=== Weekly charts ===
Chart (1995)	Peak position
El Salvador (UPI)	2
US Billboard Hot 100	26
US Adult Contemporary (Billboard)	20
US Pop Airplay (Billboard)	14
US Cash Box Top 100	17

=== Year-end charts ===
Chart (1995)	Position
US Billboard Hot 100	91
