= Prime Time (Canadian TV program) =

- Genre: Current affairs
- Directed by: J. Edward Shaw
- Presented by: Don McNeill
- Country of origin: Canada
- Original language: English
- No. of seasons: 1

Production
- Executive producer: Sam Levene
- Producers: Martyn Burke; Ralph Thomas; Larry Zolf
- Running time: 60 minutes

Original release
- Network: CBC Television
- Release: 12 November 1974 – 4 March 1975

Prime Time is a Canadian current affairs television program that aired on CBC Television from 1974 to 1975.

== Premise ==
Film segments and interviews formed the content of Prime Time. Subjects included Israel's Moshe Dayan, magician Doug Henning and Uganda's Idi Amin. "Backlot Canada", a documentary by Peter Rowe, concerned the portrayal of Canada in American feature films. The program also included a satirical examination of Britain by Martyn Burke.

== Scheduling ==
This hour-long program was broadcast once per month on a Tuesday at 10:00 p.m. from 12 November 1974 to 4 March 1975.
