= Reach for the Sky (FireHouse song) =

Single by FireHouse

from the album Hold Your Fire
- Released: 1992
- Recorded: 1991
- Genre: Glam metal
- Label: Epic
- Songwriters: Bill Leverty; C.J. Snare

FireHouse singles chronology
"All She Wrote" (1991)	"Reach for the Sky" (1992)	"When I Look into Your Eyes" (1992)

"Reach for the Sky" is a song by the American rock band FireHouse, released in 1992 by Epic Records as the first single from their second album, Hold Your Fire (1992). The song was written by guitarist Bill Leverty and vocalist C.J. Snare. It peaked at numbers 59 and 83 on the US Cash Box Top 100 and Billboard Hot 100 charts.

== Charts ==
Chart (1992)	Peak position
Australia (ARIA)	192
US Billboard Hot 100	83
US Album Rock Tracks (Billboard)	27
US Cash Box Top 100	59
