= All She Wrote (FireHouse song) =

Single by FireHouse

from the album FireHouse
- Released: 1991
- Genre: Glam metal; heavy metal
- Label: Epic
- Songwriters: Bill Leverty; C.J. Snare

FireHouse singles chronology
| "Love of a Lifetime" (1991) | "All She Wrote" (1991) | "Reach for the Sky" (1992) |

"All She Wrote" is a song by the American rock band FireHouse, released as the fourth and final single from their debut album, FireHouse (1990). The single peaked at No. 37 and 58 on the US Cash Box Top 100 and Billboard Hot 100 charts. The song was written by the guitarist Bill Leverty and the vocalist C.J. Snare. The promotional video for the song was filmed at the O.C. Tanner Amphitheater in Springdale, Utah.

== Charts ==
| Chart (1992) | Peak position |
|---|---|
| Australia (ARIA) | 169 |
| US Billboard Hot 100 | 58 |
| US Album Rock Tracks (Billboard) | 25 |
| US Cash Box Top 100 | 37 |
