= Hold Your Fire (FireHouse album) =

Studio album by FireHouse
- Released: June 16, 1992
- Recorded: 1991–1992
- Genres: Glam metal; hard rock
- Length: 51:34
- Label: Epic
- Producer: David Prater

FireHouse chronology
FireHouse (1990)	Hold Your Fire (1992)	3 (1995)

Singles from Hold Your Fire
- 1. "Reach for the Sky" Released: 1992; 2. "When I Look into Your Eyes" Released: 1992; 3. "Sleeping with You" Released: 1992

Professional ratings
Review scores
Source	Rating
AllMusic	3/5 stars
Chicago Tribune	2/4 stars
Christgau's Consumer Guide	C−
Entertainment Weekly	D

Hold Your Fire is the second studio album by the hard rock band FireHouse. It was released in June 1992. The album spent thirty weeks in the Billboard 200 Top Albums chart peaking at No. 23.

The album spawned the singles "Reach for the Sky", "Sleeping with You" and "When I Look into Your Eyes". The album was certified gold by the RIAA in the United States for sales of over 500,000 units.

The album is also known for having the same snare sound as the one used on Dream Theater's album Images and Words, another album produced by David Prater around the same time.

== Track listing ==
All songs written by Bill Leverty and C.J. Snare, except where noted.

1. "Reach for the Sky" – 4:47
2. "Rock You Tonight" – 4:35
3. "Sleeping with You" – 3:51
4. "You're Too Bad" – 3:38
5. "When I Look into Your Eyes" – 4:00
6. "Get in Touch" – 5:24
7. "Hold Your Fire" – 3:51
8. "The Meaning of Love" – 4:12
9. "Talk of the Town" – 4:38
10. "Life in the Real World" – 3:36
11. "Mama Didn't Raise No Fool" (Foster, Leverty, Richardson, Snare) – 4:00
12. "Hold the Dream" – 5:02

== Personnel ==
- C.J. Snare – lead vocals, keyboards
- Bill Leverty – guitars
- Perry Richardson – bass guitar
- Michael Foster – drums, percussion

Production

- David Prater – producer
- Michael Caplan – executive producer
- Doug Oberkircher – engineer
- Steve Regina – assistant engineer
- David Prater – mixing
- Doug Oberkircher – mixing
- Vladimir Meller – mastering

== Charts ==
Chart (1992)	Peak position
Australian Albums (ARIA)	180
German Albums (Offizielle Top 100)	66
Japanese Albums (Oricon)	14
US Billboard 200	23

== Certifications ==
Region	Certification	Certified units/sales
United States (RIAA)	Gold	500,000^{^}
^{^} Shipments figures based on certification alone.
