= When I Look into Your Eyes =

Single by FireHouse

from the album Hold Your Fire
- Released: 1992
- Recorded: 1992
- Genre: Glam metal
- Length: 4:00
- Label: Epic
- Songwriters: Bill Leverty; C.J. Snare
- Producer: David Frater

FireHouse singles chronology
| "Reach for the Sky" (1991) | "When I Look into Your Eyes" (1992) | "Sleeping with You" (1992) |

Music video
- "When I Look into Your Eyes" on YouTube

"When I Look into Your Eyes" is the sixth single released by American rock band FireHouse. The song, a power ballad, became the band's second hit ballad, reaching No. 8 on the US Billboard Hot 100 for the week ending October 17, 1992. It also peaked at No. 7 on the US Cash Box Top 100 and No. 65 on the UK Singles Chart for the week ending December 19, 1992. The song was written by guitarist Bill Leverty and vocalist C.J. Snare.

== Critical reception ==
Larry Flick, Billboard magazine's reviewer, left warm review on this track. He thought that despite "a bit purple in the prose department... this cut might tug the heartstrings of top 40 listeners".

== Charts ==
| Chart (1992–1993) | Peak position |
|---|---|
| Australia (ARIA) | 140 |
| Canada Top Singles (RPM) | 20 |
| UK Singles (OCC) | 65 |
| US Billboard Hot 100 | 8 |
| US Cash Box Top 100 | 7 |

=== Year-end chart ===
| Chart (1992) | Position |
|---|---|
| US Billboard Hot 100 | 82 |
