= Allen McKenzie =

American bassist

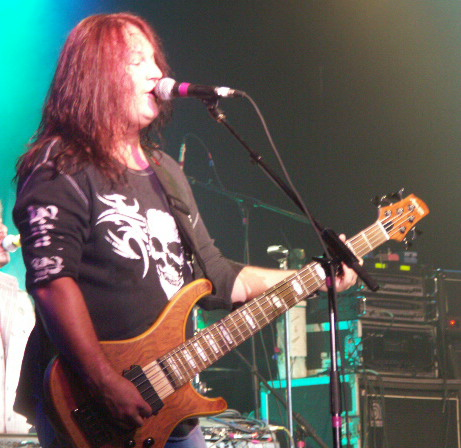

Background information
- Also known as: "A-Mac"
- Born: January 1, 1960 (age 66)
- Origin: Jackson, Ohio, U.S.
- Genres: Hard rock, glam metal, progressive rock, melodic rock
- Occupation: Bassist
- Years active: 1985–present
- Member of: FireHouse
- Website: firehousemusic.com

Allen McKenzie (born January 1, 1960) is an American musician, best known as the bass guitarist for the hard rock/glam metal band FireHouse.

== Personal life ==
McKenzie grew up in a rural area of Jackson, Ohio, before moving to Akron with his family in 1977. In June 1978, McKenzie graduated from Garfield High School. In September, he enlisted in the United States Army and served for three years in Landau, West Germany, then three years stateside.

On October 8, 2005, he married his wife Tina. They have three children.

McKenzie started playing a C.R. Alsip bass customized to McKenzie's liking in July 2014. McKenzie met master luthier Jake Willoughby of C.R. Alsip Guitars through bandmate Bill Leverty in 2012. After McKenzie heard Leverty's guitar he asked Willoughby if he would be interested in building a bass guitar. Willoughby agreed, building the iconic "Guinness Harp" 5 string bass that made its first appearance onstage with McKenzie in 2014.

== Career ==
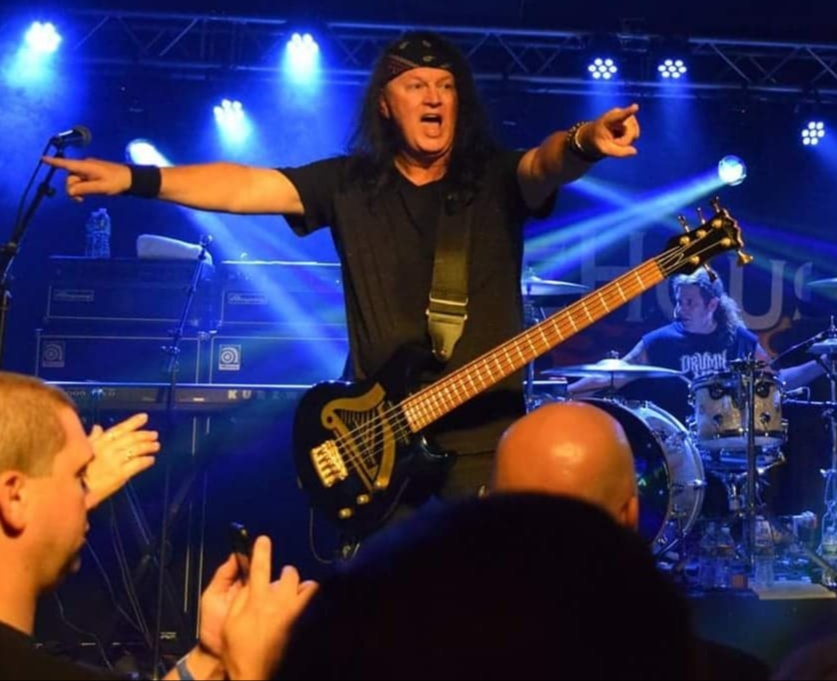
McKenzie with FireHouse in 2018

=== Foxx ===
On leaving the army, McKenzie became involved in the music scene in Akron and played with cover bands. McKenzie then, by chance, met Dave Jackson in the rubber refinery where they both worked. Together, they founded a local hard rock band called Foxx in late 1985. Foxx released two albums – Foxx (1989) and Stick It Out (1991) – and toured. Foxx disbanded in 1992, but reunited in December 2012 and still perform on occasion.

=== Quest ===
In 1993, McKenzie joined Quest, a progressive rock band based in Cleveland, Ohio. Membership of Quest allowed him to explore his interest as a singer, keyboard player and songwriter. At the end of 1994, Quest released a CD, Opposite sides of the picket fence. In summer, 1994, Quest gave an opening performance for a Yes concert at the Blossom Music Center in Cuyahoga Falls, Ohio. Quest's prog rock CD failed and in 1995, the group disbanded.

=== Peacetree ===
McKenzie joined Peacetree, a hard rock band, as a bass guitarist. The band was fronted by Elijah Black. Peacetree released three CDs, Insense (1996), Wonderful Day (1998) and Nice to meet you (2000). Nice to meet you earned Peacetree a nomination for "Best hard rock band" at the 2000 Cleveland Free Times Music Awards. Peacetree gave opening performances for bands who were touring nationally such as Mötley Crüe, Styx, Cinderella and Neil Young. Peacetree also appeared on The Jenny Jones Show.

=== Warrant singer Jani Lane ===
Peacetree disbanded in 2002. McKenzie played with the JAK band, a local classic rock band. He also rehearsed with a new band led by Elijah Black. Then, Jani Lane, the original vocalist for the band Warrant, approached McKenzie to join him on a solo tour to promote Lane's CD, Back Down to One. McKenzie worked with Lane from October 2002 to March 2003.

=== FireHouse ===
On October 23, 2003, McKenzie joined FireHouse at the recommendation of Billy Morris, the guitarist for Lane, and Tony Avitar, FireHouse's current sound engineer. FireHouse toured the USA, Canada, Mexico, Puerto Rico, Japan, India, Brazil, Spain, Italy, Greece and the UK. Allen, along with the rest of the band, contributed to the CDs Monster Ballads Christmas (Rockin' Around The Christmas Tree, released in 2007), Hell Bent Forever-A Tribute To Judas Priest ("You've Got Another Thing Coming", released in 2008), the DVD, Metal Mania Stripped Across America ("Don't Treat Me Bad", released in 2005), and the band's latest full-length CD, Full Circle, a re-recorded "best of" album, released in 2011.
