= Don't Treat Me Bad =

Single by FireHouse

from the album FireHouse
- Released: 1991
- Recorded: 1990
- Genre: Glam metal; hard rock
- Length: 3:54
- Label: Epic
- Songwriters: Cosby Ellis; Michael Foster; Bill Leverty; C. J. Snare

FireHouse singles chronology
"Shake & Tumble" (1990)	"Don't Treat Me Bad" (1991)	"Love of a Lifetime" (1991)

"Don't Treat Me Bad" is the second single by the American hard rock band FireHouse from its self-titled album (1990). It was first recorded in 1990 and commercially released the following year. The song reached No. 19 on the US Billboard Hot 100, becoming the band's first charting single and its first top-40 hit on the chart. It also peaked at number 20 on the US Cash Box Top 100.

== Charts ==
Chart (1991–92)	Peak position
Australia (ARIA)	8
Canada Top Singles (RPM)	35
UK Singles (OCC)	71
US Billboard Hot 100	19
US Hot Mainstream Rock Tracks (Billboard)	16
US Cash Box Top 100	20
