= Love of a Lifetime (FireHouse song) =

- Cover of Japanese CD release

Single by FireHouse

from the album FireHouse
- B-side: "Helpless"; "All She Wrote"
- Released: 1991
- Recorded: 1990
- Genre: Glam metal
- Length: 4:46
- Label: Epic; Sony
- Songwriters: Bill Leverty; C.J. Snare
- Producers: David Prater; Bruce Dickinsom

FireHouse singles chronology
"Don't Treat Me Bad" (1991)	"Love of a Lifetime" (1991)	"All She Wrote" (1991)

"Love of a Lifetime" is a song performed by the American rock band FireHouse. It was the band's third single and its highest-charting single in the United States, entering the Billboard Hot 100 June 29, 1991, at No. 81 and peaking at No. 5 the week of September 28, 1991. It is also the band's first and most popular power ballad. The song was written by vocalist C. J. Snare and guitarist Bill Leverty.

The song is arguably what FireHouse is most known for, and has been used as a first dance song at countless weddings since its release. In a 2005 interview, Snare commented "now I have the benefit of time to look back over this and there isn't a show that goes by where people don't come up to us and are like "'Love of a Lifetime' – we got married to that song!".

== Origin ==
The song was written by C. J. Snare; he wrote it while playing solo gigs at a Holiday Inn. When the band brought the demos for their first album to Epic Records, the label felt that the album needed a stronger ballad. Snare said "I remember raising my hand sheepishly and saying 'Well, I have a song...,' so we played it for them and they absolutely loved it and it did become a big hit".

== Cover versions ==
The project Collage recorded the song in 1998 and released it as a single. It peaked at No. 4 on the Bubbling Under Hot 100 Singles chart and was the last single released by the project.

Country singer Katie Armiger recorded a cover version on her eponymous first album in 2007.

== Charts ==
=== Weekly charts ===
Chart (1991)	Peak position
Australia (ARIA)	15
Canada Top Singles (RPM)	30
US Billboard Hot 100	5
US Billboard Adult Contemporary	37
US Cash Box Top 100	7

=== Year-end charts ===
Chart (1991)	Peak position
US Billboard Hot 100	43
US Cash Box Top 100	43

== Certifications ==
Region	Certification	Certified units/sales
United States (RIAA)	Gold	500,000^{^}
^{^} Shipments figures based on certification alone.
