= FireHouse =

American rock band

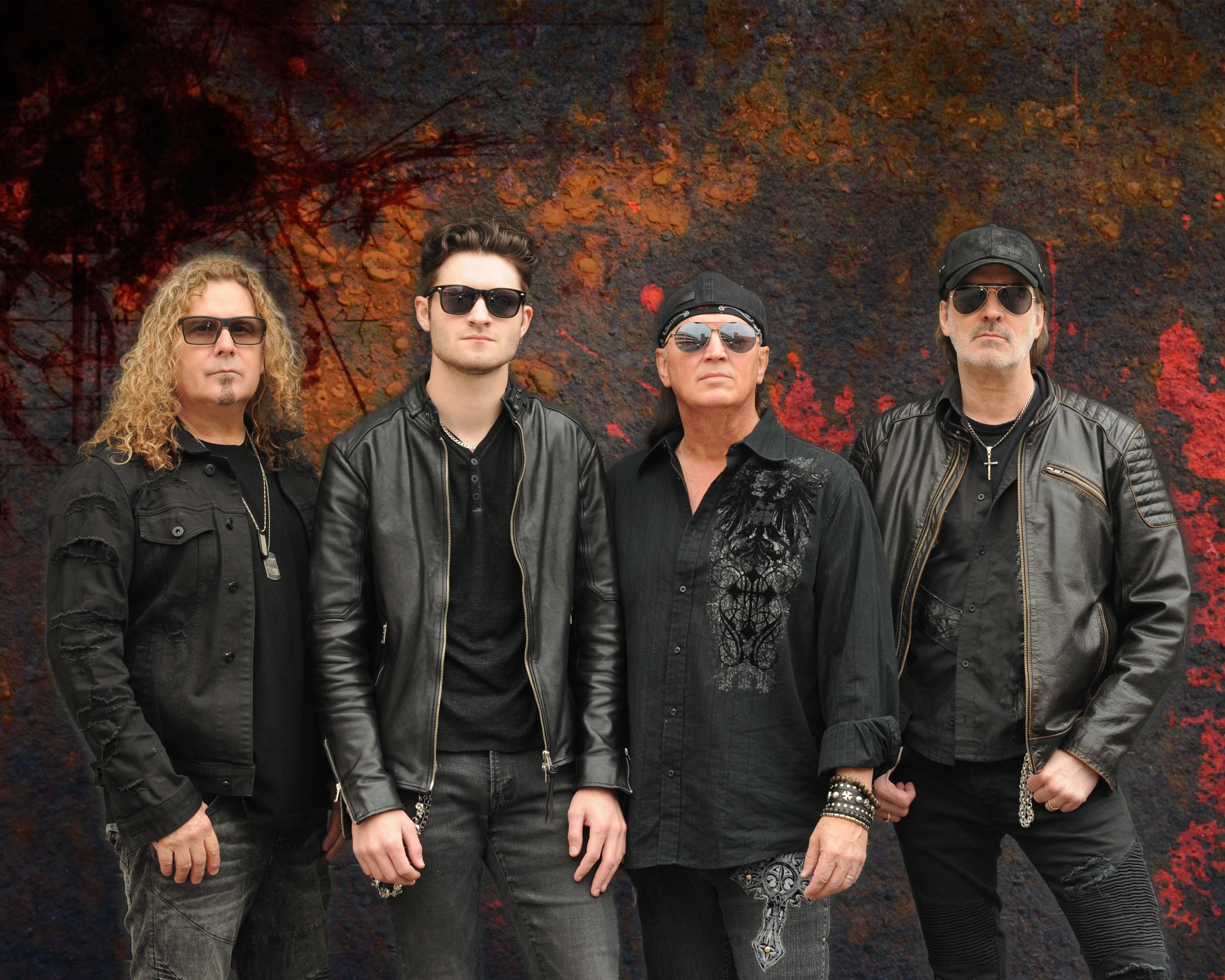
- FireHouse members from left to right: Michael Foster, Nate Peck, Allen McKenzie, and Bill Leverty in 2024

Background information
- Also known as: White Heat (1984–1989)
- Origin: Richmond, Virginia, U.S.
- Genres: Glam metal; hard rock
- Years active: 1984–present
- Labels: Epic; Pony Canyon; FireHouse Music; Justin Case Productions
- Members: Bill Leverty; Michael Foster; Allen McKenzie; Nate Peck
- Past members: C. J. Snare; Perry Richardson; Bruce Waibel; Dario Seixas

FireHouse (also Firehouse) is an American hard rock band that formed in 1984 in Richmond, Virginia. They then moved to Charlotte, North Carolina, where they signed with Epic Records in 1989. The band reached stardom during the early 1990s with charting rock singles including "All She Wrote," Don't Treat Me Bad," and "Reach for the Sky," as well as with power ballads "Love of a Lifetime," "When I Look into Your Eyes," and "I Live My Life for You." At the 1992 American Music Awards, FireHouse won the award for "Favorite New Heavy Metal/Hard Rock Artist."

As their contemporaries fell by the wayside in the United States during 1992, the band remained popular through the ensuing decade in Asia, mainly in Japan, Thailand, India, Malaysia, the Philippines, Indonesia and Singapore. FireHouse continually released new material in the 1990s and early 2000s, catering to Southeast Asian audiences. As of the 2020s, FireHouse mostly tours theaters in the United States. FireHouse is estimated to have sold over 7 million albums worldwide since their debut.

During FireHouse's most successful period, the band included vocalist/keyboardist C. J. Snare, guitarist Bill Leverty, drummer Michael Foster and bassist Perry Richardson. The band currently consists of Leverty, Foster, bassist Allen McKenzie (since 2004), and vocalist Nate Peck (since 2023).

== History ==
=== Early beginnings ===
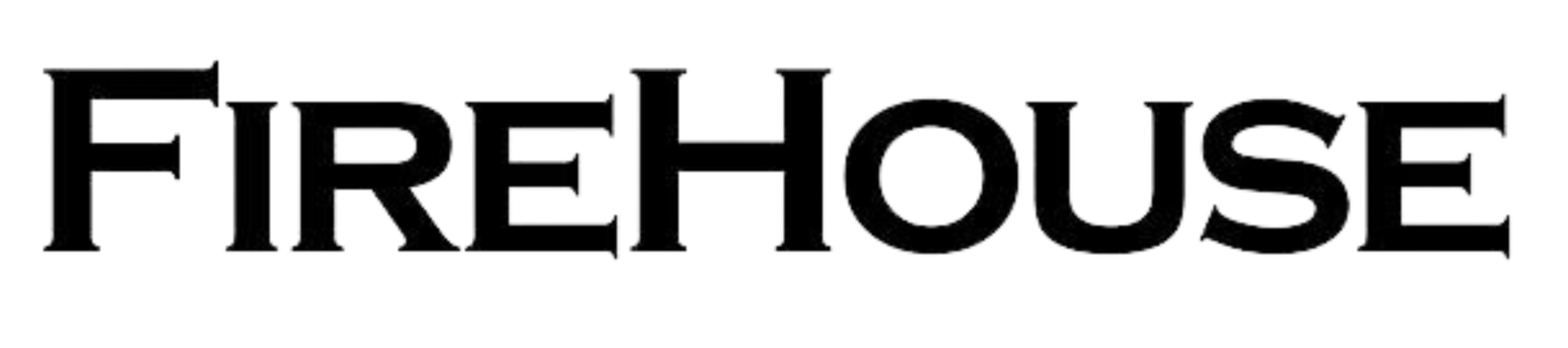
Band font logo

FireHouse can be traced back to 1984, when guitarist Bill Leverty required a drummer for his band concept, White Heat. After over 20 auditions, co-founder Michael Foster answered an ad and was hired by Leverty due to his musical recollective abilities, with the duo soon becoming musical partners. When White Heat wasn't on tour, Leverty and Foster would visit rock clubs, and soon by chance they saw fellow hard rock band Maxx Warrior perform. With Maxx Warrior were singer C. J. Snare and bassist Perry Richardson. Upon witnessing their performance, Leverty and Foster became determined to merge their talents as one act. Maxx Warrior soon broke up, and Leverty sent Snare some of his songs, asking Snare to sing on White Heat's demo tape. Yielding promising results, Leverty and Foster invited Snare to be the band's vocalist for a show in Virginia several weeks later.

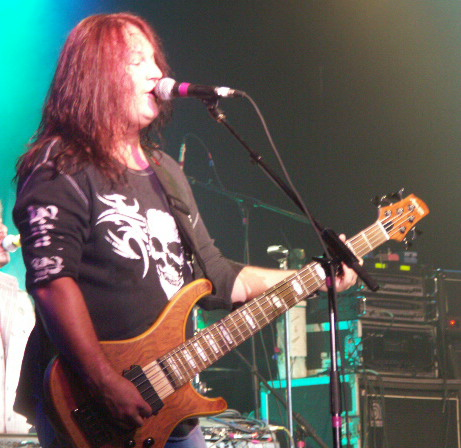
FireHouse bassist Allen McKenzie in North Dakota in 2007

Composed by 1987 of CJ Snare, Bill Leverty, Cosby Ellis (guitar, departed 1989), and Michael Foster, White Heat took their tape to Perry Richardson following the departure of bassist Richard Smith. Richardson was eager, but had made a six-month commitment to his current band. Later in 1988, Richardson joined White Heat. The band moved to Charlotte, North Carolina and began recording demos in Leverty's bedroom, doing so during the day and playing shows at night to earn income. Since their established name, White Heat, was trademarked, the band chose FireHouse instead.

In December 1989, Michael Caplan of Epic Records flew to Charlotte, NC to see a FireHouse show, and told the band immediately following the performance that they were ready for a record deal. The band went into the studio with David Prater as producer. Prater, who later produced bands such as Dream Theater and having drummed with Santana, produced the band's first two albums.

=== Success in the 1990s ===
The band's self-titled debut in 1990, FireHouse, was met with much critical acclaim. The band won the American Music Award for Best New Hard Rock/Heavy Metal Band of 1992 (which the band also presented the same category to grunge band and Epic Records labelmate Pearl Jam in 1993), Metal Edge Magazine's Best New Band of 1991, Young Guitar Magazine's Best Newcomer of 1991, and Music Life Magazine's reader's pop poll Best Newcomer of the Year 1992. The band's first album sold over two million copies in the United States, and was certified double platinum by the RIAA. The band's third and most successful single, "Love of a Lifetime", reached No. 3 selling over 500,000 copies. Other singles also charted including the harder-rocking "Don't Treat Me Bad" at No. 14. The first single from the album, "Shake & Tumble" enjoyed success on the radio and brought attention to the band, but it failed to chart on the Pop charts, although it did at Metal radio. The album went on to become certified gold in Canada, Singapore, and Japan.

The band followed their impressively received debut with Hold Your Fire in 1992. Although not as successful as its predecessor due to the recent explosion of grunge and alternative rock, Hold Your Fire produced three more charting singles and was certified gold in the US. To date, Hold Your Fire has soundscanned over 873,000 copies in the United States alone. Singles from the album included "Sleeping with You", "Reach for the Sky", and the power ballad "When I Look into Your Eyes". The latter single became a top 10 hit in the United States.

For the band's third album, aptly titled 3, they changed producers. Ron Nevison, who had served as producer for Ozzy Osbourne, UFO, Europe, Heart, and many other groups, produced this album. While the band's success had waned in the United States by 3's release in 1995, the album brought them more success overseas than ever before. Despite the album not selling well in the United States compared to previous albums, it was certified gold in several Asian countries, giving the band an opportunity to tour in countries like India and Thailand. The lead single from the album, "I Live My Life for You", was the band's third Top 40 ballad in the United States. Snare remarked that despite drastic changes in the industry, FireHouse was the only band of its genre that managed to have a Top 40 hit as late as 1995, without having to make drastic changes to their sound. 3's follow-up, Good Acoustics, was a collection of acoustic arrangements of several of their hits, as well as four new songs. The album, produced by the band's guitarist Bill Leverty, went gold in six countries including Malaysia, Thailand, and the Philippines. Tracks "In Your Perfect World", "You Are My Religion", and "Love Don't Care" became hits in many Asian countries. After the album's release, the band launched their second tour of Asia which ended in late 1996. It was followed by another tour of Indonesia, Thailand, and Japan in February 1997, including several sold-out shows. The band returned to Southeast Asia in July and played an unprecedented 25 city sold-out tour of Indonesia.

After this time, the band asked to be released from their contract due to their label's lack of promotion in the United States, after eight years of being signed to Epic Records in 1989. They made a significant change when they signed with Pony Canyon from Japan. With the decline in popularity among rock acts of the 1980s in the US, and their steady fame in Asia and elsewhere abroad, they agreed to release Category 5 with their new label. They toured heavily throughout Asia during 1998 and 1999, achieving great success with their album. They continued to tour heavily in the United States as well, performing on the first ever "Rock Never Stops Tour" all over America in 1998. This tour featured fellow 1980s rock bands including Slaughter and Quiet Riot. On April 22, 1999, FireHouse recorded a live show in Osaka, Japan, and released it with the title Bring 'Em Out Live later that year.

=== 2000 and beyond ===
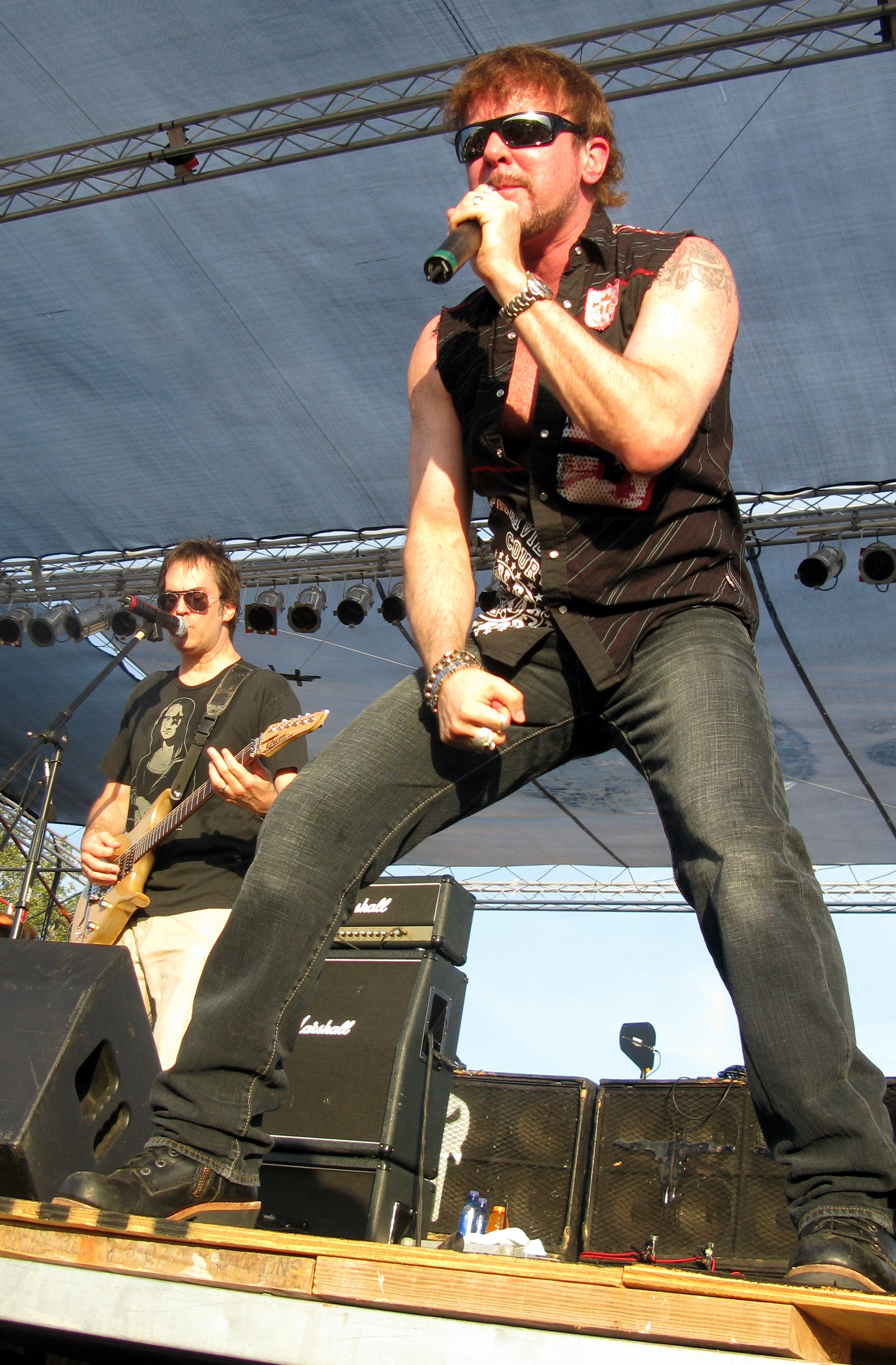
FireHouse, 2008. Vocalist and songwriter CJ Snare with guitarist and songwriter Bill Leverty

Sometime in 2000, the band parted ways with bassist Perry Richardson due to personal conflict and hired Bruce Waibel, who had played bass in the Gregg Allman Band for 10 years. Leverty met Waibel in Sarasota, Florida, and was impressed by his musicianship. When the band had an opening for a bassist due to Richardson's departure, Leverty contacted Waibel and asked him to join the band. With Waibel, they recorded O_{2} (2000), and toured on the Metal Edge 2002 tour with Dokken, Ratt, Warrant, and L.A. Guns. After the twelve-week tour, Waibel parted ways with the band to spend more time with his family. In 2003, Waibel committed suicide, aged 45. Guitarist Bill Leverty expressed the band's sadness over his death in a statement shortly after the news broke. Initially, Waibel was replaced by Brazilian bassist Dario Seixas, who played on the band's 2003 album Prime Time, but Seixas left the band shortly after. Following an announcement that the band were in need of a bass player, Allen McKenzie, then-bassist for Jani Lane's solo project, sent in his audition tape, and was subsequently hired.

In December 2004, FireHouse became the first major international rock band to play concert dates in northeast India. The band's first Indian concert date was in Shillong, followed by two more dates in Dimapur, and Aizawl. The band's first Indian date, in Shillong when the Maharaja of Tripura Kirit Pradyot Deb Burman invited them, took place in front of a sold out stadium crowd of over 40,000, setting a record for that city. The band continued to tour extensively in the United States throughout the 2000s, especially in the midwest, and played festivals including Rocklahoma. In a March 2007 interview, when asked about a prospective next album, guitarist Bill Leverty said "we plan on going into the studio this coming winter. Hopefully, we'll be able to get all the songs together and record them for a spring/summer release." It is unknown if any finished recordings materialized from these sessions.

In 2011 the band released their eighth studio album titled Full Circle, which featured re-recorded versions of some of their older tracks. The 2010s saw FireHouse continuing their established consistent touring schedule. Since 2015, FireHouse have restricted their tours to solely North America.

Longtime FireHouse singer C. J. Snare died on April 5, 2024. At the time of his death, Snare had taken a hiatus from touring due to health concerns, and American Idol season 21 contestant Nate Peck had been filling in on vocals since late 2023. A month after Snare's death, FireHouse announced that Peck would officially be taking over as the band's new frontman.

Following Peck's induction as vocalist, the band briefly toured in Indonesia, their first Asian concerts in nearly a decade. On June 25, 2025, the band released their first single with Peck on vocals titled "Mighty Fine Lady", which is also the band’s first new material in over twenty years. In March 2026, another new single with Nate Peck, "Midnight Gasoline", was released.

== Band members ==
Current members

- Bill Leverty – guitar, backing vocals (1984–present)
- Michael Foster – drums, percussion, backing vocals (1984–present)
- Allen McKenzie – bass, backing vocals (2003–present)
- Nate Peck – lead vocals (2024–present; substitute 2023)

Former members

- Chip Tunstall – lead vocals (1984–1988)
- Samuel Cherry – guitar, backing vocals (1984–1986)
- Richard Smith (a.k.a Rich Bitchin) – bass, backing vocals (1984–1988)
- Cosby Ellis – guitar, backing vocals (1986–1989)
- C. J. Snare – lead vocals, occasional keyboards (1988–2024; his death)
- Perry Richardson – bass, backing vocals (1988–2000)
- Bruce Waibel – bass, backing vocals (2000–2003)
- Dario Seixas – bass, backing vocals (2003–2004)

Touring substitutes

- Andrew Freeman – lead vocals (2021)

== Discography ==
=== Studio albums ===
- FireHouse (1990)
- Hold Your Fire (1992)
- 3 (1995)
- Good Acoustics (1996)
- Category 5 (1998)
- O_{2} (2000)
- Prime Time (2003)

== See also ==
- List of glam metal bands and artists
