= Bill Leverty =

American guitarist

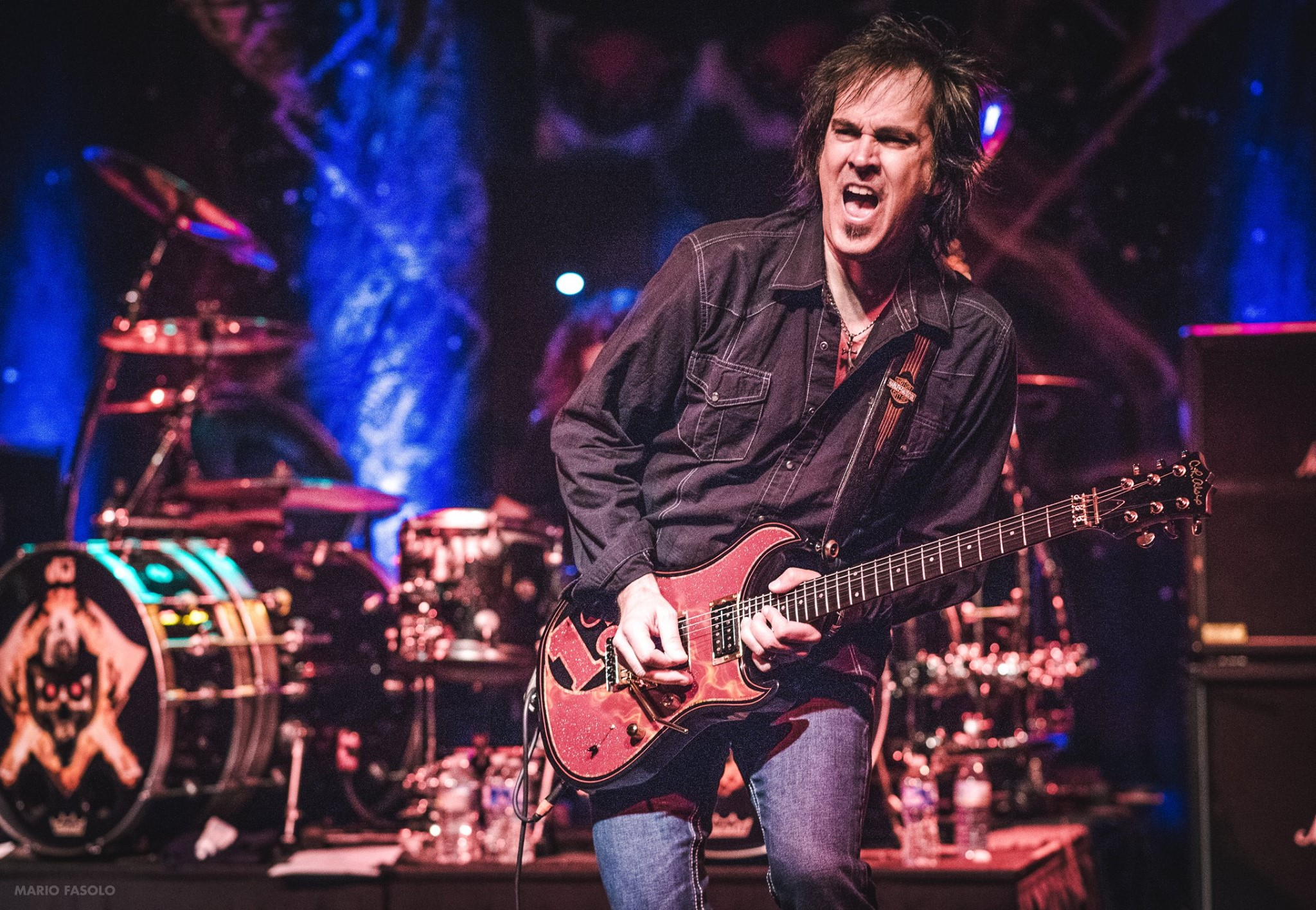

Background information
- Born: William G. Leverty II; January 30, 1967 (age 59); Richmond, Virginia, U.S.
- Genres: Hard rock, glam metal
- Occupations: Musician, songwriter
- Instrument: Guitar
- Years active: 1984–present
- Member of: FireHouse
- Formerly of: White Heat
- Website: leverty.com

William G. Leverty II (born January 30, 1967) is an American guitarist. He is a founding member of the hard rock band FireHouse and has been responsible for writing many of the band's hit songs. Throughout the 2000s, Leverty has also pursued a solo career, releasing five albums: Wanderlust, Southern Exposure, Deep South, Drive, and Divided We Fall. Following the death of founding member and vocalist CJ Snare, Leverty alongside drummer Michael Foster are the only original members still active in the band.

== Biography ==
Born in Richmond, Virginia, Leverty's parents gave him a guitar when he was 4 years old, although he didn't take playing guitar seriously until he was 14. Around this same time, Leverty began to study music theory in high school. In 1984, Leverty's band, White Heat, held auditions for drummers and it was here that Leverty met fellow Richmond native and his longtime bandmate and collaborator, Michael Foster. In 1988, Leverty and Foster's White Heat combined forces with C.J. Snare and Perry Richardson. Before signing to Epic Records in 1989, White Heat changed their name to FireHouse. Firehouse went on to sell over 7 million albums worldwide, as well as win the 1991 American Music Award for "Favorite New Heavy Metal/Hard Rock Artist."

In 1993, Leverty won an ASCAP songwriter award for Firehouse's highest charting single, "Love of a Lifetime."

In 2004, after 15 years with Firehouse, Leverty released his first solo album, Wanderlust. On October 9, 2007, Leverty released his first instrumental and second solo album, Southern Exposure, followed by a third album, Deep South, in 2009. His fourth solo album, Drive, was released in February 2013. Leverty released his fifth album, Divided We Fall, in 2020.

In 2013, Leverty formed a supergroup, Flood the Engine. FTE is composed of Leverty, Jimmy Kunes (Cactus), Keith Horne (Tanya Tucker, Waylon Jennings, Trisha Yearwood, Luke Bryan), and Andre Labelle (Vinnie Vincent). Flood the Engine released their only album, Flood The Engine, in 2013.

== Gear ==
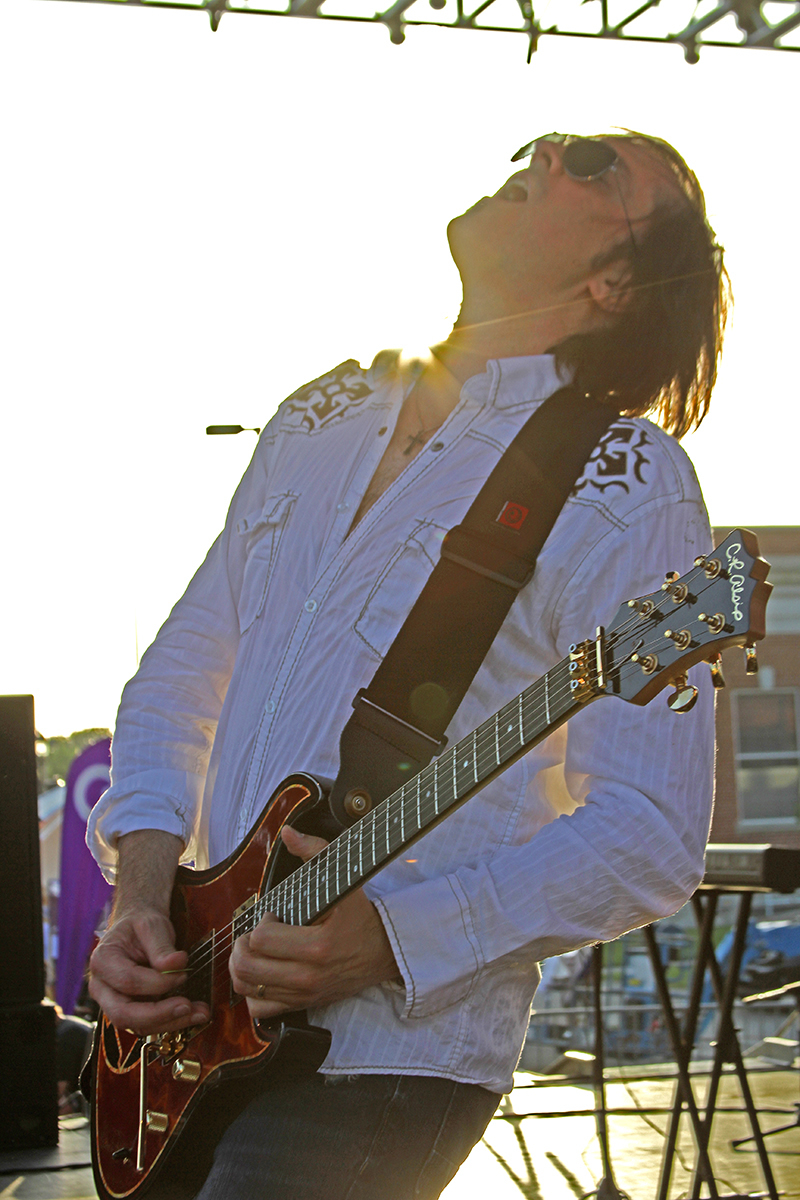
Leverty playing his C.R. Alsip Guitar "Lucky 13"

Throughout the 1990s, Leverty held an endorsement deal with Yamaha Guitar Development. He played the Yahama Pacifica model for 16 years.

On July 4, 2006, GREM USA announced that Leverty signed an exclusive endorsement with the guitar manufacturer. GREM guitars produced "The Bill Leverty Free Radical" model.

In 2012, Leverty began working with C.R. Alsip Guitars and became the guitar manufacturer's first endorsee. Leverty worked hand in hand with C.R. Alsip's master luthier & owner, Jake Willoughby, in the prototyping stages. Soon thereafter, Leverty's C.R. Alsip guitar known as "Lucky 13" was born. Leverty's second Alsip, "Goldie," was pictured on his fourth solo album, Drive.

== Personal life ==
Leverty married his wife Kris in 1996; together they have one child.

== Discography ==
=== Studio albums ===
- Wanderlust (2004)
- Southern Exposure (2007)
- Deep South (2009)
- Drive (2013)
- Divided We Fall (2020)

=== with Firehouse ===
- FireHouse (1990)
- Hold Your Fire (1992)
- 3 (1995)
- Good Acoustics (1996)
- Category 5 (1998)
- O_{2} (2000)
- Prime Time (2003)
- Full Circle (2011)

=== with Flood the Engine ===
- Flood the Engine (2013)
