= Michael Foster (drummer) =

American drummer

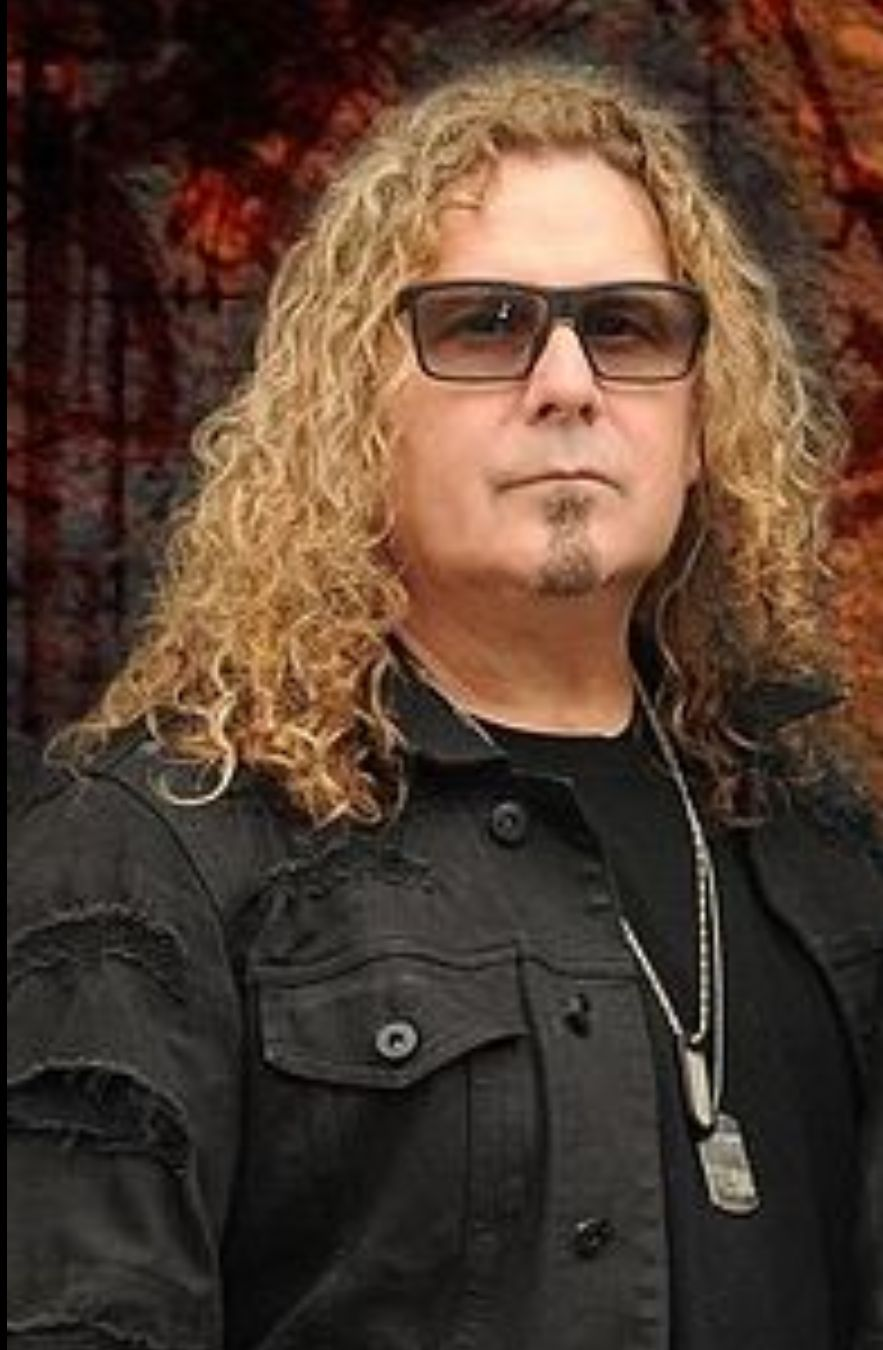
- Foster in 2024

Background information
- Born: December 9, 1964 (age 61)
- Origin: Richmond, Virginia, U.S.
- Genres: Hard rock; glam metal
- Occupation: Drummer
- Years active: 1985–present
- Member of: FireHouse
- Website: www.fosterdrums.com

Michael Foster (born December 9, 1964) is an American drummer who is a founding member of the hard rock band FireHouse. He and Bill Leverty are the only original members still active in the band following the death of vocalist CJ Snare.

== Biography ==
Foster was born in Richmond, Virginia to James Ernest and Patricia (née Valenti) Foster. He has a younger brother called Daniel Sean. When he was five years old, his mother gave him his first real drum set and he dedicated hours to practice it. He played in school bands and eventually learned music theory as well as other percussive instruments.

In 1984, Foster auditioned for a band called White Heat, in which Bill Leverty was the guitarist. He got the job, and eventually they met C.J. Snare and Perry Richardson through touring in the Carolinas. The four joined forces as White Heat in 1988 and changed their name to Firehouse prior to their first release with Epic Records in 1990. Firehouse went on to sell over 7 million albums worldwide and have a number of international hits.

Foster filled in for Warrant drummer Steven Sweet from December 2012 until February 2013 while Sweet recovered from a neck injury.

== Personal life ==
Foster married Lori Mingee on September 15, 1995. They have two daughters and one son together.
