= C. J. Snare =

American rock singer (1959–2024)

C.J. Snare
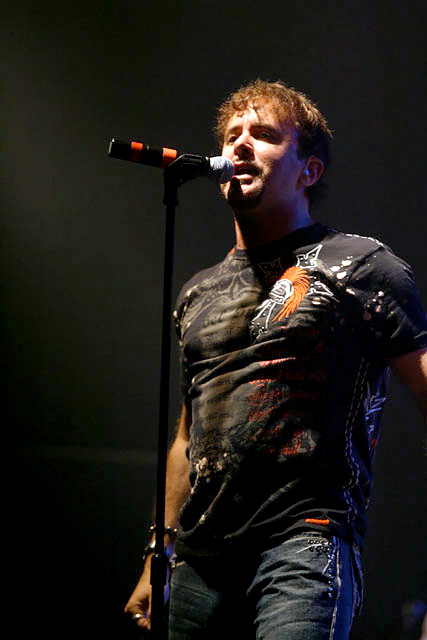
- Snare performing in 2009

Background information
- Born: Carl Jeffrey Snare; December 14, 1959; Washington, D.C., U.S.
- Died: April 5, 2024 (aged 64) Orlando, Florida, U.S.
- Genres: Hard rock, glam metal
- Occupations: Singer, songwriter, record producer
- Years active: 1980–2023
- Formerly of: FireHouse
- Website: C. J. Snare on Facebook

Carl Jeffrey Snare (December 14, 1959 – April 5, 2024) was an American singer best known for being the frontman and founding member of the hard rock/glam metal band FireHouse.

Snare co-wrote most of the band's songs and has had seven songs chart on the Billboard Hot 100 Charts, four of which were top 40. He also appeared periodically with his other band, Rubicon Cross, and occasionally appeared with Scrap Metal.

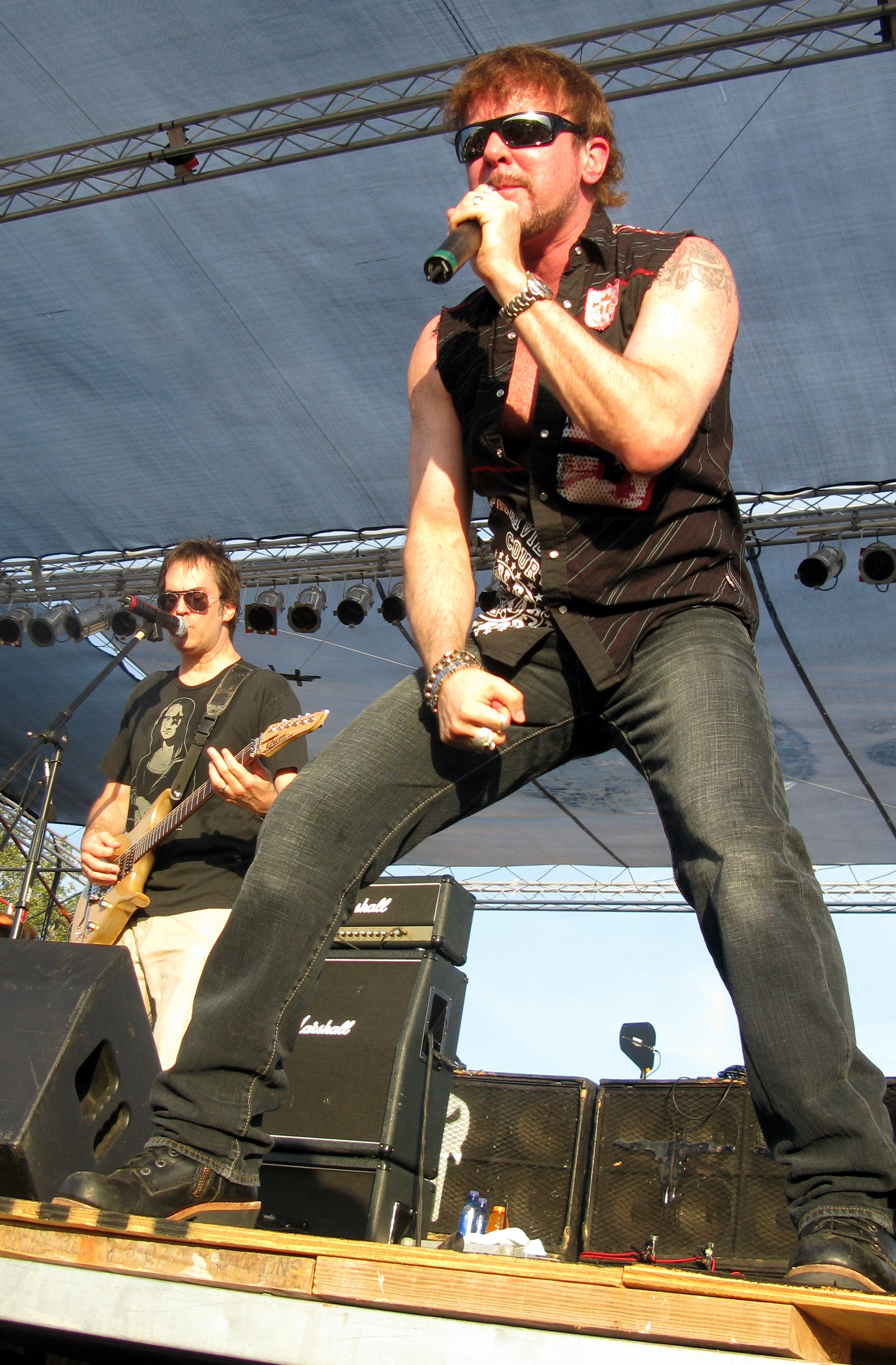
Snare onstage in 2008

== Personal life and death ==
Carl Jeffrey Snare was born on December 14, 1959, in Washington, D.C to Buck and Barbara Snare. He had two sons and one daughter.

In September 2020, he was diagnosed with stage IV colon cancer. In September 2023, he took a hiatus from FireHouse to undergo abdominal surgery in October. Although he intended to return to the band for their shows in summer 2024, he died on April 5, 2024. He was 64.

== Discography ==
=== With Maxx Warrior ===
- Maxx Warrior (1986)

=== With FireHouse ===
- FireHouse – August 21, 1990 – No. 21 US
- Hold Your Fire – June 16, 1992 – No. 23 US
- 3 – April 11, 1995 – No. 66 US
- Good Acoustics – October 8, 1996
- Category 5 – September 2, 1998
- O_{2} – November 7, 2000
- Prime Time – August 12, 2003
- Full Circle – June 2011

=== Live albums with FireHouse ===
- Bring 'Em Out Live – December 1999

=== C.J. Snare ===
- "Do What You Believe (Single) Liberty N Justice-Light It Up (2010)
- "God Rest Ye Merry Gentlemen (Single) A Christmas Gift (2010)
- "Oh Come Emmanuel (Single) A Christmas Gift (2011)
- "Pride (In The Name Of Love) Liberty 'N Justice Cigar Chronicles Vol. 1 (2013)
- " The Rest of My Life (Single) From Asia With Love (2013)

=== Rubicon Cross ===
- "Rubicon Cross – Limited Edition EP (2011)
- "Rubicon Cross – Single – Locked and Loaded (2012) featured on CodeMasters "Dirt" Showdown Video Game
- "Rubicon Cross – CD – Standard Version (2014) released 5/19 on INgrooves Distributed by Universal Music Group
- "Rubicon Cross – Deluxe CD – (2014) Best Buy Exclusive released 5/19 on INgrooves Distributed by Universal Music Group
- "Rubicon Cross – Digital Album – (2014) released 5/19 on INgrooves
- "Rubicon Cross – Deluxe Japanese CD – (2014) released on King Records

=== Production work ===
- "Do What You Believe (Single) Liberty N Justice-Light It Up (2010)
- "God Rest Ye Merry Gentlemen (Single) A Christmas Gift (2010)
- "Oh Come Emmanuel (Single) A Christmas Gift (2011)
- "Guitarcadia = Xander Demos (2012)
- " Liberty 'N Justice (Various Artists) Cigar Chronicles Vol. 1 (2013)
- "Already Ghosts = Hymn of a New Dark Age (2013)
- " The Rest of My Life (Single) From Asia With Love (2013)
- " Rubicon Cross = Debut Album (2014) Engineering Credit
