= List of Quiet Riot members =

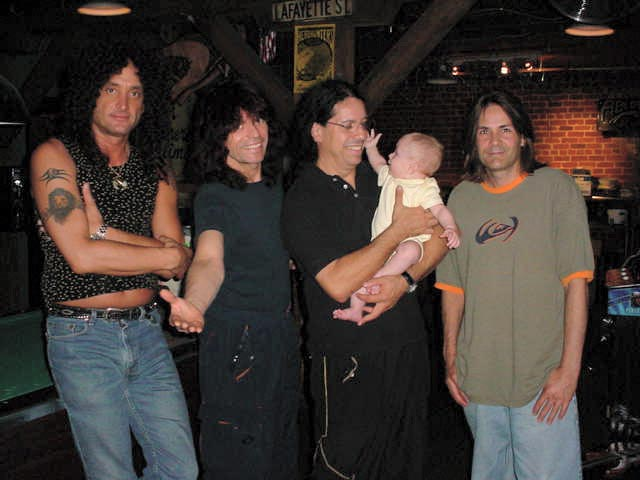
Top: The classic Metal Health lineup of Quiet Riot in 2002, left to right: Kevin DuBrow, Rudy Sarzo, Frankie Banali and Carlos Cavazo.

Bottom: The current lineup of Quiet Riot as of 2026, clockwise from top left: Sarzo, Alex Grossi, John Torra and Johnny Kelly.

Quiet Riot is an American heavy metal band from Los Angeles, California. Formed in May 1975, the group originally included vocalist Kevin DuBrow, guitarist Randy Rhoads, bassist Kelly Garni and drummer Drew Forsyth. The current lineup features bassist Rudy Sarzo (who first joined in 1978), guitarist Alex Grossi (who joined in 2004), drummer Johnny Kelly (who joined in 2020), and vocalist John Torra (who joined in 2026).

== History ==
=== 1975–1989 ===
Quiet Riot was formed in 1975 by vocalist Kevin DuBrow, guitarist Randy Rhoads, bassist Kelly Garni and drummer Drew Forsyth. Garni left in late 1978, after an altercation with DuBrow in which he reportedly almost shot the vocalist. He was later replaced by Rudy Sarzo, who was credited on Quiet Riot II despite not performing on the album. Rhoads left in late 1979, after he was hired by Ozzy Osbourne to join his solo band. Rhoads and DuBrow offered the guitarist position to Greg Leon, who joined early the next year alongside bassist Gary Van Dyke, and Drew Forsyth still on drums. The new lineup subsequently dropped the Quiet Riot moniker and briefly worked under DuBrow's name, changing personnel several times, although no new music was released except some unreleased songs that were supposed to be on a Quiet Riot III album. Only 1 new song, titled "Thunderbird", was performed.

The band returned in September 1982 with DuBrow, Sarzo, guitarist Carlos Cavazo and drummer Frankie Banali. Sarzo would later leave in January 1985, with Chuck Wright (who had performed with the group during its tenure as "DuBrow") taking his place. Following several years of "outlandish and bratty behavior", DuBrow was fired from Quiet Riot in February 1987, with the remaining members of the band claiming that the vocalist "had become a very serious detriment to Quiet Riot". He was replaced by Rough Cutt frontman Paul Shortino, while Wright was replaced by Sean McNabb around the same time. Both new members performed on the band's sixth studio QR, released in October 1988. DuBrow sued Quiet Riot over use of the band name in 1989, leading to the group's dissolution.

=== 1991–2007 ===
The vocalist subsequently formed Little Women, later to be renamed ‘Heat’ with English blues guitarist Sean Manning and composed songs together for a new album. They were joined by bassist Kenny Hillery and drummer Pat Ashby… the band was later renamed Quiet Riot once again upon the return of Cavazo in June 1991. Ashby was soon replaced by Bobby Rondinelli, who performed on part of the 1993 release Terrified, before Banali returned to complete the album. Wright subsequently returned to the band in 1994, remaining for three years before Sarzo took his place again after reuniting with his former bandmates at a party hosted by Marilyn Manson. The lineup of Quiet Riot remained stable for six years, during which time it released two studio albums – Alive and Well and Guilty Pleasures – except for three concerts in August 2002, in which former vocalist Shortino filled in for DuBrow for three concerts when DuBrow became ill with the flu. In September 2003, it was announced that the band had broken up following differences between members.

The group's breakup was short-lived, however, as just over a year later Quiet Riot returned with a lineup including DuBrow, Banali, former bassist Wright, and new guitarist Alex Grossi. Grossi was briefly replaced by Tracii Guns in December 2005, although he left after just a month due to musical differences. Neil Citron recorded guitar for the band's eleventh studio album Rehab, while Billy Morris took over as touring guitarist. Wright was also replaced briefly, by Tony Franklin in the studio, before both he and Grossi returned to the band. Quiet Riot remained active for another year, when frontman DuBrow was found dead on November 25, 2007. It was announced later that the singer had died of an "accidental cocaine overdose". Banali later announced that the group would not continue.

=== 2010 onwards ===
Three years after DuBrow's death, Quiet Riot reformed with new vocalist Mark Huff joining Grossi, Wright and Banali. Huff was fired in January 2012, with former Montrose frontman Keith St. John taking his place for a string of shows in February. Scott Vokoun was later enlisted as Huff's permanent replacement in March. Vokoun remained in the group until the following November, when he was replaced by Love/Hate frontman Jizzy Pearl. Pearl contributed to the band's first studio album in eight years, 2014's Quiet Riot 10, before leaving in December 2016 to focus on his solo career, with Seann Nicols taking his place. Nicols remained for only a few months, however, before he was replaced by James Durbin in March 2017. Durbin later re-recorded Nichols's vocals for the album Road Rage. In 2019, Durbin left to focus on his solo career, with Pearl returning to the band. On August 20, 2020, Banali died from pancreatic cancer, at the age of 68. He was eventually replaced by Danzig and former Type O Negative drummer Johnny Kelly. Nearly a year after Banali's death, Quiet Riot announced that bassist Rudy Sarzo was rejoining the band after an eighteen-year hiatus, once again replacing Chuck Wright.

In July 2026, Quiet Riot announced Pearl would be leaving the band and opened vocalist auditions to the public. They later announced his replacement as 23-year-old John Torra, who had received significant attention on social media for his audition videos.

== Members ==
=== Current ===
| Image | Name | Years active | Instruments | Release contributions |
|---|---|---|---|---|
| | Rudy Sarzo | 1978–1980; 1982–1985; 1987; 1997–2003; 2021–present | bass; backing vocals | Metal Health (1983); Condition Critical (1984); Alive and Well (1999); Guilty Pleasures (2001); Live in the 21st Century (2003); Live & Rare Volume 1 (2005); Live at the US Festival 1983 (2012); Quiet Riot 10 (2014) |
| | Alex Grossi | 2004–2005; 2006–2007; 2010–present | guitar, backing vocals | Rehab (2006) – two tracks only; Quiet Riot 10 (2014); Road Rage (2017); One Night in Milan (2019); Hollywood Cowboys (2019) |
| | Johnny Kelly | 2019–2020 (touring); 2020–present | drums | none |
| | John Torra | 2026–present | vocals | none |

=== Former ===
| Image | Name | Years active | Instruments | Release contributions |
|---|---|---|---|---|
| | Kevin DuBrow | 1975–1980; 1982–1987; 1991–2003; 2004–2007 (until his death) | lead vocals; occasional guitar | all Quiet Riot releases from Quiet Riot (1978) to Quiet Riot 10 (2014), except QR (1988) and '89 Live in Japan (2004) |
| | Drew Forsyth | 1975–1980 | drums, backing vocals | Quiet Riot (1978); Quiet Riot II (1979); The Randy Rhoads Years (1993) |
| | Randy Rhoads | 1975–1979 (died 1982) | guitar, backing vocals | |
| | Kelly Garni | 1975–1978 | bass, backing vocals | |
| | Greg Leon | 1979–1980 | guitar | none |
| | Carlos Cavazo | 1982–1989; 1991–2003 | guitar; backing vocals | all Quiet Riot releases from Metal Health (1983) to Live & Rare Volume 1 (2005); Live at the US Festival 1983 (2012) |
| | Frankie Banali | 1982–1989; 1993–2003; 2004–2007; 2010–2020 (until his death) | drums; percussion; occasional backing vocals | all Quiet Riot releases from Metal Health (1983) to Hollywood Cowboys (2019) except The Randy Rhoads Years (1993) |
| | Jizzy Pearl | 2013–2016; 2019–2026 | lead vocals | Quiet Riot 10 (2014) |
| | Kjell Benner | 1985 | bass | —N/a |
| | Jeff Naideau | 1986 (touring only) | Keyboards | —N/a |
| | Chuck Wright | 1982 (session only); 1985–1987; 1994–1997; 2004–2006; 2006–2007; 2010–2021 | bass; backing vocals | Metal Health (1983) - two tracks only; QR III (1986); Down to the Bone (1995); Live & Rare Volume 1 (2005); Quiet Riot 10 (2014); Road Rage (2017); One Night in Milan (2019); Hollywood Cowboys (2019) |
| | Paul Shortino | 1987-1989; 2002 (touring substitute) | lead vocals | QR (1988); '89 Live in Japan (2004) |
| | Sean McNabb | 1987–1989; 2006 | bass; backing vocals | QR (1988); '89 Live in Japan (2004) |
| | Kenny Hillery | 1991–1994 (died 1996) | bass | Terrified (1993) |
| | Pat Ashby | 1991 | drums | —N/a |
| | Bobby Rondinelli | 1991–1993 | drums | Terrified (1993) |
| | Matt Littell | 1995 | bass | Down to the Bone (1995) |
| | Bjorn Englen | 1995 | bass | —N/a |
| | Ty Westerhoff | 1995 | bass | —N/a |
| | Tracii Guns | 2005–2006 | guitar | —N/a |
| | Neil Citron | 2006 (session only) | guitar | Rehab (2006) |
| | Tony Franklin | 2006 (session only) | bass | Rehab (2006) |
| | Billy Morris | 2006 | guitar | —N/a |
| | Steve Fister | 2006 | guitar | —N/a |
| | Mark Huff | 2010–2012 | lead vocals | —N/a |
| | Keith St. John | 2012 | lead vocals | —N/a |
| | Scott Vokoun | 2012–2013 | lead vocals | —N/a |
| | Seann Nicols | 2016–2017 | lead vocals | "The Seeker" - single (2017) (Note: "The Seeker" was released as an instant gratification track for customers who pre-ordered Road Rage on March 1, 2017. Nicols was fired from the band, and his lyrics and vocals were replaced by Durbin's. The original album was never released.) |
| | James Durbin | 2017–2019 | lead vocals | Road Rage (2017); One Night in Milan (2019); Hollywood Cowboys (2019) |
| | Mike Dupke | 2019 (touring substitute only) | drums | —N/a |

== Line-ups ==
| Period | Members | Releases |
|---|---|---|
| May 1975 – late 1978 | Kevin DuBrow – lead vocals; Randy Rhoads – guitar, backing vocals; Kelly Garni – bass, backing vocals; Drew Forsyth – drums, backing vocals | Quiet Riot (1978); Quiet Riot II (1978); The Randy Rhoads Years (1993) |
| Late 1978 – November 1979 | Kevin DuBrow – lead vocals; Randy Rhoads – guitar, backing vocals; Rudy Sarzo – bass, backing vocals; Drew Forsyth – drums, backing vocals | none |
| November 1979 | Kevin DuBrow – lead vocals; Greg Leon – guitar; Rudy Sarzo – bass, backing vocals; Drew Forsyth – drums, backing vocals | none |
Band inactive November 1979- September 1982
| September 1982 – March 1985 | Kevin DuBrow – lead vocals; Carlos Cavazo – guitar, backing vocals; Rudy Sarzo – bass, backing vocals; Frankie Banali – drums | Metal Health (1983); Condition Critical (1984); Live at the US Festival, 1983 (2012) |
| March 1985 - late 1985 | Kevin DuBrow – lead vocals; Carlos Cavazo – guitar, backing vocals; Kjell Benner – bass; Frankie Banali – drums | none |
| January 1986 – February 1987 | Kevin DuBrow – lead vocals; Carlos Cavazo – guitar, backing vocals; Chuck Wright – bass, backing vocals; Frankie Banali – drums | QR III (1986) |
| 1987–1989 | Paul Shortino – lead vocals; Carlos Cavazo – guitar, backing vocals; Sean McNabb – bass, backing vocals; Frankie Banali – drums | QR (1988) |
Band inactive 1989–1991
| 1991 | Kevin DuBrow – lead vocals; Carlos Cavazo – guitar, backing vocals; Kenny Hillery – bass; Pat Ashby – drums | none |
| 1991–1993 | Kevin DuBrow – lead vocals; Carlos Cavazo – guitar, backing vocals; Kenny Hillery – bass; Bobby Rondinelli – drums | Terrified (1993) |
| 1993–1994 | Kevin DuBrow – lead vocals; Carlos Cavazo – guitar, backing vocals; Kenny Hillery – bass; Frankie Banali – drums | Terrified (1993) |
| 1994–1997 | Kevin DuBrow – lead vocals; Carlos Cavazo – guitar, backing vocals; Chuck Wright – bass, backing vocals; Frankie Banali – drums | Down to the Bone (1995) |
| 1997 – August 21, 2002 | Kevin DuBrow – lead vocals; Carlos Cavazo – guitar, backing vocals; Rudy Sarzo – bass, backing vocals; Frankie Banali – drums | Alive and Well (1999); Guilty Pleasures (2001) |
| August 22 – 24, 2002 | Paul Shortino – lead vocals; Carlos Cavazo – guitar, backing vocals; Rudy Sarzo – bass, backing vocals; Frankie Banali – drums | none |
| August 25, 2002 – September 2003 | Kevin DuBrow – lead vocals; Carlos Cavazo – guitar, backing vocals; Rudy Sarzo – bass, backing vocals; Frankie Banali – drums | none |
Band inactive September 2003 – October 2004
| October 2004 – December 2005 | Kevin DuBrow – lead vocals; Alex Grossi – guitar; Chuck Wright – bass, backing vocals; Frankie Banali – drums | none |
| December 2005 – January 2006 | Kevin DuBrow – lead vocals; Tracii Guns – guitar; Chuck Wright – bass, backing vocals; Frankie Banali – drums | none |
| Early – mid-2006 | Kevin DuBrow – vocals; Neil Citron – guitar (session); Tony Franklin – bass (session); Frankie Banali – drums | Rehab (2006) |
| 2006 | Kevin DuBrow – lead vocals; Billy Morris – guitar (touring); Chuck Wright – bass, backing vocals; Frankie Banali – drums | none |
| 2006 | Kevin DuBrow – lead vocals; Steve Fister – guitar (touring); Chuck Wright – bass, backing vocals; Frankie Banali – drums | none |
| June 2006 – November 2007 | Kevin DuBrow – lead vocals; Alex Grossi – guitar; Chuck Wright – bass, backing vocals; Frankie Banali – drums | none |
Band inactive November 2007 – September 2010
| September 2010 – January 2012 | Mark Huff – lead vocals; Alex Grossi – guitar; Chuck Wright – bass, backing vocals; Frankie Banali – drums | none |
| February 2012 | Keith St. John – lead vocals (touring); Alex Grossi – guitar; Chuck Wright – bass, backing vocals; Frankie Banali – drums | none |
| March 2012 – November 2013 | Scott Vokoun – lead vocals; Alex Grossi – guitar; Chuck Wright – bass, backing vocals; Frankie Banali – drums, backing vocals | none |
| November 2013 – December 2016 | Jizzy Pearl – lead vocals; Alex Grossi – guitar; Chuck Wright – bass, backing vocals; Frankie Banali – drums | Quiet Riot 10 (2014) |
| December 2016 – March 2017 | Seann Nicols – lead vocals; Alex Grossi – guitar; Chuck Wright – bass, backing vocals; Frankie Banali – drums | The Seeker (single) (2017) |
| March 2017 – September 2019 | James Durbin – lead vocals; Alex Grossi – guitar; Chuck Wright – bass, backing vocals; Frankie Banali – drums | Road Rage (2017); One Night in Milan (2019); Hollywood Cowboys (2019) |
| September 2019 – August 2020 | Jizzy Pearl – lead vocals; Alex Grossi – guitar; Chuck Wright – bass, backing vocals; Frankie Banali – drums | none |
| August 2020 – October 2021 | Jizzy Pearl – lead vocals; Alex Grossi – guitar; Chuck Wright – bass, backing vocals; Johnny Kelly – drums | none |
| November 2021 – September 2026 | Jizzy Pearl – lead vocals; Alex Grossi – guitar; Rudy Sarzo – bass, backing vocals; Johnny Kelly – drums | none |
| September 2026 – present | John Torra – lead vocals; Alex Grossi – guitar; Rudy Sarzo – bass, backing vocals; Johnny Kelly – drums | none |
