= Alive and Well (Quiet Riot album) =

Studio album by Quiet Riot
- Released: March 23, 1999
- Genres: Heavy metal, hard rock
- Length: 72:11
- Label: Cleopatra
- Producer: Bob Marlette

Quiet Riot chronology
| Greatest Hits (1996) | Alive and Well (1999) | Guilty Pleasures (2001) |

Alternative cover

Professional ratings
Review scores
| Source | Rating |
|---|---|
| Allmusic | 2/5 stars |

Alive and Well is the ninth studio album by glam metal band Quiet Riot. It was recorded following a reunion of the Metal Health-era lineup of Kevin DuBrow, Rudy Sarzo, Carlos Cavazo, and Frankie Banali. It featured eight new songs alongside updated versions of six of their classics, including "Cum On Feel The Noize", "Metal Health" and "Mama Weer All Crazee Now", as well as a cover of "Highway to Hell" by AC/DC. This track had previously been released on the AC/DC tribute album Thunderbolt: A Tribute To AC/DC.

The DuBrow/Perris penned "Slam Dunk" was first recorded in 1991 by Pretty Boy Floyd for the movie Switch.

== Track listing ==
All tracks are written by Frankie Banali, Carlos Cavazo, Kevin DuBrow and Rudy Sarzo, except where noted.

New material
| No. | Title | Length |
|---|---|---|
| 1. | "Don't Know What I Want" | 4:52 |
| 2. | "Angry" | 5:22 |
| 3. | "Alive and Well" | 5:03 |
| 4. | "The Ritual" | 6:07 |
| 5. | "Overworked and Underpaid" | 5:36 |
| 6. | "Slam Dunk (Way to Go!)" (DuBrow, Harry Perris) | 3:23 |
| 7. | "Too Much Information" | 4:28 |
| 8. | "Against the Wall" | 4:46 |
| 9. | "Highway to Hell" (AC/DC cover) (Bon Scott, Angus Young, Malcolm Young) | 3:59 |

Re-recordings
| No. | Title | Writer(s) | Length |
|---|---|---|---|
| 10. | "Sign of the Times" (originally from Condition Critical) (1984) | Cavazo, DuBrow | 4:53 |
| 11. | "Don't Wanna Let You Go" (originally from Metal Health) (1983) | Cavazo, DuBrow | 4:52 |
| 12. | "The Wild and the Young" (originally from QR III) (1986) | Banali, Cavazo, DuBrow, Spencer Proffer, Chuck Wright | 5:33 |
| 13. | "Mama Weer All Crazee Now" (Slade cover) (originally from Condition Critical) (1984) | Noddy Holder, Jim Lea | 3:22 |
| 14. | "Cum On Feel the Noize" (Slade cover) (originally from Metal Health) (1983) | Holder, Lea | 4:40 |
| 15. | "Metal Health (Bang Your Head)" (originally from Metal Health) (1983) | Banali, Cavazo, DuBrow | 5:15 |

The Japanese version of the CD has a bonus track titled "The Wait".

== Credits ==
=== Quiet Riot ===
- Kevin DuBrow – lead vocals
- Carlos Cavazo – guitars
- Rudy Sarzo – bass
- Frankie Banali – drums

=== Production ===
- Bob Marlette – producer
- Ken DiMaio – live sound engineer
