= Live & Rare Volume 1 =

Live album by Quiet Riot
- Released: March 23, 2005
- Recorded: 1983–1984
- Genre: Heavy metal
- Label: Demolition Records

Quiet Riot chronology
Guilty Pleasures (2001)	Live & Rare Volume 1 (2005)	Rehab (2006)

Live & Rare Volume 1 is a live album released by heavy metal band Quiet Riot.

It was rated three out of five stars by AllMusic.

== Track listing ==
All tracks are written by Kevin DuBrow, except where noted.

Quiet Riot Live & Rare Volume 1
No.	Title	Length
1.	"Let's Get Crazy"	6:35
2.	"Condition Critical" (Kevin Dubrow, Carlos Cavazo, Frankie Banali)	5:21
3.	"Run for Cover" (Carlos Cavazo, Kevin DuBrow)	3:34
4.	"Swinging Lumber" (Frankie Banali)	5:54
5.	"Winners Take All" (Randy Rhoads, Kevin DuBrow)	6:22
6.	"Cum on Feel the Noize" (Noddy Holder, Jim Lea)	6:58
7.	"Metal Health" (Carlos Cavazo, Kevin DuBrow, Frankie Banali, Tony Cavazo)	6:50
8.	"Danger Zone"	4:17
9.	"Gonna Have a Riot" (Randy Rhoads, Kevin DuBrow)	3:09
10.	"Thunderbird (Original DuBrow Demo)"	4:42
11.	"Love's a Bitch (Original DuBrow Demo)"	4:03
12.	"Let's Get Crazy (Original DuBrow Demo)"	3:56

== Credits ==
=== Quiet Riot ===
Tracks 1–9

- Kevin DuBrow: Vocals
- Carlos Cavazo: Guitar
- Rudy Sarzo: Bass
- Frankie Banali: Drums & Percussion

=== DuBrow ===
Tracks 10–12

- Kevin DuBrow: Vocals
- Bob Steffan: Guitar
- Chuck Wright: Bass
- Frankie Banali: Drums & Percussion

=== CD credits ===
- Live compilation produced by: Frankie Banali
- DuBrow demo produced by: Kevin DuBrow and Frankie Banali
- Mixed and mastered by: Neil Citron
- Cover model: Jen Hilton
- Live Sound Engineer: Ken DiMaio

== Notes ==
- The three demo tracks were recorded under the name DuBrow, not Quiet Riot, as during this period Quiet Riot were broken up.
