= Greatest Hits (Quiet Riot album) =

Greatest hits album by Quiet Riot
- Released: February 20, 1996
- Genre: Heavy metal
- Label: Sony

Quiet Riot chronology
Down to the Bone (1995)	Greatest Hits (1996)	Alive and Well (1999)

Greatest Hits is a greatest hits compilation by the band Quiet Riot released in 1996.

It was given a four-star rating by AllMusic.

== Track listing ==
1. "Cum on Feel the Noize"
2. "Bang Your Head (Metal Health)"
3. "Slick Black Cadillac"
4. "The Wild & the Young"
5. "Mama Weer All Crazee Now"
6. "Party All Night"
7. "The Joker"
8. "Stay with Me Tonight"
9. "Callin' the Shots"
10. "Bang Your Head (Metal Health)" (live)
11. "Let's Go Crazy" (live)
