= Laughing gas (disambiguation) =

Laughing gas, or nitrous oxide, is a colorless, non-flammable gas.

Laughing gas may also refer to:

- Laughing Gas (novel), a 1936 novel by P.G. Wodehouse
- Laughing Gas (1914 film), a film starring Charlie Chaplin
- Laughing Gas (film), several movie shorts
- "Laughing Gas" (instrumental), a song by Quiet Riot
- Reggie Attache (1894–1955), Native American professional football player nicknamed Laughing Gas
