= Down to the Bone (album) =

Studio album by Quiet Riot
- Released: March 1, 1995
- Recorded: 1994
- Genres: Heavy metal, hard rock
- Length: 68:45
- Label: Kamikaze
- Producer: Kevin DuBrow

Quiet Riot chronology
The Randy Rhoads Years (1993)	Down to the Bone (1995)	Greatest Hits (1996)

Down to the Bone is the eighth studio album by American glam metal band Quiet Riot, released by Kamikaze in 1995. It was recorded at Ocean Studios, Burbank Calif., The Track House, Van Nuys, Calif., and Paramount Studios, Hollywood, California.

== Background ==
After Quiet Riot reformed in the early 1990s, the 1993 album Terrified was released, although it failed to become a commercial success. The band soon recorded their eighth studio album, Down to the Bone, which was produced by lead vocalist Kevin DuBrow, with executive producer Ron Sobol. Like Terrified, the album was not a commercial success, and initially sold approximately 20,000 copies. Released via Kamikaze Records, a label purposely set up to release the album, the idea was that if the album became a success then the label would sign other bands that DuBrow would produce. In a 2011 interview with Sobol for Spark Plug magazine, interviewer Hugh Asnen asked of his work within the music scene into the 1990s. Sobol stated "In the mid-nineties Kevin and I started a record label specifically to release the Quiet Riot album "Down To The Bone". If the record would've been a hit, we had plans to sign other bands. And Kevin would produce them. Ultimately, I was lucky I broke even. The album sold about 20,000 copies. We recorded on an inexpensive budget. And one place where we were naive with the overall project's budget was with the cover art."

In relation to the album's artwork, Asnen noted "it was a great album cover.'" Sobol responded "Sure. But looking back, we spent way too much money on it. As far as the music, the style on the album was essentially Quiet Riot, but we chose to include a song written by another artist called "Pretty Pack 'O Lies". It was that grunge thing, kind of. Maybe Soundgarden. And not necessarily Nirvana, but taking on that "Lies" song, we were aware of those type bands. It was a good song, but I guess the time was passed for Quiet Riot, and only hardcore fans bought the album. There was a successful tour. But it was of smaller venues." Asnen noted "Well, personally, I loved the album when it came out. "Dig" and "Whatever It Takes" were great tracks. And it was always cool to see them performed live." Sobol replied "Those two songs were my favorites on the album! Kevin did a great job producing the album too. It was a great sounding record."

The album's artwork was inspired by the artwork of American progressive metal band Fates Warning's 1985 album The Spectre Within. Quiet Riot wanted a similar look for the Down to the Bone album. The focus of the artwork was to be the band's mascot character of previous albums. The artwork was later reproduced as posters, T-shirts, stickers, backstage passes, tour backdrops and sold as a limited edition print. The artwork's creator Ioannis, later sold the original artwork for $8000 circa 2008. He recalled "At first I kinda dragged my feet but then I really got into the technique and it turned into one of my favorite dark metal illustrations. We met at their hotel during one of their dates on tour and went over everything, both Frankie Bannali and Kevin Dubrow were great guys."

In the Billboard Magazine issue dated March 4, 1995, an article featuring a short interview with DuBrow stated that after MTV had made it clear that they didn't want to play clips of bands like Quiet Riot, the band reeled a remake of the Kinks' classic "All Day and All of the Night" for distribution via computer online services.

In a 2001 interview with DuBrow for Metal Sludge, DuBrow was asked to choose which album he preferred between Down to the Bone and the band's 1986 album QR III. DuBrow chose Down to the Bone and explained "A lot of people didn't really get "Down to the Bone" but I dug it. I thought it was really musical and adventurous. "QR III" was such an abomination because of the producer Spencer Proffer."

== Release ==
The album was released by Kamikaze Records on CD and cassette in America and Canada only. Like the band's previous 1993 album Terrified, the album was released on CD in Japan via Alfa Records, Inc. This was the only version of the album to feature two exclusive bonus tracks; "Slam Dunk" and "Love Can Change You". "Slam Dunk", written by DuBrow and Perris, was originally recorded in 1991 by Pretty Boy Floyd for the movie Switch. Additionally a newly recorded Quiet Riot version of "Slam Dunk" would later appear on the band's following 1999 studio album Alive and Well.

== Critical reception ==
Professional ratings
Review scores
Source	Rating
AllMusic	2/5 stars
The Deseret News	1/5 stars

Barry Weber of AllMusic stated "Although not quite as disappointing as the 1993 release Terrified, Down to the Bone once again fails to capture the listener's interest. While it has an acceptable remake of the Kinks classic "All Day and All of the Night" and a catchy acoustic title track, the albums still lacks composition and songwriting. Down to the Bone is only for the dedicated Quiet Riot fans who weren't already turned off by their past few releases."

The Deseret News called the album a "clunker" in the headline "3 albums show potential; 4th is a clunker". The reviewer Scott Iwasaki says "Guitarist Carlos Cavazo can do much better than the old Slade rehashes "Cum on Feel the Noize" and "Mama We're All Crazee Now." Both of which were virtual note for note duplicates of the originals without any real creative hooks. "Down to the Bone" is better than that – but that's not really saying much. Eddie Van Halen's pioneering pull-off licks (other bands use them so much they've become "rip-off" licks) are redundantly redone on this album. No excitement here – and that's a shame. The album's major problem is the timing. When other metal bands were picking out the neo-country rock blues, Quiet Riot held back. Now the album's title cut tries to tap into that tired sound. Then, trying to capitalize on the melodic metal of earlier hits, Quiet Riot rips itself off with "Twisted" and "Hell or High Water." Avoid this one."

== Track listing ==
All tracks are written by Frankie Banali, Carlos Cavazo and Kevin DuBrow except where noted.

No.	Title	Writer(s)	Length
1.	"Dig"		5:50
2.	"Pretty Pack o' Lies"	Ron Day	4:41
3.	"All Day and All of the Night" (The Kinks cover)	Ray Davies	3:16
4.	"Whatever It Takes"		6:25
5.	"Wings of a Cloud"		5:07
6.	"Trouble Again"	Banali; Cavazo; DuBrow; Bobby Rondinelli	5:57
7.	"Down to the Bone"		4:31
8.	"Voodoo Brew"		5:48
9.	"Monday Morning Breakdown"		6:00
10.	"Live Til It Hurts"	Banali; Steve Brandstetter; Cavazo; DuBrow	5:23
11.	"Twisted"		5:24
12.	"All Wound Up"	Banali; Cavazo; DuBrow; Bob Pavao	4:31
13.	"Hell or High Water"		4:30
14.	"Wings of a Cloud" (revisited)		1:26
15.	"Slam Dunk" (bonus track)		3:17
16.	"Love Can Change You" (bonus track)		3:58

== Personnel ==
=== Quiet Riot ===
- Kevin DuBrow – lead vocals
- Carlos Cavazo – guitars, backing vocals
- Frankie Banali – drums
- Chuck Wright – bass, backing vocals

=== Additional musicians ===
- Matt Littrell – bass on "Pretty Pack 'o Lies"
- Ron Day – backing vocals

=== Production ===
- Kevin DuBrow – producer
- Ron Sobol – executive producer
- Barry Connally – engineer
- Geoff Gibbs – engineer
- Chris Minto – engineer
- Eric S. Smith – assistant engineer
- Eric White – assistant engineer
- Ricky Delena – mixing
- Paul Tavenner – mastering
- Ioannis – art direction, cover art
- Stephen Jacaruso – design
- Diane Carter – public relations
- Jack Armstrong – booking agent
- Paige Lynn – retail coordinator
- Stephen Ashley – legal representative
- Dave Ivy – tour coordinator
