= '89 Live in Japan =

Video by Quiet Riot
- Released: November 16, 2004
- Recorded: 1989 in Japan
- Genre: Heavy metal, glam metal, hard rock
- Length: 50:00
- Label: MVD Visual Records

Quiet Riot chronology
Live in the 21st Century (2003)	'89 Live in Japan (2004)

'89 Live in Japan is a DVD released by American heavy metal band Quiet Riot on November 16, 2004.

== DVD track listing ==
1. Party All Night (DuBrow)
2. I'm Fallin' (Banali, Cavazo, Proffer, Shortino, Waldo)
3. Stay With Me Tonight (Banali, Cavazo, Proffer, Shortino)
4. Run To You (Banali, Cavazo, Shortino, Waldo)
5. The Wild and the Young (Banali, Cavazo, DuBrow, Proffer, Wright)
6. Joker (Banali, Cavazo, Kirksey, Proffer, Shortino)
7. Drum Solo (Banali)
8. Coppin' A Feel (Banali, Cavazo, Dean, Shortino)
9. King Of The Hill (Banali, Cavazo, Rabin, Shortino)
10. Cum On Feel The Noize (Holder, Lea) (Slade Cover)
11. Stay With Me

== Personnel ==
=== Quiet Riot ===
- Paul Shortino – lead vocals
- Carlos Cavazo – guitars
- Sean McNabb – bass
- Frankie Banali – drums

=== Additional musicians ===
- Jimmy Waldo – keyboards
