= In Trouble Again =

In Trouble Again may refer to:

- "In Trouble Again", the theme song from Star Wars: Droids
- Simon & Simon: In Trouble Again, a 1995 American film
- Trinity: In Trouble Again, or Crime Busters, a 1977 Italian film

== See also ==
- "Trouble Again", a song by Quiet Riot
