= The Randy Rhoads Years =

Compilation album by Quiet Riot
- Released: 1993
- Recorded: 1977–1978
- Genre: Hard rock
- Length: 43:25
- Label: Rhino
- Producers: Warren Entner, Lee DeCarlo, Kevin DuBrow, Derek Lawrence

Quiet Riot chronology
Terrified (1993)	The Randy Rhoads Years (1993)	Down to the Bone (1995)

Professional ratings
Review scores
Source	Rating
Allmusic	4/5 stars

The Randy Rhoads Years is a 1993 compilation album from American glam metal band Quiet Riot. It features previously unreleased and remixed material recorded with band founder Randy Rhoads in the 1970s.

== Changes and remixing ==
None of the songs on The Randy Rhoads Years are the same versions that appear on the original two Quiet Riot albums. Longtime Quiet Riot vocalist Kevin DuBrow remixed all the tracks at the request of the Rhoads family, with the exception of the previously unreleased "Force of Habit", as that track's master tape couldn't be located.

DuBrow also re-recorded his lead vocals on all tracks with the exception of "Force of Habit". The track "Last Call for Rock 'n' Roll" is a reworking of Rhoads' guitar parts from the track "Mama's Little Angels" on the 1978 album Quiet Riot. The drums on all tracks but "Force of Habit" were re-sampled, and the guitar tracks were played through Carlos Cavazo's Marshall amplifiers to duplicate the sound that Rhoads later achieved as a member of Ozzy Osbourne's band. According to DuBrow, Rhoads used Peavey amplifiers while in Quiet Riot and was never happy with his guitar tone, but was quite happy with his tone later with Osbourne as he had access to better equipment and was using Marshall amplifiers and cabinets.

The song "Trouble" was sped up as DuBrow felt the original was too slow. DuBrow also added wah-wah to one guitar solo, playing the pedal himself through the original guitar tracks. "Afterglow (Of Your Love)" from Quiet Riot II was stripped down and remixed, leaving just Rhoads' acoustic guitar in an "unplugged" arrangement. DuBrow used triangle samples to disguise background noise that could not be removed from the track. The sole live track, "Laughing Gas", featured an extended guitar solo that was spliced together from two separate recordings. It featured pieces of Rhoads' later songs "Goodbye to Romance", "Dee", and perhaps his best known song, the hit "Crazy Train". It also features parts of the "RR" solo outtake that was lost and found during the mixing for the 2011 Expanded Legacy Edition for Blizzard of Ozz and was put on the reissue as a bonus track.

== Track listing ==
No.	Title	Writer(s)	Length
1.	"Trouble" (Original version from Quiet Riot II)	Kevin DuBrow; Randy Rhoads	4:28
2.	"Laughing Gas" (Randy Rhoads Guitar Solo) (Live At The Great L.A. Club The Starwood July 6, 1977)	DuBrow; Rhoads	9:43
3.	"Afterglow (Of Your Love)" (Acoustic)	Ronnie Lane; Steve Marriott	3:22
4.	"Killer Girls" (Original version from Quiet Riot II)	DuBrow; Rhoads; Ron Sobol	4:18
5.	"Picking Up the Pieces" (Previously unreleased)	DuBrow; Rhoads	3:12
6.	"Last Call for Rock 'n' Roll" (Original version titled "Mama's Little Angels" from Quiet Riot)	DuBrow; Drew Forsyth; Kelly Garni; Rhoads	4:18
7.	"Breaking Up Is a Heartache" (Previously unreleased)	DuBrow; Rhoads	2:52
8.	"Force of Habit" (Previously unreleased)	DuBrow; Rhoads	3:10
9.	"It's Not So Funny" (Original version from Quiet Riot)	DuBrow; Rhoads	3:46
10.	"Look in Any Window" (Original version from Quiet Riot)	Rhoads	3:34

== Credits ==
=== Quiet Riot ===
- Kevin DuBrow - lead vocals, triangle, wah pedal overdub on "Trouble"
- Randy Rhoads - guitars
- Kelly Garni - bass
- Drew Forsyth - drums

=== Additional musicians ===
- Kenny Hillery - bass
- Carlos Cavazo - guitar overdubs

=== Production ===
- Kevin DuBrow - producer
- Lee DeCarlo - producer
- Warren Entner - producer
- Derek Lawrence - producer

== Sequel album and home video ==
At the time of release of The Randy Rhoads Years, DuBrow said in the 1993 interview with Guitar for the Practicing Musician that two more releases were forthcoming. He mentioned a second volume featuring more remixed and unreleased tracks, including Quiet Riot's version of "Quinn the Eskimo (The Mighty Quinn)". According to DuBrow, the release of any further tracks completely depended on their quality, and approval by the Rhoads family. He also said a home video release was forthcoming of an early Quiet Riot club show featuring Rhoads. This same video provided the audio for one half of the live version of "Laughing Gas" on The Randy Rhoads Years. To date, neither of these releases have seen the light of day; DuBrow had championed the release of the Rhoads material, and his 2007 death makes the release of any further Rhoads material unlikely.
