= Rehab (Quiet Riot album) =

Studio album by Quiet Riot
- Released: October 3, 2006
- Genres: Heavy metal, hard rock
- Length: 57:42
- Label: Chavis
- Producers: Kevin DuBrow, Frankie Banali

Quiet Riot chronology
Live & Rare Volume 1 (2005)	Rehab (2006)	Quiet Riot 10 (2014)

Professional ratings
Review scores
Source	Rating
AllMusic	3.5/5 stars

Rehab is the eleventh studio album released from the glam metal band Quiet Riot in 2006. It is their first studio release since 2001's Guilty Pleasures, and is their final studio album to feature lead singer Kevin DuBrow before his death in November 2007.

== Background ==
In September 2003, Quiet Riot broke up for the third time after the 'classic' lineup of vocalist Kevin DuBrow, guitarist Carlos Cavazo, bassist Rudy Sarzo and drummer Frankie Banali had been reunited since 1997. Interviews with individual members revealed there had been tensions within the band, particularly between DuBrow and Sarzo. When the band set out to reform in 2004, Neither Sarzo nor Cavazo was invited to re-join, and their roles in the band were instead filled by Chuck Wright, who had played with Quiet Riot various times in previous years, and Alex Grossi, respectively.

In December 2005, Frankie Banali issued an update on his official website stating:

As we wind down 2005 and begin to musically think about Quiet Riot in 2006, I want to thank all the friends and fans for the continued support that you have given to Quiet Riot. We have two shows left for this year, one in Salt Lake City, UT on November 29 and the final one on New Year's Eve in Ft Mohave, AZ. We will spend the month of December putting the finishing touches on the new material for the next Quiet Riot studio CD which we hope to commence recording in January for a 2006 release."

However, the band was once again faced by several line-up changes. Wright left the band in 2005, followed shortly afterwards by Grossi. In December 2005, guitarist Tracii Guns of L.A. Guns briefly joined the band, leaving less than a month later after one rehearsal due to musical differences. Over the following months, the band would also work with guitarist Billy Morris, former bassist Sean McNabb and bassist Wayne Carver. When asked about the status of the upcoming album and the reason it was taking time to be completed, Banali said:

"The new album is a work in progress. Kevin and I made a conscious decision last year to record new Quiet Riot music that would represent the style of music we both like. Since we are financing the project ourselves, we are in no hurry to churn it out because it is not time sensitive. Do we want it released? Of course, but when we are ready to do so and on our own terms. Let's face it, the Quiet Riot fans will likely go out and buy it when it is released. All those who aren't interested in Quiet Riot will ignore it. Then of course, the legions of malcontents who don't like Quiet Riot (or anything else, for that matter) will slam it as usual, without ever hearing it. So the album will be available when we decide to release it."

Finally, in late August 2006, it was announced that the new album, Rehab, would be released in October of that year.

== Musical style ==
The album is an intentional departure from the "party-rock" sound of their past material and offers a more mature sound. Shortly after its release, drummer Frankie Banali called Rehab "the best Quiet Riot material that [they] have released in nearly two decades". He was also very positive about guitarist Neil Citron and bassist Tony Franklin's performances on the album, stating "No other combination of musicians that Kevin and I have worked with in the past could have achieved what we achieved on "Rehab" due to the variety of the material and styles."

Kevin DuBrow commented on the difference in sound compared to the material that the band is most known for, and compared the album to 1970s rock music, particularly the bands that the members of Quiet Riot grew up listening to, saying:

"If you are expecting Metal Health Part II, you won't get it and you won't like it. There are hardly any background vocals, I mean, it's very similar to a '70s record in that way... it's very retro. It's not super dry, but it's not super wet in the echo either. It's like the records I grew up listening to, Humble Pie, Led Zeppelin, Spooky Tooth, Free, bands from the '70s, retro bands. Our original roots were more towards glam, [David] Bowie, Sweet, Slade, things like that."

== Recording and guest performers ==
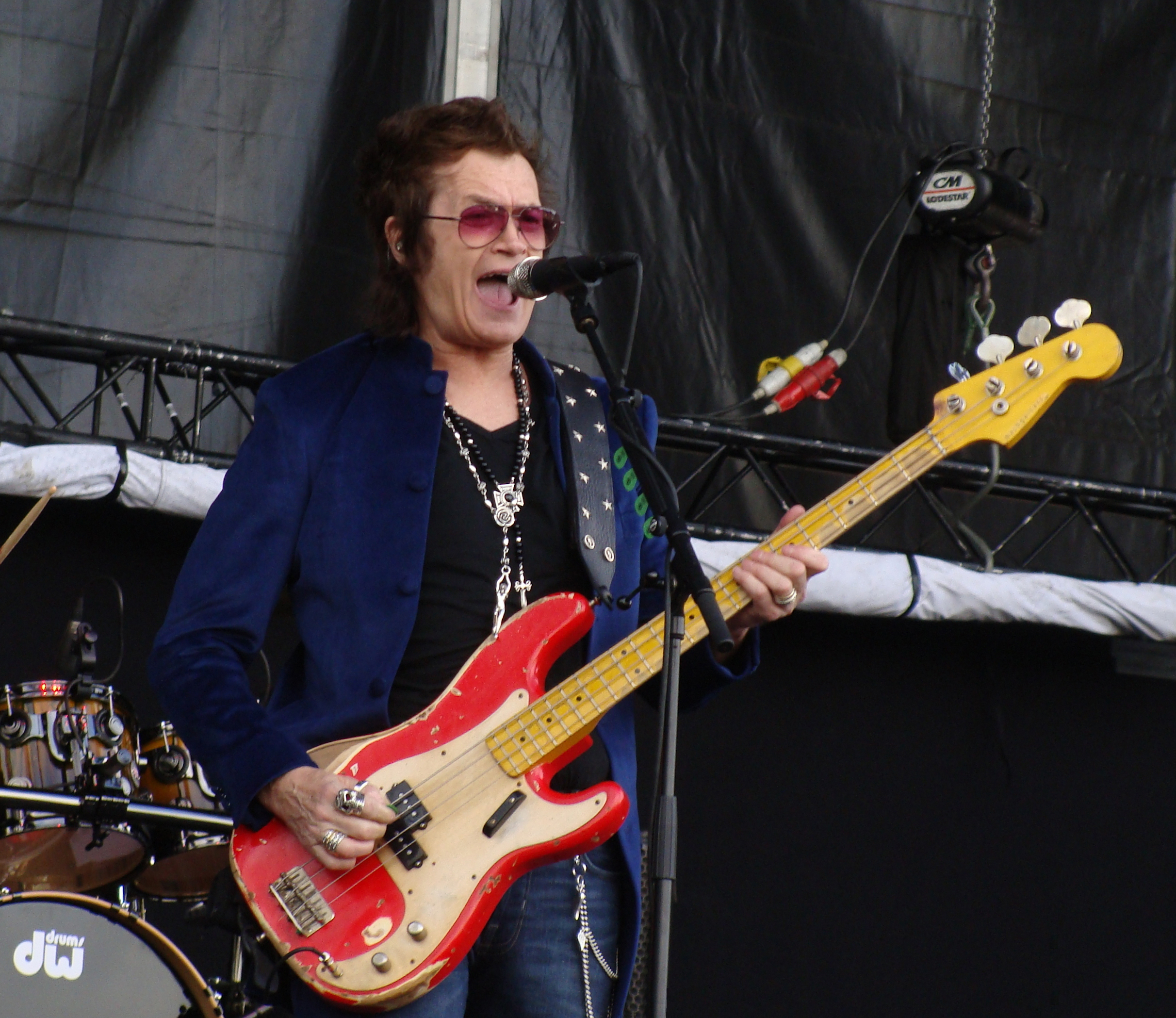
Glenn Hughes made a guest appearance on the Crow cover "Evil Woman" contributing both vocals and bass, and also assisted in the album's songwriting.

For the recording of the album, Neil Citron played guitar (with the exception of "Free" and "Strange Daze"), while Tony Franklin performed bass. However, for the tour in support of this album, former members Alex Grossi (guitar) and Chuck Wright (bass) returned to the band.

The album also features a guest bass and vocal appearance by Glenn Hughes of Deep Purple and Black Sabbath fame, performing on the Spooky Tooth cover "Evil Woman". Hughes also heavily contributed to the album's songwriting. Kevin said of Hughes' contribution "[his biggest contribution] was actually more the songwriting and the background vocals to the other songs. Because he was a big participant on the songs that Frankie Banali had written with Neil, that I couldn't complete, because they were so far out of my normal vocabulary. Glenn came over to my house, just on the computer and just boom, finished all the songs I was having trouble with."

== Critical reception ==
The album has received positive reviews from critics. Prato of Allmusic gave Rehab three and a half stars out of five, and cited the first song "Free" as proving that "DuBrow's voice still sounds identical to the group's Metal Health days" and described "South Of Heaven" as having "an unmistakable [Led] Zeppelin-esque flair". He ended his review by concluding that "From front to back, all the trademark Quiet Riot elements remain in place on Rehab."

Greg Schmitt of Rock Eyez Webzine also reviewed the album positively with three and a half stars out of five, particularly praising the band's change in direction, saying "The problem was, with each [studio album] release getting further and further away from 1983; the material seemed to become more and more dated... It's almost ironic that for the band to seem fresh again, they needed to go truly retro. And that's just what they've done on Rehab." He concluded his review by saying, "by delving back into their roots, the band has found new vitality and spirit we haven't seen in years. Rehab still has plenty of '80s a metal sensibility, but marriages it well with the soulful grooves of the '70s. For Quiet Riot to be relevant in 2006, Rehab might just well be what the doctor ordered."

== Track listing ==
No.	Title	Writer(s)	Length
1.	"Free"	Kevin DuBrow/Alex Grossi	4:06
2.	"Blind Faith"	Frankie Banali/Neil Citron/DuBrow/Glenn Hughes	3:25
3.	"South of Heaven"	DuBrow/Michael Lardie	5:44
4.	"Black Reign"	DuBrow	4:50
5.	"Old Habits Die Hard"	Banali/Citron/DuBrow/Hughes	6:17
6.	"Strange Daze"	DuBrow/Grossi	4:17
7.	"In Harms Way"	Banali/Citron/DuBrow/Hughes	4:37
8.	"Beggars and Thieves"	DuBrow/Lardie	6:38
9.	"Don't Think"	Banali/Citron/DuBrow	4:58
10.	"It Sucks to Be You"	DuBrow	4:01
11.	"Evil Woman" (Spooky Tooth cover)	Larry Weiss	8:50
12.	"The Truth" (hidden track)		3:41

- Japanese edition

No.	Title	Length
12.	"Wired to the Moon"

== Credits ==
Quiet Riot

- Kevin DuBrow – lead vocals
- Neil Citron – guitars
- Tony Franklin – bass
- Frankie Banali – drums

Additional musicians

- Glenn Hughes – bass & vocals on "Evil Woman"
- Alex Grossi – guitar on "Free" & "Strange Daze"

Production

- Kevin DuBrow – producer
- Frankie Banali – producer
- Neil Citron – recording, mixing & mastering engineer
- Greg Wurth – assistant engineer
