= Laughing Gas (instrumental) =

"Laughing Gas" was a song performed by Quiet Riot at all the live performances while Randy Rhoads played with the band. It was never recorded onto an album until a live bootleg performance was enhanced (with rerecorded vocals) and placed on The Randy Rhoads Years. The improvised solo was just over 6 minutes long and contained clips from future songs of Ozzy Osbourne including, "Goodbye to Romance", "Mr. Crowley", "Dee", and "Crazy Train". The solo outlined Randy's talent and productivity level at such a young age. This solo also contained a reference to William Tell Overture and this certainly got the crowd roaring.

When Rhoads left the band, this song was never again performed.

== With Ozzy ==
This solo was regularly performed, in different incarnations, with Ozzy on tour. It usually came near the end of "Suicide Solution", although Randy had to cut back the solo to just 2 minutes. One such incarnation of the solo appears on the Tribute album. The solo on the live album was from a different show (Montreal) than the rest of the album (Cleveland), and was haphazardly spliced in over the original for unknown reasons.
