= John Torra =

- Torra in 2026, upon becoming the lead singer of Quiet Riot.

Background information
- Born: February 12, 2003 (age 23); Massapequa, New York, US.
- Genres: Hard rock, heavy metal, glam metal
- Instruments: Vocals, guitar
- Years active: 2023–present
- Member of: Quiet Riot
- Formerly of: Conquer At Will, Fire ‘N Ice

John Maturo (born February 12, 2003), known professionally as John Torra, is an American rock singer and guitarist. He is the lead vocalist of the heavy metal band Quiet Riot.

== Music career ==
Torra began his musical career in 2023 as the rhythm guitarist for Mahopac, New York heavy metal band Conquer At Will. Torra later joined New Jersey hair metal band Fire ‘N Ice as its vocalist and guitarist.

Torra subsequently began attending Rock 'n Roll Fantasy Camp, where he performed alongside and developed relationships with a number of established rock musicians.

Following the departure of Quiet Riot vocalist Jizzy Pearl in July 2026 and the band's subsequent announcement of open auditions for a new lead vocalist, Torra began posting videos on social media of himself performing Quiet Riot songs.

The videos attracted significant attention online, with some fans and professional musicians expressing support for Torra as a potential replacement for Pearl, citing similarities between his vocal style and that of original Quiet Riot vocalist Kevin DuBrow.

During the open audition process, departing vocalist Pearl publicly alleged Torra's audition videos had likely been enhanced using artificial intelligence (AI). Pearl later retracted the allegation and issued an apology.

On September 21, 2026, Quiet Riot announced Torra, then 23-years-old, had been selected as the band's new lead vocalist. Band manager Regina Banali stated the band had received numerous comments, tags, and messages from fans advocating for Torra, but said his selection was ultimately based on his audition and vocal performance. Banali described Torra as having an "authentic sound" that brought the band's material "to life the way it’s meant to be heard."
