= Guilty Pleasures (Quiet Riot album) =

Studio album by Quiet Riot
- Released: May 29, 2001
- Genre: Heavy metal
- Length: 50:41
- Label: Bodyguard
- Producers: John Rollo, Quiet Riot

Quiet Riot chronology
Alive and Well (1999)	Guilty Pleasures (2001)	Live & Rare Volume 1 (2005)

Professional ratings
Review scores
Source	Rating
Allmusic	3.5/5 stars

Guilty Pleasures is the tenth studio album by the glam metal band Quiet Riot released in 2001. It was produced jointly by John Rollo and Quiet Riot. It is the last to feature longtime guitarist Carlos Cavazo and bassist Rudy Sarzo, though Sarzo later appeared as a guest performer on the band's 2014 studio album Quiet Riot 10 and he eventually rejoined the band in 2021.

== Track listing ==
All tracks are written by Frankie Banali, Carlos Cavazo, Kevin DuBrow and Rudy Sarzo.

No.	Title	Length
1.	"Vicious Circle"	5:28
2.	"Feel the Pain"	5:00
3.	"Rock the House"	4:46
4.	"Shadow of Love"	4:18
5.	"I Can't Make You Love Me"	5:20
6.	"Feed the Machine"	4:04
7.	"Guilty Pleasures"	4:09
8.	"Blast from the Past"	3:38
9.	"Let Me Be the One"	5:43
10.	"Street Fighter"	3:22
11.	"Fly Too High"	4:52

== Credits ==
=== Quiet Riot ===
- Kevin DuBrow - lead vocals
- Carlos Cavazo - guitars
- Rudy Sarzo - bass
- Frankie Banali - drums
