= Metal Health (song) =

1983 single by Quiet Riot

- Cover of the 1983 US single

Single by Quiet Riot

from the album Metal Health
- Released: November 1983
- Recorded: 1982
- Genre: Heavy metal; glam metal
- Length: 5:17 (album version); 4:16 (single version)
- Label: Pasha
- Songwriters: Carlos Cavazo; Kevin DuBrow; Frankie Banali; Tony Cavazo
- Producer: Spencer Proffer

Quiet Riot singles chronology
"Cum on Feel the Noize" (1983)	"Metal Health" (1983)	"Mama Weer All Crazee Now" (1984)

Music video
- "Metal Health" on YouTube

"Metal Health", sometimes listed as "Metal Health (Bang Your Head)", "Bang Your Head" or, as it was listed on the Billboard Hot 100, "Bang Your Head (Metal Health)", is a song by the American heavy metal band Quiet Riot on their breakthrough album, Metal Health. One of their best known hits and receiving heavy MTV music video and radio play, "Metal Health" was the band's second and final top 40 hit, peaking at #31 on the Billboard Hot 100.

Being about the headbanging phenomenon within the heavy metal subculture, the song caught the attention of many heavy metal fans on its release. The single contained both the studio-recorded version and a live version, which was later released on their Greatest Hits compilation. The lyric, "well now you're here, there's no way back", eventually became the title for Quiet Riot's documentary, released in 2015.

The main riff/structure of the song come from an older track entitled "No More Booze", which was originally performed by Snow, Carlos Cavazo and Tony Cavazo's pre-Quiet Riot band. A live version of this song can be heard on the At Last recordings, which finally received a release in 2017.

== Music video ==
Produced for $19,000 and employing students as extras, the music video was filmed in the Walt Disney Modular Theater and hallways of the California Institute of the Arts. It features the masked man on the album cover breaking out of the asylum he is confined in. After taking off his mask, the man is revealed to be Kevin DuBrow who then joins the band and plays the remainder of the song.

== Personnel ==
=== Quiet Riot ===
- Kevin DuBrow – lead vocals
- Carlos Cavazo – guitars, backing vocals
- Rudy Sarzo – bass, backing vocals
- Frankie Banali – drums, backing vocals

=== Additional personnel ===
- Chuck Wright – bass

== Charts ==
Chart (1983–1984)	Peak position
Australian Singles (Kent Music Report)	84
Canada Top Singles (RPM)	48
UK Singles (Official Charts) with "Cum on Feel the Noize"	45
US Billboard Hot 100	31
US Mainstream Rock (Billboard)	37

== Accolades ==
Publication	Country	Accolade	Rank
Rolling Stone	US	20 Greatest Two-Hit Wonders of All Time	5
PopMatters	US	36 Essential '80s Pop Metal Tracks	17
Loudwire	US	The 11 Heaviest Hair Metal Songs	1
LouderSound	US	The 20 Best Hair Metal Anthems Of All Time Ever	3
VH1	US	Top 40 Metal Songs	35

== Uses in popular culture ==
The song was heard in the movie Babylon A.D. (2008), as well as the movie Footloose (1984) and its 2011 remake. It was also used in the opening credits of the movies Crank (2006) and The Wrestler (2008), and in a television commercial for Hyundai first shown during CBS's coverage of Super Bowl XLVII on February 3, 2013.

"Weird Al" Yankovic performed the song as part of his polka medley "Hooked on Polkas" from his album Dare to Be Stupid (1985).

The song was featured in the professional wrestling video game Showdown: Legends of Wrestling (2004).

The song was featured in the video game Grand Theft Auto: Vice City Stories (2006) on the fictional in-game radio station "V-Rock".

The song was featured in the rhythm games Guitar Hero Encore: Rocks the 80s (2007) and Rock Band Blitz (2012).
