= Road Rage (Quiet Riot album) =

Studio album by Quiet Riot
- Released: August 4, 2017
- Genre: Heavy metal
- Length: 49:06
- Label: Frontiers

Quiet Riot chronology
Quiet Riot 10 (2014)	Road Rage (2017)	Hollywood Cowboys (2019)

Road Rage is the thirteenth studio album from the glam metal band Quiet Riot. This is the first album to feature American Idol alum James Durbin on lead vocals. The album was originally recorded with vocalist Seann Nicols, a former member of Adler's Appetite and Icon, and scheduled for release on April 21, 2017. Pre-orders for the album began on March 1, 2017, and the instant gratification track was titled "The Seeker" (with Nicols). However, Nicols was fired from the band in March, and it was subsequently announced that the album would be postponed so that Nicols' vocals and lyrics could be replaced and re-recorded by Durbin. The track "The Seeker" was withdrawn from distribution at this point, and never saw release on the final version of Road Rage in any form. The album finally saw release on August 4, 2017. Billboard Magazine debuted the music video for the single "Can't Get Enough" directed by Regina Russell Banali on July 24, 2017.

== Track listing ==
Studio
No.	Title	Length
1.	"Can't Get Enough"	4:00
2.	"Getaway"	4:53
3.	"Roll This Joint"	4:30
4.	"Freak Flag"	4:01
5.	"Wasted"	4:45
6.	"Still Wild"	4:45
7.	"Make a Way"	4:30
8.	"Renegades"	5:37
9.	"The Road"	3:51
10.	"Shame"	3:51
11.	"Knock Em Down"	4:23

Japanese bonus track
No.	Title	Length
12.	"Make a Way (acoustic)"

== Personnel ==
Quiet Riot

- James Durbin – vocals
- Alex Grossi – guitars
- Chuck Wright – bass
- Frankie Banali – drums

== Charts ==
Chart (2017)	Peak position
US Independent Albums (Billboard)	23
