= Quiet Riot =

American heavy metal band

- The current lineup of Quiet Riot: (clockwise from top left) Rudy Sarzo (bass), Alex Grossi (guitar), John Torra (vocals) and Johnny Kelly (drums).

Background information
- Also known as: Mach 1 (1973); Little Women (1973–1975); Quite Right (1975)
- Origin: Los Angeles, California, U.S.
- Genres: Heavy metal; hard rock; glam metal; glam rock (early)
- Years active: 1973–1980; 1982–1989; 1991–2003; 2004–2007; 2010–present
- Labels: Pasha; CBS Sony; Atlantic; Chavis; Frontiers
- Members: Rudy Sarzo; Alex Grossi; Johnny Kelly; John Torra
- Past members: List of Quiet Riot members
- Website: officialquietriot.com

Quiet Riot is an American heavy metal band formed in Los Angeles in 1973 by guitarist Randy Rhoads, bassist Kelly Garni, and vocalist Kevin DuBrow.

The original lineup featured Rhoads and Garni with lead vocalist Kevin DuBrow and drummer Drew Forsyth, though that version of the band was mired in turmoil that would eventually result in Garni being fired for making death threats against DuBrow. Their most commercially successful lineup consisted of DuBrow alongside guitarist Carlos Cavazo, bassist Rudy Sarzo and drummer Frankie Banali, and in 1983 released their breakthrough album Metal Health, which is known for being the first heavy metal album to top the Billboard album chart. The band had several hit singles that charted on the Billboard Hot 100, including "Cum On Feel the Noize" (a cover song of the glam rock band Slade), and "Metal Health (Bang Your Head)". The band is ranked at No. 100 on VH1's 100 Greatest Artists of Hard Rock.

Despite several lineup changes and brief breakups, Quiet Riot continued to record and tour until DuBrow's death from a cocaine overdose in 2007. Although there are no original members left in the band, Banali (who had been a member on and off since 1982) reformed Quiet Riot in 2010, and by 2020, it had consisted of himself on drums, lead vocalist Jizzy Pearl, longtime bassist Chuck Wright and guitarist Alex Grossi. The band has continued to record and tour following DuBrow's death. In 2014, they released their first album in eight years, titled Quiet Riot 10, which was followed by Road Rage in 2017 and Hollywood Cowboys in 2019. Banali died in August 2020 following a sixteen-month battle with pancreatic cancer. About three weeks after his death, the surviving members of the band announced that they would continue Quiet Riot in accordance with Banali's wishes; he was replaced by Johnny Kelly. In August 2021, Quiet Riot released a statement saying that Sarzo would rejoin the band, while announcing the departure of Wright. The new lineup made plans to release new music and tour throughout 2022 and 2023.

In 2020, Jeff Mezydlo of Yardbarker included them in his list of "the 20 greatest hair metal bands of all time", placing them seventh.

== History ==
=== Early career, first two albums and first breakup (1973–1981) ===
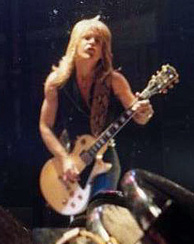
Guitarist Randy Rhoads, who founded Quiet Riot in 1973

Formed in 1973 by guitarist Randy Rhoads and bassist Kelly Garni, Quiet Riot became one of the more successful hard rock acts in Los Angeles in the mid-to-late 1970s. Originally known as Mach 1, the name was soon changed to Little Women before the name Quiet Riot was finally settled upon in May 1975. The band's name was inspired by a quote from Rick Parfitt of the British band Status Quo. Parfitt stated that he thought the name "Quite Right" would make a good band name, and DuBrow amended this to "Quiet Riot".

Drew Forsyth, who had previously played with Rhoads and Garni in a band called Mildred Pierce, was hired as the new group's drummer, and a Los Angeles photographer named Kevin DuBrow was hired as lead vocalist. DuBrow was not at all what Rhoads had in mind for his new band, and he was not well-liked by his Quiet Riot bandmates, a situation that caused a great deal of tension within the band. Rhoads had envisioned a frontman in the vein of Alice Cooper or David Bowie, but DuBrow was persistent and would not take no for an answer. In the end, Rhoads and Garni decided that if nothing else, DuBrow shared their enthusiasm and he was hired.

Rhoads became the focal point of the band, both musically and visually. The "polka-dot theme" he incorporated onstage became Quiet Riot's visual signature during their time on the L.A. club circuit, with many fans showing up at the band's shows wearing polka-dot bow-ties and vests in emulation of what the guitarist wore on stage. Musically, Rhoads' talent as a lead guitarist began to spread by word of mouth, and hard rock fans from across Los Angeles began frequenting the band's gigs to hear what the fuss was about.

In the 1970s, Quiet Riot developed a friendly but intense rivalry with Van Halen before either act had signed a record deal. While Van Halen signed to Warner Bros. in 1977 and released a debut album that would achieve Gold certification, Quiet Riot's contract with Sony would see their first two albums released only in Japan, albums that to this day have never been released in the US. The band recorded their debut album Quiet Riot, or QR I, in 1977.

Coupled with their inability to secure an American recording deal, tensions between vocalist DuBrow and bassist Garni began to tear the band apart. According to Garni, "I was on a constant quest to get him out of the band and get a different singer. I hated him, he hated me and we could not find any way whatsoever to get along which caused a lot of tension in the band and it put a lot of stress on Randy to try to be neutral." Their second album Quiet Riot II, or QR II, was recorded at The Record Plant and released in Japan in 1978.

As Quiet Riot II was being recorded, the relationship between Garni and DuBrow finally reached its breaking point. After robbing a bar the previous night and stealing liquor, a drunken Garni unsuccessfully attempted to convince Rhoads to replace the vocalist. Garni drunkenly fired a handgun through the ceiling and a fistfight between him and Rhoads ensued. Garni then hatched a plan to drive across town to the Record Plant and kill DuBrow, who was there recording vocals for Quiet Riot II. Garni was arrested for drunk driving before he reached the studio, and the plan to kill his bandmate waned after he sobered up. Nonetheless, Garni's time in Quiet Riot came to a swift end. Future Mötley Crüe founder Nikki Sixx auditioned to replace Garni, but Sixx "didn't know the names of the notes and couldn't play the instrument" at that point, according to DuBrow. Rudy Sarzo, an acquaintance of DuBrow's, was hired and was pictured and credited on the album QR II, though it was actually Garni who performed on the album. Though he downplayed the inner conflict within the band, DuBrow would confess years later that this period of the band's existence had been extremely frustrating: "We had one of the best guitar players ever in our band and we couldn't get arrested!"

By 1979, Rhoads began to tire of the turmoil within Quiet Riot as well as their failure to sign a US recording deal. Late that year he auditioned for Ozzy Osbourne's band upon the urging of future Slaughter bassist Dana Strum. Osbourne said he was immediately blown away by the guitarist's talent and hired him immediately. Shortly thereafter, bassist Rudy Sarzo followed Rhoads to Osbourne's band and Quiet Riot's future seemed very much in doubt. As Quiet Riot was expected to disband at this point, Rhoads incorporated many riffs and fragments of early Quiet Riot material into the new material he was working on with Osbourne. According to Sarzo "a lot of the Quiet Riot songs ended up on the [Osbourne] albums under different titles. Obviously Randy thought we'd never use those songs again so he'd give the riffs to Ozzy who'd come up with new words." For example, the main riff of the Osbourne song "Suicide Solution" originated as a secondary riff during the verse of a Quiet Riot demo recording entitled "Force of Habit".

According to DuBrow, Rhoads' departure from Quiet Riot in 1979 appeared to be the end of the line, saying that the loss "didn't derail the band, it ended it." He and Forsyth attempted to carry on under the Quiet Riot name for a short time with the addition of guitarist Greg Leon before the band officially broke up in 1980. Leon was very succinct when asked why his time in Quiet Riot was so brief, saying "Kevin DuBrow was impossible to work with." Following the demise of Quiet Riot, Dubrow recruited former Gamma drummer Skip Gillette and played shows in the L.A club circuit for approximately two years under the band name DuBrow.

In September 2023, Ratt frontman Stephen Pearcy told AXS TV that only a small number of bands had "really kickstarted things" on the Sunset Strip, naming Quiet Riot, Mötley Crüe, Roxx Regime (later Stryper), Dante Fox (later Great White), W.A.S.P., and Ratt as the core group.

=== Rebirth and Metal Health success (1982–1984) ===
In early 1982, having recruited drummer Frankie Banali, bassist Chuck Wright, and guitarist Carlos Cavazo, DuBrow contacted Rhoads to ask if he had any objections to him reviving the name Quiet Riot for his new band. Rhoads gave him his blessing but said he wanted to check with Rudy Sarzo first. Sarzo had no objections, and Quiet Riot was thus reborn after a two-year hiatus. Rhoads died in a plane crash while on tour with Osbourne in March 1982, and Sarzo subsequently left Osbourne's band a few months later, having a difficult time coping with the grief of losing his close friend and bandmate. The reformed Quiet Riot was recording a new song called "Thunderbird" as a tribute to Rhoads, and DuBrow called Sarzo to ask if he'd like to participate in the recording. The lineup of DuBrow, Sarzo, Cavazo, and Banali had so much fun recording the track that they wound up recording more than half of the new album in the process. Bassist Wright had already been briefly replaced by Gary Van Dyke (Hollywood Stars, Virgin), but the arrangement was not working out and Sarzo was subsequently welcomed back to Quiet Riot as a full time member. Coming so soon after Rhoads' death, there was some question over the appropriateness of the new band using the Quiet Riot name. Rhoads' mother Delores encouraged the band, and in the end it was decided that "although Randy wouldn't be in it, the original spirit of the band was back," according to Sarzo.

In September 1982, with help from producer Spencer Proffer, Quiet Riot finally signed a US recording contract with CBS Records and the album Metal Health was released on March 11, 1983. The group's landmark single "Cum On Feel the Noize" was released on August 27, 1983. A cover of a 1973 song by Slade, the single spent two weeks at No. 5 on the Billboard Hot 100 chart in November 1983 and made history as the first heavy metal song to ever crack the Hot 100. The success of the single was instrumental in ushering in a new era of unparalleled success for heavy metal music in the 1980s and helped carry the album Metal Health to the top of Billboard album chart, making it the first American heavy metal debut album to reach No. 1 in the United States. By October 1 it became the highest-charting heavy metal debut of all-time, beating out Def Leppard (On Through the Night, #51, 1980), Van Halen (Van Halen, #19,1978) and Led Zeppelin (Led Zeppelin, #10, 1969). On November 26, 1983, Quiet Riot became the first heavy metal band to have a top 5 hit and No. 1 album in the same week. Their success was aided in no small part by the "Cum On Feel the Noize" video's heavy rotation on MTV. Exposure in the popular film Footloose helped spark airplay of the title track. Metal Health displaced The Police's Synchronicity at No. 1 and stayed there for just a week until Lionel Richie's Can't Slow Down took over the No. 1 spot.

Metal Health's title track charted in early 1984 and peaked at No. 31. The song was placed at No. 41 on VH1's Top 100 Greatest Hard Rock Songs. The album Metal Health would ultimately sell over six million copies in the US.

In support of Metal Health, Quiet Riot toured North America as the opening act for ZZ Top on their Eliminator Tour for selected dates in June, July and September 1983, Iron Maiden on their World Piece Tour and Black Sabbath on their Born Again tour from October 1983 through March 1984. Circus Year in Rock 1983 reported that the band opened for Judas Priest in December 1983.

=== Steady decline and DuBrow's firing (1984–1989) ===
The group's follow-up, Condition Critical, was released on July 27, 1984. Though successful in its own right, it failed to match the critical and commercial success of its predecessor, selling 1 million units and reaching only No. 15 on the Billboard album chart. This release included another Slade cover "Mama Weer All Crazee Now", which was released as a single alongside a video that was played in heavy rotation on MTV. Frustrated over the album's failure to duplicate the success of its predecessor, DuBrow began expressing his opinion in the heavy metal press that many bands in the Los Angeles metal scene owed their success to what he saw as the doors opened for them by Quiet Riot. At one point, he even compared his band to the Beatles. DuBrow's verbal assaults angered many of Quiet Riot's musical contemporaries and alienated fans.

DuBrow's tirades led to fan backlash and clashes in the media with several other Los Angeles-based metal bands, which resulted in Rudy Sarzo quitting the group in March 1985. After auditions, Kjel Benner was brought in to complete previously booked South American tour dates in April 1985. Despite any lingering hard feelings between DuBrow and Sarzo, the bassist briefly rejoined his former bandmates in May 1985 for the Hear 'n Aid sessions, a charity project headed by Ronnie James Dio to raise money for African famine relief. Sarzo resurfaced with former Ozzy Osbourne bandmate Tommy Aldridge two years later in Whitesnake, touring in support of the band's hugely successful self-titled 1987 album. Sarzo was permanently replaced in Quiet Riot by a reinstated Chuck Wright, after five years' absence from the band. and the group temporarily added keyboardist John Purdell for their 1986 tour. That year, the album QR III was released to further commercial decline.

Fed up with DuBrow's antics and pressure from the band's management and record label, the rest of Quiet Riot fired DuBrow from his own band in February 1987 and replaced him with former Rough Cutt vocalist Paul Shortino, leaving no original members in the band. Chuck Wright left the band shortly thereafter, and Sarzo was invited to return. Sarzo agreed, and while technically back in the band and even featured in some press photos for this brief liaison, he was also committed to Whitesnake at the time and could not continue onward. The group then recruited Sean McNabb for the bassist slot. The revamped band released their second self-titled album, Quiet Riot (also known as QR IV), in October 1988. The album failed to return the band to its commercial glory. In April 1989, the band members went their separate ways. A show from their final tour was shot in Japan and was archived by Frankie Banali who retained the copyright of the video production master through his Red Samurai Music Production Company and later collaborated with Jack Edward Sawyers in 2004 to create a DVD released for the titled '89 Live in Japan. Frankie Banali resurfaced on the W.A.S.P. album The Headless Children, and played some shows with Faster Pussycat. Sean McNabb joined House of Lords in 1991, where he replaced Chuck Wright, the bass player whom he had also replaced in Quiet Riot. Kevin DuBrow subsequently fought in court to keep control of the band's name.

=== Reformation and Metal Health lineup reunion (1990–2003) ===
Having won the rights to the band's name, DuBrow teamed up with 21-year-old English born blues guitarist Sean Manning, bassist Kenny Hillery, and drummer Pat Ashby to reform Quiet Riot. Initially using the moniker Little Women (a name Rhoads and DuBrow used in the 1970s before settling on Quiet Riot) on tour to avoid any adverse publicity, DuBrow and Manning compiled songs for a new album, which would eventually turn up on the July 1993 release Terrified. The band played venues throughout the United States until 1990 when Manning left to join the band Hurricane.

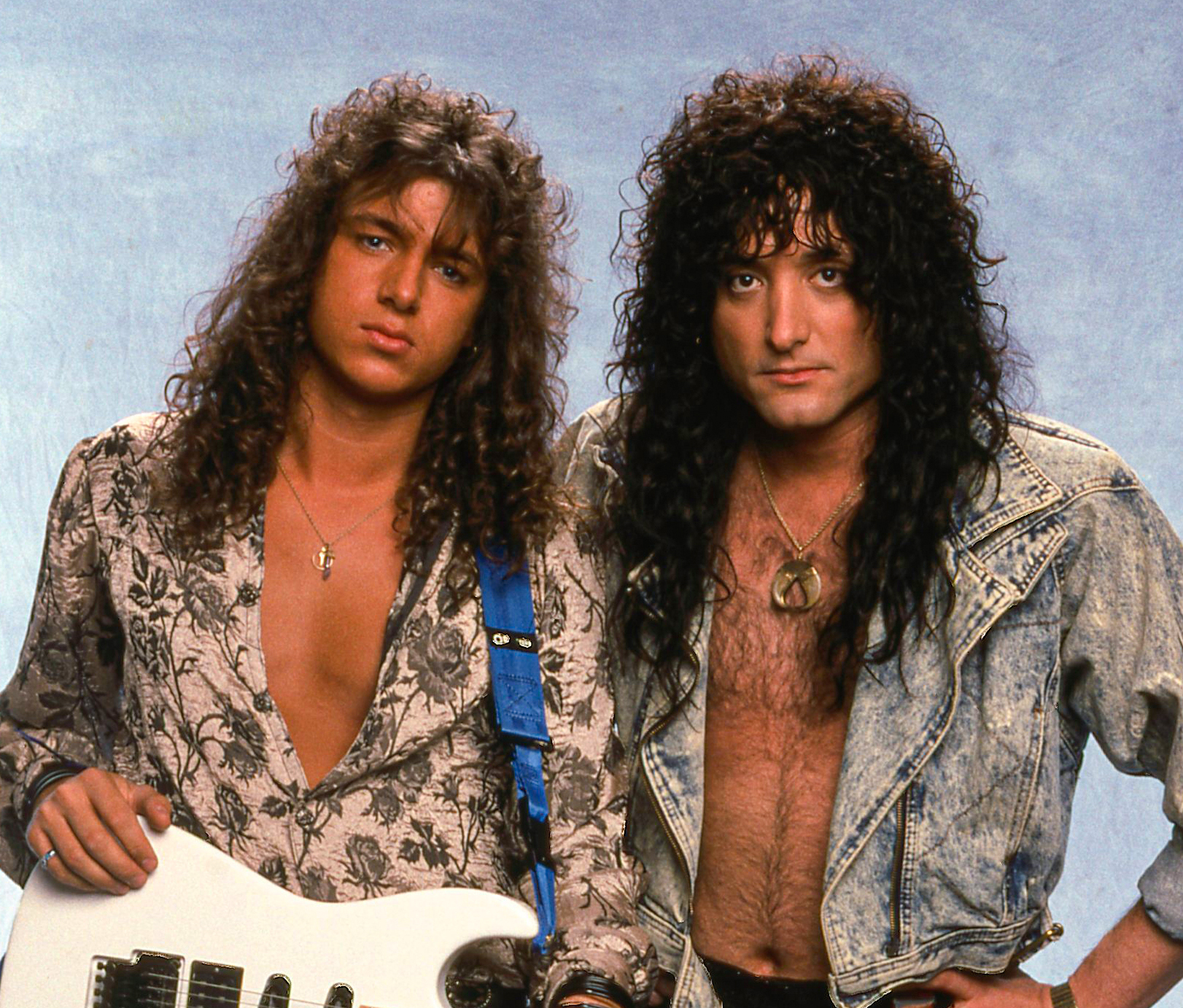
Sean Manning and Kevin DuBrow

By the early 1990s tempers had cooled between former bandmates Carlos Cavazo and Kevin DuBrow, and they started to communicate again. They eventually formed the band Heat in 1991 with bassist Kenny Hillery and drummer Bobby Rondinelli. This foursome reverted to the name Quiet Riot the following year, and released the aforementioned Terrified in 1993 with Banali rejoining on drums after Bobby Rondinelli joined Black Sabbath. Chuck Wright then rejoined on bass for a 1994 tour in support of Terrified.

That same year, DuBrow released The Randy Rhoads Years, a compilation featuring remixed tracks from Quiet Riot's two Japan-only releases along with previously unreleased material, many of which featured newly recorded vocals. The band released the album Down to the Bone in March 1995 and a Greatest Hits album in February 1996. Greatest Hits covered only material from the CBS years, including three tracks from the 1988 album with Shortino and two previously promo-only live tracks. Former bassist Kenny Hillery, who had left the group in 1994, committed suicide on June 5, 1996.

Rudy Sarzo rejoined the band again in January 1997, reuniting the Metal Health lineup. During a tour that year, one angry fan sued DuBrow for injuries she claimed were sustained during a show. In March 1999 the band released the album Alive and Well, which featured new songs and several re-recorded hits. The same lineup released the album Guilty Pleasures in May 2001. In August 2002, former vocalist Shortino filled in for DuBrow for three concerts when DuBrow became ill with the flu.

In September 2002, the band teamed up with director Jack Edward Sawyers to shoot a concert video at the Key Club in Los Angeles. The live DVD, Live in the 21st Century, was released November 11, 2003. Quiet Riot officially broke up again in September 2003.

=== Second reformation and death of DuBrow (2004–2007) ===
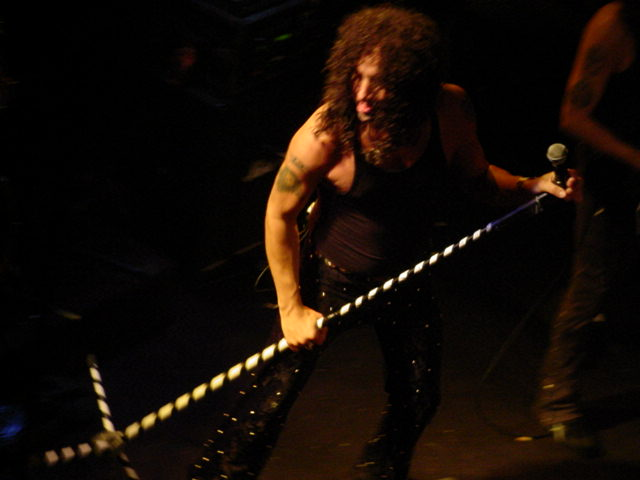
DuBrow performing

Kevin DuBrow released his first solo album, In for the Kill, in May 2004, which was followed by the announcement of a Quiet Riot reunion in October 2004. This reunion lineup included Kevin DuBrow, Frankie Banali, Chuck Wright, and new guitarist Alex Grossi. The band was featured on the 2005 Rock Never Stops Tour along with Cinderella, Ratt, and FireHouse. In December 2005, guitarist Tracii Guns of L.A. Guns briefly joined Quiet Riot. Guns left less than a month later after one rehearsal due to musical differences.

During 2006, Quiet Riot worked on a new studio album that was expected to be released in either 2006 or 2007. The band stated that they had set no timetable for the release of the album, that they were financing the project themselves, and that it would be released when they saw fit and on their terms. Ex-The Firm and Blue Murder bassist Tony Franklin worked with the band in the studio. Quiet Riot released the album Rehab, featuring a lineup of DuBrow, Banali, Franklin, and Neil Citron, on October 3, 2006. Former Deep Purple bassist and singer Glenn Hughes made a guest vocal appearance on the album. Dubrow, Banali, Wright and Grossi toured in support of the album. In 2007, Quiet Riot were featured in radio promos for ESPN Radio, parodying their status as outdated rock n' roll icons, with commentary from DuBrow and Banali.

On November 25, 2007, Kevin DuBrow was found dead in his Las Vegas apartment. Frankie Banali confirmed the death in an e-mail to Spain's The Metal Circus. Banali wrote:

Please respect my privacy as I mourn the passing and honor the memory of my dearest friend Kevin DuBrow.

Original Quiet Riot bassist Kelly Garni, who had been fired from the band after hatching a plan to kill the vocalist in 1978, urged fans to be patient and not offer any speculation until authorities ruled on the cause of death. Recognizing the negativity DuBrow's behavior had created among fans over the years, Garni asked fans to, for the sake of family and friends, resist any urge to be critical:

I ask this to all of you not only for myself but for other friends and family. I ask that no one here offer any speculation or opinions, theories or other things that could be construed as negative or, and I'm sorry for this, even sympathetic, right at this immediate time. I am already, within hours of this, having to deal with untrue rumors and speculation and that only adds fuel to that. There is a tendency for the subject of Kevin to incite flames on every board, and now is not the time for that. I will explain to everyone here the facts and the truth in the next 24 to 48 hours as I realize this will affect us all. So please, until then, be patient. All details and other pertinent info will be passed on to you here when it becomes available to me.

On December 10, 2007, media reports confirmed that DuBrow was pronounced dead on November 25, 2007, and was later determined to have died of a cocaine overdose approximately six days earlier. On January 14, 2008, Banali issued the following statement via his website regarding the future of Quiet Riot:

I have been approached to see if I would be interested in contacting Rudy Sarzo and Carlos Cavazo and to audition singers for Quiet Riot. I have also been approached to see if I would be interested in contacting and reforming the version of Quiet Riot that included Paul Shortino, Carlos Cavazo and Sean McNabb, or even to include Paul's nemesis, Paul Tallino. Let me make this very simple and perfectly clear. While I am still actively involved in the business interests of Quiet Riot and will continue in that capacity, I reject any and all suggestions to have Quiet Riot continue as a live performing entity. My friendship, love and respect for Kevin DuBrow as well as my personal love and affection for Kevin's mother and his family makes it inconceivable for me to ever entertain any ovation to reform or to continue Quiet Riot. Kevin was too important to go on without him. It would also be a disrespect to the fans who have supported Quiet Riot for nearly 25 years. I thank everyone for the wonderful and sometimes unpredictable adventure that I was able to share as a member of Quiet Riot. The only regret that I have is the loss of Kevin. May he rest in peace. I now begin life after Quiet Riot.

=== Revival with multiple vocalists (2010–2020) ===
Despite his previous statements that Quiet Riot would never reunite, Banali announced a new version of the band in September 2010 with himself on drums, Wright returning on bass, Grossi returning on guitar, and newcomer Mark Huff (formerly of the Van Halen tribute band 5150) on vocals. The band had sought the blessings of the DuBrow family, and DuBrow's mother encouraged Banali to revive the band. In July 2011, this lineup toured Germany as support for Slayer and Accept.

On January 12, 2012, while Huff was awaiting brain surgery, Quiet Riot released a statement, announcing that they had parted ways with him, and would replace him for upcoming dates with Keith St. John (formerly of Montrose). Huff was unaware of the announcement until finding out about it online. In March 2012, Banali hired unknown vocalist Scott Vokoun to fully replace Huff.

Original bassist and founding member Kelly Garni released his long-awaited autobiography in October 2012. The book covers the beginnings and early years of Quiet Riot, as well as details of Garni's friendship with founder Randy Rhoads.

In November 2013, it was announced that Vokoun had amicably parted ways with Quiet Riot, and that his replacement was Love/Hate vocalist Jizzy Pearl, who played his first show with the band on December 31 in Flagstaff, Arizona. The band then were reported to be in the recording studio working on a new studio album which was set for release some time in 2014.

In December 2013, Banali was interviewed by Loudwire, during which he discussed the future of Quiet Riot as well as their upcoming album. He revealed that the album would feature six new songs recorded in the studio, with former bassist Rudy Sarzo and Rehab session bassist Tony Franklin playing on two songs each, as well as four live songs taken from Kevin DuBrow's final professionally recorded shows with the band in 2007. Banali said of the song choices:

I made a conscious decision not to use the usual songs that people would expect. I picked tracks that were special and of the moment. Let's just say that there will be a familiar track, two unexpected choices and one that really shows the roots of Quiet Riot and how the band interacted in the live arena. I think that Quiet Riot fans will really appreciate my choices.

A Quiet Riot documentary movie, titled "Well Now You're Here, There's No Way Back" (named after a lyric in the band's hit song "Bang Your Head (Metal Health)") and directed and produced by Banali's fiancee Regina Russell, was completed around this time. It premiered at the Newport Beach Film Festival on April 29, 2014. In June 2014, the band released their new album, titled 10, their first studio release in eight years and their first since their most recent reformation.

Pearl departed the band at the end of 2016 to concentrate on his solo career, and was replaced by former Adler's Appetite and Icon vocalist Seann Nicols, formerly known as Sheldon Tarsha. On February 13, 2017, the band announced that they would release a new album Road Rage on April 21. However, in March, it was announced that Nicols had left the band and that James Durbin was the new singer. The band subsequently announced that Road Rage would be delayed until summer 2017 so that all of Nicols' vocals could be replaced by Durbin's with new lyrics and melodies. It was then announced that the new version of the album would be released on August 4 by Frontiers Music Srl.

Banali was forced to sit out several Quiet Riot shows throughout 2019 as he was receiving treatment for stage-IV pancreatic cancer, though he did not reveal his diagnosis until October of that year. He was replaced by either former Type O Negative drummer Johnny Kelly or former W.A.S.P. drummer Mike Dupke depending on each drummer's availability. In September 2019, Durbin quit the band to "follow his own path" according to Banali, and Pearl was rehired as the lead vocalist. Two months later, Quiet Riot's fourteenth studio album, and second and last to feature Durbin, Hollywood Cowboys, was released.

=== Frankie Banali's death, return of Rudy Sarzo, new lead vocalist (2020–present) ===
On August 20, 2020, Banali died from pancreatic cancer, which he had been diagnosed with sixteen months earlier, leaving him as the second member of the Metal Health-era lineup to die, following DuBrow in 2007.

On September 9, 2020, Quiet Riot announced on their Facebook page that they would continue per Banali's wishes to keep the band's legacy alive. He was replaced by Johnny Kelly, who had filled in for Banali on the band's 2019 and 2020 tours. The band embarked on their first tour since Banali's passing in the summer of 2021, and announced, in May of that year, that they were going to release new music in 2022.

On August 2, 2021, Quiet Riot announced that former bassist Rudy Sarzo would rejoin the band in early 2022, once again replacing Chuck Wright. However, Sarzo played his first show with the band in nearly two decades at The Groove Music Hall in Woodford, Virginia on November 6, 2021. In December 2021, Sarzo confirmed that new music from Quiet Riot will be released to coincide with their upcoming 2022 tour: "We have a couple of surprises coming up that are already recorded. So they're just waiting to be released. We're gonna release 'em in conjunction when we start touring in February [of 2022]." That same month, he revealed that plans were being made to celebrate the 40th anniversary of Metal Health in 2023. On December 8, 2022, Quiet Riot released the single “I Can’t Hold On” which features the lineup of Kevin Dubrow, Frankie Banali, Rudy Sarzo and Alex Grossi on guitar. This song is the last song to be recorded by Kevin DuBrow on vocals.

On July 14, 2026, Quiet Riot announced that Pearl would once again leave the band after fulfilling the band's 2026 tour dates, and also announced they were searching for a new vocalist.

On September 21, 2026, the band announced 23-year-old John Torra as their new lead singer. Torra was one of more than 700 singers submitting an audition video after the band’s open call for auditions. Following the announcement mainstream media like NBC and CBS covered the story. Torra made his live debut with the band on 1 October 2026 at the Cherokee Event Center in West Siloam Springs, Oklahoma.

== Musical style ==
Quiet Riot has been described as heavy metal, hard rock and glam metal, while their early work has been characterized as glam rock.

== Legacy ==
Ben Folds' 2001 song "Rockin' the Suburbs" mentions the band in the lines "I'm rockin' the suburbs, just like Quiet Riot did. I'm rockin' the suburbs, except that they were talented." In the album "Punk Goes 80's" (2005), Relient K covered The Bangles' song "Manic Monday" and changed two original lines to read "He says to me in his Quiet Riot voice: "C'mon feel the noise." On the Weezer track "Heart Songs" from their self-titled "Red" album, one line goes: "Quiet Riot got me started with the banging of my head."

"Metal Health" also appeared on the Crank soundtrack, as the song played during the film's opening sequence, as well as in scenes for the films Footloose and The Wrestler. "Cum On Feel the Noize" is featured in the musical Rock of Ages and in the ending credits of its 2012 film adaptation.

Professional wrestler Necro Butcher uses "Metal Health" as his entrance theme in Wrecking Ball Wrestling.

Twisted Sister guitarist Jay Jay French said that "the success of Quiet Riot allowed the success of everybody else." This is contradicted by bassist Sarzo who observed that many of the era's other prominent acts predated Quiet Riot's breakthrough: "There was a version of Ratt named Mickey Ratt at the same time as Quiet Riot in the late '70s. Great White was there. The Dokken guys were around. Nikki Sixx was playing with London. So it wasn't like Quiet Riot made it big and all those bands like Mötley Crüe and Dokken decided to get together."

== Members ==
Current members

- Rudy Sarzo – bass, backing vocals (1978–1979, 1982–1985, 1987, 1997–2003, 2021–present)
- Alex Grossi – guitars, backing vocals (2004–2005, 2006–2007, 2010–present)
- Johnny Kelly – drums (2020–present)
- John Torra – lead vocals (2026–present)

== Discography ==
=== Studio albums ===
Year	Album details	Peak chart positions								Certifications/Sales figures
Year	Album details	US	AUS	CAN	GER	NZ	NOR	SWE	UK	Certifications/Sales figures
1978	Quiet Riot (Japan only) Released: March 2, 1978	—	—	—	—	—	—	—	—	—
1978	Quiet Riot II (Japan only) Released: December 2, 1978	—	—	—	—	—	—	—	—	—
1983	Metal Health Released: February 28, 1983	1	39	5	—	33	—	—	—	US: 6× Platinum; CAN: 3× Platinum
1984	Condition Critical Released: July 16, 1984	15	47	14	42	35	13	18	71	US: Platinum; CAN Platinum
1986	QR III Released: July 1986	31	—	—	—	—	—	29	—	US: 410,000
1988	QR Released: October 21, 1988	119	—	—	—	—	—	—	—	US: 170,000
1993	Terrified Released: July 19, 1993	—	—	—	—	—	—	—	—	—
1995	Down to the Bone Released: March 1, 1995	—	—	—	—	—	—	—	—	—
1999	Alive and Well Released: March 23, 1999	—	—	—	—	—	—	—	—	—
2001	Guilty Pleasures Released: May 29, 2001	—	—	—	—	—	—	—	—	—
2006	Rehab Released: October 3, 2006	—	—	—	—	—	—	—	—	—
2014	Quiet Riot 10 Released: June 27, 2014	—	—	—	—	—	—	—	—	—
2017	Road Rage Released: August 4, 2017	—	—	—	—	—	—	—	—	—
2019	Hollywood Cowboys Released: November 8, 2019	—	—	—	—	—	—	—	—	—

=== Live albums ===
- Live at the US Festival 1983 (2012)
- One Night in Milan (2019)

=== Compilations ===
- Winners Take All (1990)
- The Randy Rhoads Years (1993)
- Greatest Hits (1996)
- Super Hits (1999)
- The Collection (2000)
- Live & Rare Volume 1 (2005)
- Extended Versions (recorded live in Pasadena and Nashville, 1983) (2007)
- Playlist: The Very Best of Quiet Riot (2008)

=== Singles/EPs ===
Year	Song	Peak chart positions				Certifications	Album
Year	Song	US	USRock	AUS	CAN	Certifications	Album
1975	"Suicidal Show"	—	—	—	—		Non-album single
1977	"It's Not So Funny" (Note: released in Japan)	—	—	—	—		Quiet Riot
1978	"Slick Black Cadillac"	—	—	—	—		Quiet Riot II
1983	"Cum on Feel the Noize"	5	7	9	8	US:Gold CAN:Gold	Metal Health
1983	"Slick Black Cadillac" [airplay]	—	32	—	—		Metal Health
1983	"Metal Health"	31	37	84	48		Metal Health
1984	"Don't Wanna Let You Go" [airplay]	—	22	—	—		Metal Health
1984	"Bad Boy" (Note: released in the UK)	—	—	—	—		Condition Critical
1984	"Mama Weer All Crazee Now"	51	13	59	50		Condition Critical
1984	"Sign of the Times" [airplay]	—	28	—	—		Condition Critical
1984	"Winners Take All"	—	—	—	—		Condition Critical
1984	"Party All Night" (Note: released in The Netherlands)	—	—	—	—		Condition Critical
1986	"The Wild and the Young"	—	—	—	—		QR III
1986	"Twilight Hotel" [promo]	—	—	—	—		QR III
1986	"Main Attraction" [promo]	—	—	—	—		QR III
1988	"Stay with Me Tonight"	—	—	—	—		QR
1988	"The Joker" (Note: released in Japan)	—	—	—	—		QR
1993	"Itchycoo Park"	—	—	—	—		Terrified
1993	"Little Angel"	—	—	—	—		Terrified
2022	"I Can't Hold On"	—	—	—	—		Non-album single

== Videography ==
=== Videos ===
- Bang Thy Head (1986)
- Live in the 21st Century (2003)
- '89 Live in Japan (2004)
- Live at the US Festival, 1983 (2012)
- Well Now You're Here, There's No Way Back (2014)
- One Night in Milan (2019)

=== Music videos ===
- "Metal Health"
- "Cum on Feel the Noize"
- "Mama Weer All Crazee Now"
- "Party All Night"
- "The Wild and the Young"
- "Twilight Hotel"
- "Stay with Me Tonight"
- "Can't Get Enough"
- "In the Blood"
- "I Can't Hold On"

== Bibliography ==
- Gett, Steve (1985). Quiet Riot: The Official Biography. Cherry Lane Music. ISBN 978-0895242792.
- Prato, Greg (2025). Bang Your Head, Feel the Noize: The Quiet Riot Story. Kindle Direct Publishing. ISBN 979-8308354222.
- Whitney, Missy (2022). Keep On Rollin' - My Fan Club Years with Kevin DuBrow & Quiet Riot. Mima Publishing. ISBN 978-0578290607.

== See also ==
- List of glam metal bands and artists
