= Quiet Riot 10 =

Studio album by Quiet Riot
- Released: June 27, 2014
- Recorded: 2007 (live), 2013–14 (new studio tracks)
- Genres: Heavy metal, hard rock
- Length: 46:30
- Label: RSM
- Producer: Frankie Banali

Quiet Riot chronology
Rehab (2006)	Quiet Riot 10 (2014)	Road Rage (2017)

Quiet Riot 10 (also alternatively known as just 10, or Quiet Riot Number 10) is the twelfth studio album by the glam metal band Quiet Riot, which was released on June 27, 2014. It is their first studio album since 1988's QR without vocalist Kevin DuBrow in any studio material following his death in 2007, and the first since said album to feature no original members. Although a studio album, the final four tracks on Quiet Riot 10 are live performances taken from some of the band's final shows with DuBrow in 2007. Love/Hate vocalist Jizzy Pearl joined the band in November 2013 and performs lead vocals on the six studio tracks.

After a longtime search for a new vocalists that went on and on, the aforementioned Jizzy Pearl, a veteran singer having worked before with L.A. Guns, Love/Hate, and Ratt, solidified the current touring line-up. Frankie Banali on drums, bassist Chuck Wright, and guitarist Alex Grossi round out the group. The album's sound mixes heavy metal with elements of blues rock and general hard rock influences. Many fans of the DuBrow-fronted incarnation of the band expressed skepticism of the album. However, it has received overall positive reviews from publications such as KNAC.com and Music Enthusiast Magazine.

== Background ==
On November 25, 2007, Quiet Riot's original singer and longtime member, Kevin DuBrow, was found dead in his Las Vegas apartment. The cause of death was determined to be an accidental cocaine overdose. The band's longtime drummer and manager, Frankie Banali, later issued a statement on his website insisting that Quiet Riot would no longer exist as a live performing or recording entity and would never reform.

However, Banali later sought the blessings of DuBrow's mother to revive the band, and he announced a new version of Quiet Riot in September 2010 with himself on drums, previous Quiet Riot bassist Chuck Wright, Alex Grossi on guitar, and newcomer Mark Huff (formerly of the Van Halen tribute band 5150) on vocals. This lineup toured throughout 2011 and there were talks of a new album. However, in early 2012, Huff was abruptly fired from the band. After former Montrose member Keith St. John filled in for the remainder of the band's touring commitments, Banali hired unknown vocalist Scott Vokoun as Huff's official replacement.

In November 2013, Quiet Riot underwent another change in vocalists when Vokoun amicably parted ways with the band, and was replaced with Love/Hate vocalist Jizzy Pearl. Shortly afterwards, Pearl entered the studio with the band to record vocal tracks for their then-recently announced upcoming album.

In December 2013, Frankie Banali was interviewed by Loudwire, during which he discussed the future of Quiet Riot as well as their then-upcoming album. He revealed that the album would feature six new songs recorded in the studio, with former bassist Rudy Sarzo and Rehab session bassist Tony Franklin playing on two songs each, as well as four live songs taken from Kevin DuBrow's final professionally recorded shows with the band in 2007. Banali said of the song choices:

"I made a conscious decision not to use the usual songs that people would expect. I picked tracks that were special and of the moment. Let’s just say that there will be a familiar track, two unexpected choices and one that really shows the roots of Quiet Riot and how the band interacted in the live arena. I think that Quiet Riot fans will really appreciate my choices."

On June 25, 2014, Quiet Riot announced the title of their album, alongside a snippet of a new song titled "Rock in Peace". The album was released only two days later online on Amazon and iTunes.

== Track listing ==
Studio
No.	Title	Length
1.	"Rock in Peace"	4:00
2.	"Bang for Your Buck"	3:52
3.	"Backside of Water"	4:18
4.	"Back on You"	3:24
5.	"Band Down"	3:17
6.	"Dogbone Alley"	4:29

Live
No.	Title	Length
7.	"Put Up or Shut Up"	4:18
8.	"Free"	4:05
9.	"South of Heaven"	5:25
10.	"Rock 'n' Roll Medley"	9:22

== Personnel ==
Quiet Riot

- Jizzy Pearl – lead vocals on studio tracks
- Alex Grossi – guitar
- Chuck Wright – bass on "Band Down", "Dogbone Alley" and all live tracks
- Frankie Banali – drums

Additional personnel

- Kevin DuBrow – lead vocals on live tracks
- Rudy Sarzo – bass on "Bang for Your Buck", and "Backside of Water"
- Tony Franklin – bass on "Rock In Peace", and "Back On You"

== Reviews and responses ==
News of the rejuvenated group met with a mixed response among fans, with Music Enthusiast Magazine remarking that "[l]ongtime listeners may scoff at the fact that ’10’ is equally comprised of both new studio material and previously unreleased live recordings". The magazine also stated that the album simply didn't amount to what "dedicated fans have been anticipating". However, the publication itself gave the album a mostly supportive review, finding that the band sounded "revived" and that the release was a "strong comeback from a previously shattered Quiet Riot".

KNAC.com published a mostly supportive review written by Andrew Depedro. He argued that he thought the group "pulled it off pretty damn well with Jizzy Pearl in command of the mic given the circumstances." He also wrote that the album "helps to add another chapter to the band's legacy and there's plenty of material of their own to merit the band's capacity in rockin' the suburbs for many more years to come."

== See also ==
- 2014 in music
- Heavy metal music
- Rehab (QR's previous album)
