= Alex Grossi =

American guitarist (born 1976)

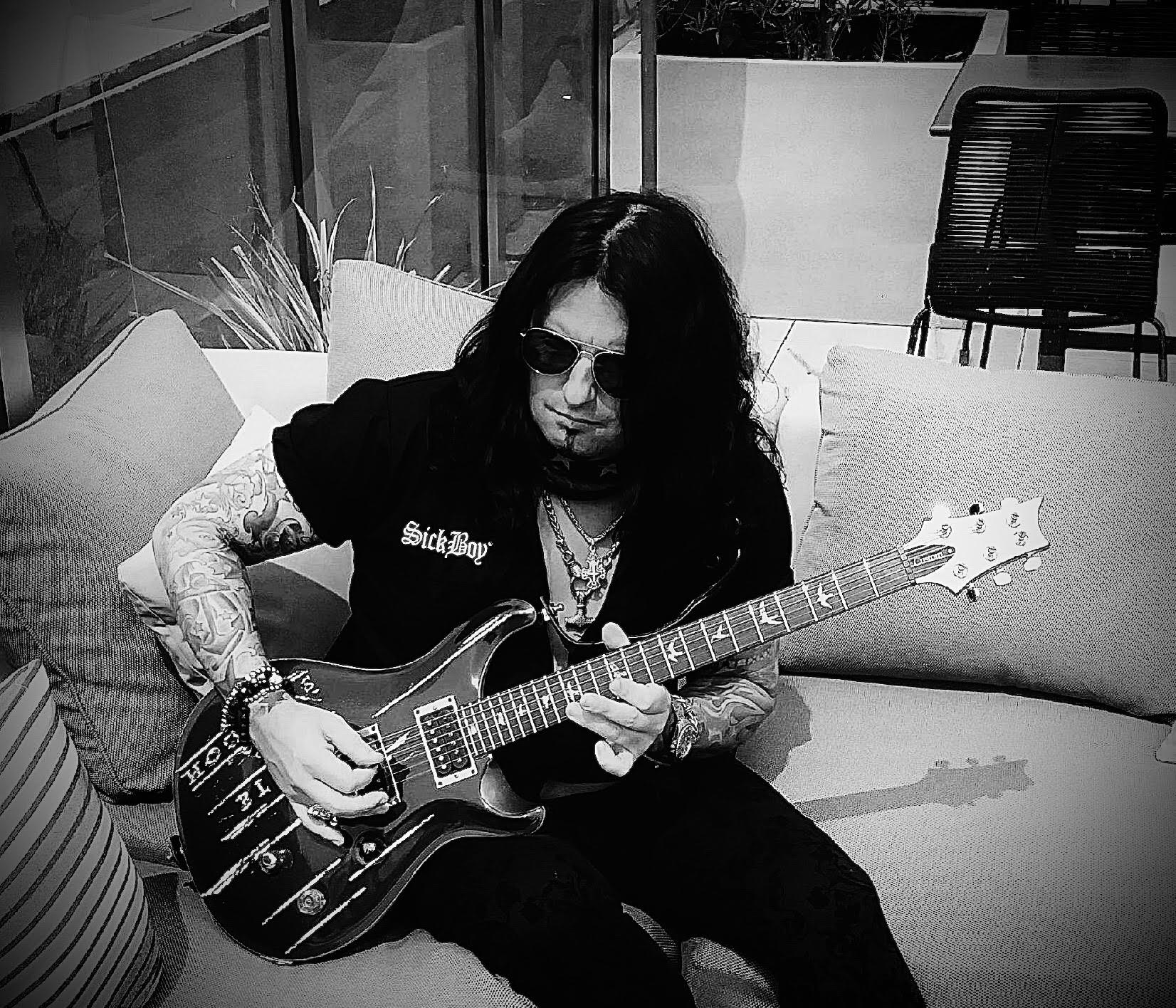
- Grossi in 2020

Background information
- Born: November 22, 1976 (age 49)
- Origin: South Windsor, Connecticut, U.S.
- Occupation: Guitarist
- Website: alexgrossimusic.com

Alex Grossi (born November 22, 1976) is an American guitarist, best known as a member of heavy metal band Quiet Riot and hard rock supergroup Hookers & Blow with Dizzy Reed.

== Biography ==
Alexander Nicholas Grossi was born Alexander Nicholas Lesbines on November 22, 1976, and grew up in South Windsor, Connecticut. At age 17 he got a job teaching guitar lessons at Riccardo's Music Center in East Hartford.

While living in Connecticut, he was lead guitarist for the band Wake Up Jack. Upon finishing high school, he moved to Boston where he joined up with Angry Salad. The band was soon signed to Atlantic Records and toured extensively until 2001, when the AOL/Time-Warner merger cost them their deal. The band was bought out of their second record and went their separate ways. In 2002 Grossi re-located to Los Angeles and quickly became one the hardest working guitarists in town, eventually landing him the guitar spot in Quiet Riot when the band re-formed in 2004.

Grossi toured with Quiet Riot in 2005 and 2006 throughout America, Europe, South America and Asia and contributed songwriting on the songs "Free" and "Strange Daze" for the 2006 Rehab and joined in for the album's 2007 tour, which included feature slots at the 2007 Sweden Rock Festival as well as the first annual Rocklahoma Festival. Grossi remained in the band until vocalist Kevin DuBrow's death. Quiet Riot disbanded in January 2008, but has since been revived by Frankie Banali and has been touring again since 2010.

Along with Dizzy Reed of Guns N' Roses, Grossi formed Hookers & Blow in 2003, shortly after Grossi's move to L.A. Dizzy Reed suggested the band's name as something for people to "Pay attention to." The group does not write music, and tours for fun with different lineups of all-star musicians.

Grossi has also written, toured and recorded with such artists as Bang Tango, Steven Adler of Guns N' Roses, Adler's Appetite, Jani Lane of Warrant, Beautiful Creatures, Love/Hate, Skid Row, Dizzy Reed of Guns N' Roses (in Hookers & Blow), Orange County hardcore band Ignite and Elektra Records singer/songwriter Aimee Allen.

In 2009 Grossi took part in the [PRS ROAD SHOW], put on by Paul Reed Smith guitars. In 2010 Adler's Appetite released "Alive", a new single. The song was released in conjunction with Adler's New York Times Bestseller tell-all biography "My Appetite for Detstruction: Sex, Drugs and Guns N' Roses" and debuted on The Howard Stern Show in July. The band also did a 50 city US tour in support of the release. On September 13, 2010, it was announced that Quiet Riot would be reforming with the line up which would include Grossi, Frankie Banali and Chuck Wright.

In 2011 Grossi formed Hotel Diablo. The band entered the studio with former Guns N' Roses guitarist Gilby Clarke producing. They released the first track "Set it Off" via iTunes and band played its first show at the Whisky a Go Go in Hollywood on September 2, 2011. In July 2012 it was announced that Hotel Diablo had signed a worldwide deal with Scarlet Records and Entertainment One for the release of the band's full-length debut "The Return To Psycho, California", which was released worldwide on September 25, 2012.

Grossi has had music placed in multiple T.V. shows and motion pictures including the Quincy Jones produced film The Smokers, the FX hit series Sons of Anarchy as well as the Walt Disney/Touchstone picture The Proposal and the VH1 series Celebrity Rehab with Dr. Drew. He has also done several TV appearances including a 2003 documentary on the Rhode Island nightclub fire for the Lifetime network.

Alex appears on Dizzy Reed's 2018 debut solo album, Rock 'N Roll Ain't Easy, a record that has been in the making for over ten years. Most recently, Alex has appeared on the latest release from Hip-Hop icons Public Enemy appearing alongside George Clinton and Cypress Hill on the track "What You Gonna Do When The Grid Goes Down"?.

== Discography ==
=== Angry Salad ===
- The Guinea Pig EP (1995)
- Bizarre Gardening Accident (1997)
- Angry Salad (1999) (ATLANTIC RECORDS)

=== Star 64 ===
- Self Titled (2001)

=== Bang Tango ===
- Ready to Go (2004) SHRAPNEL RECORDS
- Pistol Whipped In The Bible Belt (2011)

=== Beautiful Creatures ===
- Deuce (2005) (JVC RECORDS)

=== Aimee Allen ===
- Revolution (Elektra Records)

=== John Corabi / Fred Coury ===
- Home Sweet Home – An"All Star" A salute to Motley Crue (2008)

=== Hotel Diablo ===
- Psycho, California (ep) (2012)
- The Return To Psycho, California (2012) (eOne Entertainment)

=== Ignite ===
- Our Darkest Days (2006) (CENTURY MEDIA RECORDS)

=== Quiet Riot ===
- Rehab (2006) (CHAVIS RECORDS) (guitar on tracks 1 & 6)
- Quiet Riot 10 (2014)
- Road Rage (2017) (FRONTIERS RECORDS)
- Hollywood Cowboys (2019) (FRONTIERS RECORDS)
- ‘’I Can’t Hold On’’ - Single (2022) (NEW OCEAN MEDIA)

=== Steven Adler of Guns N' Roses ===
- Alive – Single Release w/ My Appetite for Destruction – Sex, Drugs and Guns N' Roses (2010)
- Stardog – Single Release (2010)
- Fading – Single Release (2010)

=== The New Strange ===
- Into The Night (2019) (GOLDEN ROBOT RECORDS)
- Tomorrow Never Comes (2019) (GOLDEN ROBOT RECORDS)

=== Public Enemy ===
- What You Gonna Do When the Grid Goes Down? (2020) w/ GEORGE CLINTON and CYPRESS HILL (UNIVERSAL/DEF JAM)

=== Hookers & Blow ===
- Shakin (2020) Single
- Rocks Off (2020) Single
- Ziggy Stardust (2020) – Single
- Trampled Underfoot (2020) Single

=== Maps to the Hollywood Scars ===
- "VOLUME ONE" (NEW OCEAN MEDIA)

=== DVD releases ===
- VH1 Metal Mania Stripped on The Strip: Volume 1 (2006)
- Getting Started with Rock Drumming featuring Steven Adler (2009)
- Sons of Anarchy season one (2009)
