= Hollywood Cowboys =

Studio album by Quiet Riot
- Released: November 8, 2019
- Recorded: April 2019
- Genre: Hard rock, heavy metal
- Length: 44:52
- Label: Frontiers
- Producer: Frankie Banali

Quiet Riot chronology
| Road Rage (2017) | Hollywood Cowboys (2019) |

Singles from Hollywood Cowboys
- 1. "Don't Call It Love" Released: 2019; 2. "Heartbreak City" Released: 2019; 3. "In the Blood" Released: 2019

Hollywood Cowboys is the fourteenth studio album by the glam metal band Quiet Riot. The album was released on Frontiers Records on November 8, 2019, and was produced by drummer Frankie Banali. This is the last album to feature Banali before his death in 2020 from pancreatic cancer (to which he was diagnosed with not long before its release), and also their last to feature vocalist James Durbin and bassist Chuck Wright before their departures in 2019 and 2021 respectively.

== Reception ==
Professional ratings
Review scores
| Source | Rating |
|---|---|
| Sonic Perspectives | 7.3/10 |
| The Spill Magazine | 3.5/5 stars |

Hollywood Cowboys received average reviews. Reviewer Aaron Badgley of The Spill Magazine said "band who knows what they do, and they do it well" but the album overall was average and contained "no mystery" and is "exactly what you would expect from Quiet Riot".

== Track listing ==
| No. | Title | Music | Length |
|---|---|---|---|
| 1. | "Don't Call It Love" | Frankie Banali, Jacob Bunton, Neil Citron | 4:06 |
| 2. | "In the Blood" | Banali, Bunton, Citron | 3:28 |
| 3. | "Heartbreak City" | Banali, Bunton, Citron | 4:15 |
| 4. | "The Devil That You Know" | Banali, Bunton, Citron | 2:40 |
| 5. | "Change or Die" | Banali, Citron, Neil Turbin | 3:23 |
| 6. | "Roll On" | Banali, Citron, August Young | 5:54 |
| 7. | "Insanity" | Banali, Citron, Turbin | 4:44 |
| 8. | "Hellbender" | Banali, Citron, Durbin | 3:20 |
| 9. | "Wild Horses" | Banali, Citron, Durbin | 3:10 |
| 10. | "Holding On" | Banali, Citron, Durbin | 4:23 |
| 11. | "Last Outcast" | Banali, Citron, Durbin | 2:35 |
| 12. | "Arrows and Angels" | Banali, Citron, Durbin | 2:54 |

Japanese bonus track
| No. | Title | Length |
|---|---|---|
| 13. | "Roll On (Acoustic)" |

== Personnel ==
Quiet Riot

- James Durbin – lead and background vocals
- Alex Grossi – guitars
- Chuck Wright – electric and upright bass
- Frankie Banali – drums, percussion

Additional musicians

- August Young – additional vocals, lyrics on "Roll On"
- Jacob Bunton – additional vocals, lyrics on "Don't Call It Love", "In the Blood", "Heartbreak City", and "The Devil That You Know"
- Neil Turbin – additional vocals, lyrics on "Change or Die" and "Insanity"
- Neil Citron – additional guitar on "Change Or Die", dobro, organ, piano on "Roll On"
