= Condition Critical =

Studio album by Quiet Riot
- Released: July 16, 1984
- Recorded: 1984
- Studios: Pasha Music House, North Hollywood, California
- Genres: Heavy metal; hard rock; glam metal
- Length: 44:02
- Label: Pasha
- Producer: Spencer Proffer

Quiet Riot chronology
Metal Health (1983)	Condition Critical (1984)	QR III (1986)

Singles from Condition Critical
- 1. "Bad Boy" Released: 1984; 2. "Mama Weer All Crazee Now" Released: 1984; 3. "Sign of the Times" Released: 1984; 4. "Winner Takes All" Released: 1984; 5. "Party All Night" Released: 1984

Condition Critical is the fourth studio album by American glam metal band Quiet Riot. Released in 1984, it did not live up to the critical and commercial success of 1983's Metal Health. However, it did sell over one million copies, peaking at No. 15 on the US Billboard 200 album chart. Like the band's previous album, Condition Critical features a Slade cover song as the second track. While the previous album included a cover of "Cum On Feel the Noize", this album contains "Mama Weer All Crazee Now".

Tracks "Party All Night" (also known as "Party All Nite") and "Mama Weer All Crazee Now" had music videos made for them, both receiving some airplay on TV. The same man with a metal mask from the last album cover is on this cover as well as many of the band's subsequent album covers, establishing him as the band's mascot. The character also has cameos in both aforementioned music videos.

The track "Stomp Your Hands, Clap Your Feet" shares its title with the original American title to Slade's 1974 album Old New Borrowed and Blue.

== Critical reception ==
Professional ratings
Review scores
Source	Rating
AllMusic	3/5 stars

As stated in the program Behind the Music, frontman Kevin DuBrow's behavior towards music journalists and fellow metal musicians – for example, he likened the magazine Hit Parader to toilet paper – was believed by many involved with the band to have affected the album's reviews. DuBrow later agreed and expressed regret.

In a 2019 interview with BraveWords, drummer Frankie Banali explained a possible reason for the album not being as strong musically as its successful predecessor. "As soon as we got back to Los Angeles after the tour, the label wanted us to go straight back into the studio to record another record – with the old 'strike while the iron is hot' type of mentality. So, we were not well-rested, and we would have been better served had we had time to really take in the previous year and then go in fresh and do another record. But we just didn't have a choice in the matter."

AllMusic critic Stephen Thomas Erlewine gave Condition Critical a mixed-to-positive review, stating that he found the band's Slade cover "Mama Weer All Crazee Now" to be the best track on the album given the "solid hook" of its guitar riffs.

Musician reviewer J. D. Considine wrote simply: "Prognosis: Terminal."

== Commercial performance ==
The album did not garner the same amount of sales as its predecessor, Metal Health. It reached the No. 15 slot on the Billboard 200.

== Track listing ==
All songs written by Kevin DuBrow, except where noted.

No.	Title	Writer(s)	Length
1.	"Sign of the Times"	Carlos Cavazo; DuBrow	5:03
2.	"Mama Weer All Crazee Now" (Slade cover)	Noddy Holder; Jim Lea	3:38
3.	"Party All Night"		3:32
4.	"Stomp Your Hands, Clap Your Feet"		4:38
5.	"Winners Take All"		5:32
6.	"Condition Critical"	Frankie Banali; Cavazo; DuBrow	5:02
7.	"Scream and Shout"	Cavazo; DuBrow; Rudy Sarzo	4:01
8.	"Red Alert"		4:28
9.	"Bad Boy"		4:21
10.	"(We Were) Born to Rock"		3:34

== Personnel ==
Quiet Riot

- Kevin DuBrow – lead vocals
- Carlos Cavazo – guitars
- Rudy Sarzo – bass
- Frankie Banali – drums

Additional personnel

- Chuck Wright – backing vocals
- Randy Bishop – backing vocals

Production

- Spencer Proffer – producer
- Duane Baron – engineer
- Jay Vigon – art direction, design

== Charts ==
Chart (1984–85)	Peak position
Australian Albums (Kent Music Report)	47
Canada Top Albums/CDs (RPM)	14
Finnish Albums (The Official Finnish Charts)	11
German Albums (Offizielle Top 100)	42
New Zealand Albums (RMNZ)	35
Norwegian Albums (VG-lista)	13
Swedish Albums (Sverigetopplistan)	18
UK Albums (Official Charts)	71
US Billboard 200	15

== Certifications ==
Region	Certification	Certified units/sales
Canada (Music Canada)	Platinum	100,000^{^}
United States (RIAA)	Platinum	1,000,000^{^}
^{^} Shipments figures based on certification alone.
