= QR (album) =

Studio album by Quiet Riot
- Released: October 21, 1988
- Recorded: Pasha Music House, Hollywood, California, 1988
- Genres: Hard rock; glam metal; blues rock
- Length: 43:58
- Label: Pasha / CBS
- Producer: Spencer Proffer

Quiet Riot chronology
QR III (1986)	QR (1988)	Terrified (1993)

Singles from QR
- 1. "Stay with Me Tonight" / "Callin' the Shots" Released: 1988; 2. "The Joker" / "Don't Wanna Be Your Fool" Released: 1988

QR (also known as Quiet Riot, Quiet Riot IV, or QR IV) is the sixth studio album by American heavy metal band Quiet Riot, released on October 21, 1988. Singer and founding member Kevin DuBrow had been fired before the recording sessions began, and replaced by Rough Cutt vocalist Paul Shortino. The band fired DuBrow because of his reputation for talking down to other bands in the press. This strained relationships the other members had with those bands. This left the album with the distinction of being the only Quiet Riot release without DuBrow on vocals during his lifetime, and the first without any original members. Bassist Chuck Wright also quit the band and was replaced by Sean McNabb.

The album also featured studio musicians Jimmy Waldo (keyboards) and Jimmy Johnson, who played bass on "Stay with Me Tonight" and "Coppin' a Feel". The album was produced by Spencer Proffer, who had produced every Quiet Riot U.S. released album up to this point. Paul Shortino and Sean McNabb later played together on Rough Cutt's Sneak Peek EP.

== Overview ==
QR was intended to be released under a new moniker; however, the band was contractually forced to use the Quiet Riot name. As such, the album was another shift in musical style for them, featuring a hard rock, glam metal and blues rock sound with emphasis on ballads. Due to the confusion over the album's proper title, Paul Shortino was asked in 2015 on Twitter what the proper name of the album was, and he replied back that the name is simply "QR".

Reaction to the album at the time was tepid, but did manage to attract a bit more interest than its predecessor, QR III (1986). However, the only major single spawned from the album, "Stay with Me Tonight" made a small dent in the pop charts and the video received moderate airplay on MTV in late 1988, but nothing comparable to the impact that previous albums had. Despite this, it was remastered by Jon Astley and rereleased by Rock Candy Records in 2010.

== Critical reception ==
=== Contemporary reviews ===
Professional ratings
Review scores
Source	Rating
Kerrang!	4.5/5 stars
Los Angeles Times	3/5 stars
The Record	1/4 stars

Upon its release, Gary Blockus of The Morning Call wrote: "Now that Dubrow is gone, Quiet Riot is finally able to showcase its true talent. Shortino is a cross between a soulful Robert Plant and David Lee Roth, but in no way is a Kingdom Clone. One listen will tell you this is atypical Quiet Riot. Dubrow's departure was a gift for this band." John C. Evosevic of The Pittsburgh Press wrote: "Shortino possesses an expressive, controlled baritone akin to Whitesnake's David Coverdale, but more raspy. He contributes to the songwriting and brings into the band a tougher, bluesier, heavier sound. Thankfully gone with Dubrow are the dopey teen anthems. This album is a pleasant surprise. Although [it] sounds tentative in spots, on the whole it is filled with smart, mature heavy rock."

Janiss Garza of the Los Angeles Times wrote: "This smoky, moody LP bears little relation to the bold, brash feel imparted by ex-frontman Kevin DuBrow. New singer Paul Shortino's passion-soaked vocals surround the melodic, often contemplative songs on this ballad-heavy album." Dave Gattinger of The Leader-Post commented: "Quiet Riot is back, and may have found the sound to climb back to the top. Shortino has brought some heart and soul in addition to rough and ripping vocals reminiscent of Aerosmith's Steven Tyler."

Billboard wrote: "Absence of former vocalist Kevin DuBrow is at least partially felt by this once-platinum metal band. New vocalist Paul Shortino tries hard, but album's general anonymity - along with songs' lack of pop hooks - does not bode well." Barbara Jaeger of The Record commented: "The changes [to the line-up of the band] haven't resulted in any improvement. Quiet Riot is still a run-of-the-mill metal band, long on heavy metal cliches and short on originality."

=== Retrospective reviews ===
Professional ratings
Review scores
Source	Rating
AllMusic	1/5 stars

In a retrospective review, Barry Weber of AllMusic commented: "Shortino sounds competent, but overall he lacks the general charisma of Dubrow. The real problem with the album, however, is the songs themselves, which are loaded with unmemorable lyrics and melodies. The performances on QR make the album horribly faceless; the record shows a once-popular rock group trying to retain their glory days with a handful of disgustingly generic material."

Sleaze Roxx was more positive, noting that while the odds were against it, the album was a "spectacular statement, drinking from the same bluesy well as Whitesnake, Rainbow, and Dio." They added that Shortino's vocals are both "impressive and effective" and that it may have been more successful under a different name.

== Track listing ==
No.	Title	Writer(s)	Length
1.	"Stay with Me Tonight"	Frankie Banali; Carlos Cavazo; Spencer Proffer; Paul Shortino	4:40
2.	"Callin' the Shots"	Banali; Cavazo; Proffer; Shortino; Jimmy Waldo	4:41
3.	"Run to You"	Banali; Cavazo; Shortino; Waldo	4:38
4.	"I'm Fallin'"	Banali; Cavazo; Proffer; Shortino; Waldo	4:17
5.	"King of the Hill"	Banali; Cavazo; Trevor Rabin; Shortino	4:24
6.	"The Joker"	Banali; Cavazo; Jon Kirksey; Proffer; Shortino	3:55
7.	"Lunar Obsession"	Banali; Cavazo; Shortino	1:44
8.	"Don't Wanna Be Your Fool"	Banali; Cavazo; Shortino; Waldo	5:02
9.	"Coppin' a Feel"	Banali; Cavazo; Mary Dean; Shortino	3:44
10.	"In a Rush"	Banali; Cavazo; Proffer; Shortino	2:38
11.	"Empty Promises"	Banali; Cavazo; Proffer; Shortino; Waldo	4:26

== Personnel ==
=== Quiet Riot ===
- Paul Shortino - lead and backing vocals
- Carlos Cavazo - guitars, backing vocals
- Sean McNabb - bass, backing vocals
- Frankie Banali - drums, percussion

=== Additional musicians ===
- Jimmy Waldo - keyboards, backing vocals
- Jimmy Johnson - bass on “Stay With Me Tonight” & ”Coppin' A Feel”

=== Production ===
- Spencer Proffer - producer
- Hanspeter Huber, Alex Woltman, Jeff Clark - engineer, mixing
- Steve Hall - mastering
- Hugh Syme - art direction

== Charts ==
Chart (1988)	Peak position
US Billboard 200	119
