= Metal Health =

Studio album by Quiet Riot
- Released: February 28, 1983
- Studios: Pasha Music House, North Hollywood, California
- Genres: Heavy metal; hard rock; glam metal
- Length: 40:57
- Label: Pasha
- Producer: Spencer Proffer

Quiet Riot chronology
Quiet Riot II (1978)	Metal Health (1983)	Condition Critical (1984)

Singles from Metal Health
- 1. "Cum On Feel the Noize" Released: July 1983; 2. "Metal Health (Bang Your Head)" Released: November 1983

Professional ratings
Review scores
Source	Rating
AllMusic	link
Sputnikmusic	3.5/5

Metal Health is the third studio album by the American heavy metal band Quiet Riot, released on February 28, 1983, through Pasha Records. It was the band's first album to receive a worldwide release, and the first to feature guitarist Carlos Cavazo and drummer Frankie Banali. The album spawned two hit singles: the Slade cover "Cum On Feel the Noize" and "Metal Health".

Metal Health was the first heavy metal album to reach number one on the Billboard 200 chart, replacing The Police's Synchronicity at number one in November 1983. Due to its commercial success, Metal Health is regarded by some as the catalyst that opened the door for hair metal's immense popularity throughout the next several years. The album went on to sell more than ten million copies worldwide and over six million in the U.S. alone, being certified six-times platinum by the RIAA.

In 2015, "Sleazegrinder" of Louder included the song in his list of "The 20 Greatest Hair Metal Anthems Of All Time", placing it third. In 2018, Collin Brennan of Consequence included the album in his list of "10 Hair Metal Albums That Don’t Suck".

== Overview ==
The band parted ways with bassist Chuck Wright early in the recording process, and replacement Gary Van Dyke was not working out. Vocalist Kevin DuBrow asked the band's former bassist Rudy Sarzo to take part in the recording of "Thunderbird", a song written as a tribute to the band's founder Randy Rhoads, who died in a 1982 plane crash. While DuBrow began writing the song while Rhoads was still alive, it wasn't completed until after the guitarist's death. The partnership was quite fruitful and Sarzo ended up recording several songs with the band, and he ultimately left his spot with Ozzy Osbourne to re-join Quiet Riot as a permanent member.

In support of the album, Quiet Riot opened for Black Sabbath on their Born Again Tour in the US. They also managed to secure a spot at the 1983 US Festival alongside established acts such as Ozzy Osbourne and Judas Priest. Prior to Quiet Riot's US Festival performance, Sarzo was punched in the face backstage by a drunken Osbourne, still bitter over the bassist leaving him to rejoin Quiet Riot several months prior.

Due to the band's subsequent failure to match Metal Health's commercial success, Quiet Riot has at times been referred to as "one-hit wonders". This is not correct, however, as the band had two songs reach the Billboard Top 40 on the Hot 100, in addition to a subsequent album being certified Platinum by the RIAA for over one million album sales. The title track was ranked No. 35 on VH1's 40 Greatest Metal Songs. "Slick Black Cadillac" is a re-recording of a song that appeared on the band's 1978 album Quiet Riot II.

== Artwork ==
The album cover art was designed by Stan Watts, who had previously designed the covers for The Doobie Brothers' Best of The Doobies Volume II (1981), Black Sabbath's Live Evil (1982) and Martin Briley's One Night with a Stranger (1983), as well as the poster for the film The Howling (1981). Frankie Banali later stated that Quiet Riot had wanted to create an icon for the band, and that Sarzo had suggested something akin to Alexandre Dumas' "The Man in the Iron Mask" (1847). While many thought the masked cover model was DuBrow, it was actually Watts himself, whose wife took the photo of him, which he then airbrushed for a "dramatic, high-contrast look". The mask became so popular that DuBrow wore a similar one on the cover of the band's follow-up album, 1984's Condition Critical.

== Track listing ==
No.	Title	Writer(s)	Length
1.	"Metal Health"	Frankie Banali; Carlos Cavazo; Tony Cavazo; Kevin DuBrow	5:17
2.	"Cum On Feel the Noize" (Slade cover)	Noddy Holder; Jim Lea	4:51
3.	"Don't Wanna Let You Go"	C.Cavazo; DuBrow	4:43
4.	"Slick Black Cadillac"	DuBrow	4:13
5.	"Love's a Bitch"	DuBrow	4:11
6.	"Breathless"	C.Cavazo; DuBrow	3:51
7.	"Run for Cover"	C.Cavazo; DuBrow	3:38
8.	"Battle Axe" (instrumental)	C.Cavazo	1:39
9.	"Let's Get Crazy"	DuBrow	4:08
10.	"Thunderbird"	DuBrow	4:43

== Personnel ==
Credits adapted from LP liner notes.

Quiet Riot

- Kevin DuBrow – lead vocals, backing vocals, mike stand
- Carlos Cavazo – guitars, backing vocals
- Rudy Sarzo – bass guitars, backing vocals
- Frankie Banali – drums, percussion, car horn, backing vocals

Additional musicians

- Pat Regan – keyboards
- Tuesday Knight – backing vocals ("Thunderbird")
- Chuck Wright – bass guitar ("Don't Wanna Let You Go", "Metal Health"), backing vocals
- "Riot Squad" (Frankie Banali, Carlos Cavazo, Kevin DuBrow, Spencer Proffer, Donna Slattery) – backing vocals ("Let's Get Crazy")

Technical

- Spencer Proffer – producer, additional engineering
- Duane Baron – engineer
- Csaba Petocz – additional engineering
- Jay Vigon – art direction, design
- Quiet Riot – concept
- Stan Watts – cover illustration
- Sam Emerson – back cover photographs
- Ron Sobol – button photos

== Charts ==
Chart (1983–84)	Peak position
Australian Albums (Kent Music Report)	39
Canada Top Albums/CDs (RPM)	5
New Zealand Albums (RMNZ)	33
US Billboard 200	1

== Certifications ==
Region	Certification	Certified units/sales
Canada (Music Canada)	3× Platinum	300,000^{^}
United States (RIAA)	6× Platinum	6,000,000^{^}
^{^} Shipments figures based on certification alone.

== Accolades ==
Publication	Country	Accolade	Rank
Consequence of Sound	US	10 Hair Metal Albums That Don't Suck	3
Rolling Stone	US	50 Greatest Hair Metal Albums of All Time	15
Loudwire	US	Top 30 Hair Metal Albums	11
