= Quiet Riot II =

Studio album by Quiet Riot
- Released: December 2, 1978
- Recorded: August–November 1978
- Studios: The Record Plant, Los Angeles
- Genres: Hard rock; glam rock
- Length: 41:13
- Label: CBS Sony
- Producers: Warren Entner, Lee De Carlo

Quiet Riot chronology
Quiet Riot (1978)	Quiet Riot II (1978)	Metal Health (1983)

Singles from Quiet Riot II
- 1. "Slick Black Cadillac" Released: 1978

Professional ratings
Review scores
Source	Rating
AllMusic	2.5/5 stars

Quiet Riot II is the second studio album by American heavy metal band Quiet Riot. It was released exclusively in Japan on December 2, 1978. It is the last Quiet Riot album with guitarist Randy Rhoads, who later gained recognition for playing on Ozzy Osbourne's first two solo albums.

== Overview ==
Although bassist Rudy Sarzo is credited and pictured on the album cover, Quiet Riot II was recorded before he joined the band, and the work of bassist Kelly Garni is featured on the album. Tensions between Garni and vocalist Kevin DuBrow boiled over during the album's recording, with Garni hatching a plan to shoot and kill DuBrow at the studio. Garni was arrested and immediately fired from Quiet Riot.

The track Afterglow (Of Your Love) is a cover of a song by The Small Faces, composed by Steve Marriott and Ronnie Lane. The album's opening track, "Slick Black Cadillac", was re-recorded by Quiet Riot for their 1983 breakthrough album Metal Health.

== Track listing ==
No.	Title	Writer(s)	Length
1.	"Slick Black Cadillac"	Kevin DuBrow; Randy Rhoads	5:10
2.	"You Drive Me Crazy"	DuBrow; Rhoads	4:17
3.	"Afterglow (Of Your Love)" (Small Faces cover)	Ronnie Lane; Steve Marriott	3:37
4.	"Eye for an Eye"	DuBrow; Rhoads; Ron Sobol	4:02
5.	"Trouble"	DuBrow; Rhoads	5:10
6.	"Killer Girls"	DuBrow; Rhoads; Sobol	4:50
7.	"Face to Face"	DuBrow; Rhoads	4:38
8.	"Inside You"	DuBrow	4:49
9.	"We've Got the Magic"	Rhoads	4:40

== Personnel ==
=== Quiet Riot ===
- Kevin DuBrow – vocals
- Randy Rhoads – guitars, bass (uncredited), organ, backing vocals
- Drew Forsyth – drums, syndrum, backing vocals
- Rudy Sarzo – bass, backing vocals (credited as band member but does not play on album)

=== Additional musicians ===
- Kelly Garni – bass, backing vocals (uncredited)
- The Killer Bees – backing vocals

=== Production ===
- Warren Entner – producer, manager
- Lee De Carlo – producer
