= Terrified (Quiet Riot album) =

Studio album by Quiet Riot
- Released: July 19, 1993
- Genres: Heavy metal, hard rock
- Length: 52:30
- Label: Moonstone
- Producers: Kevin DuBrow, Ricky DeLena

Quiet Riot chronology
QR (1988)	Terrified (1993)	The Randy Rhoads Years (1993)

Alternative German cover

Singles from Terrified
- 1. "Itchycoo Park" Released: 1993; 2. "Little Angel" Released: 1993

Professional ratings
Review scores
Source	Rating
Allmusic	2/5 stars

Terrified is the seventh album by American glam metal band Quiet Riot. It is the band's first album in five years, and marks the return of singer Kevin DuBrow after his firing in 1987. It is bassist Kenny Hillery's only studio album with the band, and drummer Bobby Rondinelli plays on several songs. Many of the album's songs were featured in Charles Band's movie Dollman vs. Demonic Toys, with the album itself being released on Moonstone Records, the soundtrack offshoot of Band's film company Full Moon Entertainment.

The song "Itchycoo Park" is a cover of the Small Faces' single from 1967. This was not the first time the band had covered a Small Faces song, they had also done covers of their music on their first two albums, which featured Randy Rhoads.

This is the first Quiet Riot album released internationally not to feature the production work of Spencer Proffer.

In 1994, the album won the American Indie Music Award for the Heavy Metal category.

Although the band have recorded another six studio albums following Terrified, the band's last non-promotional single was issued from this album. In Germany, the band's cover of the "Itchycoo Park" was issued as a CD single via Concrete, with distribution by Edel. Concrete was a project of Edel which specialized in rock releases. The single, which featured the album track "Rude Boy" as the B-side, was not a commercial success. Additionally, in February 1993, the band issued the one-track promotional single "Little Angel" in America, which was released by Moonstone Records. The single featured a picture CD of an almost topless woman, and a custom printed back insert.

== Release ==
The album was released by Moonstone Records on CD and cassette in America only. In Scandinavia it was issued on CD via Mega Records. In Japan the album was issued via Alfa Records, Inc as a CD, which was the only version of the album to feature the exclusive bonus track "Wishing Well" - a cover of the song originally performed by English rock group Free, taken from their 1972 album Heartbreaker. In 1994, Fonomusic would issue Terrified on CD in Spain.

In 2002, Arena Records re-issued the album in Germany under the opening track title "Cold Day in Hell". The CD release featured new artwork of the line-up of the time, including bassist Rudy Sarzo, although he was not a member of the band when Terrified was recorded. The album also was released on vinyl under license by Night Of The Vinyl Dead Records, limited to 350 copies.

== Track listing ==
No.	Title	Writer(s)	Length
1.	"Cold Day in Hell"	Frankie Banali; Carlos Cavazo; Kevin DuBrow; Kenny Hillery	6:03
2.	"Loaded Gun"	Cavazo; DuBrow	6:20
3.	"Itchycoo Park" (Small Faces cover)	Ronnie Lane; Steve Marriott	3:56
4.	"Terrified"	David Arkenstone	4:13
5.	"Rude Boy"	DuBrow; Sean Manning	5:50
6.	"Dirty Lover"	DuBrow	5:44
7.	"Psycho City"	DuBrow; Manning	6:00
8.	"Rude, Crude Mood"	DuBrow; Manning; Harry Perris	3:45
9.	"Little Angel"	Arkenstone; Steve Priest	3:58
10.	"Resurrection" (Instrumental)	Cavazo	6:10
11.	"Wishing Well" (bonus track - Free cover)	John Bundrick; Simon Kirke; Paul Kossoff; Paul Rodgers; Tetsu Yamauchi	3:28

== Personnel ==
Quiet Riot

- Kevin DuBrow – lead vocals
- Carlos Cavazo – guitars
- Kenny Hillery – bass
- Frankie Banali – drums
- Bobby Rondinelli – drums

Additional musicians

- Chuck Wright – backing vocals on "Loaded Gun"
- Sean Manning – backing vocals on "Cold Day in Hell & Rude Boy"

Production

- Kevin DuBrow – producer
- Ricky DeLena – producer
- Brian Virtue – assistant engineer
