= The Wild and the Young =

1986 song by Quiet Riot

Single by Quiet Riot

from the album QR III
- B-side: "Rise or Fall"
- Released: 1986
- Length: 3:37
- Label: Pasha
- Songwriters: Spencer Proffer; Frankie Banali; Carlos Cavazo; Kevin DuBrow; Chuck Wright
- Producer: Spencer Proffer

Quiet Riot singles chronology
"Party All Night" (1984)	"The Wild and the Young" (1986)	"Stay with Me Tonight" (1988)

Music video
- "The Wild and the Young" on YouTube

"The Wild and the Young" is a song by American heavy metal band Quiet Riot, released in 1986 as the lead single from their fifth studio album QR III. The song was written by Spencer Proffer, Frankie Banali, Carlos Cavazo, Kevin DuBrow and Chuck Wright, and was produced by Proffer.

== Music video ==
The song's music video was directed by Jeff Stein and produced by Michael Ader. It received its premiere on MTV on 11 July 1986 and went on to achieve active rotation on the channel. It peaked at number 30 on the Cash Box Top 30 Music Videos chart in October 1986.

The video, which has been described as a "rock-censorship satire", was inspired by the 1985 Senate hearings concerning explicit lyrics in heavy metal songs. The video portrays an Orwellian picture of the future where a totalitarian government has banned rock and roll. An opening text reads "IN THE FUTURE THERE WILL BE...", which then cuts to a dictator (played by Wink Martindale) repeatedly stating, "No rock and roll!" Armed forces are used to imprison musicians in detention zones and guitars are thrown into shredding machines. At the detention zone, Quiet Riot successfully escapes through a utility hole into an underground storage area and pick out instruments with which they perform the song. By the end of their performance, the band are surrounded by the military who are ordered by their commander to open fire. DuBrow then awakes on a tour bus to find himself surrounded by the rest of the band and together watch an announcement on TV which states: "In Washington, Congress has just passed legislation that requires record companies to reproduce song lyrics on all album jackets. Warning stickers must be affixed to alert parents to explicit subject matter. The government has also cited the rock and roll band, Quiet Riot, as one of the chief offenders in this ongoing controversy." The driver of the tour bus is revealed to be the military commander, suggesting DuBrow's nightmare was in fact real. The video ends with the tour bus driving into a hangar guarded by troops and the military commander walks up to the camera and covers it with her hand while shouting "Stop!"

== Critical reception ==
Upon its release, Nancy Erlich of Billboard described "The Wild and the Young" as "semi-rebellious melodic metal". Cash Box praised it as a "charging, anthemic heavy metal cut". They considered it to have "CHR potential with hooks that bite deep" and believed the band "presents evidence of a widening audience with this scorcher". They added, "A fierce vocal drives the tune, aided by a heavy and often lurking percussion. Fiery guitars in the distinctive metal mode give it extra teeth, along with a rousing, defiant chorus." Gavin Report wrote, "Big sounding, not too metal, and careful not to stray too far away from all the changing and repetition Quiet Riot's known for. They even borrow a few twelve inch dance mix ideas on that middle section." Bill Novak of The Sheboygan Press gave the single a three out of four star rating and commented, "I'm not a heavy metal fan, but this single is quite good. I mean it actually has structure, something usually not found in head-banging music."

In a review of the song's music video, Lydia Kolb of The Paducah Sun felt it "expresses some of the exaggerated fears some people have about censorship" and noted that DuBrow is "hardly recognizable" due to his "much longer hair". Keith L. Thomas of The Atlanta Journal-Constitution considered it to "look like a cross between a Mad Max movie and Woody Allen's hilarious sci-fi classic, Sleeper" and felt the idea behind the video "isn't that original, but Quiet Riot makes it entertaining". He considered the song to be "standard Quiet Riot" with "gut-busting drums, slashing guitars and scream-at-the-top-of-your-lungs vocals". Dave Koen of The Arizona Daily Star was negative in his review, stating, "Rock, and rock video will do just fine without a self-indulging video defense from some heavy metal nimrods."

== Track listing ==
7–inch single (US, Canada, UK, Europe and Australia)

1. "The Wild and the Young" – 3:37
2. "Rise or Fall" – 4:08

7–inch single (Mexico)

1. "The Wild and the Young" – 3:37
2. "Put Up or Shut Up" – 4:07

12–inch single (UK)

1. "The Wild and the Young" – 3:35
2. "Cum On Feel the Noize" – 3:20
3. "Rise or Fall" – 4:00

== Personnel ==
Quiet Riot

- Kevin DuBrow – lead vocals, backing vocals
- Carlos Cavazo – guitar, backing vocals
- Chuck Wright – bass guitar, backing vocals
- Frankie Banali – drums, electric and acoustic percussion

Additional musicians

- John Purdell – keyboards, programming, backing vocals

Production

- Spencer Proffer – production (all tracks)
- Duane Baron – engineering
- Hanspeter Huber – engineering
- Alex Woltman – additional engineering
- Kevin Lahue – engineering assistant
- Jeff Clark – engineering assistant
- Steve Hall – mastering

Other

- Neil Zlozower – photography

== Charts ==
Chart (1986)	Peak position
UK Heavy Metal Singles (Spotlight Research)	19
US AOR Tracks (Radio & Records)	49
