= QR III =

Studio album by Quiet Riot
- Released: July 1986
- Recorded: November 1985 – May 1986
- Studios: Pasha Music House, North Hollywood, California
- Genres: Glam metal; hard rock
- Length: 42:09
- Label: Pasha / CBS
- Producer: Spencer Proffer

Quiet Riot chronology
Condition Critical (1984)	QR III (1986)	QR (1988)

Singles from QR III
- 1. "The Wild and the Young" Released: 1986; 2. "Main Attraction" Released: 1986; 3. "Twilight Hotel" Released: 1986

Professional ratings
Review scores
Source	Rating
AllMusic	2/5 stars
Kerrang!	3/5 stars
Sounds	2.5/5 stars

QR III (or Quiet Riot III) is the fifth studio album by American heavy metal band Quiet Riot. Released in July 1986, it departs from the heavy metal of the band's previous two albums for a more melodic glam metal and hard rock sound. There are also AOR elements and keyboards, courtesy of John Purdell.

== Background ==
Following the massive success of Metal Health and the more modest success of Condition Critical, sales of QR III were lower, reaching only No. 31 on the US charts and not achieving any certification. It marked Quiet Riot's fall from stardom as only one more of the band's following releases entered the charts at all.

QR III is the first Quiet Riot album to feature Chuck Wright, formerly of Giuffria, on bass as an official member. He previously played bass on 2 tracks from Metal Health. He departed soon after, but rejoined the band on an on/off basis over for years.

The accompanying video for lead single, "The Wild and the Young," painted an Orwellian picture of the future, where totalitarian militarists fought to wipe out rock and roll — a reference to the Senate hearings concerning explicit language in metal songs. The video received active rotation on MTV. Another video for the promotional single "Twilight Hotel" only managed to get light rotation.

== Track listing ==
Credits taken from album liner notes.

No.	Title	Writer(s)	Length
1.	"Main Attraction"	Frankie Banali; Carlos Cavazo; Kevin DuBrow; Spencer Proffer; John Purdell; Chuck Wright	4:43
2.	"The Wild and the Young"	Banali; Cavazo; DuBrow; Proffer; Wright	3:37
3.	"Twilight Hotel"	Banali; Cavazo; DuBrow; Proffer; Wright	4:35
4.	"Down and Dirty"	Banali; Cavazo; DuBrow; Wright	3:15
5.	"Rise or Fall"	Banali; Cavazo; DuBrow; Wright	4:01
6.	"Put Up or Shut Up"	Banali; Cavazo; DuBrow; Wright	4:07
7.	"Still of the Night"	Banali; Cavazo; DuBrow; Proffer; Purdell; Wright	4:42
8.	"Bass Case" (Instrumental)	Wright	0:59
9.	"The Pump"	Banali; Cavazo; DuBrow; Wright	4:02
10.	"Slave to Love"	Banali; Stan Bush; Cavazo; DuBrow; Proffer; Wright	3:55
11.	"Helping Hands"	Banali; Cavazo; DuBrow; Wright	4:13

== Personnel ==
=== Quiet Riot ===
- Kevin DuBrow – lead vocals, backing vocals, guitar
- Carlos Cavazo – guitar, backing vocals
- Chuck Wright – bass, backing vocals
- Frankie Banali – drums, electric & acoustic percussion

=== Additional personnel ===
- John Purdell – keyboards, programming
- Marcus Barone – EMU sampling, emulator
- Bobby Kimball – backing vocals on "Still of the Night"
- Debra Raye, Michelle Rohl – backing vocals on "The Pump"
- Jimmy Whitney and the Bible of Dreams Choir – backing vocals on "Slave to Love"

=== Production ===
- Spencer Proffer – producer
- John Purdell – producer
- Hugh Syme – art direction and cover painting

== Charts ==
Chart (1986)	Peak position
Finnish Albums (The Official Finnish Charts)	13
Swedish Albums (Sverigetopplistan)	29
US Billboard 200	31
