= Carlos Cavazo =

American guitarist (born 1957)

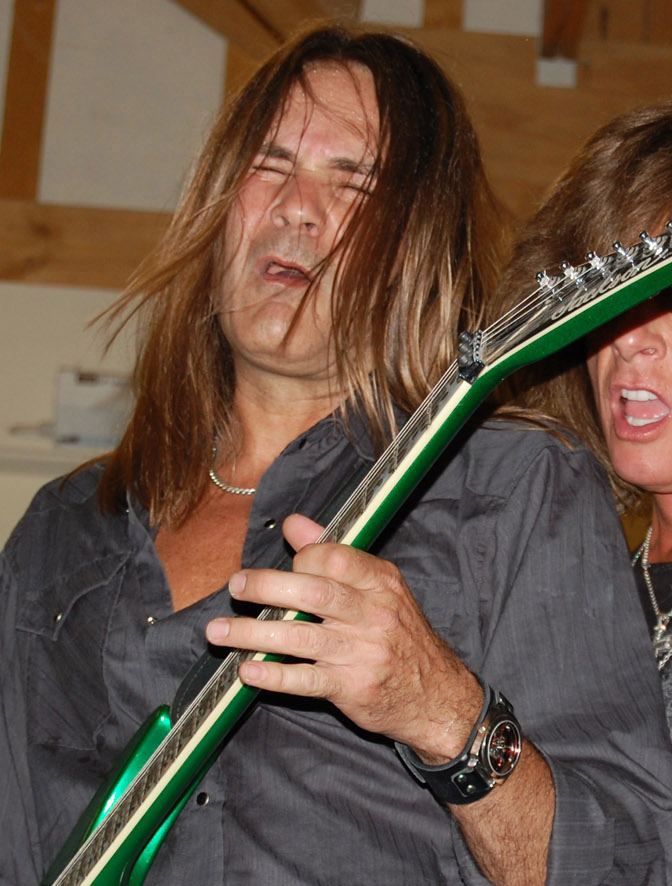
- Cavazo performing with Big Noize in 2008

Background information
- Born: July 8, 1957 (age 69); Atlanta, GA
- Genres: Glam metal, hard rock, heavy metal
- Occupation: Guitarist
- Years active: 1973–present
- Member of: King Kobra, Hurricane
- Formerly of: Quiet Riot, Hear 'n Aid, Ratt, Snow, Big Noize

Carlos Cavazo (born July 8, 1957) is an American musician best known as the guitarist for heavy metal band Quiet Riot during their commercial peak. He has also played with Snow, 3 Legged Dogg, Hollywood Allstarz, and Ratt.

== Biography ==
Cavazo was born in Atlanta, Georgia on July 8, 1957 to a Mexican father and an American mother. He formed the band Speed of Light with his older brother Tony in 1973 in Anaheim (Hills), Orange County, California. Carlos would have been part of the 1st graduating at Canyon High School, however, he left school his senior year to pursue music. The band would evolve into Snow by 1978 with the addition of vocalist Doug Ellison and drummer Stephen Quadros. Snow built up a loyal following on the L.A. club circuit over the next couple of years and in 1980 released a self-financed eponymous 5-song EP, re-issued as part of the At Last archives release in 2017. Snow played a reunion show at the Whisky a Go Go on November 8, 2017 (with Amargo, Stonebreed, Angeles and, Pancho Villa's Skull) to celebrate the release of At Last.

Replacing Randy Rhoads in the reformed Quiet Riot in 1982 he remained with the band into the 2000s until the band split up. However, when vocalist Kevin DuBrow reformed the band to record the 2006 album Rehab, Cavazo was not included.

In June 1997, Cavazo was pistol-whipped and restrained in his own home during a robbery.

Cavazo was a founding member of 3 Legged Dogg, a supergroup made up of drummer Vinny Appice (Black Sabbath, Dio, Heaven & Hell), bassist Jimmy Bain (Rainbow, Dio), vocalist Chas West (Bonham, Foreigner) and guitarist Brian Young (David Lee Roth). They released one album, Frozen Summer in 2006.

Until spring of 2018, he was a member of Ratt, replacing John Corabi in 2008.

Carlos is currently a member of the bands King Kobra and Hurricane, which he joined in 2021 and 2023, respectively.

== Discography ==
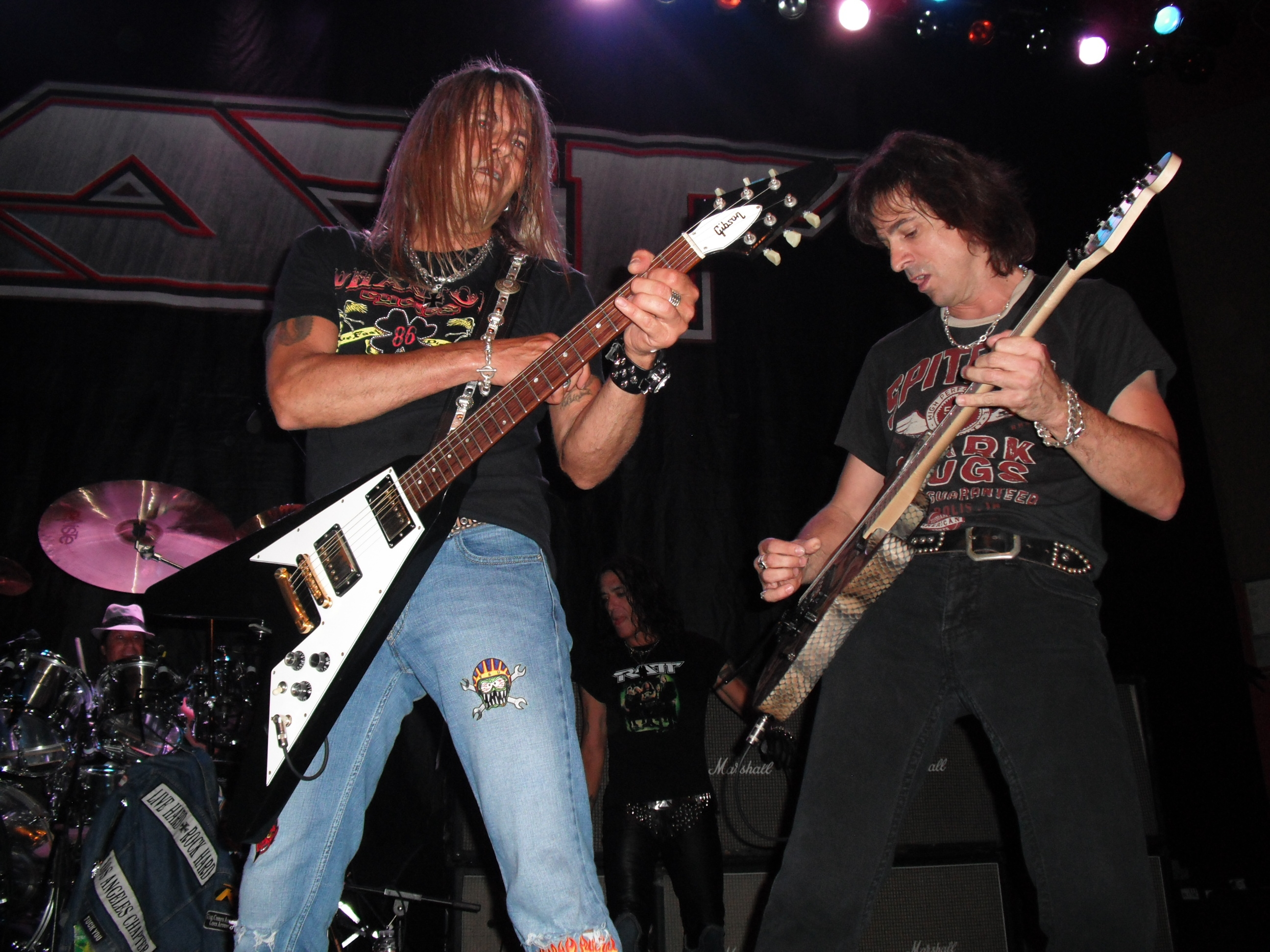
Cavazo (left) and Warren DeMartini with Ratt in 2010

=== Snow ===
- 1980 Snow

=== Max Havoc, LTD ===
- 1983 Max Havoc

=== Quiet Riot ===
- 1983 Metal Health
- 1984 Condition Critical
- 1986 QR III
- 1988 QR
- 1993 Terrified
- 1993 The Randy Rhoads Years
- 1995 Down to the Bone
- 1999 Alive and Well
- 2001 Guilty Pleasures

=== Hear 'n Aid ===
- 1985 Hear 'n Aid

=== 3 Legged Dogg ===
- 2006 Frozen Summer

=== Power Project ===
- 2006 Dinosaurs

=== Tim "Ripper" Owens ===
- 2009 Play My Game

=== Ratt ===
- 2010 Infestation

=== King Kobra ===
- 2023 We Are Warriors
