= List of W.A.S.P. band members =

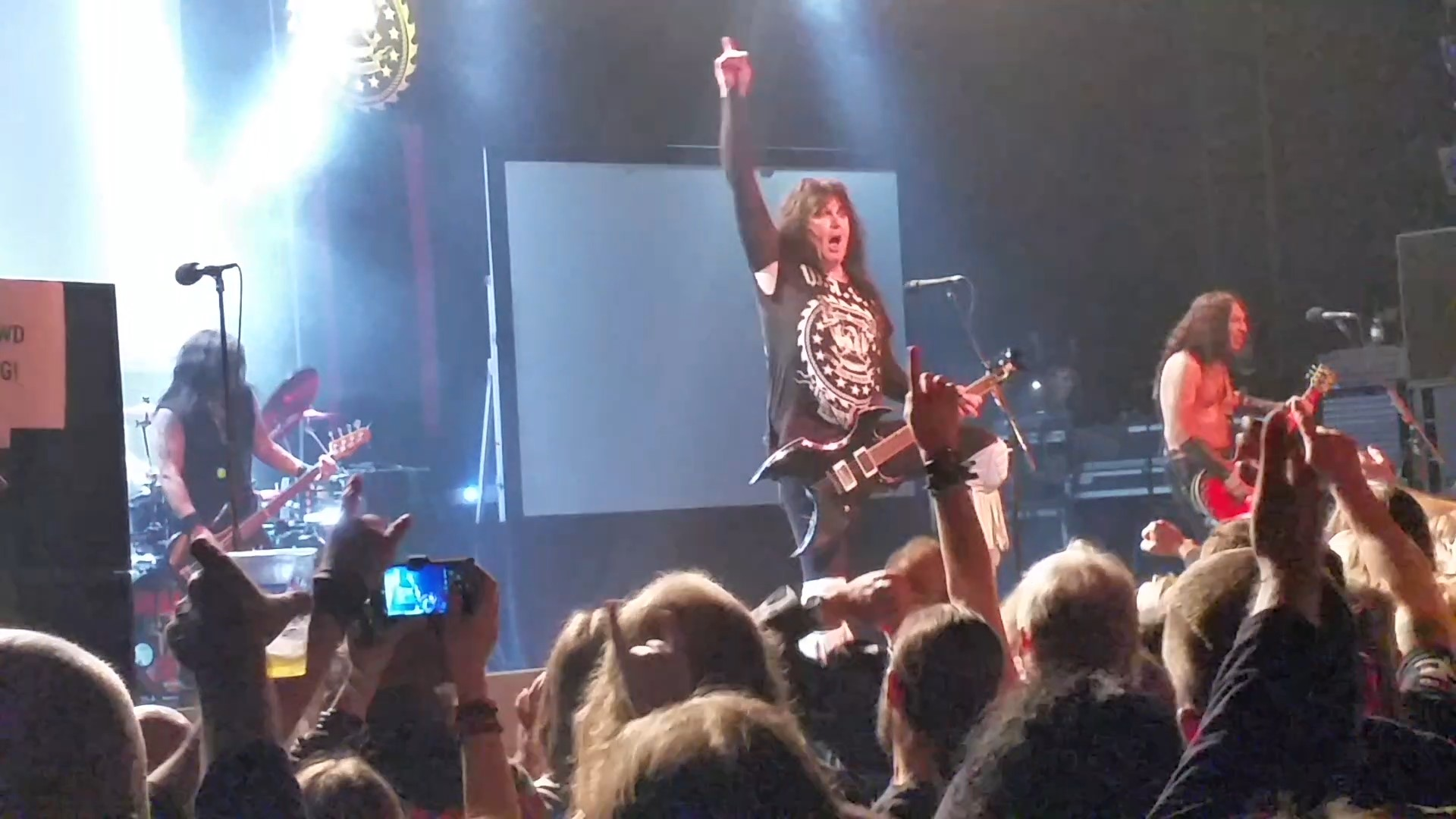
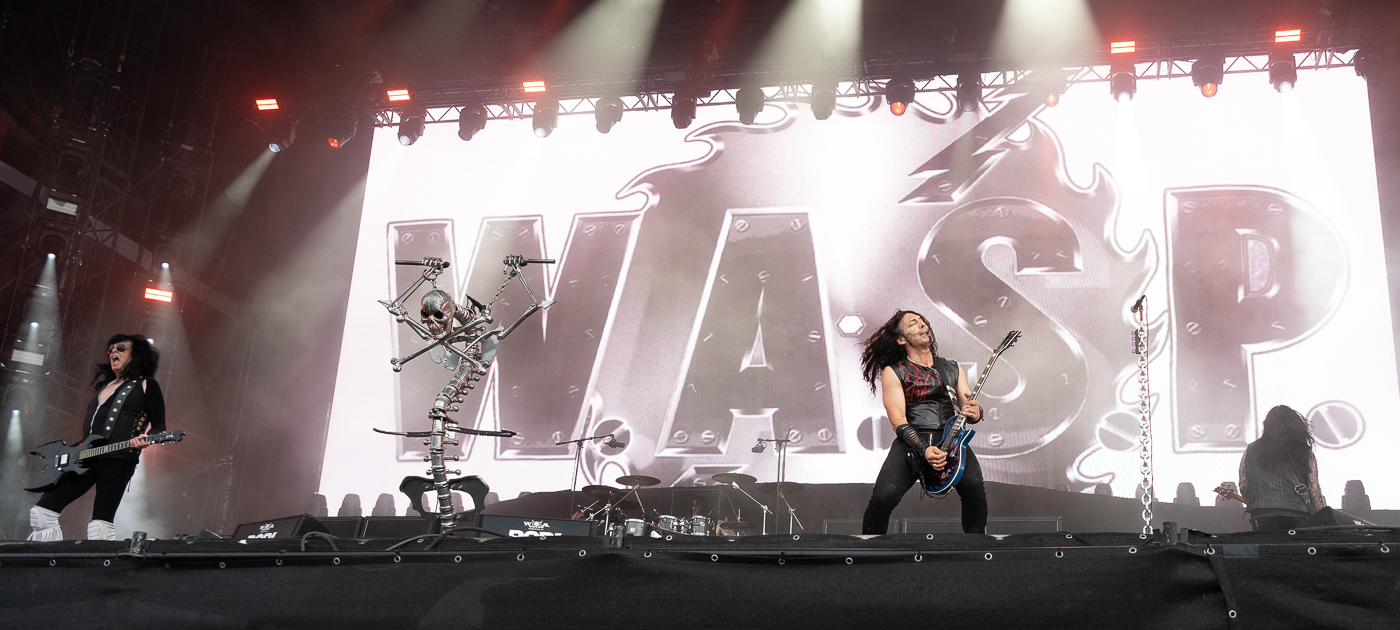
Members of W.A.S.P. performing in 2017 and 2025

W.A.S.P. is an American heavy metal band from Los Angeles, was formed on February 4, 1982. The group originally consisted of vocalist and rhythm guitarist Blackie Lawless (real name Steven Duren), lead guitarist William "Randy" Piper, bassist Rik Fox (real name Richard Suligowski) and drummer Tony Richards. By the time they recorded their debut album, Lawless had taken over on bass and Chris Holmes had joined on co-lead guitar. Lawless is the last remaining original member of the group, which currently also features lead guitarist Doug Blair (in 1992 and 2001, and since 2006), bassist Mike Duda (since 1995) and drummer Aquiles Priester (since 2017).

== History ==
=== 1982–1990 ===
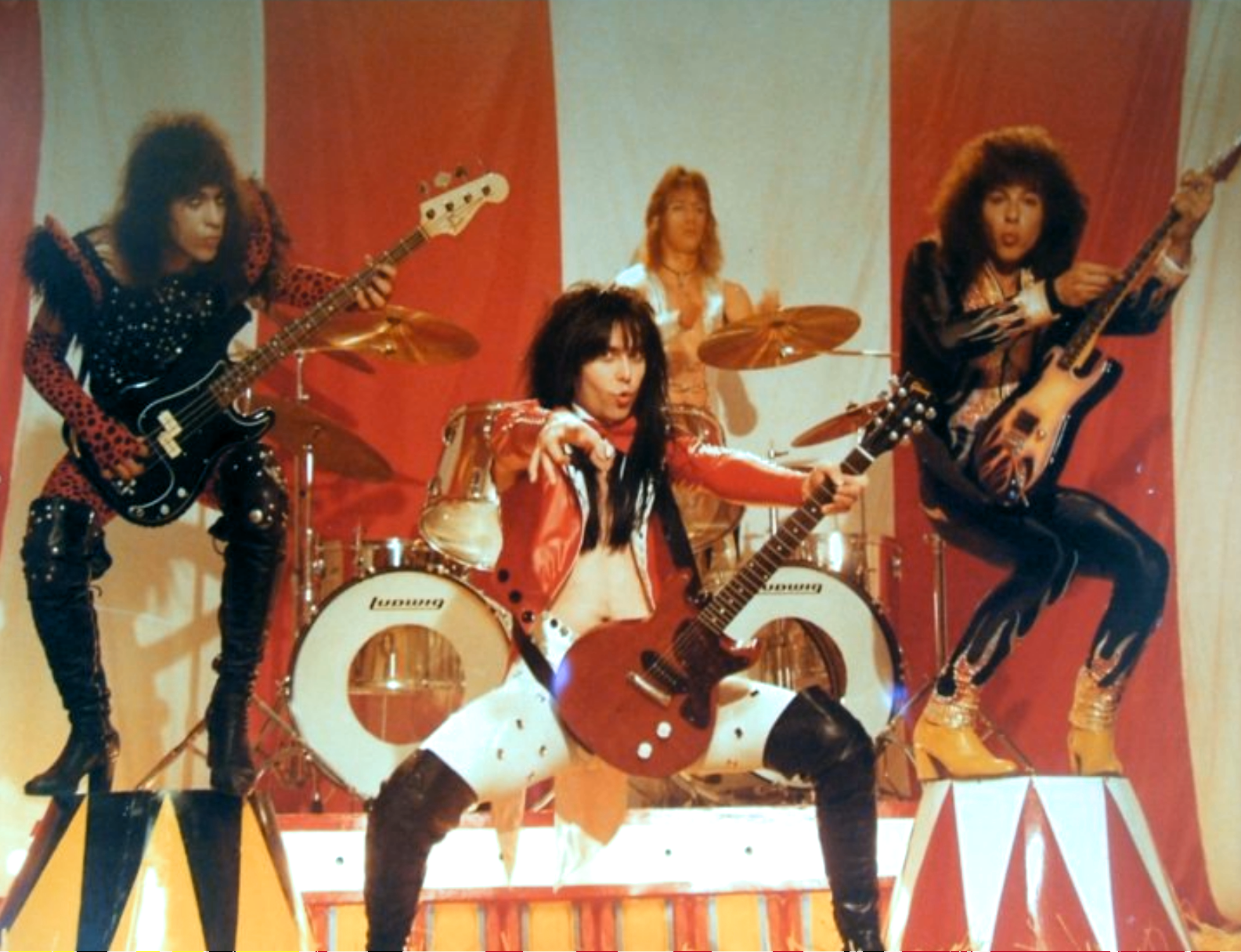
W.A.S.P. evolved from the earlier group Circus Circus, which Blackie Lawless and Randy Piper formed in 1979.

W.A.S.P. evolved from Circus Circus shortly after bassist Rik Fox's addition to the band in February 4, 1982. The group's original lineup also included lead vocalist/rhythm guitarist Blackie Lawless, lead guitarist Randy Piper and drummer Tony Richards. By "the end of May", Fox had been dismissed from the group and replaced by Richards' former Dante Fox bandmate Don Costa. Around the same time, Piper also left "for a few months". Towards the end of the year, Costa left to join Ozzy Osbourne's touring band, at which point Lawless decided to switch to bass and bring back Piper on guitar. He was also joined by Chris Holmes.

The band released its first single "Animal (F**k Like a Beast)" in April 1984. This was followed in August by their self-titled full-length debut. Shortly after the album's release, Richards was replaced by former Keel drummer Steve Riley. The group released The Last Command in 1985, before Piper left in July 1986. Lawless subsequently switched back to guitar, with Johnny Rod (real name John Julius Tumminello) leaving King Kobra to take over as bassist. Inside the Electric Circus followed in October, before Riley left during the subsequent tour to join L.A. Guns. He was replaced for future shows by a string of temporary substitutes.

By early 1988, W.A.S.P. had started working on its fourth studio album with Quiet Riot drummer Frankie Banali. By the time The Headless Children was released a year later, Banali had become a full-time member of the band. After a short tour, Holmes stepped back and eventually announced his departure from W.A.S.P. shortly after marrying Lita Ford in the summer of 1990; at the same time, the guitarist also claimed that both Rod and Banali had also departed.

=== 1990–2002 ===
After the departure of Chris Holmes, Blackie Lawless began recording The Crimson Idol with guitarist Bob Kulick and continuing drummer Frankie Banali. The album was intended to be released under the moniker "Blackie Lawless and W.A.S.P.", with the eponymous frontman performing vocals, bass and rhythm guitar. Banali recorded only half the album, before stepping back following his mother's death in November 1990. He was replaced by former Impellitteri drummer Stet Howland in January 1991. Upon the album's completion, a new touring lineup of Lawless, Howland, new guitarist Dan McCade and returning bassist Johnny Rod was announced for May and June shows. For a North American tour from July to November, McDade was replaced by Doug Blair.

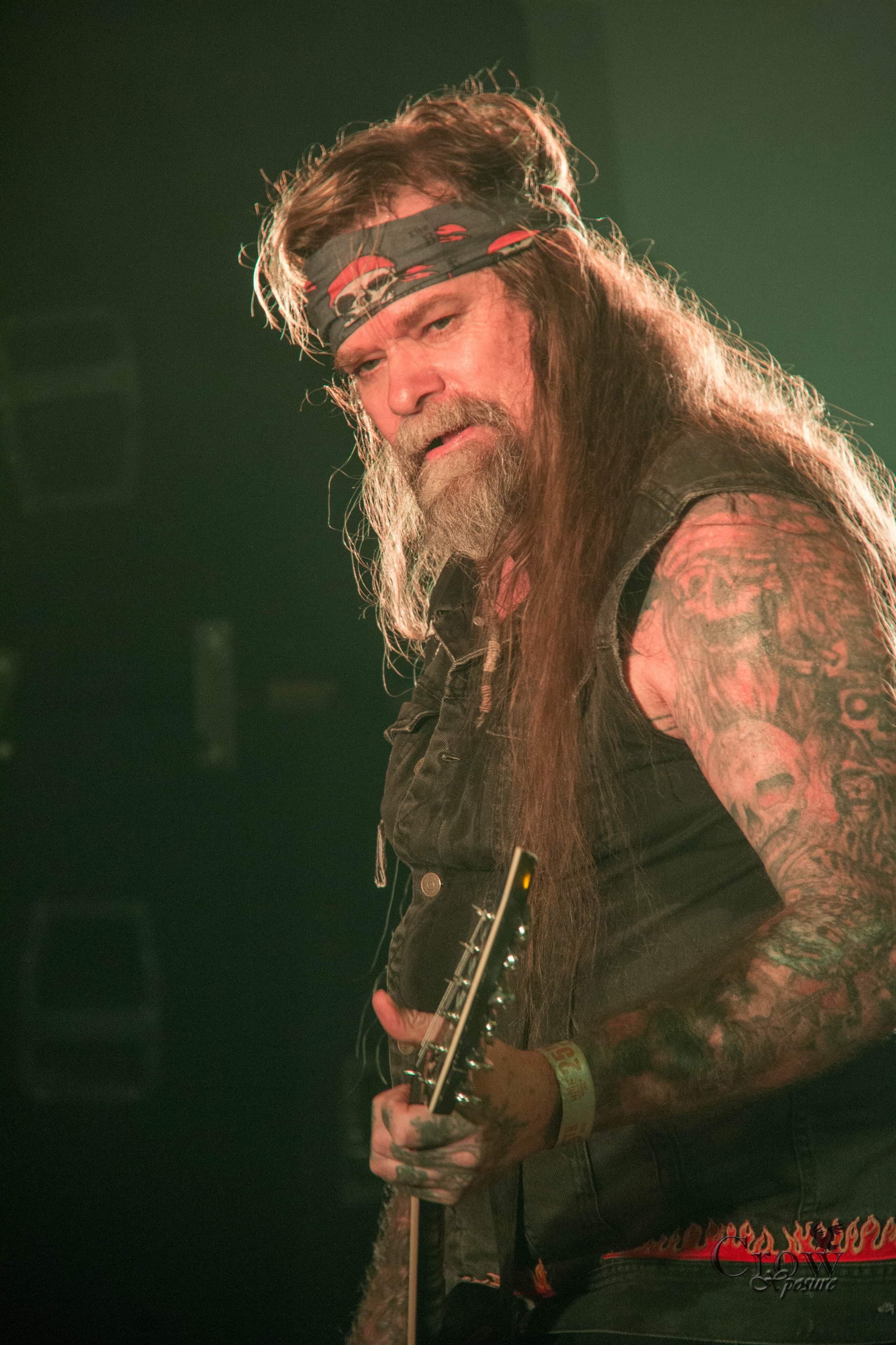
Lead guitarist Chris Holmes returned to W.A.S.P. in August 1995 after leaving five years earlier. He remained until 2001.

In September 1993, Lawless announced that he was disbanding W.A.S.P., with a final single "Sunset and Babylon" (recorded during The Crimson Idol sessions) to be released the following month. Throughout 1994, the frontman worked on a new album intended to be his solo debut. When it was eventually released in June 1995, however, Still Not Black Enough was credited to W.A.S.P. The album was not released outside of Japan and Europe until over a year later, when it was announced that Chris Holmes had returned to the band. When the follow-up Kill Fuck Die was released in April 1997, it was revealed that the guitarist and Lawless had been working together "under a blanket of fierce secrecy" since August 1995. The album also featured new bassist Mike Duda and returning drummer Stet Howland.

W.A.S.P.'s lineup remained stable for another four years, spawning one more studio album in Helldorado. During the recording of Unholy Terror, the band started working with drummer Frankie Banali again for certain sessions, as Howland was not available all the time. Shortly after the album's release in April 2001, rumours began to circulate that Holmes had left the band for a second time. His departure was later confirmed by Lawless in June, with Doug Blair temporarily returning to take his place on tour. At the end of July, the group announced former Tuff guitarist Darrell Roberts as Holmes' permanent replacement after months of rumours.

=== Since 2002 ===
Roberts debuted on 2002's Dying for the World, which was followed in 2004 by The Neon God: Part 1 – The Rise and Part 2 – The Demise in 2004, all of which featured Banali on drums alongside Howland. In February 2006, Stet Howland announced that he had left W.A.S.P. the previous month on amicable terms. He was replaced for a run of shows by Patrick Johansson. In April, Larry Howe was announced as Howland's replacement, however a week later the group's management replied that this was not an official appointment. At the same time, it was revealed that Roberts had also left W.A.S.P. A few weeks later, Mike "Spud" Dupke and former touring member Doug Blair were announced as the band's new drummer and lead guitarist, respectively, the latter succeeding the earlier appointment of Mark Zavon.

With Blair and Dupke, W.A.S.P. released Babylon in 2009 and Golgotha in 2015, before the drummer left in July 2015. Johansson returned to fulfil a run of shows, before former Annihilator drummer Randy Black took over in September. By August 2017, Black had been replaced by Aquiles Priester.

== Members ==
=== Current ===
Image	Name	Years active	Instruments	Release contributions
	Blackie Lawless (Steven Duren)	1982–1993; 1994–present	lead vocals; rhythm guitar (1982, since 1986); bass guitar (1982–86, 1990–95); keyboards (1990–92, since 2000)	all W.A.S.P. releases
	Doug Blair	2006–present (plus touring in 1992 and 2001)	lead guitar; backing vocals	all W.A.S.P. releases from Dominator (2007) onwards
	Mike Duda	1995–present	bass guitar; backing vocals	all W.A.S.P. releases from Kill Fuck Die (1997) onwards
	Aquiles Priester	2017–present	drums	none to date

=== Former ===
Image	Name	Years active	Instruments	Release contributions
	Tony Richards (Anthony Orlando)	1982–1984 (died 2026)	drums; backing vocals	"Animal (F**k Like a Beast)" (1984); W.A.S.P. (1984)
	William "Randy" Piper	1982; 1982–1986	lead guitar; backing vocals	"Animal (F**k Like a Beast)" (1984); W.A.S.P. (1984); Live at the Lyceum, London (1984); The Last Command (1985); Live... Animal (1987) – two tracks
	Rik Fox (Richard Suligowski)	1982	bass guitar	none
	Don Costa	1982 (died 2024)	bass guitar	none
	Brayden Parker	1982–1983	bass guitar	none
	Chris Holmes	1983–1990; 1995–2001	lead guitar	all W.A.S.P. releases from "Animal (F**k Like a Beast)" (1984) to The Headless Children (1989), and from Kill Fuck Die (1997) to Unholy Terror (2001)
	Steve Riley	1984–1987 (died 2023)	drums; backing vocals	all W.A.S.P. releases from Live at the Lyceum, London (1984) to Live... in the Raw (1987)
	Johnny Rod (John Julius Tumminello)	1986–1990; 1992–1993	bass guitar; backing vocals	Inside the Electric Circus (1986); Live... Animal (1987) – one track; Live... in the Raw (1987); The Headless Children (1989)
	Frankie Banali	1989–1990 (plus session in 1988–89, 1994–95, 2001–04 and 2017) (died 2020)	drums; percussion	The Headless Children (1989); The Crimson Idol (1992); "Sunset and Babylon" (1993); Still Not Black Enough (1995); Unholy Terror (2001); Dying for the World (2002); The Neon God: Part 1 – The Rise (2004); The Neon God: Part 2 – The Demise (2004); Reidolized: The Soundtrack to The Crimson Idol (2018) – one track only
	Stet Howland	1991–1993; 1995–2006	drums; percussion; backing vocals	The Crimson Idol (1992); all W.A.S.P. releases from Kill Fuck Die (1997) to Unholy Terror (2001); The Neon God: Part 1 – The Rise (2004) – one track only; The Neon God: Part 2 – The Demise (2004)
	Darrell Roberts	2001–2006	lead guitar; backing vocals	Dying for the World (2002); The Neon God: Part 1 – The Rise (2004); The Neon God: Part 2 – The Demise (2004); Dominator (2007) – one track only
	Mike "Spud" Dupke	2006–2015	drums	all W.A.S.P. releases from Dominator (2007) to Reidolized: The Soundtrack to The Crimson Idol (2018)
	Randy Black	2015–2017	drums	none

=== Backup ===
Image	Name	Years active	Instruments	Release contributions
	Chad Nelson	1987 (touring)	drums	Nelson was briefly the initial touring replacement for Steve Riley.
	Glenn Soderling	1987 (touring)	drums	Soderling took over from Nelson as the second touring drummer after Riley's departure.
	Kelly Martella	1987–1988 (touring)	drums	Martella was the third touring drummer after Riley left, until early 1988.
	Bob Kulick	1990–1992; 1994–1995 (both session) (died 2020)	lead guitar	After Chris Holmes left, Kulick performed on The Crimson Idol and Still Not Black Enough.
	Dan McDade	1992 (touring)	lead guitar	McDade played guitar on W.A.S.P.'s European tour in May/June 1992 after The Crimson Idol.
	Philip Wolfe	1992 (touring)	keyboards	Wolfe performed keyboards on the touring cycle for The Crimson Idol during 1992.
	Patrick Johansson	2006; 2015 (both touring)	drums	Johansson filled in after the departure of Stet Howland in 2006 and Mike Dupke in 2015.
	Brian Tichy	2018 (touring)	drums	Tichy filled in for Aquiles Priester, who was temporarily unavailable, for shows in 2018.

== Lineups ==
Period	Members	Releases
February – late May 1982	Blackie Lawless – lead vocals, rhythm guitar; Randy Piper – lead guitar, backing vocals; Rik Fox – bass guitar; Tony Richards – drums, backing vocals	none
Summer – late 1982	Blackie Lawless – lead vocals, guitars; Don Costa – bass guitar; Tony Richards – drums, backing vocals	none
Late 1982 – early 1983	Blackie Lawless – lead vocals, rhythm guitar; Randy Piper – lead guitar, backing vocals; Brayden Parker – bass guitar; Tony Richards – drums, backing vocals	none
Early 1983 – September 1984	Blackie Lawless – lead vocals, bass guitar; Randy Piper – guitars, backing vocals; Chris Holmes – guitars, backing vocals; Tony Richards – drums, backing vocals	"Animal (F**k Like a Beast)" (1984); W.A.S.P. (1984)
September 1984 – July 1986	Blackie Lawless – lead vocals, bass guitar; Randy Piper – guitars, backing vocals; Chris Holmes – guitars, backing vocals; Steve Riley – drums, backing vocals	Live at the Lyceum, London (1984); The Last Command (1985); Live... Animal (1987) – two tracks
July 1986 – spring 1987	Blackie Lawless – lead vocals, rhythm guitar; Chris Holmes – lead guitar, backing vocals; Johnny Rod – bass guitar, backing vocals; Steve Riley – drums, backing vocals	Inside the Electric Circus (1986); Live... Animal (1987) – one track; Live... in the Raw (1987)
Spring 1987	Blackie Lawless – lead vocals, rhythm guitar; Chris Holmes – lead guitar, backing vocals; Johnny Rod – bass guitar, backing vocals; Chad Nelson – drums (touring)	none
Spring – summer 1987	Blackie Lawless – lead vocals, rhythm guitar; Chris Holmes – lead guitar, backing vocals; Johnny Rod – bass guitar, backing vocals; Glenn Soderling – drums (touring)	none
Summer 1987 – early 1988	Blackie Lawless – lead vocals, rhythm guitar; Chris Holmes – lead guitar, backing vocals; Johnny Rod – bass guitar, backing vocals; Kelly Martella – drums (touring)	none
Early 1988 – April 1989	Blackie Lawless – lead vocals, rhythm guitar; Chris Holmes – lead guitar, backing vocals; Johnny Rod – bass guitar, backing vocals; Frankie Banali – drums, percussion (session)	The Headless Children (1989)
April 1989 – June 1990	Blackie Lawless – lead vocals, rhythm guitar; Chris Holmes – lead guitar, backing vocals; Johnny Rod – bass guitar, backing vocals; Frankie Banali – drums, percussion	none
June – November 1990	Blackie Lawless – lead vocals, rhythm guitar, bass guitar; Bob Kulick – lead guitar (session); Frankie Banali – drums, percussion	The Crimson Idol (1992); "Sunset and Babylon" (1993) (features Lawless and Banali only, with Lita Ford)
January 1991 – early 1992	Blackie Lawless – lead vocals, rhythm guitar, bass guitar; Bob Kulick – lead guitar (session); Stet Howland – drums, backing vocals	The Crimson Idol (1992); "Sunset and Babylon" (1993) (features Lawless and Banali only, with Lita Ford)
April – June 1992	Blackie Lawless – lead vocals, rhythm guitar; Dan McDade – lead guitar (touring); Johnny Rod – bass guitar, backing vocals; Stet Howland – drums, backing vocals	none
July – November 1992	Blackie Lawless – lead vocals, rhythm guitar; Doug Blair – lead guitar (touring); Johnny Rod – bass guitar, backing vocals; Stet Howland – drums, backing vocals	none
Band inactive November 1992 (officially disbanded September 1993) – 1994
1994–1995	Blackie Lawless – lead vocals, rhythm guitar, bass guitar; Bob Kulick – lead guitar (session); Frankie Banali – drums, percussion (session)	Still Not Black Enough (1995)
August 1995 – June 2001	Blackie Lawless – lead vocals, rhythm guitar; Chris Holmes – lead guitar, backing vocals; Mike Duda – bass guitar, backing vocals; Stet Howland – drums, backing vocals; Frankie Banali – drums (session, from 2001)	Kill Fuck Die (1997); Double Live Assassins (1998); Helldorado (1999); The Sting: Live at the Key Club L.A. (2000); Unholy Terror (2001)
June – July 2001	Blackie Lawless – lead vocals, rhythm guitar; Doug Blair – lead guitar, backing vocals (touring); Mike Duda – bass guitar, backing vocals; Stet Howland – drums, backing vocals; Frankie Banali – drums (session)	none
July 2001 – January 2006	Blackie Lawless – lead vocals, rhythm guitar; Darrell Roberts – lead guitar, backing vocals; Mike Duda – bass guitar, backing vocals; Stet Howland – drums, backing vocals; Frankie Banali – drums (session)	Dying for the World (2002); The Neon God: Part 1 – The Rise (2004); The Neon God: Part 2 – The Demise (2004)
February – March 2006	Blackie Lawless – lead vocals, rhythm guitar; Darrell Roberts – lead guitar, backing vocals; Mike Duda – bass guitar, backing vocals; Patrick Johansson – drums (touring)	Dominator (2007) – one track
May 2006 – July 2015	Blackie Lawless – lead vocals, rhythm guitar; Doug Blair – lead guitar, backing vocals; Mike Duda – bass guitar, backing vocals; Mike Dupke – drums	Dominator (2007) – remaining tracks; Babylon (2009); Golgotha (2015); Reidolized: The Soundtrack to The Crimson Idol (2018)
July – August 2015	Blackie Lawless – lead vocals, rhythm guitar; Doug Blair – lead guitar, backing vocals; Mike Duda – bass guitar, backing vocals; Patrick Johansson – drums (touring)	none
September 2015 – August 2017	Blackie Lawless – lead vocals, rhythm guitar; Doug Blair – lead guitar, backing vocals; Mike Duda – bass guitar, backing vocals; Randy Black – drums (touring)	none
August 2017 – present	Blackie Lawless – lead vocals, rhythm guitar; Doug Blair – lead guitar, backing vocals; Mike Duda – bass guitar, backing vocals; Aquiles Priester – drums	none to date
