= W.A.S.P. discography =

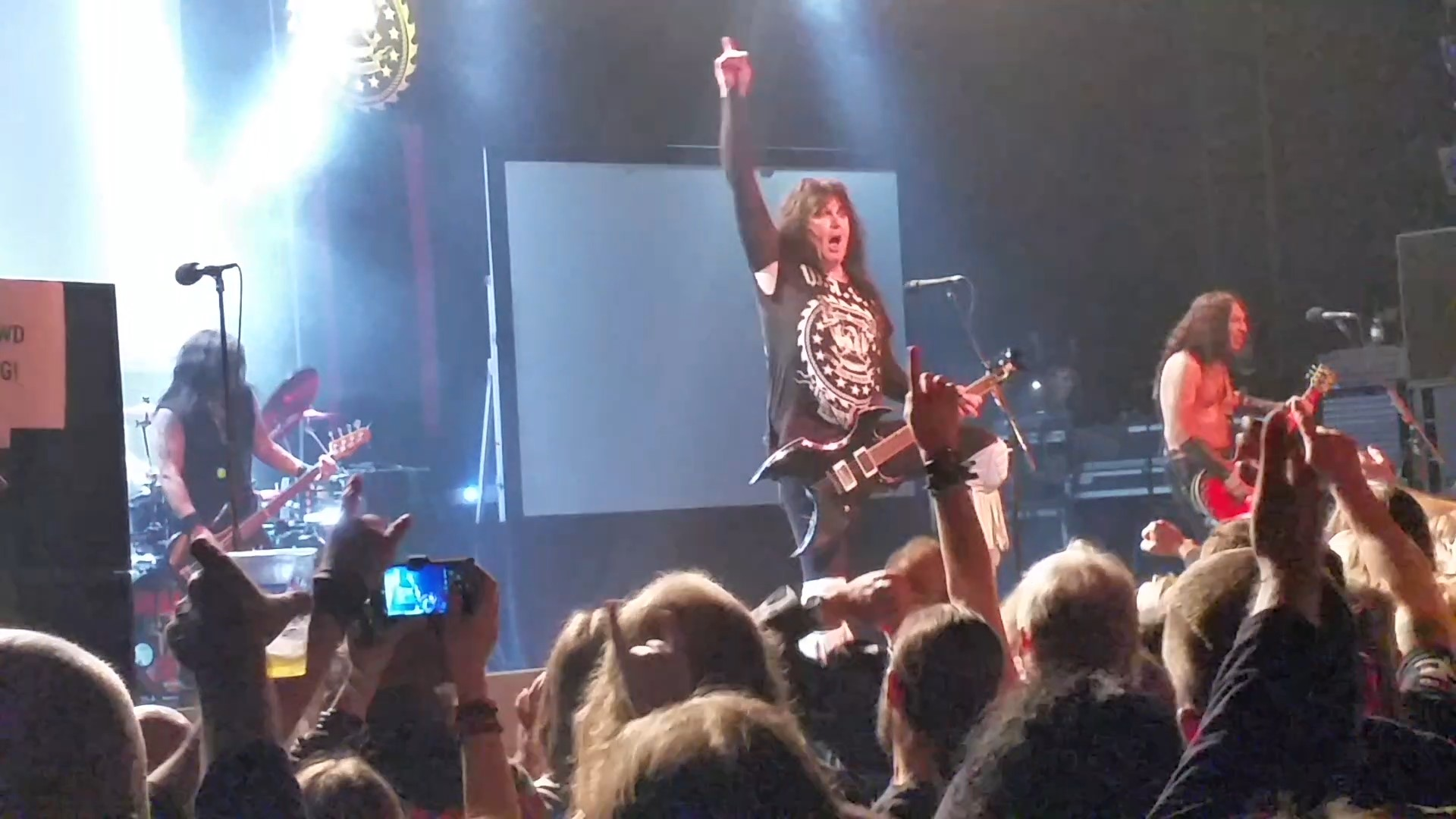
- Studio albums: 16
- Live albums: 3
- Compilation albums: 2
- Singles: 20
- Video albums: 4
- Music videos: 14

This is the discography of American heavy metal band W.A.S.P.

== Albums ==
=== Studio albums ===
| Title | Album details | Peak chart positions | | | | | | | | | | | Certifications |
| Title | Album details | US | AUS | JPN | AUT | CAN | FIN | GER | NOR | SWE | SWI | UK | Certifications |
|---|---|---|---|---|---|---|---|---|---|---|---|---|---|
| W.A.S.P. | Released: August 17, 1984; Label: Capitol; Formats: LP, MC | 74 | — | — | — | 56 | 8 | — | — | 15 | — | 51 | RIAA: Gold; MC: Gold; RIAJ: Gold |
| The Last Command | Released: October 25, 1985; Label: Capitol; Formats: LP, MC | 49 | 51 | — | — | 86 | 4 | 63 | 14 | 15 | — | 48 | RIAA: Gold; MC: Gold |
| Inside the Electric Circus | Released: October 1986; Label: Capitol; Formats: CD, LP, MC | 60 | 94 | — | — | 84 | 16 | — | 17 | 35 | — | 53 | |
| The Headless Children | Released: April 1989; Label: Capitol; Formats: CD, LP, MC | 48 | 55 | — | 19 | 76 | 18 | 22 | 13 | — | 19 | 8 | UK: Silver |
| The Crimson Idol | Released: June 1992; Label: Capitol; Formats: CD, LP, MC | — | 104 | 33 | 30 | — | — | 35 | 11 | 31 | 24 | 21 | |
| Still Not Black Enough | Released: June 10, 1995; Label: Victor, Raw Power/Castle; Formats: CD, LP, MC | — | — | — | — | — | — | — | — | 40 | — | 52 | |
| Kill Fuck Die | Released: March 5, 1997; Label: Victor, Raw Power/Castle; Formats: CD, MC | — | — | — | — | — | — | — | — | — | — | 94 | |
| Helldorado | Released: May 18, 1999; Label: Victor, CMC International; Formats: CD, MC | — | — | — | — | — | — | 59 | — | 49 | — | 111 | |
| Unholy Terror | Released: April 3, 2001; Label: Victor, Metal-is/Sanctuary; Formats: CD, MC | — | — | — | — | — | — | 88 | — | — | — | — | |
| Dying for the World | Released: June 11, 2002; Label: Victor, Metal-is/Sanctuary; Formats: CD, MC | — | — | — | — | — | — | 72 | — | — | — | — | |
| The Neon God: Part 1 – The Rise | Released: April 6, 2004; Label: Sanctuary, Noise; Formats: CD, MC | — | — | — | — | — | 26 | 87 | — | 26 | — | 150 | |
| The Neon God: Part 2 – The Demise | Released: September 28, 2004; Label: Sanctuary, Noise; Formats: CD | — | — | — | — | — | — | — | — | — | — | — | |
| Dominator | Released: April 16, 2007; Label: Demolition; Formats: CD, LP | — | — | — | — | — | 35 | 72 | 37 | 40 | — | — | |
| Babylon | Released: October 12, 2009; Label: Demolition; Formats: CD, LP | — | — | — | — | — | 31 | 61 | — | 24 | 54 | 135 | |
| Golgotha | Released: October 9, 2015; Label: Demolition; Formats: CD, 2xLP, digital download | — | — | — | 33 | — | 13 | 18 | 17 | 6 | 36 | 50 | |
| Reidolized: The Soundtrack to The Crimson Idol | Released: February 2, 2018; Label: Napalm; Formats: 2xCD, 2xLP, digital download | — | — | — | 26 | — | — | 17 | — | — | 31 | — | |
"—" denotes releases that did not chart or were not released in that territory.

=== Live albums ===
| Title | Album details | Peak chart positions | | | |
| Title | Album details | US | AUS | GER | UK |
|---|---|---|---|---|---|
| Live... in the Raw | Released: November 27, 1987; Label: Capitol; Formats: CD, LP, MC | 77 | 97 | 61 | 23 |
| Double Live Assassins | Released: February 24, 1998; Label: CMC International, Snapper Music; Formats: 2xCD, 2xMC | — | — | — | — |
| The Sting: Live at the Key Club L.A. | Released: November 28, 2000; Label: Apocalypse; Formats: CD | — | — | — | — |
"—" denotes releases that did not chart or were not released in that territory.

=== Compilation albums ===
| Title | Album details | Peak chart positions |
| Title | Album details | UK |
|---|---|---|
| First Blood Last Cuts | Released: October 1993; Label: Capitol; Formats: CD, 2xLP, MC | 69 |
| The Best of the Best 1984–2000 | Released: March 21, 2000; Label: Apocalypse, Snapper Music; Formats: CD; Released as a 2-CD set in 2007 | — |
"—" denotes releases that did not chart.

== Singles ==
| Title | Year | Peak chart positions | | | | | Album |
| Title | Year | AUS | FIN | IRE | NZ | UK | Album |
|---|---|---|---|---|---|---|---|
| "Animal (F**k Like a Beast)" | 1984 | — | — | — | — | 83 | Non-album single |
| "I Wanna Be Somebody" | 1984 | — | 18 | — | 30 | 77 | W.A.S.P. |
| "L.O.V.E. Machine" | 1984 | — | — | — | — | — | W.A.S.P. |
| "School Daze" | 1984 | — | 14 | — | — | 81 | W.A.S.P. |
| "Blind in Texas" | 1985 | — | 6 | — | — | 77 | The Last Command |
| "Wild Child" | 1986 | — | — | — | — | 71 | The Last Command |
| "9.5. – N.A.S.T.Y." | 1986 | — | 18 | — | — | 70 | Inside the Electric Circus |
| "Scream Until You Like It" | 1987 | — | — | — | — | 32 | Live... in the Raw |
| "I Don't Need No Doctor" | 1987 | — | — | 30 | — | 31 | Live... in the Raw |
| "Live Animal (F**k Like a Beast)" | 1988 | — | — | — | — | 61 | Non-album single |
| "Mean Man" | 1989 | — | 11 | 17 | — | 21 | The Headless Children |
| "The Real Me" | 1989 | — | — | 19 | — | 23 | The Headless Children |
| "Forever Free" | 1989 | 150 | — | — | — | 25 | The Headless Children |
| "Chainsaw Charlie (Murders in the New Morgue)" | 1992 | — | 3 | — | — | 17 | The Crimson Idol |
| "The Idol" | 1992 | 126 | — | — | — | 41 | The Crimson Idol |
| "Hold On to My Heart" | 1992 | — | — | — | — | — | The Crimson Idol |
| "I Am One" | 1992 | — | — | — | — | 56 | The Crimson Idol |
| "Sunset and Babylon" | 1993 | — | — | — | — | 38 | First Blood Last Cuts |
| "Black Forever"/"Goodbye America" | 1995 | — | — | — | — | 88 | Still Not Black Enough |
| "Kill Fuck Die" | 1997 | — | — | — | — | — | Kill Fuck Die |
"—" denotes releases that did not chart or were not released in that territory.

== Videography ==
=== Video albums ===
| Title | Album details |
|---|---|
| Live at the Lyceum, London | Released: 1984; Label: Sony, EMI; Formats: VHS, Betamax, LaserDisc |
| Videos... in the Raw | Released: 1988; Label: Picture Music International; Formats: VHS |
| First Blood Last Visions | Released: 1993; Label: Picture Music International; Formats: VHS, LaserDisc |
| The Sting: Live at the Key Club L.A. | Released: 2001; Label: Snapper Music; Formats: DVD, VHS |

=== Music videos ===
| Year | Title | Album |
|---|---|---|
| 1980 | "Mr. Cool" | As Circus Circus |
| 1984 | "I Wanna Be Somebody" | W.A.S.P. |
| 1984 | "L.O.V.E. Machine" | W.A.S.P. |
| 1985 | "Blind in Texas" | The Last Command |
| 1986 | "Wild Child" | The Last Command |
| 1987 | "Scream Until You Like It" | Live... in the Raw |
| 1987 | "I Don't Need No Doctor" | Live... in the Raw |
| 1987 | "The Manimal" | Live... in the Raw |
| 1989 | "The Real Me" | The Headless Children |
| 1989 | "Forever Free" | The Headless Children |
| 1992 | "The Idol" | The Crimson Idol |
| 1992 | "Hold On to My Heart" | The Crimson Idol |
| 1993 | "Arena of Pleasure" | The Crimson Idol |
| 1993 | "Sunset and Babylon" | First Blood Last Cuts |
| 1995 | "Black Forever" | Still Not Black Enough |
| 2009 | "Babylons Burning" | Babylon |
