= Helldorado (album) =

Studio album by W.A.S.P.
- Released: May 18, 1999
- Genre: Heavy metal
- Length: 41:50
- Label: CMC International; Victor (Japan)
- Producer: Blackie Lawless

W.A.S.P. chronology
Double Live Assassins (1998)	Helldorado (1999)	The Sting (2000)

Helldorado is the eighth studio album by American heavy metal band W.A.S.P., released in 1999. In a 2025 interview with eonmusic, Blackie Lawless said that the album's sound was a reaction to their previous release, Kill Fuck Die. "Helldorado was a rebellion, if you like, against what we had just gone through. It's like we don't want to go back to that place, we don't want to go back inside that pit, it's like; "we're out, we're going to have a celebration", and so that's really what Helldorado was; it was a celebration of getting your freedom back, getting your life back".

== Background ==
The album title is a coined word meant to evoke the image of a demonic automobile, and according to the band's central figure, Blackie Lawless, it is a play on the Cadillac Eldorado. In a 2001 interview, Lawless reflected on the musical direction of the album, stating that he "wanted to make a fun record" and that, because the previous album Kill Fuck Die had been "a really dark record," he wanted to create a contrast.

== Reception ==
Professional ratings
Review scores
Source	Rating
AllMusic	2/5 stars
Chronicles of Chaos	4/10
Metal Rules	3.5/5
Rock Hard	8.5/10

In Sweden, the album reached number 49 on the national chart, marking the band's first entry into the top 60 in four years since Still Not Black Enough (1995). In Germany, it reached number 59 on the album chart dated May 31, 1999, becoming their first top-100 entry in the country in seven years since The Crimson Idol (1992).

Steve Huey of AllMusic gave the album a rating of 2 out of 5, noting that although the band's sound had become somewhat heavier compared to their mid-to-late 1980s heyday, it remained unmistakably characteristic of them. A mini-review from CD Journal stated that this album sees the revival of W.A.S.P.'s relentless spirit alongside straightforward rock and roll.

== Track listing ==
All songs written by Blackie Lawless

No.	Title	Length
1.	"Drive By"	0:55
2.	"Helldorado"	5:05
3.	"Don't Cry (Just Suck)"	4:16
4.	"Damnation Angels"	6:27
5.	"Dirty Balls"	5:19
6.	"High on the Flames"	4:11
7.	"Cocaine Cowboys"	3:57
8.	"Can't Die Tonight"	4:04
9.	"Saturday Night Cockfight"	3:20
10.	"Hot Rods to Hell (Helldorado Reprise)"	4:15

=== Japanese edition bonus tracks ===
No.	Title	Length
11.	"Don't Cry (Just Suck)" (Karaoke Mix)	4:26
12.	"Dirty Balls" (Karaoke Mix)	5:35

== Personnel ==
W.A.S.P.

- Blackie Lawless – lead vocals, rhythm guitar, producer
- Chris Holmes – lead guitar
- Mike Duda – bass guitar, backing vocals
- Stet Howland – drums, backing vocals

Production

- Bill Metoyer – engineer
- Eddy Schreyer, Gene Grimaldi – mastering at Oasis Mastering, Burbank, California
- Roy Z – technical support
- Kosh and Paul Pierandozzi – art direction

== Charts ==
Chart (1999)	Peak position
German Albums (Offizielle Top 100)	59
Swedish Albums (Sverigetopplistan)	49
UK Rock & Metal Albums (OCC)	5
