= First Blood Last Cuts =

Compilation album by W.A.S.P.
- Released: October 1993
- Recorded: 1983–1993
- Genre: Heavy metal
- Length: 74:50
- Label: Capitol
- Producer: Blackie Lawless

W.A.S.P. chronology
The Crimson Idol (1992)	First Blood Last Cuts (1993)	Still Not Black Enough (1995)

Singles from First Blood Last Cuts
- 1. "Sunset and Babylon" Released: October 1993

Professional ratings
Review scores
Source	Rating
AllMusic	3/5 stars
Collector's Guide to Heavy Metal	5/10
Rock Hard	9.0/10

First Blood Last Cuts is the first compilation album by the American heavy metal band W.A.S.P. Released in October 1993, it was the first time the song "Animal (Fuck Like a Beast)", previously only released as a single in 1984, was released on an album. The album also included two new songs, "Sunset and Babylon" and "Rock and Roll to Death". "Rock and Roll to Death" was later released on 1995's Still Not Black Enough, with "Sunset and Babylon" remaining exclusive to this CD, while others songs were remixed for the album.

The compilation is the result of Blackie Lawless and W.A.S.P. leaving Capitol Records and was released as a contractual obligation with Capitol/EMI. According to Blackie Lawless, "Capitol had gotten to the point that they were no longer going to be the label that supported this kind of music."

== Track listing ==
All songs written by Blackie Lawless, except where noted.

No.	Title	Writer(s)	Length
1.	"Animal (Fuck Like a Beast)"		3:06
2.	"L.O.V.E. Machine" (remix)		3:54
3.	"I Wanna Be Somebody" (remix)		3:35
4.	"On Your Knees"		3:48
5.	"Blind in Texas" (remix)		4:22
6.	"Wild Child" (remix)	Chris Holmes, Blackie Lawless	5:10
7.	"I Don't Need No Doctor" (remix, Ray Charles cover)	Jo Armstead, Nick Ashford, Valerie Simpson	3:28
8.	"The Real Me" (The Who cover)	Pete Townshend	3:20
9.	"The Headless Children"		5:48
10.	"Mean Man"		4:52
11.	"Forever Free"		5:10
12.	"Chainsaw Charlie (Murders in the New Morgue)"		7:50
13.	"The Idol"		8:41
14.	"Sunset and Babylon" (previously unreleased)		3:34
15.	"Hold on to My Heart"		4:24
16.	"Rock and Roll to Death" (previously unreleased)		3:48
Total length:			74:50

- Track 1: Previously only available as a single, released Summer 1984
- Tracks 2, 3 & 4: From the debut album W.A.S.P., released August 8, 1984
- Tracks 5 & 6: From the album The Last Command, released November 9, 1985
- Track 7: From the album Inside the Electric Circus, released November 8, 1986
- Tracks 8, 9, 10, & 11: From the album The Headless Children, released April 15, 1989
- Tracks 12, 13 & 15: From the album The Crimson Idol, released June 8, 1992
- Tracks 14 & 16: Recorded exclusively for this album

== Charts ==
Chart (1993)	Peak position
UK Albums (OCC)	69
