= Chainsaw Charlie =

Chainsaw Charlie may be:

- "Chainsaw Charlie (Murders in the New Morgue)", a song by W.A.S.P. from their 1992 album The Crimson Idol
- Ring name of American professional wrestler Terry Funk
