= Babylon (W.A.S.P. album) =

Studio album by W.A.S.P.
- Released: October 12, 2009
- Recorded: 2009
- Genre: Heavy metal
- Length: 43:30
- Label: Demolition
- Producer: Blackie Lawless

W.A.S.P. chronology
Dominator (2007)	Babylon (2009)	Golgotha (2015)

Professional ratings
Review scores
Source	Rating
AllMusic	3.5/5 stars
Blabbermouth.net	7.5/10
Classic Rock	8/10 stars
Kerrang!	2/5
Metal Storm	9.0/10
Sleaze Roxx	4/5 stars

Babylon is the fourteenth studio album by American heavy metal band W.A.S.P., released on October 12, 2009. The album was inspired by biblical visions of "The Four Horsemen of the Apocalypse". The album contains covers of Deep Purple's "Burn" (originally recorded for W.A.S.P's previous album Dominator, but not used for unknown reasons) and Chuck Berry's "Promised Land". "Promised Land" was also covered in 1973 by Elvis Presley, and it was Elvis' version that the band had in mind as demonstrated by the ending comment "How about one of them peanut butter & banana sandwiches."

== Track listing ==
All music and lyrics by Blackie Lawless, except where noted.

No.	Title	Lyrics	Music	Length
1.	"Crazy"			5:10
2.	"Live to Die Another Day"			4:41
3.	"Babylon's Burning"			5:00
4.	"Burn"	David Coverdale	Ritchie Blackmore, Jon Lord, Coverdale, Ian Paice	4:50
5.	"Into the Fire"			5:54
6.	"Thunder Red"			4:20
7.	"Seas of Fire"			4:34
8.	"Godless Run"			5:43
9.	"Promised Land"	Chuck Berry	Berry	3:13

== Personnel ==
W.A.S.P.

- Blackie Lawless – lead vocals, rhythm & lead guitars, keyboards, producer
- Doug Blair – lead & rhythm guitars
- Mike Duda – bass, vocals
- Mike Dupke – drums, mixing assistant

Production

- Marc Moreau – engineer
- Logan Mader – mixing and mastering

== Charts ==
Chart (2009)	Peak position
Finnish Albums (Suomen virallinen lista)	31
German Albums (Offizielle Top 100)	61
Swedish Albums (Sverigetopplistan)	24
Swiss Albums (Schweizer Hitparade)	54
UK Independent Albums (OCC)	19
UK Rock & Metal Albums (OCC)	15
