= Golgotha (W.A.S.P. album) =

Studio album by W.A.S.P.
- Released: October 9, 2015
- Recorded: 2014
- Studios: Fort Apache Studio, Malibu, California; Stagg Street Studio, Los Angeles, California
- Genre: Heavy metal
- Length: 55:00
- Label: Napalm
- Producer: Blackie Lawless

W.A.S.P. chronology
Babylon (2009)	Golgotha (2015)	ReIdolized (The Soundtrack to the Crimson Idol) (2018)

Professional ratings
Review scores
Source	Rating
Blabbermouth.net	8.5/10
Metal Hammer (GER)	6/7
Rock Hard	9.0/10

Golgotha is the fifteenth studio album by American heavy metal band W.A.S.P. The album was released on October 2, 2015 through Napalm Records, and is W.A.S.P.'s first studio album since Babylon (2009), marking the longest gap between two studio albums in their career. Golgotha is also W.A.S.P.'s last studio album with drummer Mike Dupke, who left the band just prior to its release.

The word "Golgotha" is another name for "Calvary"— the site immediately outside Jerusalem's walls where Jesus was crucified.

== Track listing ==
All tracks are written by Blackie Lawless.

No.	Title	Length
1.	"Scream"	4:55
2.	"Last Runaway"	5:20
3.	"Shotgun"	6:08
4.	"Miss You"	7:42
5.	"Fallen Under"	4:57
6.	"Slaves of the New World Order"	7:45
7.	"Eyes of My Maker"	5:01
8.	"Hero of the World"	4:52
9.	"Golgotha"	7:37

Japanese edition bonus track
No.	Title	Length
10.	"Shotgun (Alternative)"	5:02
Total length:		59:23

== Personnel ==
W.A.S.P.

- Blackie Lawless – lead vocals, guitars, keyboards, producer
- Doug Blair – lead guitars, backing vocals
- Mike Duda – bass
- Michael Dupke – drums

Production

- Michael Dupke, Mark Zavon, Jun Murakawa – engineers
- Logan Mader – mixing

== Charts ==
Chart (2015)	Peak position
Austrian Albums (Ö3 Austria)	33
Belgian Albums (Ultratop Flanders)	92
Belgian Albums (Ultratop Wallonia)	52
Finnish Albums (Suomen virallinen lista)	13
French Albums (SNEP)	153
German Albums (Offizielle Top 100)	18
Japanese Albums (Oricon)	199
Norwegian Albums (VG-lista)	17
Scottish Albums (Official Charts)	40
Spanish Albums (Promusicae)	32
Swedish Albums (Sverigetopplistan)	6
Swiss Albums (Schweizer Hitparade)	36
UK Albums (Official Charts)	50
UK Independent Albums (Official Charts)	10
UK Rock & Metal Albums (Official Charts)	6
Top Hard Rock Albums (US)	5
Top Independent Albums (US)	9
Billboard 200 (US)	93
