= Frankie Banali =

American rock drummer (1951–2020)

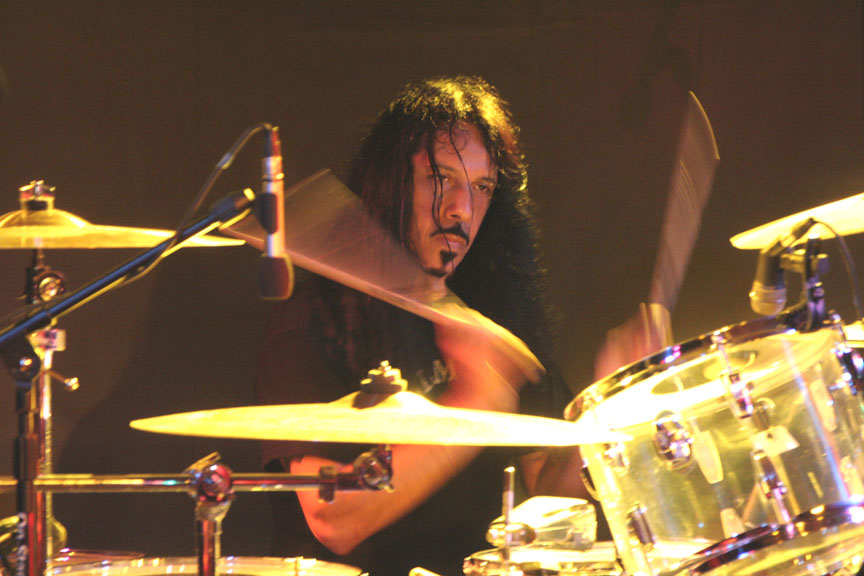
- Banali performing in 2010

Background information
- Born: Francesco Felice Banali; November 14, 1951; Queens, New York, U.S.
- Died: August 20, 2020 (aged 68) Los Angeles, California, U.S.
- Genres: Hard rock, heavy metal, instrumental rock
- Occupation: Musician
- Instruments: Drums, percussion
- Years active: 1975–2020
- Labels: Sony, Atlantic, Warner Bros., Pasha, RSM
- Website: quietriot.band

Francesco Felice Banali (November 14, 1951 – August 20, 2020) was an American rock drummer, most widely known for his work with heavy metal band Quiet Riot. His signature tone and iconic drum intros first became famous on their album Metal Health, which was the first metal album to hit number one on the Billboard charts and helped usher in the 80's metal band era. He had been the band's manager since 1993. He had also played the drums in the heavy metal band W.A.S.P., as well as with Billy Idol. Banali was briefly a touring drummer for Faster Pussycat and Steppenwolf. In the last few months of his life, he was also an inclined painter.

== Life and career ==
Banali was born on November 14, 1951, in Queens, New York City, New York, to Italian immigrants, Jack and Martha Banali. In 1975, he moved to Los Angeles, where he spent four years playing drums with various bands, including Steppenwolf with Nick St. Nicholas and Goldy McJohn. He was a very prolific session player and played on many hits for other artists including Billy Idol's Don't Stop 1981 EP that included the big hit "Mony Mony" and over 100 recordings. He also played drums on 2 tracks for the acclaimed "Hughes/Thrall" album with Glenn Hughes and Pat Thrall. In 1979, Banali, along with bassist Dana Strum, was in secret rehearsals with then Quiet Riot guitarist Randy Rhoads and Ozzy Osbourne as the latter was looking for a guitar player to launch a new band. In 1980, he joined forces with Kevin DuBrow and formed DuBrow with a revolving door of musicians, before settling with former Snow guitarist Carlos Cavazo and bassist Chuck Wright. After Rudy Sarzo replaced Wright, DuBrow changed the name of the group to Quiet Riot (which was the same name of the band that DuBrow, Sarzo and Randy Rhoads had used prior to Sarzo and Rhoads leaving to join Ozzy Osbourne's band). After signing with Pasha Records in September 1982, Banali and Quiet Riot found success with Metal Health, which was released six months after signing their deal with Pasha Records. In November 1983, only eight months after its release, Metal Health reached the #1 spot on the Billboard 200 charts (replacing the Police's Synchronicity), making it the first heavy metal album to go #1 on the charts. Metal Health eventually sold over 10 million copies worldwide and help usher in the decade of heavy metal hair rock.

By the time Condition Critical was released in July 1984, tensions began to slowly break Quiet Riot apart, but Banali held on, through lineup changes and a diminishing fan base (mostly caused by Kevin DuBrow's erratic behavior). By 1989, Quiet Riot disbanded after touring in support of their self-titled album, which was released in October 1988. Around the time of recording their self-titled album, he also played drums for W.A.S.P.'s The Headless Children album. After Quiet Riot disbanded, he rejoined W.A.S.P. to tour in support of the album. In 1990, Banali was called in by Faster Pussycat to replace the fired Mark Michals, during their tour in support of their 1989 album Wake Me When It's Over. After his mother's death in November 1990, Banali regrouped and formed a band called Heavy Bones with guitarist Gary Hoey. They released only one album in 1992, before disbanding. In 1993, Banali rejoined Quiet Riot after Bobby Rondinelli left the band to join Black Sabbath. In 1994, he also took over as the band's manager, overseeing the band's business decisions. After three albums and more lineup changes (including the reunion of the classic Metal Health lineup from 1997 onwards), Quiet Riot disbanded in 2003. Banali and DuBrow reformed Quiet Riot in October 2004 with bassist Chuck Wright and new guitarist Alex Grossi. They released one album with the lineup, Rehab in 2006, before the untimely death of DuBrow in November 2007. Banali announced the dissolving of Quiet Riot on January 14, 2008.

It would not be until September 2010 that Banali (with the blessing of Kevin DuBrow's family) reformed Quiet Riot with Wright and Grossi. They originally hired Mark Huff, but he was let go in January 2012. While Keith St. John came in to fulfill the tour dates, they hired Scott Vokoun in March 2012. In November 2013, Vokoun left and was replaced by Jizzy Pearl. And in June 2014, Quiet Riot released 10, their first album in eight years. In mid-2010, Banali had an online fundraiser via Kickstarter with his then fiancé Regina Russell Banali for the seed money for production of a documentary about the band, titled Quiet Riot - Well Now You're Here There's No Way Back, a film she both produced and directed. The final amount raised was nearly $24,000, The film premiered at the Newport Beach Film Festival on April 29, 2014.

On January 18, 2017, Frankie was inducted into the Metal Hall of Fame for his contribution to Heavy Metal drums.

Banali was interviewed for the 2020 book, BONZO: 30 Rock Drummers Remember the Legendary John Bonham, by author Greg Prato.

== Influences ==
Frankie Banali's main influences include John Bonham (rock drumming) and Buddy Rich, (traditional Jazz drumming). For standard drumming his influences were Simon Phillips, Dennis Chambers, and Vinnie Colaiuta, just to name a few

== Personal life and death ==
Frankie's father, Jack, died from pancreatic cancer in 1974. Frankie's mother, Martha, died after an eight-year battle with breast cancer, on November 14, 1990, Frankie's 39th birthday.

Frankie married his first wife, Karen (born 1969), in 1994. On February 17, 1997, his daughter, Ashley, was born. On April 14, 2009, Karen died from heart failure at the age of 40.

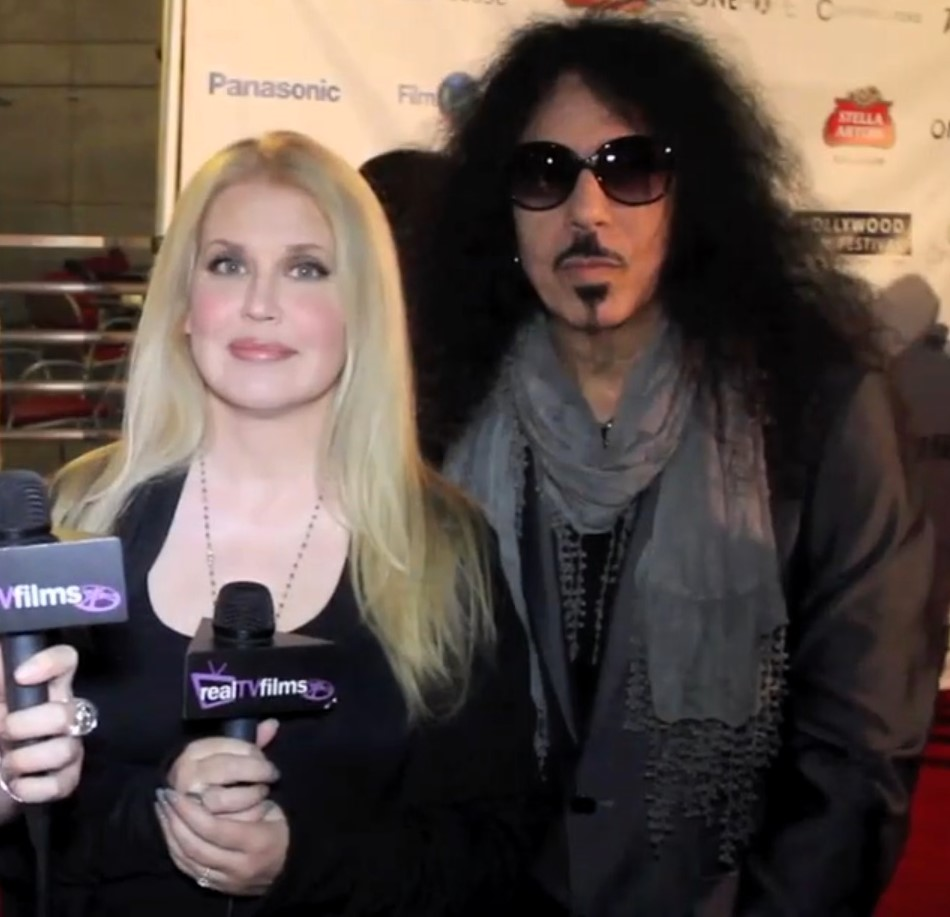
Banali (right) with Regina Russell in 2014

On November 11, 2015, Frankie married his second wife Regina Russell Banali, who produced and directed a documentary about Quiet Riot called Quiet Riot: Well Now You're Here, There's No Way Back.

In October 2019, Banali revealed that he was diagnosed with stage-IV pancreatic cancer on April 17. He died from the disease on August 20, 2020, at age 68. This left Banali as the second member of the classic Metal Health-era Quiet Riot lineup to have died, following Kevin DuBrow in November 2007. It was announced three weeks after Banali's death that Quiet Riot would continue at his request, and he was replaced by Johnny Kelly.

On September 4, 2020, as a result of a fan-led petition, MTV Classic on their Metal Mayem show, which aired every Friday evening from 9 PM to 1 AM EST, aired a rock block of Quiet Riot videos to honor Frankie. The block started at the beginning of the show and included these 6 videos: "Party all Night", "Twilight Hotel", "The Wild and the Young", "Bang Your Head (Metal Health)", "Mama Weer All Crazee Now", and "Cum On Feel the Noize". At the beginning of each video text in blue and white scrolled in from the right and lasted a few seconds saying "In Memory of Frankie Banali, 1951-2020". The block lasted 37 minutes which included commercials between the third and fourth videos.

== Partial discography (as a member of bands) ==
=== With Billy Idol ===
- Don't Stop EP (1981) (tracks 1–3)

=== Vic Vergeat Band ===
- Vic Vergeat Band (1982)

=== With Hughes/Thrall ===
- Hughes/Thrall (1982) (tracks 6 & 9)

=== With Billy Thorpe ===
- East of Eden's Gate (1982)

=== With Quiet Riot ===
- Metal Health (1983)
- Condition Critical (1984)
- QR III (1986)
- QR (1988)
- Terrified (1993)
- Down to the Bone (1995)
- Alive and Well (1999)
- Guilty Pleasures (2001)
- Rehab (2006)
- Quiet Riot 10 (2014)
- Road Rage (2017)
- Hollywood Cowboys (2019)

=== With Hear 'N Aid ===
- Hear 'n Aid – "Stars" (1986)

=== With Kuni ===
- Masque (1986)

=== With Alex Masi ===
- Attack of the Neon Shark (1989)

=== With W.A.S.P. ===
- The Headless Children (1989)
- The Crimson Idol (1992)
- Still Not Black Enough (1995)
- Unholy Terror (2001)
- Dying for the World (2002)
- The Neon God: Part 1 - The Rise (2004)
- The Neon God: Part 2 – The Demise (2004)
- Re-Idolized (Soundtrack to the Crimson Idol) (2018)

=== With Heavy Bones ===
- Heavy Bones (1992)

=== With Blackthorne ===
- Afterlife (1993)

=== With Julliet ===
- Passion (2002)
