= Darrell Roberts =

American guitarist

- Born: June 22, 1974 (age 52); Dayton, Ohio, U.S.
- Genres: Heavy metal; groove metal; thrash metal; alternative metal; hard rock; shock rock
- Occupation: Guitarist
- Member of: Sintanic
- Formerly of: Five Finger Death Punch; W.A.S.P.; Tuff

Darrell Roberts (born June 22, 1974) is an American guitarist best known as a former member of the heavy metal bands W.A.S.P. and Five Finger Death Punch.

== Career ==
In 2002, Roberts debuted as a member of the heavy metal band W.A.S.P. In 2005, he left the band and went on to join Las Vegas based heavy metal band Five Finger Death Punch. Roberts left FFDP in 2009 and was replaced by Jason Hook. In late 2009, he started a new band under the name Sintanic with former Murderdolls drummer Ben Graves.

== Discography ==
=== Tuff ===
- History of Tuff (2001) – guitarist on "American Hairband"

=== W.A.S.P. ===
- Dying for the World (2002)
- The Neon God: Part 1 – The Rise (2004)
- The Neon God: Part 2 – The Demise (2004)
- Dominator (2007) – song: "Deal with the Devil"

=== Five Finger Death Punch ===
- The Way of the Fist (2007)
