= Unholy Terror =

Studio album by W.A.S.P.
- Released: April 3, 2001
- Recorded: 2000
- Genre: Heavy metal
- Length: 47:15
- Label: Metal-Is/Sanctuary; Victor (Japan)
- Producer: Blackie Lawless

W.A.S.P. chronology
The Sting (2000)	Unholy Terror (2001)	Dying for the World (2002)

Professional ratings
Review scores
Source	Rating
AllMusic	2.5/5 stars
Chronicles of Chaos	7/10
Metal Crypt	3.75/5
Metal Rules	4.0/5
Rock Hard	7.0/10

Unholy Terror is the ninth studio album by the American heavy metal band W.A.S.P., released in 2001. It is viewed by many fans and critics alike as an 'issue' album, going into great detail about the world and all its vices. This is the last album to feature longtime guitarist Chris Holmes.

== Track listing ==
All tracks are written by Blackie Lawless.

No.	Title	Length
1.	"Let It Roar"	4:40
2.	"Hate to Love Me"	4:07
3.	"Loco-Motive Man (And the Killer Babies)"	6:03
4.	"Unholy Terror"	2:01
5.	"Charisma"	5:25
6.	"Who Slayed Baby Jane?"	4:55
7.	"Euphoria"	3:19
8.	"Raven Heart"	3:46
9.	"Evermore"	6:10
10.	"Wasted White Boys"	6:49

Japanese CD bonus track
No.	Title	Length
11.	"Hate to Love Me" (Karaoke Mix)	4:07

== Personnel ==
W.A.S.P.

- Blackie Lawless – vocals, guitars, keyboards, producer
- Chris Holmes – lead guitar
- Mike Duda – bass, vocals
- Stet Howland – drums, vocals

Guest musicians

- Frankie Banali – drums (on tracks 2, 3, 5, 8 and 10)
- Roy Z – lead guitar (on tracks 6 and 10)
- Valentina – chorus (on track 6)

Production

- BIll Metoyer – engineer
- Dan Biechele – assistant engineer and production manager
- Richard Kaplan, Chuck Johnson – mixing at Indigo Ranch, Malibu, California
- Tom Baker – mastering at Precision Mastering
- Kosh – album design

== Charts ==
Chart (2001)	Peak position
German Albums (Offizielle Top 100)	88
UK Independent Albums (OCC)	48
UK Rock & Metal Albums (OCC)	31
