= The Neon God: Part 1 – The Rise =

Studio album by W.A.S.P.
- Released: April 6, 2004
- Genre: Heavy metal
- Length: 49:14
- Label: Noise/Sanctuary
- Producer: Blackie Lawless

W.A.S.P. chronology
Dying for the World (2002)	The Neon God: Part 1 – The Rise (2004)	The Neon God: Part 2 – The Demise (2004)

Professional ratings
Review scores
Source	Rating
AllMusic	3/5 stars
Brave Words & Bloody Knuckles	7.5/10
KNAC	2.5/5 stars
Metal Rules	4.7/5
Rock Hard	6.0/10

The Neon God: Part 1 – The Rise, is the eleventh studio album and the first act of a two-part rock opera by the American heavy metal band W.A.S.P. The songs on the album narrate the story of an abused and orphaned boy named Jesse, who finds that he has the ability to read and manipulate people. The second part was released on the album titled The Neon God: Part 2 – The Demise.

== Track listing ==
All tracks are written by Blackie Lawless.

No.	Title	Length
1.	"Overture"	3:33
2.	"Why Am I Here"	0:34
3.	"Wishing Well"	3:34
4.	"Sister Sadie (And the Black Habits)"	7:42
5.	"The Rise"	2:29
6.	"Why Am I Nothing"	0:58
7.	"Asylum #9"	6:19
8.	"The Red Room of the Rising Sun"	4:41
9.	"What I'll Never Find"	6:02
10.	"Someone to Love Me"	0:51
11.	"X.T.C. Riders"	4:34
12.	"Me & the Devil"	0:53
13.	"The Running Man"	4:19
14.	"Raging Storm"	5:45

== Personnel ==
W.A.S.P.

- Blackie Lawless – vocals, guitars, bass, keyboards, drums, producer
- Darrell Roberts – lead guitar, vocals, drums
- Mike Duda – bass, vocals
- Frankie Banali – drums, percussion
- Stet Howland – drums (track 3)

Production

- Wesley M. Seidman – mixing
- Tom Baker – mastering
- Kosh – art direction and design

== Charts ==
Chart (2004)	Peak position
Finnish Albums (Suomen virallinen lista)	26
French Albums (SNEP)	176
German Albums (Offizielle Top 100)	87
Swedish Albums (Sverigetopplistan)	26
UK Independent Albums (OCC)	16
UK Rock & Metal Albums (OCC)	14
