= Dying for the World =

Studio album by W.A.S.P.
- Released: June 11, 2002
- Studios: Fort Apache Recording Studio, Hollywood, California
- Genre: Heavy metal
- Length: 50:38
- Labels: Metal-Is/Sanctuary; Victor (Japan)
- Producer: Blackie Lawless

W.A.S.P. chronology
| Unholy Terror (2001) | Dying for the World (2002) | The Neon God: Part 1 – The Rise (2004) |

Professional ratings
Review scores
| Source | Rating |
|---|---|
| AllMusic | 4/5 stars |
| KNAC | 3.5/5 stars |
| Metal Rules | 4.5/5 |
| Rock Hard | 7.5/10 |

Dying for the World is the tenth studio album by the American heavy metal band W.A.S.P., released in 2002. Dying for the World is one of the band's darkest albums, and was Blackie Lawless' dedication to all those who perished in the attacks of the 9/11 events, especially heard on the "Hallowed Ground" track.

The album was written and recorded in less than a year. This is very unusual as Blackie Lawless is a perfectionist, normally taking 2 years or more to finish an album and have it recorded.

== Track listing ==
All tracks are written by Blackie Lawless.

| No. | Title | Length |
|---|---|---|
| 1. | "Shadow Man" | 5:34 |
| 2. | "My Wicked Heart" | 5:38 |
| 3. | "Black Bone Torso" | 2:15 |
| 4. | "Hell for Eternity" | 4:38 |
| 5. | "Hallowed Ground" | 5:54 |
| 6. | "Revengeance" | 5:20 |
| 7. | "Trail of Tears" | 5:50 |
| 8. | "Stone Cold Killers" | 4:56 |
| 9. | "Rubber Man" | 4:25 |
| 10. | "Hallowed Ground" (Take #5 Acoustic) | 6:08 |

Japanese CD bonus tracks
| No. | Title | Length |
|---|---|---|
| 11. | "Revengeance" (Karaoke Version) | 5:21 |
| 12. | "Trail of Tears" (Take #1) | 5:04 |
| 13. | "Hallowed Ground" (Take #2) | 5:19 |

== Personnel ==
W.A.S.P.

- Blackie Lawless – guitar, vocals, keyboards
- Darrell Roberts – guitar
- Mike Duda – bass, vocals
- Frankie Banali – drums

Production

- Bill Metoyer – engineer, mixing
- Dan Biechele – assistant engineer and production manager
- Joe Delaney (a.k.a. Joetown) – additional mixing on tracks 2 and 5
- Tom Baker – mastering at Precision Mastering
- Kosh – album design

== Charts ==
| Chart (2002) | Peak position |
|---|---|
| German Albums (Offizielle Top 100) | 72 |
| UK Rock & Metal Albums (Official Charts) | 39 |
