= W.A.S.P. (band) =

American heavy metal band

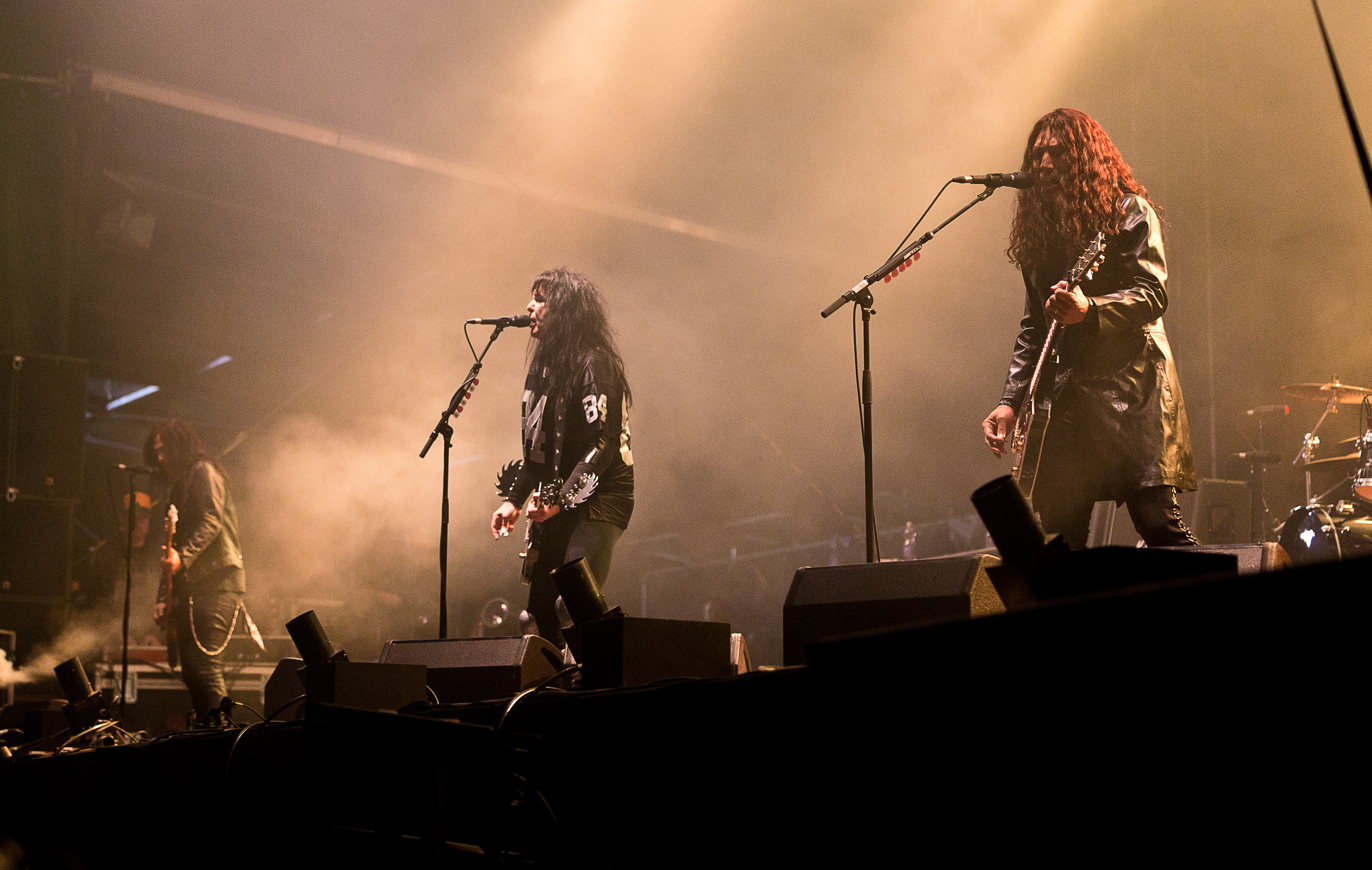
- W.A.S.P. performing in 2015

Background information
- Origin: Los Angeles, California, U.S.
- Genres: Heavy metal; glam metal; shock rock
- Works: Discography
- Years active: 1982–present
- Labels: Demolition; Capitol; CMC International; Napalm
- Spinoff of: Circus Circus
- Members: Blackie Lawless; Doug Blair; Mike Duda; Aquiles Priester
- Past members: See List of former W.A.S.P. members
- Website: waspnation.com

W.A.S.P. is an American heavy metal band formed in Los Angeles, California in 1982. The band is considered to be an integral part of the early Sunset Strip scene of hard rock and glam metal, and they became recognized for their shock rock-themed image, lyrics and live performances. The band has sold over 12 million records worldwide, with their first two full-length studio albums, W.A.S.P. (1984) and The Last Command (1985), being certified as gold by the RIAA.

W.A.S.P. was a target in the mid-1980s by the Parents Music Resource Center (PMRC), an organization that pushed for warning labels on recorded music. The band immortalized its fight with the PMRC on the song "Harder, Faster" from their 1987 live album, Live... in the Raw. Their most popular songs include "Animal (F**k Like a Beast)", "I Wanna Be Somebody", "L.O.V.E. Machine", "Wild Child", "Blind in Texas", "Forever Free", "The Headless Children", "Chainsaw Charlie (Murders in the New Morgue)" and "The Idol", as well as their cover versions of Ray Charles' "I Don't Need No Doctor" and The Who's "The Real Me". The band's most recent studio album, Golgotha, was released in 2015 and they are currently working on new material.

In 2020, Jeff Mezydlo of Yardbarker included W.A.S.P. in his list of "the 20 greatest hair metal bands of all time".

== History ==
=== Early years and rise to fame (1982–1985) ===
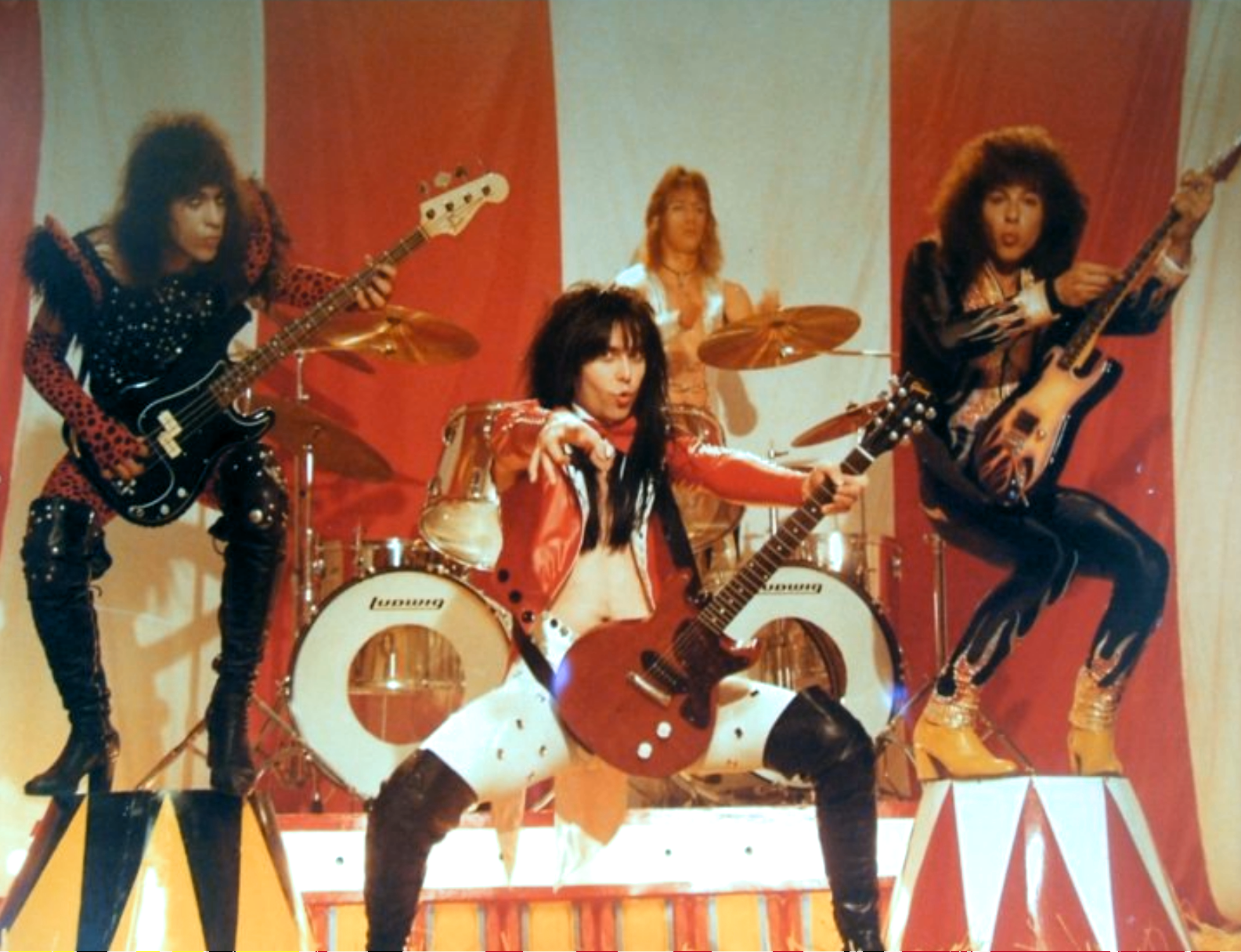
Circus Circus 1979–1980: Joey Palermo, Blackie Lawless, Jimi Image and Randy Piper

The band's origins date to 1977 when Randy Piper joined Blackie Lawless's band Sister. That band later changed its name to Circus Circus, which rehearsed at Piper's Magnum Opus Studios in Buena Park, California. After various lineup changes, Circus Circus evolved into W.A.S.P., which launched in 1982 in Los Angeles with Lawless, Piper, Rik Fox, and Tony Richards. The band became notorious for its raunchy and, at times, shocking live shows. Lawless was known to tie semi-naked models to a torture rack, and to also hurl raw meat into the audience. The band's debut single, entitled "Animal (F**k Like a Beast)", and its cover were equally controversial.

The first lineup did not last for long, as Fox was let go and went on to join the band Steeler with vocalist Ron Keel and a then-unknown guitarist Yngwie Malmsteen. He was replaced by Don Costa, the bassist in Richards' former band, Dante Fox (which later evolved into Great White). Shortly afterward, Costa also left the band and his position on the bass was filled by Brayden Parker. In 1983, guitarist Chris Holmes joined the band; after Parker left, Lawless switched to playing bass.

In September 2023, Ratt frontman Stephen Pearcy told AXS TV that only a small number of bands had "really kickstarted things" on the Sunset Strip, naming Roxx Regime (later Stryper), Dante Fox (later Great White), W.A.S.P., Quiet Riot, Mötley Crüe, and Ratt as the core group.

W.A.S.P. signed to Capitol Records for their debut album, W.A.S.P., released on August 17, 1984. The debut was at one time planned for release with the title Winged Assassins. The band's first single, "Animal (F**k Like a Beast)", was omitted from the album in the United States to prevent it from being banned from major chain stores. W.A.S.P. was accompanied by the band's first world tour, performing with numerous bands such as Kiss, Iron Maiden, Dokken, Krokus, Helix, Quiet Riot, Armored Saint, and a then-relatively unknown Metallica.

Shortly afterwards, the band made an appearance in the 1984 film The Dungeonmaster and on the soundtrack to Ghost Warrior with the song "Tormentor".

"L.O.V.E. Machine" and "I Wanna Be Somebody" helped the album sell, and set the band up for "Blind in Texas", a song written in St. Paul, Minnesota, by Lawless. The song was included on their next album The Last Command, which was released in October 1985. The Last Command remains W.A.S.P.'s highest-charting album, peaking at No. 47 on the Billboard album chart. "Blind in Texas" is perhaps their best known song, more than four decades after its release. The Last Command was also the first album with new drummer Steve Riley (formerly of Keel), who had replaced Richards at the beginning of the 1984–1985 tour. W.A.S.P. supported the album by participating in two arena tours, opening for Kiss on their Asylum tour, and, along with a then-unknown Anthrax, they supported Black Sabbath on their Seventh Star tour.

After The Last Command tour, Piper departed the band. Piper later appeared on the album Constrictor by Alice Cooper and then formed the band Animal, which in later years featured various other former members of W.A.S.P.

Former King Kobra bassist Johnny Rod joined W.A.S.P. as Lawless went back to playing rhythm guitar. Around this time, W.A.S.P. became a very prominent target of the Parents Music Resource Center (PMRC), an organization led by Tipper Gore and dedicated to opposing music with lyrics deemed violent or overtly sexual in content. This lowered the band's reputation to such a degree that concert halls were getting bomb threats, band members were receiving death threats by the hundreds, and Lawless was shot at twice (though not hit). The controversy generated valuable publicity for the band.

=== Mainstream success (1986–1989) ===
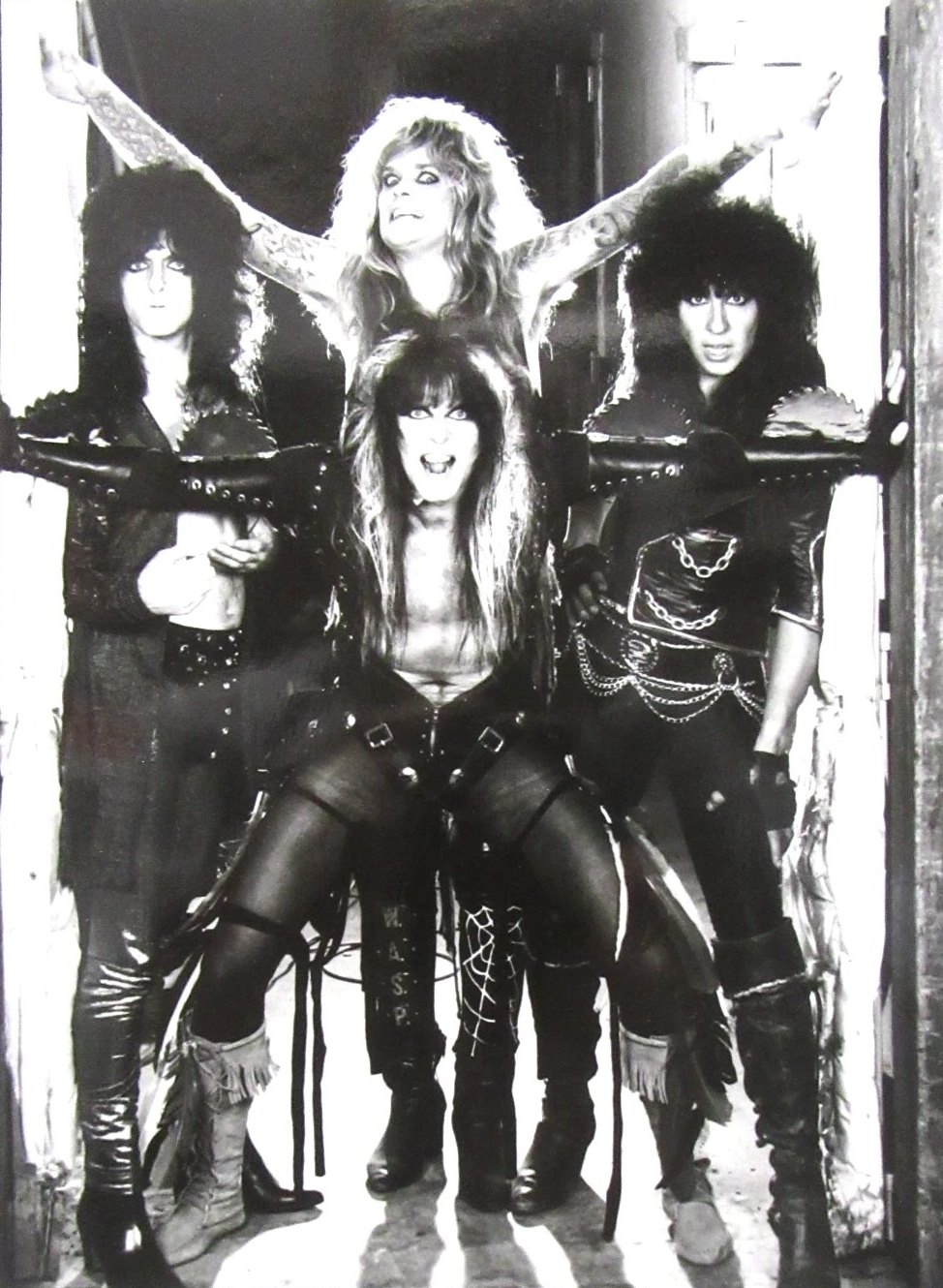
W.A.S.P. in the mid-1980s. From left clockwise: Steve Riley, Chris Holmes, Randy Piper and Blackie Lawless

With the lineup changes made, they recorded their third album, titled Inside the Electric Circus. It was released in October 1986, and a near year-long world tour in support of the album followed, including supporting Iron Maiden on their Somewhere in Time tour in Europe, and a headlining North American tour with Slayer, Raven and Saxon. Inside the Electric Circus received a mixed reaction from the music press: it was considered a big hit with W.A.S.P. fans, while critics, on the other hand, dismissed it as "7th-grader rock". Songs like "Shoot From The Hip" and the minor hit single "95-N.A.S.T.Y." helped the band live up to the reputation of one of the possible meanings of their band name, "We Are Sexual Perverts". However, Blackie Lawless himself, known to be a harsh critic of his own work, cited in the album's re-release liner notes that Inside the Electric Circus was "[a] tired record by a tired band." Ultimately it was an unfavorable critical review of the single "95-N.A.S.T.Y." that convinced Lawless to take some time off and reconsider the band's creative direction.

Hit Parader ran a cover story in February 1987 titled "Stryper vs. W.A.S.P.: Heaven and Hell" that contrasted the two bands. Blackie Lawless described their shock tactics as "entertainment, pure and simple", while Michael Sweet proposed a joint tour, noting Stryper's experience opening for similar bands: "We think the same thing would happen with W.A.S.P. ... Maybe we'd even be able to get through to the people in W.A.S.P.—that would be a real challenge."

In 1987, W.A.S.P. had their song "Scream Until You Like It" included on the soundtrack of the movie Ghoulies 2. The same year, a few dates during the Inside the Electric Circus tour were recorded and on November 27, 1987, the Long Beach Arena concert was released as the Live... in the Raw album. By this time, Riley had left W.A.S.P. to join L.A. Guns, and was replaced by local drummer Chad Nelson. Then-eighteen-year-old Glenn Soderling, who had recorded an album in 1983 with the band Pandemonium, then joined the band, but did not play any shows due to Holmes' illness. Soderling left during rehearsals and was replaced by Kelly Martella for their Donington appearance and a Top of the Pops performance of "Scream Until You Like It" on the BBC. Martella went on to join the band Silent Rage in 1988. Soderling later surfaced under the name "Tripp Holland" in the band Engines of Aggression with former Tomorrow's Child members Rik Schaffer and Craig Dollinger, and is currently making music for TV shows as staff writer with Supersonic Noise.

W.A.S.P.'s fourth studio album, The Headless Children, was released in April 1989, and was their first album without any overtly sexually explicit songs. The album reached the band's highest chart position with No. 48 on the Billboard 200 before falling off the charts in 13 weeks. However, it was W.A.S.P.'s most critically acclaimed work up to that point and, according to a recent Lawless interview, it is now the highest-selling W.A.S.P. album to date. The drumming duties for the album were handled by former Quiet Riot drummer Frankie Banali. It features two of the band's most highly acclaimed songs, the power ballad "Forever Free" and a cover of The Who's "The Real Me". W.A.S.P. went on tour in the United States with Accept and Metal Church to support The Headless Children, playing at smaller venues such as clubs and theaters, as opposed to the arenas and stadiums that had propelled the band into success.

=== Post-Chris Holmes period (1989–1995) ===
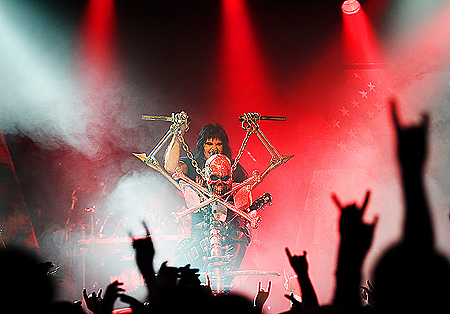
Blackie Lawless performing with W.A.S.P. in Norway

Chris Holmes left the band in August 1989, stating that he wanted to "have fun, you know." Lawless responded with a caustic remark about the fact that "some guys want to stay at home and wear aprons," hinting at the nature of Holmes' relationship with his new wife Lita Ford. The band effectively disbanded a few months later, with Blackie Lawless embarking on a short lived solo career. Lawless was originally slated to play the T-1000 terminator in the movie Terminator 2: Judgment Day, but was later replaced by Robert Patrick after Arnold Schwarzenegger deemed Lawless "too tall" (1.93m). Lawless himself commenced work on his solo project, but under pressure from both promoters and fans, he released it as a W.A.S.P. album. Ironically, many critics feel that the resulting concept album, The Crimson Idol, has been the best W.A.S.P. output so far.

The follow-up to The Crimson Idol was Still Not Black Enough (1995), a collection of dark, introspective tunes that extended the Crimson Idol mythology. This time, rather than "hiding behind" alter ego Jonathan Steele, Lawless spoke directly to the audience about his own feelings (as stated in the liner notes). While the album lacked the cohesiveness of its predecessor, the lyrics still explored similar topics to Crimson Idol: being an outcast and misfit, the pressures of fame and society, and the search for love. Still Not Black Enough also included cover songs as "bonus tracks". The initial European edition included a different track listing from the American version and a subsequent American re-issue featured yet a different track listing. No version to date includes all the various tracks on one disc.

=== Reunion with Chris Holmes (1996–2001) ===
Chris Holmes returned to W.A.S.P. in 1996 and together they released Kill.Fuck.Die (1997) and Helldorado (1999). They also recorded two live albums from these tours, Double Live Assassins and The Sting respectively. The Sting CD and DVD were taken directly from an experimental webcast that Lawless claims to have had no control over. This release angered him as he was unhappy with the sound and picture quality.

The band continued with the album Unholy Terror in 2001. Holmes left the band once again that year, stating that he wanted to "play the blues". He hooked up with fellow ex-W.A.S.P. member Randy Piper's band Animal, but soon dropped out of that project also. Holmes, for his part, has claimed he never played on Unholy Terror.

=== Dying for the World and the Neon God albums (2002–2005) ===
Dying for the World, released in 2002, was written and recorded in less than a year which is very fast by Lawless' perfectionist standards. Its liner notes feature one of Lawless' strongest statements about political correctness, inspired by the 9/11 terrorist attacks.

In April 2004, W.A.S.P. released the first part of The Neon God, subtitled The Rise, a conceptual album about an abused and orphaned boy who finds that he has the ability to read and manipulate people. The second part, The Demise, was released in September 2004.

In 2005, W.A.S.P. headlined American Metal Blast. A video shoot for the track "Never Say Die" was planned with Ward Boult, a fetish photographer, directing. To this day, there has been no news as to whether the shoot resulted in anything concrete. It would have been the first W.A.S.P. promo video in ten years, the last being 1995's "Black Forever".

=== Dominator and Babylon (2006–2014) ===
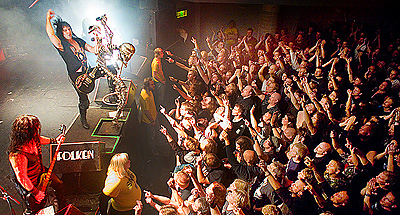
W.A.S.P. performing live in Stavanger, Norway, in 2006

Early 2006 saw the seemingly stable lineup fall apart. Longtime session and tour drummer Stet Howland left first (on amicable terms), promising more specific information about the reasons for the split to be posted on his website. Larry Howe of Vicious Rumors was considered as a replacement. In May, the departure of guitarist Darrell Roberts, who went on to join the band Five Finger Death Punch, was announced and new guitar player Mark Zavon was brought in several days before the first tour date. The same press release confirmed Mike Dupke, and not Howe, would be the new drummer. Furthermore, two days later, Zavon was out of the picture as well, seeing Doug Blair step in on guitar.

A new album, Dominator, was planned for release in October 2006, according to a statement made by Blackie Lawless at a tour stop in Kavarna. He then went on to play a new song from the album, entitled Mercy. A few weeks later, the release of the album was postponed until April 2007, with the band recording two news songs and dropping two cover songs, to be used instead as bonus tracks. In October 2007, W.A.S.P. embarked on The Crimson Idol Tour, to celebrate that album's 15th anniversary. It was the first time that the album, often regarded to be among the band's finest work, was performed in full from start to finish. The tour kicked off in Greece, in Thessaloniki at the Principal Club Theater on October 26, 2007.

The release of the Dominator album was finalized for April 16 in the UK, April 20 in Scandinavia with the rest of mainland Europe following on April 27. The release dates for South America and Russia followed in early May.

Dominator reached No. 72 on the charts in Germany.

W.A.S.P. canceled their North American tour due to their record label's loss of a distributor. They were going to finish up their shows in Europe and then reschedule their shows in the United States. They were unable to finish the shows in Europe because of a "family illness that needed immediate attention" which forced the band to return to Los Angeles right away. They were originally going to perform at Rocklahoma. As the tour was canceled, W.A.S.P. was not able to perform at Rocklahoma and was replaced by Queensrÿche.

W.A.S.P. announced a European tour which included dates in Scotland, England and other places throughout Europe in late October 2007.

W.A.S.P. released their fourteenth studio album, entitled Babylon in late 2009, via Demolition Records.

Shortly after the release of Babylon, Blackie Lawless declared that he was never going to play the song "Animal (Fuck Like A Beast)" live again, due to his religious beliefs. These beliefs are what have allegedly been behind Blackie Lawless' self-censorship of his own lyrics during the "Babylon World Tour", most notably during the performance of "Chainsaw Charlie (Murders in the New Morgue)".

On The Beast of Babylon Tour, Blackie canceled two shows within a week of each other. The first cancellation came about at the Gramercy Theatre in New York City after the band discovered that the venue had been selling V.I.P. meet and greet tickets for twice the amount of the general admission price. The band made a statement claiming, "We have never charged a fan for an autograph and will never charge any fans for an autograph." The second cancellation occurred when the Crocodile Rock venue in Allentown, Pennsylvania wanted 50% of all of the band's profit, according to Lawless.

On September 21, 2012, the band celebrated the 30th anniversary of their first ever live show by kicking off a world tour at The Forum in London. The set for the tour was split into three sections: songs from the first four albums, a cut-down rendition of the Crimson Idol performance and a final segment for newer material.

=== Golgotha, 25th anniversary of The Crimson Idol and next album (2015–present) ===
W.A.S.P.'s fifteenth studio album, Golgotha, was released on October 2, 2015. The album took four years to materialize.

W.A.S.P. toured in 2017 to commemorate the 25th anniversary of the release of The Crimson Idol. To coincide with this anniversary, the band released Reidolized (The Soundtrack to the Crimson Idol) on February 2, 2018, which came with the original The Crimson Idol movie on DVD and Blu-ray, and includes six tracks that were originally intended to be part of the original version of the album.

In December 2017, it was reported that W.A.S.P. had been working on new material for the follow-up to Golgotha. No news on the album had surfaced for more than three years, until December 2020 when Loudwire listed it as one of the 88 "Most Anticipated Rock + Metal Albums" of 2021. Progress on a new album had continued to be slow by January 2022, when frontman Blackie Lawless stated in an interview with Eddie Trunk that the band had "quite a bit of material that [they've] been working on diligently actually." He reiterated the album's slow progress in July 2024.

Former W.A.S.P. drummer Frankie Banali died of pancreatic cancer on August 20, 2020, making him the second deceased member of The Crimson Idol-era lineup, following guitarist Bob Kulick who had died three months earlier.

The band embarked on their first North American tour in over a decade from October to December 2022, with support from Armored Saint, and on selected dates, Michael Schenker. While on their North American tour, Lawless stated that he and the band use backing tracks in their live performances during a Q&A session. Additional tours, including in Europe and North America, were rescheduled to spring 2023 and again to 2024, due to the pandemic situation in Europe as well as Lawless' "extensive back injuries". W.A.S.P. returned to touring during the summer and fall of 2025 by embarking on the "Album ONE Alive" tour in Europe, where they performed their self-titled debut album in its entirety, and will also embark on the "1984 to Headless" tour in North America (which will see the band performing "hits" from their first four studio albums) in September and October 2026.

Original W.A.S.P. drummer Tony Richards died in November 2026, making him the third former drummer of the band to have died (after Frankie Banali in 2020 and Steve Riley in 2023).

== Band name meaning ==
There has been much speculation over the origin of the band's name, and whether it actually stands for anything, since it is written as an acronym. One possible interpretation is "White Anglo-Saxon Protestants", being the original meaning of the acronym. The original U.S. release of the band's debut album W.A.S.P. had the words "We Are Sexual Perverts" inscribed on both sides around the label in the center, while Winged Assassins is inscribed on the spine of the first vinyl pressing. When asked about the band's name, Lawless has avoided giving a straight answer. In one interview he answered, "We Ain't Sure, Pal."

In a February 2010 interview, Lawless stated the main reason for the name was the periods. He claimed no band had ever used them before and, in essence, the periods created a "question mark of uncertainty" to make W.A.S.P. stand out more. He then went on to say, "Look where we are: it did!"

In an interview published on YouTube in 2020, original W.A.S.P. bassist Rik Fox clarified that the name came about after an incident outside Lawless' home, in which Fox happened across a hornet and tried to kill it before it could sting him. The sight of the insect's throbbing stinger brought to mind the image of the Green Hornet logo. According to Fox, this happened while the band was still under the moniker of Sister and Lawless was looking for a new name. When Fox explained what happened to Lawless, the band's leader liked the idea and ultimately adopted it. Fox's story has been corroborated by former guitarist Randy Piper, who while agreeing with him, did acknowledge Lawless as being the one who came up with the idea of the band's name being written as an acronym.

== Band members ==
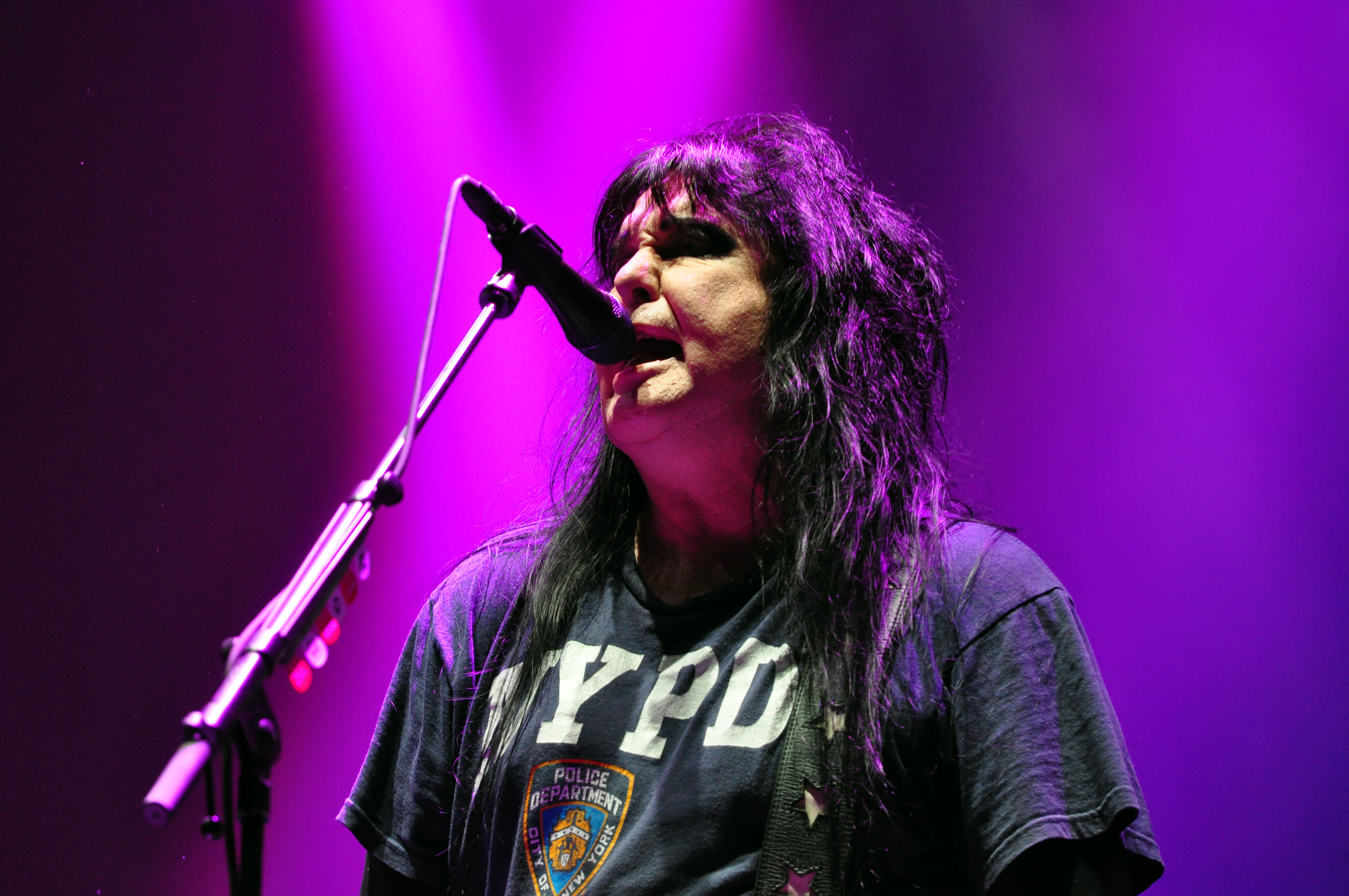
Frontman Blackie Lawless, 2014

Current

- Blackie Lawless – lead vocals, rhythm guitar, keyboards, percussion (1982–present)
- Mike Duda – bass, backing vocals (1995–present)
- Doug Blair – lead guitar, backing vocals (2006–present; touring 1992 and 2001)
- Aquiles Priester – drums (2017–present)

== Discography ==
- W.A.S.P. (1984)
- The Last Command (1985)
- Inside the Electric Circus (1986)
- The Headless Children (1989)
- The Crimson Idol (1992)
- Still Not Black Enough (1995)
- Kill Fuck Die (1997)
- Helldorado (1999)
- Unholy Terror (2001)
- Dying for the World (2002)
- The Neon God: Part 1 – The Rise (2004)
- The Neon God: Part 2 – The Demise (2004)
- Dominator (2007)
- Babylon (2009)
- Golgotha (2015)
- Reidolized: The Soundtrack to The Crimson Idol (2018)
