= The Sting: Live at the Key Club L.A. =

The Sting

Live album by W.A.S.P.
- Released: November 28, 2000
- Recorded: April 22, 2000
- Venues: Key Club, Los Angeles, California
- Genre: Heavy metal
- Length: 65:59
- Label: Apocalypse/Snapper

W.A.S.P. chronology
Helldorado (1999)	The Sting (2000)	Unholy Terror (2001)

The Sting (2000) is a live album and DVD by the American heavy metal band W.A.S.P. Originally released as a DVD/CD set, it is also available as a CD on its own.

The concert was originally recorded and shown as a live webcast, which happened during the band's Helldorado World Tour. The DVD of the show (and the webcast) is the first live footage of the band to feature Blackie's signature microphone stand, dubbed 'Elvis' by band and fans alike. This album according to band members is known as The Sting.

It is alleged that Blackie is unhappy with the way the DVD and CD were produced, feeling that the sound is of an inferior quality.

== Track listing ==
All songs written by Blackie Lawless, unless otherwise noted.

1. "Helldorado" – 3:20
2. "Inside the Electric Circus" – 1:45
3. "Chainsaw Charlie (Murders in the New Morgue)" – 5:48
4. "Wild Child" (Chris Holmes, Lawless) – 6:53
5. "L.O.V.E. Machine" – 6:14
6. "Animal (Fuck Like a Beast)" – 5:16
7. "Sleeping (In the Fire)" – 6:24
8. "Damnation Angels" – 5:59
9. "Dirty Balls" – 5:05
10. "The Real Me" (Pete Townshend) – 4:03 (The Who cover)
11. "I Wanna Be Somebody" – 8:24
12. "Blind in Texas" – 6:48

=== DVD extras ===
- 5.1 Surround Sound
- Album Discography
- Picture Gallery
- Weblinks

== Personnel ==
W.A.S.P.

- Blackie Lawless – lead vocals, rhythm guitar
- Chris Holmes – lead guitar
- Mike Duda – bass guitar, backing vocals
- Stet Howland – drums, backing vocals
