= Still Not Black Enough =

Studio album by W.A.S.P.
- Released: June 1995 (UK and Japan); October 5, 1995 (Europe); August 1996 (US)
- Genre: Heavy metal
- Length: 38:30
- Label: Victor (Japan); Raw Power/Castle
- Producer: Blackie Lawless

W.A.S.P. chronology
First Blood Last Cuts (1993)	Still Not Black Enough (1995)	Kill Fuck Die (1997)

Singles from Still Not Black Enough
- 1. "Black Forever" / "Goodbye America" Released: June 1995

Professional ratings
Review scores
Source	Rating
AllMusic	2/5 stars
Collector's Guide to Heavy Metal	6/10
Rock Hard	8.5/10

Still Not Black Enough is the sixth studio album by American heavy metal band W.A.S.P., first released in June 1995 in Japan and the UK. It was not released in the U.S. until August 1996 through Castle Records.

Still Not Black Enough was originally slated for release as a Blackie Lawless solo album, but due to the heavy content, Lawless changed his mind and decided to release it as a W.A.S.P. album. This had also been the case for the previous album, The Crimson Idol. Still Not Black Enough is considered somewhat a successor to The Crimson Idol, bearing a strong resemblance with its lyrical themes. However, instead of telling the story of the fictional character Jonathan, this album is mostly a collection of personal songs from Blackie Lawless, including issues involving the death of his mother and personal crises just after the world tour for The Crimson Idol.

== Background ==
Like the previous studio album The Crimson Idol (1992), this work functions largely as a solo project by Blackie Lawless, and Bob Kulick again took part in the recording. The lyrics reflect Lawless's personal struggles at the time, and he remarked that "making the new album was like a form of therapy."

The album was released in Japan and Europe in 1995, and in 1996 an American CD edition was issued with some differences in track listing and song selection. Of the tracks added to the American edition, "Skinwater" and "One Tribe" had previously been released in the United Kingdom as B-sides on the 1995 CD single "Black Forever/Goodbye America" (RAWX 1005).

== Track listings ==
All songs written by Blackie Lawless, unless otherwise indicated.

Original 1995 Japan pressing
No.	Title	Writer(s)	Length
1.	"Still Not Black Enough"		4:02
2.	"Somebody to Love" (Original by the Great Society, popularized by Jefferson Airplane)	Darby Slick	2:50
3.	"Black Forever"		3:17
4.	"Scared to Death"		5:02
5.	"Goodbye America"		4:46
6.	"Tie Your Mother Down" (Queen cover)	Brian May	3:39
7.	"Keep Holding On"		4:04
8.	"Rock and Roll to Death"		3:44
9.	"Breathe"		3:44
10.	"I Can't"		3:07
11.	"No Way Out of Here"		3:39

- The European and 2001 remastered versions have the same track listing, without the Queen cover.

American version
No.	Title	Writer(s)	Length
1.	"Still Not Black Enough"		4:02
2.	"Skinwalker"		3:59
3.	"Black Forever"		3:17
4.	"Scared to Death"		5:03
5.	"Goodbye America"		4:47
6.	"Somebody to Love" (Original by the Great Society, popularized by Jefferson Airplane)	Darby Slick	2:50
7.	"Keep Holding On"		4:04
8.	"Rock and Roll to Death"		3:45
9.	"I Can't"		3:07
10.	"No Way Out of Here"		3:39
11.	"One Tribe"		4:59
12.	"Tie Your Mother Down" (Queen cover)	Brian May	3:39
13.	"Whole Lotta Rosie" (AC/DC cover)	Angus Young, Malcolm Young, Bon Scott	3:59

- The American version has the same track listing without "Breathe", but with bonus tracks "Skinwalker", "One Tribe", and "Whole Lotta Rosie". Additionally, there was a 15-track pirated version containing all of the above tracks, plus "Breathe" and a cover of AC/DC's "It's a Long Way to the Top (If You Wanna Rock 'n' Roll)". These last 2 tracks could also be found on some singles.

== Personnel ==
Musicians

- Blackie Lawless – vocals, lead and rhythm guitars, acoustic guitar, keyboards, bass, electric sitar, producer
- Bob Kulick – lead guitar
- John Shadowinds – lead guitar (guest appearance)
- Frankie Banali – drums
- Mark Josephson – electric violin
- Stet Howland – additional percussion (on "Scared to Death" and "One Tribe")
- Tracey Whitney, K.C. Calloway – background vocals

Production

- Mikey Davis – engineer, mixing
- Chris Ashem, Mark Humphries – assistant engineers
- Andy Van Dette – mastering at Masterdisk, New York
- Kosh – album design

== Charts ==
=== Album ===
Chart (1995)	Peak position
Swedish Albums (Sverigetopplistan)	40
UK Albums (OCC)	52
UK Rock & Metal Albums (OCC)	9

=== Singles ===
Year	Single	Chart	Position
1995	"Black Forever" / "Goodbye America"	UK Singles Chart	88
