= Dominator (W.A.S.P. album) =

Studio album by W.A.S.P.
- Released: April 16, 2007
- Genre: Heavy metal
- Length: 43:23
- Label: Demolition
- Producer: Blackie Lawless

W.A.S.P. chronology
| The Neon God: Part 2 – The Demise (2004) | Dominator (2007) | Babylon (2009) |

Professional ratings
Review scores
| Source | Rating |
|---|---|
| AllMusic | 2.5/5 stars |
| Chronicles of Chaos | 8.5/10 |
| Metal Storm | 7.5/10 |
| Rock Hard | 8.0/10 |

Dominator is the thirteenth studio album by the American heavy metal band W.A.S.P., it was released in 2007. The U.S. release was originally planned but the label deal fell through. Covers of "Burn" by Deep Purple and "Fortunate Son" by Creedence Clearwater Revival were included on the originally announced track listing, but were dropped from the album's final cut. Dominator is based on the current American foreign policies.

== Track listing ==
All tracks are written by Blackie Lawless.

| No. | Title | Length |
|---|---|---|
| 1. | "Mercy" | 4:49 |
| 2. | "Long, Long Way to Go" | 3:15 |
| 3. | "Take Me Up" | 4:33 |
| 4. | "The Burning Man" | 4:39 |
| 5. | "Heaven's Hung in Black" | 7:14 |
| 6. | "Heaven's Blessed" | 5:22 |
| 7. | "Teacher" | 5:01 |
| 8. | "Heaven’s Hung in Black (Reprise)" | 3:13 |
| 9. | "Deal with the Devil" | 5:17 |

== Personnel ==
W.A.S.P.

- Blackie Lawless - vocals, rhythm guitar, keyboards, producer
- Doug Blair - lead guitar
- Mike Duda - bass
- Mike Dupke - drums
- Darrell Roberts - lead guitar on "Deal with the Devil"

Production

- Marc Moreau - engineer (except track 4)
- Logan Mader - mixing (except track 4), mastering
- Peter De Wint - engineer and mixing on track 4

== Charts ==
| Chart (2007) | Peak position |
|---|---|
| Finnish Albums (Suomen virallinen lista) | 35 |
| French Albums (SNEP) | 147 |
| German Albums (Offizielle Top 100) | 72 |
| Norwegian Albums (VG-lista) | 36 |
| Swedish Albums (Sverigetopplistan) | 40 |
| UK Independent Albums (OCC) | 18 |
| UK Rock & Metal Albums (OCC) | 23 |
