= Kill Fuck Die =

Studio album by W.A.S.P.
- Released: April 29, 1997
- Genres: Heavy metal; industrial metal
- Length: 45:47
- Labels: Raw Power/Castle; Victor (Japan)
- Producer: Blackie Lawless

W.A.S.P. chronology
Still Not Black Enough (1995)	Kill Fuck Die (1997)	Double Live Assassins (1998)

Singles from Kill.Fuck.Die.
- 1. "Kill Fuck Die" Released: February 1997

Professional ratings
Review scores
Source	Rating
AllMusic	2.5/5 stars
Collector's Guide to Heavy Metal	4/10
Metal Rules	4.0/5
Rock Hard	9.0/10

Kill Fuck Die (also stylized as Kill.Fuck.Die. and abbreviated as K.F.D.) is the seventh studio album by American heavy metal band W.A.S.P., released by Castle Records in 1997.

It differs from their previous releases by incorporating an industrial and more aggressive sound. Guitarist Chris Holmes rejoined the band for this album in a surprise move. According to lead singer Blackie Lawless, he and Holmes had just come out of bad relationships and this is reflected on the album. According to Lawless the record was also inspired by the film Apocalypse Now.

Lawless described the record as "snuff rock" in a video press kit promoting the album. Subsequently, the accompanying tour featured a highly transgressive stage show in which Lawless performed mock rapes of a crucified nun as well as chainsaw decapitations of fake pigs.

It has often been cited that this album is also another concept piece (like The Crimson Idol), as it refers to many issues of relationships and pain and also has a rough story alongside all the tracks that seem to run together, however this has never been confirmed by Lawless or the rest of the band.

In a 2025 interview with eonmusic, Lawless called the album "the most creative record I've ever made", citing that the "imagery of that record is pretty remarkable".

== Track listing ==
All songs written by Blackie Lawless and Chris Holmes.

No.	Title	Length
1.	"Kill Fuck Die"	4:20
2.	"Take the Addiction"	3:41
3.	"My Tortured Eyes"	4:03
4.	"Killahead"	4:07
5.	"Kill Your Pretty Face"	5:49
6.	"Fetus"	1:23
7.	"Little Death"	4:12
8.	"U"	5:10
9.	"Wicked Love"	4:36
10.	"The Horror"	8:26
11.	"Tokyo's on Fire" (Japan-only bonus track)	3:34

- The Japanese version of the CD does not include the tracks "Fetus" or "Little Death", but includes the Japan-only bonus track "Tokyo's on Fire".

== Personnel ==
W.A.S.P.

- Blackie Lawless – lead vocals, rhythm guitar, producer
- Chris Holmes – lead guitar
- Stet Howland – drums, backing vocals
- Mike Duda – bass, backing vocals

Production

- Mikey Davis – engineer, mixing

== Charts ==
Chart (1997)	Peak position
UK Albums (Official Charts)	94
UK Rock & Metal Albums (Official Charts)	8
