= The Neon God: Part 2 – The Demise =

Studio album by W.A.S.P.
- Released: September 28, 2004
- Genre: Heavy metal
- Length: 45:17
- Label: Noise/Sanctuary
- Producer: Blackie Lawless, Darrell Roberts

W.A.S.P. chronology
The Neon God: Part 1 – The Rise (2004)	The Neon God: Part 2 – The Demise (2004)	Dominator (2007)

Professional ratings
Review scores
Source	Rating
AllMusic	2/5 stars
Brave Words & Bloody Knuckles	6.5/10
KNAC	2/5 stars
Metal Rules	4.3/5
Rock Hard	6.5/10

The Neon God: Part 2 – The Demise is the twelfth studio album by the American heavy metal band W.A.S.P. It is the second act of a two-part rock opera about an abused and orphaned boy named Jesse, who finds that he has the ability to read and manipulate people. The first album is titled The Neon God: Part 1 - The Rise.

== Track listing ==
All tracks are written by Blackie Lawless.

No.	Title	Length
1.	"Never Say Die"	4:40
2.	"Resurrector"	4:25
3.	"The Demise"	4:01
4.	"Clockwork Mary"	4:19
5.	"Tear Down the Walls"	3:40
6.	"Come Back to Black"	4:49
7.	"All My Life"	2:35
8.	"Destinies to Come (Neon Dion)"	4:35
9.	"The Last Redemption"	13:39

== Personnel ==
W.A.S.P.

- Blackie Lawless – vocals, guitars, bass, keyboards, percussion, producer
- Darrell Roberts – lead guitar, vocals, percussion, executive producer
- Mike Duda – bass
- Stet Howland – drums, percussion

Production

- Marc Moreau – mixing
- Bob Stone – mastering
- Kosh – album art

== Charts ==
Chart (2004)	Peak position
UK Independent Albums (OCC)	37
