= Doug Blair =

Musical artist (born 1963)

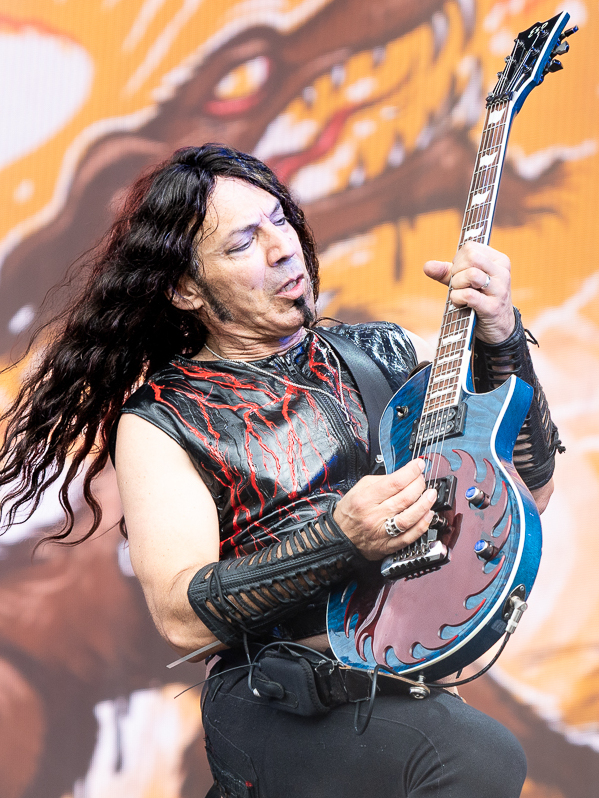
- Doug Blair performing in 2025

Background information
- Born: Douglas Blair Lucek; February 11, 1963 (age 63); Manchester, Connecticut
- Genres: Heavy metal, hard rock
- Occupation: Musician
- Instrument: Guitar

Douglas Blair Lucek, better known as Doug Blair (born February 11, 1963), is a heavy metal guitarist and member of W.A.S.P. Blair's early development as a musician took place in his home state of Connecticut. His focus on technical ability with the guitar quickly saw him gaining a reputation locally in the Tri-State area of New York, New Jersey and Connecticut.

== Music career ==
His early band, Run 21, played small club dates in the Tri-State area and recorded some original material during that time. One of the songs, "Baby It's Your Face", was recorded at Presence Studios in Weston, Connecticut and released on the Metalstorm compilation produced by Jamie Bircumshaw and Tom Boyd in 1985. Run 21 also included Stet Howland on drums, another future member of W.A.S.P. The band was known for its outlandish show (compared to other Connecticut acts) that saw Blair jumping up on the bar and playing while running in between glasses and bottles; Howland's dialogue with the audience also added a comedy element. This style was a precursor to how they would perform with W.A.S.P.

Blair initially played in W.A.S.P. for a short time in 1992. During this time he wrote a guitar column for Mixx Magazine, where he gave instructions and advice on guitar playing. He was also a short-term replacement at two festival gigs during W.A.S.P.'s Unholy Terror Tour in 2001, when Chris Holmes left the band. In 2006 he was hired by W.A.S.P. for the third time.

His other current band is Signal2Noise with percussionist/vocalist John Anthony. Their debut album is titled Fighting Mental Illness.

From time to time, Blair appears as a guest musician for other artists such as Barbe-Q-Barbies.

In May 2016, Blair announced an upcoming collaboration with American alternative metal vocalist and musician Melissa VanFleet. In October 2017, VanFleet released "Raven," a single featuring Blair on lead guitar.

== Musical instrument invention ==
Blair is known for inventing the "GuitarCross" instrument, which blends five guitar strings with three bass strings (guitar strings sent to one amplifier, bass strings to another) to make a unique sound. He uses this invention in s2n and also uses a unique 12-string acoustic named "Asia."

== Discography ==
=== W.A.S.P. ===
- Dominator (2007)
- Babylon (2009)
- Golgotha (2015)
- Re-Idolized (2018)

=== Other work ===
- Dreams in the Witch House - A Lovecraftian Rock Opera (2013)
- "Raven" - Melissa VanFleet (2017)
