= The Headless Children =

- Cover art by John Kosh

Studio album by W.A.S.P.
- Released: March 21, 1989
- Genre: Heavy metal
- Length: 48:32
- Label: Capitol
- Producer: Blackie Lawless

W.A.S.P. chronology
Live... in the Raw (1987)	The Headless Children (1989)	The Crimson Idol (1992)

Singles from The Headless Children
- 1. "Mean Man" Released: February 1989; 2. "The Real Me" Released: May 1989; 3. "Forever Free" Released: August 28, 1989

The Headless Children is the fourth studio album by heavy metal band W.A.S.P., released on March 21, 1989 through Capitol Records. The album reached No. 48 on the US Billboard 200 chart, the band's highest chart position, and remained on that chart for 13 weeks. This was the last album W.A.S.P. released before their temporary breakup in 1990, only to reunite two years later for The Crimson Idol (1992).

== Overview ==
The Headless Children showcases a new level of maturity from the band compared to their previous three albums, which had stereotypically lewd "rock and roll" lyrics. Politics and social issues are now a theme throughout the album. The cover art, designed and illustrated by John Kosh, is based on "Gateway to Stalingrad", a cartoon by Daniel R. Fitzpatrick, depicts a string of historical figures including Joseph Stalin, Adolf Hitler, Heinrich Himmler, Benito Mussolini, Charles Manson, Jim Jones, Idi Amin, Pol Pot, Al Capone and the Ku Klux Klan, with an image of Jack Ruby shooting Lee Harvey Oswald shown prominently in the foreground. Later editions of the album have replaced, among others, Ayatollah Khomeini with additional KKK members.

The Headless Children was the first W.A.S.P. album to feature ex-Quiet Riot drummer Frankie Banali and the last studio album to feature guitarist Chris Holmes for six years until he rejoined the band in late 1995 to record Kill Fuck Die. This is also the band's last album to feature bassist Johnny Rod. In 1990, following departures of Holmes and Rod, W.A.S.P. decided to call it quits, but resurfaced about a year later, with only lead singer/bassist Blackie Lawless and Banali remaining; this was because their next album, The Crimson Idol, was originally intended to be a solo album by Lawless, until he agreed to release it under the W.A.S.P. name.

"The Real Me" is one of two songs the band covered and released as part of the Headless Children release, (the other being "Locomotive Breath", by Jethro Tull, which was the b-side of the single "Mean Man"). "The Real Me" however was the only song of the two to make the album. The song was written by Pete Townshend of The Who's and is from their classic rock opera album, Quadrophenia.

"Mean Man", written by Lawless, is about guitarist Chris Holmes' wild lifestyle and is dedicated to him.

Lawless stated in an interview shortly after the release of the album, that "The Neutron Bomber", is about Ronald Reagan and the power he and America had over the world, with such a large nuclear arsenal. The song despite most likely being written during his presidency, was however released a few months after his retirement and the election of George H. W. Bush. Alternatively, in an interview entitled "Headhunter" published in the May/June 1989 edition of Metal Forces magazine, Lawless said the song "is about a guy named Ronny who I grew up with over in Staten Island who was the biggest mass fire starter in the history of the Northeast! And Ronny is somewhere right now where he's never ever gonna start fires again. Concrete and steel don't burn. Heh heh. He's in for triple life, you know?"

"Forever Free" is a power ballad typical of the time in the hard rock/heavy metal genre, which is supposedly a homage to Lynyrd Skynyrd's "Free Bird".

According to the liner notes, the "F.D.G." in "Rebel in the F.D.G." stands for "Fucking Decadent Generation".

== Critical reception ==
Professional ratings
Review scores
Source	Rating
AllMusic	4.5/5 stars
CD Review	6/10 & 6/10
Collector's Guide to Heavy Metal	7/10
Rock Hard	7.0/10

In a contemporary review for the German magazine Rock Hard, Thomas Kupfer considered The Headless Children second only to W.A.S.P. "brilliant debut album" and remarked how the song structures were simpler and the music more melodic than in previous works, but Lawless' voice had "lost nothing of its charisma".

More recently, Greg Prato at AllMusic called The Headless Children W.A.S.P.'s "most accomplished work" and their "best constructed album". He also noted "The Real Me", "Mean Man", "The Heretic", "Forever Free" and the title track as highlights. Canadian journalist Martin Popoff described the album as "the W.A.S.P. record for those who don't like W.A.S.P., hollow, damp and alone, integrity discovered, humanity revealed."

== Track listing ==
All tracks are written by Blackie Lawless, except where noted.

No.	Title	Length
1.	"The Heretic (The Lost Child) ^{†}" (Lawless, Chris Holmes)	7:16
2.	"The Real Me" (Pete Townshend; The Who cover)	3:21
3.	"The Headless Children"	5:47
4.	"Thunderhead" (Lawless, Holmes)	6:45
5.	"Mean Man"	4:50
6.	"The Neutron Bomber"	4:03
7.	"Mephisto Waltz"	1:27
8.	"Forever Free"	5:09
9.	"Maneater"	4:46
10.	"Rebel in the F.D.G."	5:08
Total length:		48:32

1998 remastered edition bonus tracks
No.	Title	Length
11.	"Locomotive Breath" (Ian Anderson; Jethro Tull cover)	2:59
12.	"For Whom the Bell Tolls"	3:47
13.	"Lake of Fools"	5:29
14.	"War Cry"	5:33
15.	"L.O.V.E. Machine" (live at the Hammersmith Odeon in London, 1989)	4:47
16.	"Blind in Texas" (live at the Hammersmith Odeon in London, 1989)	6:23

^† – On the 1998 reissue, "The Heretic (The Lost Child)" has been edited to remove a small portion of a guitar riff in order to fit all the bonus material on the same CD.

== Personnel ==
W.A.S.P.

- Blackie Lawless – lead vocals, rhythm guitar, production
- Chris Holmes – lead guitar, acoustic guitar
- Johnny Rod – bass guitar, backing vocals

Additional musicians

- Frankie Banali – drums, percussion
- Ken Hensley – keyboards
- Diana Fennell, Lita Ford, Mark Humphreys, Jimi Image, Minka Kelly, Thomas Nellen, Cathi Paige, Mike Solan, Kevin Wallace, Melba Wallace, Ron Wallace – backing vocals on "Thunderhead"

Production

- Mikey Davis – engineer, mixing
- Tom Nellen – assistant engineer
- Rhonda Schoen – editing engineer
- Andy Taylor – manager
- Rod Smallwood – manager
- John Kosh – art direction
- Steve Hall – mastering at Future Disc
- George Marino – mastering at Sterling Sound, New York

== Charts ==
=== Album ===
Chart (1989)	Peak position
Australian Albums (Kent Music Report)	55
Austrian Albums (Ö3 Austria)	19
Canada Top Albums/CDs (RPM)	76
Finnish Albums (The Official Finnish Charts)	18
German Albums (Offizielle Top 100)	22
Norwegian Albums (VG-lista)	13
Swiss Albums (Schweizer Hitparade)	19
UK Albums (Official Charts)	8
US Billboard 200	48

=== Singles ===
Year	Single	Chart	Position
1989	"Mean Man"	Finnish Singles Chart	11
1989	"Mean Man"	UK Singles Chart	21
1989	"The Real Me"	UK Singles Chart	23
1989	"Forever Free"	UK Singles Chart	25

== Certifications ==
Region	Certification	Certified units/sales
United Kingdom (BPI)	Gold	100,000^{^}
^{^} Shipments figures based on certification alone.
