= The Crimson Idol =

Studio album by W.A.S.P.
- Released: June 1992
- Studios: Fort Apache Recording Studio, Hollywood, California
- Genre: Heavy metal
- Length: 57:47
- Label: Capitol
- Producer: Blackie Lawless

W.A.S.P. chronology
The Headless Children (1989)	The Crimson Idol (1992)	First Blood Last Cuts (1993)

Singles from The Crimson Idol
- 1. "Chainsaw Charlie (Murders in the New Morgue)" Released: March 1992; 2. "The Idol" Released: May 1992; 3. "I Am One" Released: October 1992; 4. "Hold On to My Heart" Released: 1992 (EU)

The Crimson Idol is the fifth studio album by heavy metal band W.A.S.P., released in June 1992 through Capitol Records, their last album for the label. It was the first album by W.A.S.P. since the band's temporary breakup in 1990; this was because vocalist and rhythm guitarist Blackie Lawless had intended to release The Crimson Idol as a solo album, until he decided to release it as a W.A.S.P. album. The album charted within the top 40 in five countries. The Crimson Idol is a rock opera, telling the story of the rise and fall of a fictional rock star named Jonathan Steel.

A remastered edition was reissued in 1998, containing a bonus disc of B-sides and live material from 1992. In 2018, Napalm Records released a re-recording of the album, along with a DVD of the film that was originally to accompany the album, under the title of ReIdolized (The Soundtrack to The Crimson Idol).

== Overview ==
Taking nearly three years to complete, The Crimson Idol was originally recorded as a Blackie Lawless solo album, but bandleader Lawless bowed to fan pressure and released it under the W.A.S.P. name.

Unusually, the album's tour, named The Crimson Idol Tour, took place fifteen years after its release to mark its fifteenth anniversary, commencing on October 26, 2007 at the Principal Club Theater in Thessaloniki, Greece. A film recorded for the album was also shown in public for the first time, which was played along with the band as they performed their tracks to it in synch. The shows marked the first time that the album has been played from start to finish by the band since its recording. "Mephisto Waltz", the seventh track from The Headless Children (1989), served as the show's opener, followed by "The Titanic Overture", the first track from The Crimson Idol. All shows had a long encore section ranging from 2–6 songs, containing W.A.S.P. classics as well as "Take Me Up" from their 2007 album Dominator.

A re-recorded version of the entire The Crimson Idol album was announced on January 23, 2017. Details and the cover art of the re-recorded album, entitled ReIdolized: The Soundtrack to the Crimson Idol, were released on November 17, 2017. The 2-CD album itself was released on February 2, 2018.

In 2017, W.A.S.P. played the whole album again on tour to mark the 25th anniversary of its release. The tour, dubbed Re-Idolized: The 25th Anniversary of the Crimson Idol, took place from September through November 2017 in Europe. All shows had a short encore, usually about four or five songs, as well as a few of their classics and the title track from their 2015 album Golgotha.

== Concept ==
The story of The Crimson Idol revolves around a teenager named Jonathan. He is the son of William and Elizabeth Steel, and brother of Michael Steel. Michael is the favored son of his parents, and Jonathan is a complete failure in their eyes. After Michael is killed in a car accident by a drunk driver, Jonathan runs away from home and starts to wander the streets, becoming addicted to drugs and alcohol. While walking past a music store, he sees a guitar and desires to become a rock star. He breaks the display window with a bottle of booze, thus beginning his journey into acclaimed excess.

Jonathan plays the stolen crimson-colored guitar as often as he can in order to obtain money to record an album. He then meets a man named "Chainsaw" Charlie, the president of a major record label. Charlie promises to make Jonathan a star, and introduces him to Alex Rodman, who will become his manager. Jonathan goes on to achieve his ambition of becoming a rock star, but finds out that life is not as glamorous as it seems. Despite now having fame and fortune, he still longs for the one thing he always wanted, that being the love and acceptance of his parents.

One night before a concert, Jonathan calls his parents in an attempt to reconcile their differences and heal the emotional wounds between them. According to the story, "less than fifty words were spoken"; the last four were "we have no son". Realizing that he will never be accepted by his parents, Jonathan decides to commit suicide. During the aforementioned concert, he removes the strings from his guitar, shapes them into a noose and hangs himself.

The overall concept is explained in the 1998 bonus track, "The Story of Jonathan (Prologue to the Crimson Idol)".

=== List of characters ===
- Jonathan Aaron Steel
- Michael Steel, Jonathan's late brother
- Elizabeth Steel, Jonathan's mother
- William "Red" Steel, Jonathan's father
- The Mirror
- "Chainsaw" Charlie
- Alex Rodman
- The Gypsy
- Doctor Rockter
- The King of Mercy

== Critical reception ==
Professional ratings
Review scores
Source	Rating
Collector's Guide to Heavy Metal	6/10
Rock Hard	9.5/10

The German magazine Rock Hard declared The Crimson Idol Album of the Month in June 1992 and the reviewer wrote that it maintained the same "power, roughness, melodic fullness and epic breadth" of its predecessors, with songs "not always at the world-class level, but damn close."

== Track listings ==
All tracks are written by Blackie Lawless.

No.	Title	Length
1.	"The Titanic Overture"	3:31
2.	"The Invisible Boy"	5:12
3.	"Arena of Pleasure"	4:59
4.	"Chainsaw Charlie (Murders in the New Morgue)"	7:48
5.	"The Gypsy Meets the Boy"	4:15
6.	"Doctor Rockter"	3:51
7.	"I Am One"	5:25
8.	"The Idol"	8:40
9.	"Hold On to My Heart"	4:22
10.	"The Great Misconceptions of Me"	9:44
Total length:		57:47

1998 remastered edition bonus track
No.	Title	Length
11.	"The Story of Jonathan (Prologue to the Crimson Idol)"	16:35

1998 remastered edition bonus disc
No.	Title	Writer(s)	Length
1.	"Phantoms in the Mirror"	Lawless	4:36
2.	"The Eulogy"	Lawless	4:16
3.	"When the Levee Breaks" (Led Zeppelin cover)	John Bonham, John Paul Jones, Memphis Minnie, Jimmy Page, Robert Plant	7:06
4.	"The Idol" (live acoustic version)	Lawless	4:35
5.	"Hold On to My Heart" (live acoustic version)	Lawless	4:23
6.	"I Am One" (live at Donington Park, 1992)	Lawless	4:58
7.	"Wild Child" (live at Donington Park, 1992)	Lawless, Chris Holmes	5:53
8.	"Chainsaw Charlie (Murders in the New Morgue)" (live at Donington Park, 1992)	Lawless	8:24
9.	"I Wanna Be Somebody" (live at Donington Park, 1992)	Lawless	6:14
10.	"The Invisible Boy" (live at Donington Park, 1992)	Lawless	4:15
11.	"The Real Me" (live at Donington Park, 1992; The Who cover)	Pete Townshend	3:41
12.	"The Great Misconceptions of Me" (live at Donington Park, 1992)	Lawless	9:45
Total length:			68:06

=== Reidolized: The Soundtrack to The Crimson Idol (2018) ===
Disc one
No.	Title	Length
1.	"The Titanic Overture"	3:31
2.	"The Invisible Boy"	4:18
3.	"Arena of Pleasure"	6:05
4.	"Chainsaw Charlie (Murders in the New Morgue)"	7:44
5.	"The Gypsy Meets the Boy"	4:14
6.	"Michael's Song"	1:52
7.	"Miss You" (Alternate Version)	8:07
8.	"Doctor Rockter"	4:02
Total length:		39:53

Disc two
No.	Title	Length
1.	"I Am One"	6:28
2.	"The Idol"	6:44
3.	"Hold On to My Heart"	4:14
4.	"Hey Mama"	1:41
5.	"The Lost Boy"	4:37
6.	"The Peace"	5:59
7.	"Show Time"	1:11
8.	"The Great Misconceptions of Me"	9:59
Total length:		40:53

== Personnel ==
=== The Crimson Idol ===
- Blackie Lawless – vocals, rhythm guitar, keyboard, bass
- Bob Kulick – lead guitar
- Frankie Banali – drums

Additional musicians

- Doug Aldrich – lead guitar (on "Arena of Pleasure"; uncredited)
- Stet Howland – drums on tracks 7 & 10

Production

- Blackie Lawless – producer, arrangement
- Mikey Davis – engineer, mixing
- Ross Robinson – assistant engineer
- Ian Cooper – mastering
- John Kosh – art director and cover art

=== Reidolized: The Soundtrack to The Crimson Idol (2018) ===
- Blackie Lawless – vocals, guitar, keyboards, bass guitar, arrangement, executive producer
- Doug Blair – lead guitar, background vocals
- Mike Duda – bass guitar
- Mike Dupke – drums
- Frankie Banali – drums (on "The Peace")

Production

- Benji Howell – producer
- Mark Zavon – engineer
- Logan Mader – mixing
- Ralph Ziman – director
- John Kosh – album cover designer and art director

== Charts ==
=== Album ===
Chart (1992)	Peak position
Austrian Albums (Ö3 Austria)	30
German Albums (Offizielle Top 100)	35
Norwegian Albums (VG-lista)	11
Swedish Albums (Sverigetopplistan)	31
Swiss Albums (Schweizer Hitparade)	24
UK Albums (Official Charts)	21

=== Singles ===
Year	Single	Chart	Position
1992	"Chainsaw Charlie (Murders in the New Morgue)"	Finnish Singles Chart	3
1992	"Chainsaw Charlie (Murders in the New Morgue)"	UK Singles Chart	17
1992	"The Idol"	UK Singles Chart	41
1992	"I Am One"	UK Singles Chart	56
