= Mike Dupke =

American musician

- Born: 1974 (age 51–52); Grand Rapids, Michigan
- Genres: Heavy metal, hard rock
- Occupation: Musician
- Instrument: Drums
- Years active: 1993-present

Mike Dupke (pronounced "DUPP-kee") is an American drummer who has played with bands W.A.S.P. and John Mellencamp.

== Career ==
=== Early years ===
As an undergraduate at Indiana University School of Music, he studied with drummer Kenny Aronoff. At 19 years old, Dupke played percussion in John Mellencamp's band alongside Kenny for a short time in 1993, performing on the MTV "Human Wheels" special, The Arsenio Hall Show, and the music video for "When Jesus Left Birmingham".

=== John Mellencamp ===
He played drums on "L.U.V." from John Mellencamp's Dance Naked and "Gambling Bar Room Blues" on "The Songs of Jimmie Rodgers - A Tribute".

=== W.A.S.P. ===
He joined W.A.S.P. in May 2006, replacing drummer Stet Howland (1991–2005/February 2006) in early 2006. Dupke made his recording debut with W.A.S.P. on 2007's "Dominator" cd. In July 2015, Dupke announced his departure from W.A.S.P. after 9 years.

=== Dee Snider ===
In August 2017 Dupke began playing with Dee Snider.

=== Other projects ===
Dupke was also the drummer in the band Hair of the Dog who was signed to Spitfire Records and released two albums, Rise in 2000 and Ignite in 2001. From 2003 to 2005, Dupke toured and recorded with blues guitarist Eric Sardinas. Dupke and bassist Mike Duda (also of W.A.S.P.) joined Alex Grossi's band Hotel Diablo in 2011 featuring Rick Stitch on vocals and Grossi on guitar. In July 2012 the band had signed a record deal with Scarlet Records. They released their debut album Return to Psycho, California in September 2012.

Dupke joined the band Shark Island after the release of their album Bloodline 2.020 in 2020. He appears on their 2024 Live album Memento Mori - Live On The Strip.

=== Personal life ===
He is a long-time fan of Kiss. Dupke is also married with a son and daughter.
