= Blackie Lawless =

American heavy metal musician (born 1956)

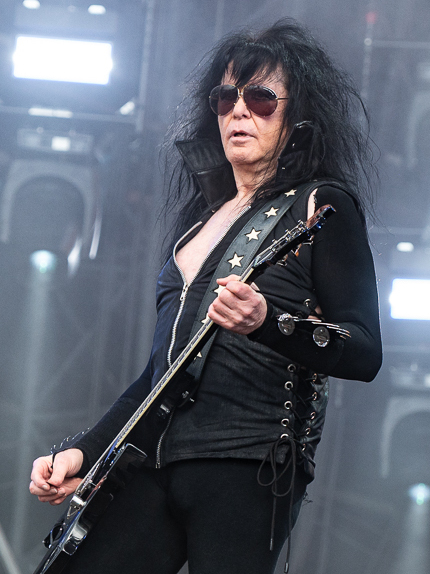
- Lawless performing in 2025

Background information
- Born: Steve Edward Duren; September 4, 1956 (age 69); Tampa, Florida, U.S.
- Genres: Heavy metal, Christian metal, shock rock, glam metal, hard rock
- Occupations: Singer, musician, songwriter
- Instruments: Vocals, guitar, bass guitar
- Years active: 1975–present
- Member of: W.A.S.P.
- Formerly of: London, Circus Circus, Sister, New York Dolls

Steven Edward Duren (born September 4, 1956), better known by his stage name Blackie Lawless, is an American singer, songwriter and musician, best known as the lead singer and rhythm guitarist (formerly bassist) for heavy metal band W.A.S.P.

== Early life ==
Lawless in 2022

Duren was born in Tampa, Florida, and raised in Staten Island, New York City. He had a fundamentalist Baptist upbringing. He has said that he was "very active" in church as a youth and was born again at age 11. In his late teens, Duren strayed from the church and became interested in the occult. Although he would only study occultism for a short time before leaving that too, he continued to use themes of occultism up until his return to the Christian faith in recent years.

== Career ==
Lawless began his career in music playing with bands such as Black Rabbit and Orfax Rainbow. In 1975, after Johnny Thunders left the glam rock band New York Dolls in the middle of a tour of Florida, the band started auditioning for guitarists. Lawless was hired but only stayed for the remainder of the tour. After the tour, he went to California with bassist Arthur Kane and helped found Killer Kane. At that time, Lawless' stage name was "Blackie Goozeman" as stated on the back of Killer Kane's only EP. About a year later Kane returned to New York City but Lawless decided to stay in West Los Angeles. In 1976, he formed Sister, which also featured future W.A.S.P. guitarist Randy Piper. Around 1978, a new lineup was assembled which included Nikki Sixx as bassist and Lizzie Grey on guitar. Later, Chris Holmes joined.

Lawless later formed a band called Circus Circus in 1979, with Piper again appearing in the lineup. In 1981, following Circus Circus' failure, Lawless joined Lizzie Grey and Nikki Sixx's band London, with whom he played a few gigs and recorded two songs as demos, though by this time Sixx had already departed to form Mötley Crüe. In 1982, Lawless switched to bass after firing original member, Rik Fox. The lineup was completed with Chris Holmes on lead guitar and Tony Richards on drums.

=== W.A.S.P. ===
W.A.S.P. underwent numerous lineup changes, with Lawless being the last remaining original member and chief songwriter. In a 1983 interview, Lawless described W.A.S.P.'s stage theatrics as deliberate sensationalism rather than an endorsement of violence: "Just because we put a woman on a rack doesn't mean we're advocating violence against women... What W.A.S.P. is about is reaction and controversy, and as long as we get that I don't care what they say about us." He rejected the suggestion that the band's visual spectacle came at the expense of musicianship: "You can't bullshit a 15 year old kid... You may have the best visual effects in the world but if the music doesn't hold up, you're going to have 'phoney' written all over your face."

Explaining his approach to filling the band's bass vacancy after his own move to guitar, Lawless said he looked for a balance of "attitude and ability": "You can't have one without the other. Attitude without ability is punk rock. Or rap music... There's a place for that, too. But not in kick-ass rock & roll." He selected former King Kobra bassist Johnny Rod for the role.

Many of his songs tend to deal with religious or apocalyptic themes, due to his Christian upbringing. Lawless has stated in interviews that he has returned to the Christian faith and considers himself a born-again Christian.

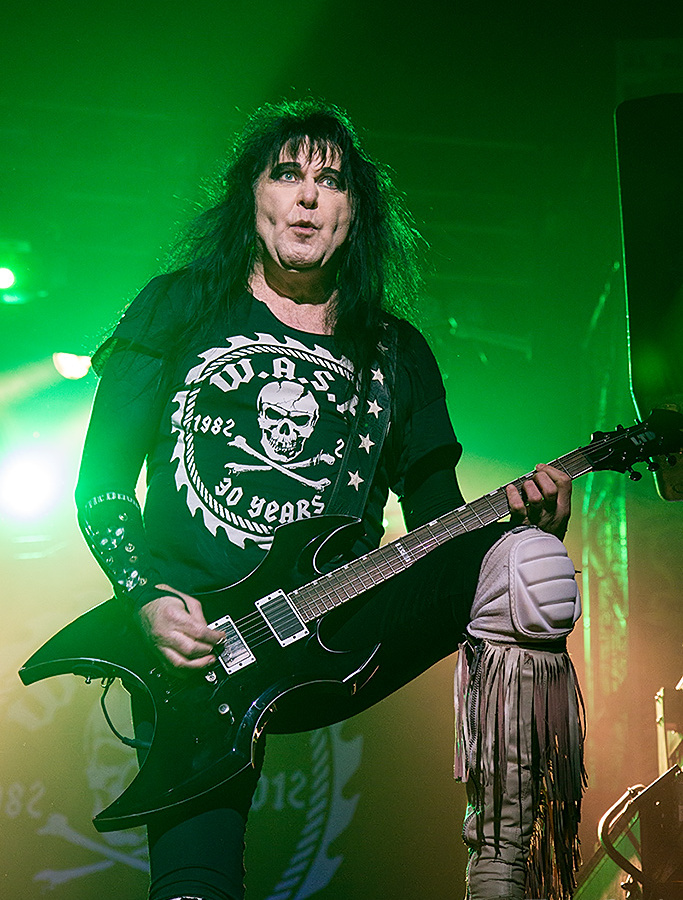
Lawless performing with W.A.S.P. in 2012

Lawless cites influences which include AC/DC, Black Sabbath, the Beatles, Kiss, and Alice Cooper.

Lawless's stage theatrics are heavily influenced by Alice Cooper and Kiss, often imitating Gene Simmons and/or Paul Stanley during performances.

In the mid-1980s, W.A.S.P. faced controversy as Lawless spoke out in defense of heavy metal music against the Parents Music Resource Center after the band faced intense scrutiny for their single "Animal (F**k Like a Beast)". Despite this, the band achieved their greatest success from 1985 to 1988, with several hit singles including "L.O.V.E. Machine", "I Wanna Be Somebody", and "Wild Child". In November 2022, Lawless admitted during a Q&A session that he and the band use backing tracks in their live performances.

Responding to criticism from the Parents Music Resource Center, Lawless said in 1986: "I'm still looking around, trying to figure out what their whole point was. They made a big noise and then all of a sudden went away," adding, "if I don't stick to my guns, then I may as well go too." He said the band had dropped earlier stage theatrics such as simulated torture, noting fan pushback: "We've done a whole North American tour without them and our fans are pissed off. But we don't care."

Writing in Circus at the end of 1986, Daina Darzin noted that Lawless had taken over on guitar following the departure of longtime guitarist Randy Piper, with Johnny Rod joining in time to record Inside the Electric Circus, released that October. Darzin described the album as refining the sound developed on 1985's The Last Command, with the band "slightly mellowed and matured" after weathering criticism from the PMRC and toning down its shock-rock stage show.

In a 1989 interview with Erica Ehm, Blackie Lawless stated that he had been shot at twice due to band-related circumstances. This, with the combination of excessive death threats, resulted in the FBI "living with him" for a month. During the same interview, Blackie had stated that at one point he wanted to be a senator.

In a 1989 letter to press ahead of The Headless Children, Lawless described a deliberate shift toward socially conscious songwriting: "In the two years we spent making this record, a lot of things that I had been thinking about for a long time started surfacing inside of me. Such as my feelings on drug abuse, nuclear war and other political issues."

Reviewing The Crimson Idol in 1993, Foundations called Lawless "a damned fine songwriter" and one of "the last survivors of the now-dead Eighties metal scene," describing the album as "without a doubt Lawless' best work in years."
