= List of L.A. Guns members =

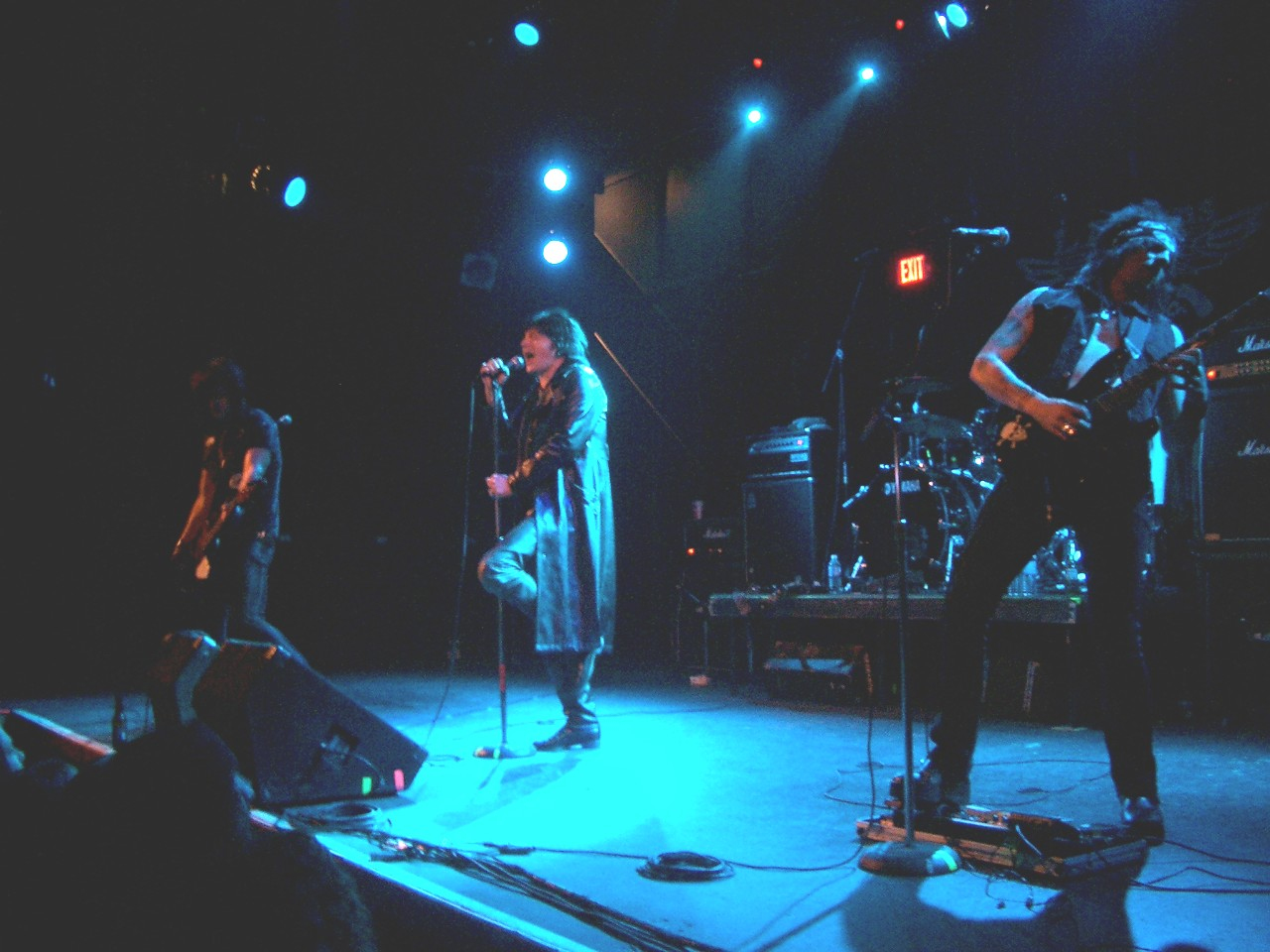
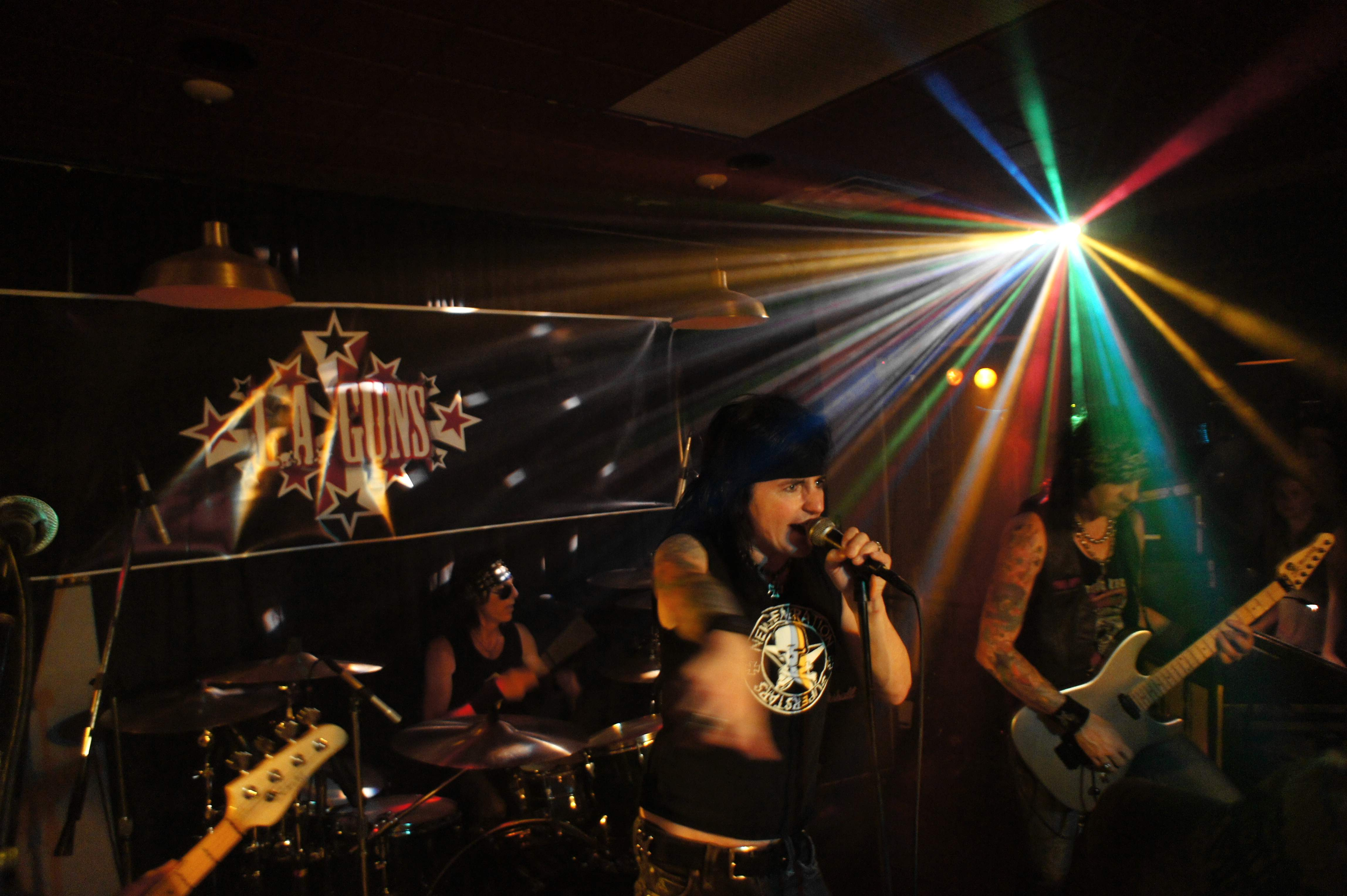
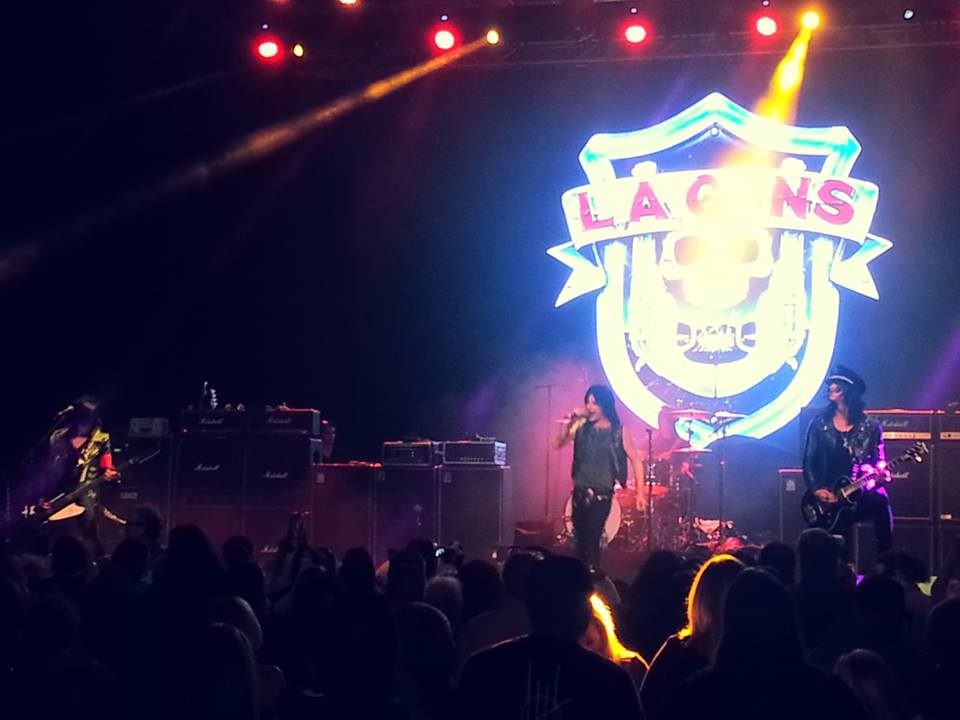
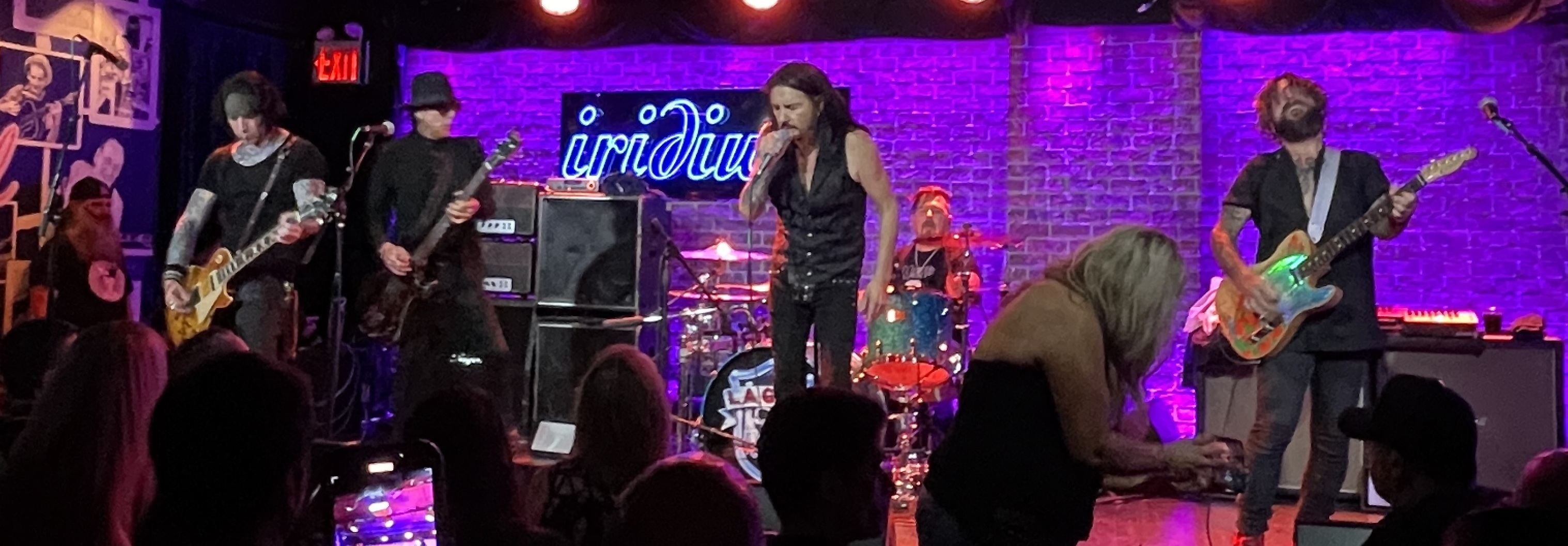
Four lineups of L.A. Guns with vocalist Phil Lewis performing in 2008, 2010, 2015 and 2023.

L.A. Guns is an American glam metal band from Los Angeles, California. Formed in 1983 as Pyrrhus, the group originally included guitarist Tracii Guns, lead vocalist Mike Jagosz, bassist Dani Tull and drummer Rob Gardner. The group was soon renamed L.A. Guns after Tull was replaced by Ole Beich.

The band has been through numerous lineup changes since its inception. The lineup currently includes Tracii Guns, lead vocalist Phil Lewis (from 1987 to 1995, and since 1999; also rhythm guitarist from 2003 to 2016), bassist Johnny Martin (since 2016), rhythm guitarist Ace Von Johnson (since 2018), Studio drummer Adam Hamilton (since 2020, formerly bassist from 2001 to 2007 and rhythm guitarist in 2018) and live drummer Shane Fitzgibbon (from 2016 to 2019, and since 2021).

== History ==
=== 1983–2002: Early years and initial success ===
Pyrrhus was formed in 1983 by guitarist Tracii Guns (real name Tracy Ulrich) with lead vocalist Michael Jagosz, bassist Dani Tull and drummer Rob Gardner. The group was soon renamed L.A. Guns after Tull was replaced by Ole Beich.

Jagosz was briefly replaced by Axl Rose (then using his real name William Bailey) who had previously fronted Rapidfire and Hollywood Rose. After a short stay in jail, Jagosz returned to the band as they released their first EP Collector's Edition No. 1 in 1985.

On December 31, 1984, Tracii has disbanded the group to join Hollywood Rose. When Hollywood Rose disbanded, Guns and Rose merged their groups to form the first incarnation of Guns N' Roses in March 1985.

New L.A. Guns lead vocalist Paul Black subsequently took over leadership of the band, adding guitarist Robert Stoddard, bassist Mick Cripps and drummer Nickey "Beat" Alexander as its new members. By May, Guns had been replaced in Guns N' Roses by Slash, at which point he returned to L.A. Guns.

In 1987, L.A. Guns signed a record deal with PolyGram and introduced new members in lead vocalist Phil Lewis (formerly of Girl and Tormé) and bassist Kelly Nickels (formerly of Faster Pussycat), with Cripps moving over to guitar.

The band recorded their self-titled debut album later in the year, replacing Alexander with Steve Riley before its release. The formation of Lewis, Guns, Cripps, Nickels and Riley is considered the "classic lineup" of L.A. Guns. This lineup remained stable until January 1992, when Riley was fired and replaced by Michael "Bones" Gersema. The new drummer performed on 1994's Vicious Circle, but had been replaced by the returning Riley by the time the album's promotional tour started. L.A. Guns was subsequently dropped by PolyGram, and Lewis and Cripps left the band.

In July 1995, Lewis and Cripps were replaced by Chris Van Dahl and Johnny Crypt, respectively. Nickels left later in the year, with Crypt taking over on bass. The four-piece band released American Hardcore in 1996. The following year, Ralph Saenz replaced Van Dahl and performed on the EP Wasted, released in 1998. Saenz was briefly replaced by Joe Lesté, and later Jizzy Pearl. Crypt left in early 1999, after recording his parts for Shrinking Violet. He was briefly replaced by Stefan Adika, and later by Chuck Garric. Lewis, Cripps and Nickels returned for a reunion of the "classic lineup" in September 1999, releasing a live album and two albums of re-recorded material. Cripps and Nickels were replaced by Brent Muscat and Mark "Muddy Stardust" Dutton, respectively, for a summer 2000 tour, before Cripps returned again. He left again after the release of Man in the Moon. Adam Hamilton replaced Stardust in late 2001, and Keff Ratcliffe joined in June 2002.

=== 2002–2016: Departure of Guns; two lineups ===
L.A. Guns cancelled their support slot on Alice Cooper's upcoming tour in October 2002, with Lewis accusing Guns of prioritising his new group Brides of Destruction, and the guitarist blaming the band's management and miscommunications for the situation. The band quickly returned to performing live, with former W.A.S.P. guitarist Chris Holmes taking Guns' place. By the following month, both Holmes and Ratcliffe had left the band, to be replaced by Keri Kelli and the returning Muscat, respectively. Muscat left in mid-2003, but returned when Kelli left the band in December. However, he also left the band shortly thereafter. In January 2004, former Roxx Gang member Stacey Blades (real name Bryan MaClachlan) was announced as the sole guitarist in L.A. Guns.

In March 2006, Tracii Guns announced that he would be touring with former L.A. Guns members Paul Black and Nickey Alexander, plus bassist Jeremy Guns, to perform hits from the various groups with which he had been involved during his career. The group was initially dubbed the Tracii Guns Band, but was later rebranded as L.A. Guns by the eponymous guitarist. Both versions of the band continued touring and recording new music concurrently. Guns' version of the band went through multiple lineup changes of its own, before the guitarist renamed the group Tracii Guns' League of Gentlemen and distanced it from the original project. The League of Gentlemen remained active, releasing The First Record in 2013 followed by The Second Record in 2014.

The original L.A. Guns remained stable with a lineup of Lewis, Blades, Hamilton and Riley until March 2007, when Hamilton left the band to focus on his work as a record producer. Scotty Griffin was announced as his replacement a few days later. Griffin remained until July 2009, when he left to focus on The King Mixers; he was replaced by Kenny Kweens, who had recently left Beautiful Creatures. Griffin returned in January 2011, after Kweens decided to leave. This lineup released Hollywood Forever – its first studio album in seven years – in June 2012. After six months touring for the album, Blades announced his departure from L.A. Guns in December 2012 due to "extenuating circumstances and musical differences". Frank Wilsey was announced as the guitarist's replacement a week later, however a month later he was replaced by former Endeverafter frontman Michael Grant. In September 2014, Kweens replaced Griffin for a second time as the band's bassist.

=== 2016 onwards: Guns returns to the group ===
In September 2016, it was announced that Tracii Guns would be rejoining L.A. Guns for the first time since leaving in 2002, after the guitarist had reunited with vocalist Phil Lewis at several shows the previous year billed as "L.A. Guns' Phil Lewis and Tracii Guns". On December 1, Lewis announced that he would no longer be a member of the band as of January 1, 2017; however, it was quickly added by the group's new label Frontiers Records that the vocalist was referring to the version of the band featuring bassist Kenny Kweens and drummer Steve Riley, who would be replaced with Johnny Martin and Shane Fitzgibbon, respectively. The band released The Missing Peace in 2017, which was the first studio album by Lewis and Guns together in 15 years. After touring in promotion of the release, Michael Grant left L.A. Guns in March 2018. Although his departure was initially announced to be his choice, Grant later claimed that he was fired for "absolutely no reason".

Grant was initially replaced by Johnny Monaco, who had recently left Enuff Z'Nuff. However, by June he had left the band and been replaced by former bassist Adam Hamilton, with Lewis claiming that Monaco "hated the travel and just wanted to focus on his own stuff". Hamilton had left again by early 2019, with Ace Von Johnson taking his place. In March 2019, Fitzgibbon also left and was replaced by Scot Coogan. Riley launched his own version of L.A. Guns in December 2018, enlisting Jacob Bunton on vocals and guitar, Scotty Griffin on guitar and Kelly Nickels on bass. In April 2019, Kurt Frohlich replaced Bunton as the group's frontman.

Riley died on October 24, 2023, at age 67. His version of the band have since announced that they would continue. On February 28, 2025, Riley's version of L.A. Guns announced their disbandment.

== Members ==
=== Current L.A. Guns band members ===
Image	Name	Years active	Instruments	Release contributions
	Tracii Guns (Tracy Ulrich)	1983–1985; 1985–2002; 2016–present	lead and rhythm guitars; backing vocals	Studio albums: all from Collector's Edition No. 1 (1985) to Waking the Dead (2002); all from The Missing Peace (2017) to Black Diamonds (2023); Live releases: Live! Vampires (1992); Live: A Night on the Strip (2000); The Hollywood Years: Live & Loaded (2007); Extended Versions (2010); all from Boston 1989 (2014) onwards; Other releases: all other releases
	Phil Lewis	1987–1995; 1999–present	lead vocals; rhythm guitar (2003–2016)	Studio albums: all from L.A. Guns (1988) to Vicious Circle (1994), and from Cocked & Re-Loaded (2000) onwards; Live releases: all live releases; Other releases: Holiday Foreplay (1991); Cuts (1992); Hollywood Rehearsal (1997); Greatest Hits and Black Beauties (1999); Hollywood Raw: The Original Sessions (2004); Covered in Guns (2010)
	Adam Hamilton	2001–2007; 2018; 2020–present (session only)	bass, keyboards (2001–2007); rhythm guitar (2018); drums (2020–present); backing vocals	Studio albums: Waking the Dead (2002); Rips the Covers Off (2004); Tales from the Strip (2005); Checkered Past (2021); Black Diamonds (2023); Live releases: Hellraisers Ball: Caught in the Act (2004); Loud & Dangerous: Live from Hollywood (2006); Other releases: Covered in Guns (2010)
	Johnny Martin	2016–present	bass; backing vocals	all releases from The Missing Peace (2017) to Black Diamonds (2023)
	Ace Von Johnson	2018–present	rhythm guitar; backing vocals	Checkered Past (2021); Black Diamonds (2023)
	Shawn Duncan	2022–present (touring only)	drums	none to date

=== Former L.A. Guns band members ===
Image	Name	Years active	Instruments	Release contributions
	Rob Gardner	1983–1984	drums; backing vocals	Collector's Edition No. 1 (1985)
	Mike Jagosz	1983–1984; 1984 (died 2014)	lead vocals	Collector's Edition No. 1 (1985)
	Dani Tull	1983	bass	none
	Ole Beich	1983–1984 (died 1991)	bass; backing vocals	Collector's Edition No. 1 (1985)
	Axl Rose	1984	lead vocals	none
	Mick Cripps	1985–1995; 1999–2000; 2000–2001	bass (1985–1987); rhythm and lead guitar; keyboards; backing vocals	Studio albums: all from L.A. Guns (1988) to Vicious Circle (1994); Cocked & Re-Loaded (2000); Man in the Moon (2001); Live releases: Live! Vampires (1992); Live: A Night on the Strip (2000); The Hollywood Years: Live & Loaded (2007); Extended Versions (2010); Boston 1989 (2014); Toronto 1990 (2015); Other releases: Holiday Foreplay (1991); Cuts (1992); Hollywood Rehearsal (1997); Greatest Hits and Black Beauties (1999); Ultimate L.A. Guns (2002); Black City Breakdown (1985–1986) (2000); Hollywood Raw: The Original Sessions (2004); Black List (2005)
	Nickey "Beat" Alexander	1985–1987	drums	Studio albums: L.A. Guns (1988); Vicious Circle (1994) – one track only; Other releases: Black City Breakdown (1985–1986) (2000); Hollywood Raw: The Original Sessions (2004); Black List (2005)
	Paul Black (Paul Marmorstein)	1985–1987	lead vocals	Black City Breakdown (1985–1986) (2000); Black List (2005)
	Robert Stoddard	1985–1987	lead guitar (1985); rhythm guitar	Black City Breakdown (1985–1986) (2000); Black List (2005)
	Mattie B	1987	bass	none
	Kelly Nickels (Henri Perret)	1987–1995; 1999–2000	bass; backing vocals	Studio albums: all from L.A. Guns (1988) to Vicious Circle (1994); Cocked & ReLoaded (2000) Hollywood Forever (2012) - one track only; Live releases: Live! Vampires (1992); Live: A Night on the Strip (2000); The Hollywood Years: Live & Loaded (2007); Extended Versions (2010); Boston 1989 (2014); Toronto 1990 (2015); Other releases: Holiday Foreplay (1991); Cuts (1992); Hollywood Rehearsal (1997); Greatest Hits and Black Beauties (1999); Ultimate L.A. Guns (2002); Hollywood Raw: The Original Sessions (2004)
	Steve Riley	1987–1992; 1994–2016; (died 2023)	drums; backing vocals	Studio albums: all from Cocked & Loaded (1989) to Hollywood Forever (2012); Live releases: all from Live! Vampires (1992) to Toronto 1990 (2015); Other releases: all from Holiday Foreplay (1991) to Greatest Hits and Black Beauties (1999); Ultimate L.A. Guns (2002); Covered in Guns (2010)
	Mike "Bones" Gersema	1992–1994 (died 2021)	drums	Cuts (1992); Vicious Circle (1994)
	Johnny Crypt	1995–1999	rhythm guitar (1995); bass; backing vocals	American Hardcore (1996); Wasted (1998); Shrinking Violet (1999)
	Chris Van Dahl	1995–1997	lead vocals	American Hardcore (1996)
	Ralph Saenz	1997–1998	lead vocals	Wasted (1998)
	Joe Lesté	1998	lead vocals	none
	Jizzy Pearl (James Wilkinson)	1998–1999	lead vocals	Shrinking Violet (1999)
	Stefan Adika	1999	bass	none
	Chuck Garric	1999	bass	none
	Muddy Stardust (Mark Dutton)	2000–2001	bass	Man in the Moon (2001)
	Brent Muscat	2000; 2002–2003; 2003	rhythm guitar	Rips the Covers Off (2004); Hellraisers Ball: Caught in the Act (2004)
	Keff Ratcliffe	2002	rhythm guitar	none
	Chris Holmes	2002	lead guitar	none
	Keri Kelli (Kenneth Fear Jr.)	2002–2003	lead guitar	Rips the Covers Off (2004) – two tracks only; Hellraisers Ball: Caught in the Act (2004)
	Chris Paulson	2003–2004	lead guitar	none
	Stacey Blades (Bryan MaClachlan)	2004–2012	lead guitar; vocals	Studio albums: Rips the Covers Off (2004); Tales from the Strip (2005); Hollywood Forever (2012); Live releases: Loud & Dangerous: Live from Hollywood (2006); Live in Concert (2013); Other releases: Covered in Guns (2010)
	Scotty Griffin	2007–2009; 2011–2014	bass; backing vocals	Hollywood Forever (2012); Live in Concert (2013)
	Kenny Kweens	2009–2011; 2014–2016	bass; backing vocals	none
	Frank Wilsey	2012–2013	lead guitar	none
	Michael Grant	2013–2018	lead guitar (2013–2016; rhythm guitar 2016–2018); backing vocals	The Missing Peace (2017); Made in Milan (2018)
	Shane Fitzgibbon	2016–2019; 2021–2022 (touring only)	drums	The Missing Peace (2017); Made in Milan (2018); The Devil You Know (2019)
	Johnny Monaco	2018	rhythm guitar; backing vocals	none
	Scot Coogan	2019–2021 (touring only)	drums; backing vocals	none

=== Tracii Guns' L.A. Guns members ===
Image	Name	Years active	Instruments	Details
	Tracii Guns (Tracy Ulrich)	2006–2012	lead and rhythm guitars; backing vocals	Guns unveiled the Tracii Guns Band in March 2006, which was later renamed L.A. Guns.
	Jeremy Guns (Jeremy Carson)	2006–2010	bass	Carson was an original member of Tracii Guns' L.A. Guns. By late 2010, he had been replaced.
	Paul Black	2006–2008	lead vocals	Black was an original member of Tracii Guns' L.A. Guns. He left the band in May 2008.
	Nickey "Beat" Alexander	2006–2007	drums	Alexander was an original member of Tracii Guns' L.A. Guns. He was replaced in early 2007.
	Chad Stewart	2007–2011	drums; backing vocals	Stewart replaced Alexander in early 2007, in time for the recording of the single "I Do".
	Alec "Big Al" Bauer	2007–2009	rhythm guitar	Bauer joined as the band's second guitarist in May 2008, after touring with them since 2007.
	Marty Casey	2008–2009	lead vocals	Casey was officially announced as Black's replacement in Tracii Guns' L.A. Guns in June 2008.
	Jizzy Pearl (James Wilkinson)	2009–2011	lead vocals	In June 2009, it was announced that Casey had been replaced by former L.A. Guns frontman Pearl.
	Danny Nordahl	2010–2012	bass	Nordahl replaced Jeremy Guns in late 2010, but by early 2012 had been replaced.
	Doni Gray	2011–2012	drums; backing vocals	Gray joined Tracii Guns' L.A. Guns in 2011, and remained the band's drummer until its disbandment.
	Dilana	2011	lead vocals	Dilana joined in place of the departed Pearl in September 2011, but had been fired by December.
	Tony West	2011–2012	lead vocals	West replaced Dilana in December 2011, before he was replaced in early 2012.
	Scott Foster Harris	2012	lead vocals	Harris was the last vocalist in Tracii Guns' L.A. Guns before the moniker was dropped in mid-2012.
	Eric Grossman	2012	bass	Grossman was the last bassist in Tracii Guns' L.A. Guns before the moniker was dropped in mid-2012.

=== Steve Riley's L.A. Guns members ===
Image	Name	Years active	Instruments	Details
	Steve Riley	2018–2023 (until his death)	drums; backing vocals	Riley announced in December 2018 that he had launched his own version of L.A. Guns to perform in 2019.
	Scotty Griffin	2018–2025	lead guitar; backing vocals	Riley announced in December 2018 that he had launched his own version of L.A. Guns to perform in 2019.
	Kelly Nickels (Henri Perret)	2018–2025	bass; backing vocals	Riley announced in December 2018 that he had launched his own version of L.A. Guns to perform in 2019.
	Jacob Bunton	2018–2019	lead vocals; rhythm guitar	Riley announced in December 2018 that he had launched his own version of L.A. Guns to perform in 2019.
	Kurt Frohlich	2019–2025	lead vocals; rhythm guitar	On April 13, 2019, it was announced that Frohlich would replace Bunton as the frontman of Riley's L.A. Guns.

== Lineups ==
=== L.A. Guns band lineups ===
Period	Members	Releases	
1981–1983 Pyrrhus	Mike Jagosz – lead vocals; Tracii Guns – guitar, backing vocals; Dani Tull – bass; Rob Gardner – drums, backing vocals	none	
1983 – September 1984 L.A. Guns	Mike Jagosz – lead vocals; Tracii Guns – guitar, backing vocals; Ole Beich – bass, backing vocals; Rob Gardner – drums, backing vocals	none	
October 1984	Axl Rose – lead vocals; Tracii Guns – guitar, backing vocals; Ole Beich – bass, backing vocals; Rob Gardner – drums, backing vocals	none	
October–December 1984	Mike Jagosz – lead vocals; Tracii Guns – guitar, backing vocals; Ole Beich – bass, backing vocals; Rob Gardner – drums, backing vocals	Collector's Edition No. 1 (1985); Hollywood Raw: The Original Sessions (2004); A Fistful Of Guns: Anthology 1985-2012 (2017)	
Band inactive December 1984 – March 1985
March–May 1985	Paul Black – lead vocals; Robert Stoddard – guitar; Mick Cripps – bass, backing vocals; Nickey Alexander – drums	none	
May 1985 – March 1987	Paul Black – lead vocals; Tracii Guns – lead guitar, backing vocals; Robert Stoddard – rhythm guitar; Mick Cripps – bass, backing vocals; Nickey Alexander – drums	Black City Breakdown (1985–1986) (2000); Black List (2005)	
April – July 1987	Phil Lewis – lead vocals; Tracii Guns – lead guitar, backing vocals; Mick Cripps – rhythm guitar, keyboards, backing vocals; Mattie B – bass; Nickey Alexander – drums	none	
July – October 1987	Phil Lewis – lead vocals; Tracii Guns – lead guitar, backing vocals; Mick Cripps – rhythm guitar, keyboards, backing vocals; Kelly Nickels – bass, backing vocals; Nickey Alexander – drums	L.A. Guns (1988); Hollywood Raw: The Original Sessions (2004); A Fistful Of Guns: Anthology 1985-2012 (2017)	
October 1987 – January 1992	Phil Lewis – lead vocals; Tracii Guns – lead guitar, backing vocals; Mick Cripps – rhythm guitar, keyboards, backing vocals; Kelly Nickels – bass, backing vocals; Steve Riley – drums, backing vocals	Cocked & Loaded (1989); Hollywood Vampires (1991); Holiday Foreplay (1991); Live! Vampires (1992); Cuts (1992) – three tracks; Hollywood Rehearsal (1997); The Hollywood Years: Live & Loaded (2007); Extended Versions (2010); Boston 1989 (2014); Toronto 1990 (2015)	
January 1992 – late 1994	Phil Lewis – lead vocals; Tracii Guns – lead guitar, backing vocals; Mick Cripps – rhythm guitar, keyboards, backing vocals; Kelly Nickels – bass, backing vocals; Mike Gersema – drums	Cuts (1992) – two tracks; Vicious Circle (1994)	
Late 1994 – June 1995	Phil Lewis – lead vocals; Tracii Guns – lead guitar, backing vocals; Mick Cripps – rhythm guitar, keyboards, backing vocals; Kelly Nickels – bass, backing vocals; Steve Riley – drums, backing vocals	none	
July – late 1995	Chris Van Dahl – lead vocals; Tracii Guns – lead guitar, backing vocals; Johnny Crypt – rhythm guitar, backing vocals; Kelly Nickels – bass, backing vocals; Steve Riley – drums, backing vocals	none	
Late 1995 – 1997	Chris Van Dahl – lead vocals; Tracii Guns – guitar, backing vocals; Johnny Crypt – bass, backing vocals; Steve Riley – drums, backing vocals	American Hardcore (1996)	
1997–1998	Ralph Saenz – lead vocals; Tracii Guns – guitar, backing vocals; Johnny Crypt – bass, backing vocals; Steve Riley – drums, backing vocals	Wasted (1998)	
1998	Joe Leste – lead vocals; Tracii Guns – guitar, backing vocals; Johnny Crypt – bass; Steve Riley – drums, backing vocals	none	
1998 – early 1999	Jizzy Pearl – lead vocals; Tracii Guns – guitar, backing vocals; Johnny Crypt – bass; Steve Riley – drums, backing vocals	Shrinking Violet (1999)	
Early 1999	Jizzy Pearl – lead vocals; Tracii Guns – guitar, backing vocals; Stefan Adika – bass; Steve Riley – drums, backing vocals	none	
1999	Jizzy Pearl – lead vocals; Tracii Guns – guitar; Chuck Garric – bass; Steve Riley – drums, backing vocals	none	
September 1999 – summer 2000	Phil Lewis – lead vocals; Tracii Guns – lead guitar, backing vocals; Mick Cripps – rhythm guitar, keyboards, backing vocals; Kelly Nickels – bass, backing vocals; Steve Riley – drums, backing vocals	Greatest Hits and Black Beauties (1999); Live: A Night on the Strip (2000); Cocked & Re-Loaded (2000)	
Summer 2000	Phil Lewis – lead vocals; Tracii Guns – lead guitar, backing vocals; Brent Muscat – rhythm guitar; Muddy Stardust – bass; Steve Riley – drums, backing vocals	none	
Late 2000 – May 2001	Phil Lewis – lead vocals; Tracii Guns – lead guitar, backing vocals; Mick Cripps – rhythm guitar, keyboards, backing vocals; Muddy Stardust – bass; Steve Riley – drums, backing vocals	Man in the Moon (2001)	
May – December 2001	Phil Lewis – lead vocals; Tracii Guns – guitar, backing vocals; Muddy Stardust – bass; Steve Riley – drums, backing vocals	none	
December 2001 – June 2002	Phil Lewis – lead vocals; Tracii Guns – guitar, backing vocals; Adam Hamilton – bass, keyboards, backing vocals; Steve Riley – drums, backing vocals	Waking the Dead (2002)	
June – October 2002	Phil Lewis – lead vocals; Tracii Guns – lead guitar, backing vocals; Keff Ratcliffe – rhythm guitar; Adam Hamilton – bass, keyboards, backing vocals; Steve Riley – drums, backing vocals	none	
October – November 2002	Phil Lewis – lead vocals; Chris Holmes – lead guitar; Keff Ratcliffe – rhythm guitar; Adam Hamilton – bass, keyboards, backing vocals; Steve Riley – drums, backing vocals	none	
November 2002 – late 2003	Phil Lewis – lead vocals; Keri Kelli – lead guitar; Brent Muscat – rhythm guitar; Adam Hamilton – bass, keyboards, backing vocals; Steve Riley – drums, backing vocals	Rips the Covers Off (2004) – two tracks; Hellraisers Ball: Caught in the Act (2004)	
Late 2003	Phil Lewis – lead vocals, rhythm guitar; Chris Paulson – lead guitar; Adam Hamilton – bass, keyboards, backing vocals; Steve Riley – drums, backing vocals	Rips the Covers Off (2004)	
January 2004 – March 2007	Phil Lewis – lead vocals, rhythm guitar; Stacey Blades – lead guitar, vocals; Adam Hamilton – bass, keyboards, backing vocals; Steve Riley – drums, backing vocals	Rips the Covers Off (2004); Tales from the Strip (2005); Loud & Dangerous: Live from Hollywood (2006)	
April 2007 – July 2009	Phil Lewis – lead vocals, rhythm guitar; Stacey Blades – lead guitar, vocals; Scott Griffin – bass, backing vocals; Steve Riley – drums, backing vocals	none	
July 2009 – January 2011	Phil Lewis – lead vocals, rhythm guitar; Stacey Blades – lead guitar, vocals; Kenny Kweens – bass, backing vocals; Steve Riley – drums, backing vocals	none	
January 2011 – December 2012	Phil Lewis – lead vocals, rhythm guitar; Stacey Blades – lead guitar, vocals; Scotty Griffin – bass, backing vocals; Steve Riley – drums, backing vocals	Hollywood Forever (2012); Live in Concert (2013)	
December 2012 – January 2013	Phil Lewis – lead vocals, rhythm guitar; Frank Wilsey – lead guitar; Scotty Griffin – bass, backing vocals; Steve Riley – drums, backing vocals	none	
January 2013 – September 2014	Phil Lewis – lead vocals, rhythm guitar; Michael Grant – lead guitar, backing vocals; Scotty Griffin – bass, backing vocals; Steve Riley – drums, backing vocals	none	
September 2014 – December 2016	Phil Lewis – lead vocals, rhythm guitar; Michael Grant – lead guitar, backing vocals; Kenny Kweens – bass, backing vocals; Steve Riley – drums, backing vocals	none	
December 2016 – March 2018	Phil Lewis – lead vocals; Tracii Guns – lead guitar, backing vocals; Michael Grant – rhythm guitar, backing vocals; Johnny Martin – bass, backing vocals; Shane Fitzgibbon – drums	The Missing Peace (2017); Made in Milan (2018)	
March – June 2018	Phil Lewis – lead vocals; Tracii Guns – lead guitar, backing vocals; Johnny Monaco – rhythm guitar, backing vocals; Johnny Martin – bass, backing vocals; Shane Fitzgibbon – drums	none	
June – September 2018	Phil Lewis – lead vocals; Tracii Guns – lead guitar, backing vocals; Adam Hamilton – rhythm guitar, backing vocals; Johnny Martin – bass, backing vocals; Shane Fitzgibbon – drums	none	
September 2018 – March 2019	Phil Lewis – lead vocals; Tracii Guns – lead guitar, backing vocals; Ace Von Johnson – rhythm guitar, backing vocals; Johnny Martin – bass, backing vocals; Shane Fitzgibbon – drums	The Devil You Know (2019)	
March 2019 – March 2020	Phil Lewis – lead vocals; Tracii Guns – lead guitar, backing vocals; Ace Von Johnson – rhythm guitar, backing vocals; Johnny Martin – bass, backing vocals; Scot Coogan – drums, backing vocals (touring only)	none	
April 2020 – October 2021	Phil Lewis – lead vocals; Tracii Guns – lead guitar, backing vocals; Ace Von Johnson – rhythm guitar, backing vocals; Johnny Martin – bass, backing vocals; Adam Hamilton – drums, backing vocals (studio only); Scot Coogan – drums, backing vocals (touring only)	Cocked & Loaded Live (2021)	
October 2021 – May 2022	Phil Lewis – lead vocals; Tracii Guns – lead guitar, backing vocals; Ace Von Johnson – rhythm guitar, backing vocals; Johnny Martin – bass, backing vocals; Adam Hamilton – drums, backing vocals (studio only); Shane Fitzgibbon – drums (touring only)	Checkered Past (2021)	
June 2022 – present	Phil Lewis – lead vocals; Tracii Guns – lead guitar, backing vocals; Ace Von Johnson – rhythm guitar, backing vocals; Johnny Martin – bass, backing vocals; Adam Hamilton – drums, backing vocals (studio only); Shawn Duncan – drums (touring only)	Black Diamonds (2023)	Leopard Skin (2025)

=== Tracii Guns' L.A. Guns lineups ===
Period	Members	Releases
March 2006 – February 2007	Paul Black – lead vocals; Tracii Guns – guitar, backing vocals; Jeremy Guns – bass; Nickey Alexander – drums	none
February 2007 – May 2008	Paul Black – lead vocals; Tracii Guns – guitar, backing vocals; Jeremy Guns – bass; Chad Stewart – drums, backing vocals	none
June 2008 – June 2009	Marty Casey – lead vocals; Tracii Guns – lead guitar, backing vocals; Alec Bauer – rhythm guitar; Jeremy Guns – bass; Chad Stewart – drums, backing vocals	none
June 2009 – late 2010	Jizzy Pearl – lead vocals; Tracii Guns – guitar, backing vocals; Jeremy Guns – bass; Chad Stewart – drums, backing vocals	none
Late 2010 – early 2011	Jizzy Pearl – lead vocals; Tracii Guns – guitar, backing vocals; Danny Nordahl – bass; Chad Stewart – drums, backing vocals	none
Early – September 2011	Jizzy Pearl – lead vocals; Tracii Guns – guitar, backing vocals; Danny Nordahl – bass; Doni Gray – drums, backing vocals	none
September – December 2011	Dilana – lead vocals; Tracii Guns – guitar, backing vocals; Danny Nordahl – bass; Doni Gray – drums, backing vocals	none
December 2011 – early 2012	Tony West – lead vocals; Tracii Guns – guitar, backing vocals; Danny Nordahl – bass; Doni Gray – drums, backing vocals	none
2012	Scott Foster Harris – lead vocals; Tracii Guns – guitar, backing vocals; Eric Grossman – bass; Doni Gray – drums, backing vocals	none

=== Steve Riley's L.A. Guns lineups ===
Period	Members	Releases
December 2018 – April 2019	Jacob Bunton – lead vocals; Scotty Griffin – guitar, backing vocals; Kelly Nickels – bass, backing vocals; Steve Riley – drums, backing vocals	none
April 2019 – October 2023 (billed as "Riley's L.A. Guns" since April 2021)	Kurt Frohlich – lead vocals, rhythm guitar; Scotty Griffin – lead guitar, backing vocals; Kelly Nickels – bass, backing vocals; Steve Riley – drums, backing vocals	Renegades (2020); The Dark Horse (2023)
October 2023 – February 2025	Kurt Frohlich – lead vocals, rhythm guitar; Scotty Griffin – lead guitar, backing vocals; Kelly Nickels – bass, backing vocals	none
