= I'm Addicted =

I'm Addicted may refer to:

- "I'm Addicted", song by Delinquent Habits from Delinquent Habits (album)
- "I'm Addicted", song by L.A. Guns from Cocked & Re-Loaded
- "I'm Addicted", song by Madonna from MDNA (album)
