= The Devil You Know (L.A. Guns album) =

Studio album by L.A. Guns
- Released: March 29, 2019
- Recorded: 2018
- Studio: Big Bad Sound, Los Angeles, California; Pull Studios, New York, New York
- Genre: Glam metal
- Length: 50:39
- Label: Frontiers
- Producer: Tracii Guns

L.A. Guns chronology
The Missing Peace (2017)	The Devil You Know (2019)	Checkered Past (2021)

Singles from The Devil You Know
- 1. "Stay Away" Released: 2019; 2. "Rage" Released: 2019

The Devil You Know is the 12th studio album by American hard rock band L.A. Guns. The album was produced by Tracii Guns and released by Frontiers Records on March 29, 2019.

== Background ==
Tracii Guns stated that after the success of the previous album The Missing Peace they decided to continue with the same metal sound, saying that he drew influence from the New Wave of British Heavy Metal, while also sticking to the band's roots and influences from the 1960s and 1970s. Although Ace Von Johnson is credited on rhythm guitar, he does not play on the album. Tracii Guns plays all the electric guitars on this album.

== Chart performance ==
"The Devil You Know" reached No. 38 on the Billboard Current Album Sales Chart, No. 45 on the Billboard Album Sales Chart, and No. 10 on the Billboard Independent Album Sales Chart. Neither of the two singles, "Rage" and "Stay Away", released from the album charted.

== Track listing ==
The Devil You Know track listing
No.	Title	Length
1.	"Rage"	3:59
2.	"Stay Away"	4:02
3.	"Loaded Bomb"	4:49
4.	"The Devil You Know"	5:20
5.	"Needle to the Bone"	4:01
6.	"Going High"	4:26
7.	"Gone Honey"	4:26
8.	"Don't Need to Win"	4:05
9.	"Down That Hole"	4:30
10.	"Another Season in Hell"	6:22
11.	"Boom" (CD and digital bonus track)	3:14
Total length:		50:39

== Personnel ==
- Phil Lewis – lead vocals
- Tracii Guns – guitars, backing vocals
- Johnny Martin – bass, backing vocals
- Shane Fitzgibbon – drums

== Charts ==
Chart (2019)	Peak position
US Album Sales (Billboard)	45
US Current Album Sales (Billboard)	38
US Independent Album Sales (Billboard)	10
Japan Oricon Albums Chart	179
