= Adika =

Adika is both a given name and a surname. Notable people with the name include:

== Given name ==
- Adika Peter-McNeilly, Canadian professional basketball player

== Surname ==
- David Adika, Israeli photographer and educator
- Stefan Adika, bassist and former member of L.A. Guns
