= SFH =

SFH may refer to:

- 15 cm sFH 18, the basic German division-level heavy howitzer of 149mm during the Second World War
- Samband flytjenda og hljómplötuframleiðenda, an Icelandic organization, see Félag hljómplötuframleiðenda
- San Felipe International Airport (IATA code: SFH), an international airport in Baja California, Mexico
- Scott Foster Harris, American blues/rock singer, songwriter, and multi-instrumentalist
- Star Fucking Hipsters, American punk rock band
