= Hollywood Forever (disambiguation) =

The Hollywood Forever Cemetery is a cemetery in Los Angeles.

Hollywood Forever may also refer to:

- Hollywood Forever (album), a 2012 album by L.A. Guns
  - "Hollywood Forever", the title song from the album
- "Hollywood Forever", by Underscores from U, 2026
