= Devil City Angels =

American rock band

- Genre: Hard rock
- Years active: 2014–present
- Members: Rikki Rockett; Brandon Gibbs; Joel Kosche; Topher Nelson
- Past members: Tracii Guns; Eric Brittingham; Rudy Sarzo

Devil City Angels is an American rock supergroup formed by guitarist Tracii Guns (L.A. Guns), drummer Rikki Rockett (Poison), bassist Eric Brittingham (Cinderella), and vocalist and rhythm guitarist Brandon Gibbs (Cheap Thrill).

== History ==
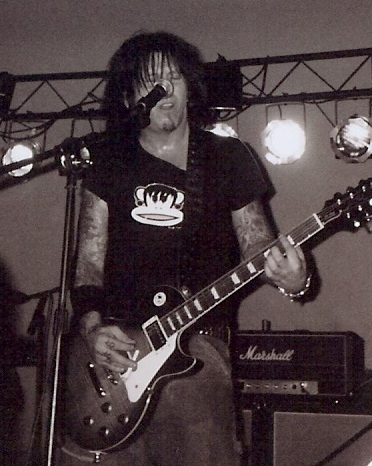
Lead guitarist Tracii Guns

The new rock supergroup officially launched a website and posted some songs including their debut single "All My People" and "No Angels".

Following the recording of the band's debut album, bassist Rudy Sarzo from Quiet Riot replaced Eric Brittingham and the band went on to release their debut music video for their single "Boneyard".

In July 2015, Devil City Angels released the single "All I Need" from their self-titled album which was produced by the band in Los Angeles and mixed in Nashville by Anthony Focx.

The self-titled debut album was officially released September 11, 2015. It charted at number 143 in Germany.

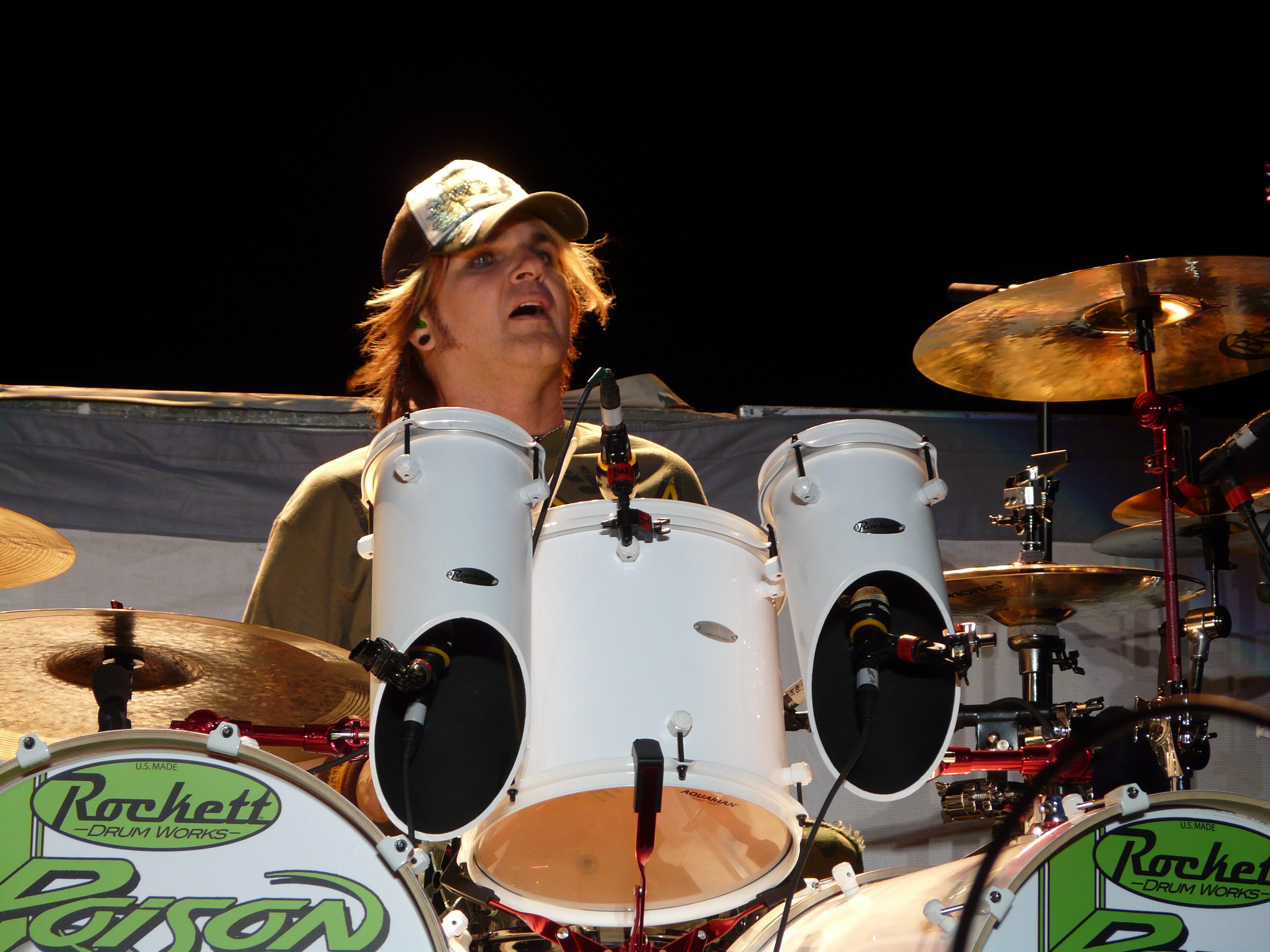
Drummer Rikki Rockett

In December 2015, Rockett announced that he had been battling throat cancer. In July 2016, he reported that he is now cancer-free. The band briefly went on tour in 2016.

In late 2016, with guitarist Tracii Guns booked with his L.A. Guns version for 2017 the band temporarily changed their name to Lords of Devil City featuring the return of Eric Brittingham and new guitarist Joel Kosche (ex-Collective Soul). Lords of Devil City was short-lived as the band re-branded back to Devil City Angels in early 2017. In September 2017, Brittingham was replaced by bassist Topher Nelson (John Corabi).

In 2020, Devil City Angels released the new single and official video "Testify".

== Discography ==
=== Studio albums ===
- Devil City Angels (2015)

Track listing:

1. Numb
2. All My People
3. Boneyard
4. I'm living
5. No Angels
6. Goodbye Forever
7. Ride with Me
8. All I Need
9. Back to the Drive
10. Bad Decisions

=== Singles ===
- "All My People" (2014)
- "Boneyard" (2015)
- "All I Need" (2015)
- "Testify" (2020)

== Members ==
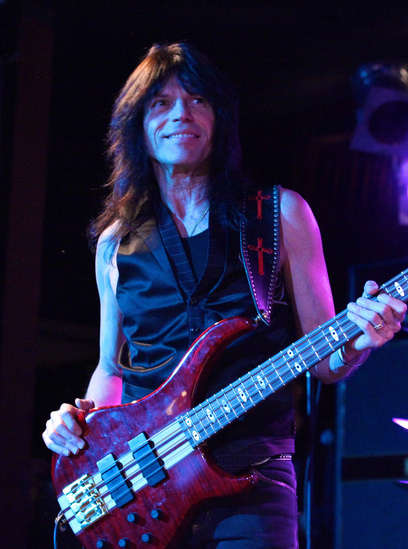
Bassist Rudy Sarzo

=== Current ===
- Brandon Gibbs – lead vocals, rhythm guitar (2014–present)
- Rikki Rockett – drums, percussion (2014–present)
- Joel Kosche – lead guitar (2016–present)
- Topher Nelson – bass (2017–present)

=== Former ===
- Tracii Guns – lead guitar (2014–2016)
- Eric Brittingham – bass (2014–2015, 2016–2017)
- Rudy Sarzo – bass (2015–2016)
