= Cocked & Re-Loaded =

Studio album by L.A. Guns
- Released: 2000
- Genre: Glam metal, hard rock

L.A. Guns chronology
Live: A Night on the Strip (2000)	Cocked & Re-Loaded (2000)	Black City Breakdown (1985–1986) (2000)

Professional ratings
Review scores
Source	Rating
Allmusic	link

Cocked & Re-Loaded is a re-recording of L.A. Guns' 1989 album Cocked & Loaded. It also includes a remix of "Rip and Tear". This album also has at least three different album covers.

Like their previous studio album, Greatest Hits and Black Beauties, this album consists of re-recorded, old material. Their 7th studio album Man in the Moon is all new material, after the band had stopped releasing albums of new versions of older songs.

== Track listing ==
1. "Letting Go"
2. "Slap In the Face"
3. "Rip and Tear"
4. "Sleazy Come Easy Go"
5. "Never Enough"
6. "Malaria"
7. "The Ballad of Jayne"
8. "Magdalaine"
9. "Give a Little"
10. "I'm Addicted"
11. "17 Crash"
12. "Showdown (Riot On Sunset)"
13. "Wheels of Fire"
14. "I Wanna Be Your Man"
15. "Rip and Tear" (Spahn Ranch Remix)

== Personnel ==
- Phil Lewis – lead vocals
- Tracii Guns – lead guitar
- Mick Cripps – rhythm guitar, keyboards
- Kelly Nickels – bass, backing vocals
- Steve Riley – drums, backing vocals
