= Dani Tull =

American artist and musician

- Born: Daniel Joel Tull; 1966 (age 59–60); Los Angeles, California, U.S.
- Education: San Francisco Art Institute, Stanford University
- Known for: sculpture, painting, music
- Website: danitull.com

Daniel Joel Tull (born 1966) is a contemporary American painter, sculptor and musician who lives and works in Los Angeles.

== Early life ==
Tull was born in San Bernardino, California and attended Fairfax High School. In high school he met Michael Jagosz, Tracy Ulrich and Robert Gardner and they formed the band Pyrrhus and played together for two years. Tull left Pyrrhus to attend the San Francisco Art Institute. The remaining band members formed L.A. Guns with Danish bassist Ole Beich in 1983.

== Life and work ==
Tull received a BFA from The San Francisco Art Institute and a MFA from Stanford University. Tull has exhibited in galleries and museums internationally with selected solo exhibitions including Blum & Poe (Los Angeles), Jack Hanley Gallery (San Francisco), The Pit (Los Angeles), Kim Light Gallery (Los Angeles), Fredericks & Freiser (New York), and Torch Gallery (Amsterdam). Tull's recent exhibitions include On Stellar Rays and Jacob Lewis Gallery in New York and LAM Gallery in Los Angeles. Tull's work was featured in The New York Times, Los Angeles Times, Artforum, Art in America, I.D. Magazine, LA Weekly, Wallpaper, and Frieze. Tull has collaborated with a variety of internationally recognized artists such as Jim Shaw, Raymond Pettibon and Marnie Weber. His permanent collection pieces include The Metropolitan Museum of Art, The Getty, Laguna Art Museum (LAM) and The Peter Norton Family Collection. Dani was cited by Ed Ruscha as one of "LA's brightest new talents and truest voices."

As an accomplished musician and composer he has recorded and performed with other musicians and solo performances for The Society for the Activation of Social Space Through Art and Sound, West Of Rome, and the Los Angeles Free Music Society. Dani Tull is a member of D’red D’warf, a band with artist Jim Shaw.

Tull curated a number of exhibitions internationally including the landmark group exhibition Aspects of the Archaic Revival. The exhibit focused on the mystical subtext taking place within the collective subconscious of LA's contemporary art scene and created a dialogue with the city's burgeoning group of mystics, healers and visionaries. The exhibition traveled to the Netherlands and Germany.

Tull is a teacher and mentor at local art schools where he presents his class Fringe Aesthetics: mystic modalities and subjugated forms.
