= Man in the Moon (L.A. Guns album) =

Studio album by L.A. Guns
- Released: April 24, 2001
- Studio: Master Control Studios, Burbank, CA
- Genre: Hard rock, glam metal
- Length: 44:29
- Label: Spitfire
- Producer: Gilby Clarke

L.A. Guns chronology
Black City Breakdown (1985–1986) (2000)	Man in the Moon (2001)	Waking the Dead (2002)

Singles from Man in the Moon
- 1. "Man in the Moon" Released: 2001

Professional ratings
Review scores
Source	Rating
AllMusic	3/5 stars

Man in the Moon is the seventh L.A. Guns album. Long-time vocalist Phil Lewis and guitarist Mick Cripps returned for this album. It is the only L.A. Guns album with bass guitarist Mark Dutton.

== Track listing ==
1. "Man in the Moon" - 4:42
2. "Beautiful" - 4:18
3. "Good Thing" - 3:27
4. "Spider's Web" - 4:37
5. "Don't Call Me Crazy" - 6:42
6. "Hypnotized" - 3:25
7. "Fast Talkin' Dream Dealer" - 4:03
8. "Out of Sight" - 3:22
9. "Turn It Around" - 5:30
10. "Scream" - 4:18

== Personnel ==
- Phil Lewis - lead vocals
- Tracii Guns - guitar
- Mick Cripps - keyboard, guitar
- Muddy Stardust - bass guitar
- Steve Riley - drums
