= Waking the Dead (L.A. Guns album) =

Studio album by L.A. Guns
- Released: August 20, 2002
- Recorded: 2001
- Genre: Hard rock, glam metal
- Length: 39:10
- Label: Spitfire
- Producer: Andy Johns

L.A. Guns chronology
| Man in the Moon (2001) | Waking the Dead (2002) | Ultimate L.A. Guns (2002) |

Professional ratings
Review scores
| Source | Rating |
|---|---|
| AllMusic | 4/5 stars |

Waking the Dead is the eighth studio album by American hard rock band L.A. Guns. Released in 2002, it was the last album featuring band founder Tracii Guns until he reunited with the band in 2017 and the first with bass guitarist Adam Hamilton.

The album includes "OK, Let's Roll" – dedicated to Todd Beamer and those who rushed the cockpit of Flight 93 during the events of September 11, 2001 attacks.

Though slated to be included, the Japanese edition was never officially released, leaving "Call of the Wild" unavailable.

== Track listing ==
1. "Don't Look at Me That Way" – 4:00
2. "OK, Let's Roll" – 3:54
3. "Waking the Dead" – 3:23
4. "Revolution" – 3:26
5. "The Ballad" – 5:21
6. "Frequency" – 4:38
7. "Psychopathic Eyes" – 3:04
8. "Hellraisers Ball" – 3:23
9. "City of Angels" – 3:39
10. "Don't You Cry" – 4:22
11. "Call of the Wild" – 3:51 (Japanese edition unreleased bonus track)

== Personnel ==
- Phil Lewis – vocals
- Tracii Guns – guitar
- Adam Hamilton – bass guitar
- Steve Riley – drums

Additional personnel

- Ricky Beck Mahler – additional guitar on "The Ballad" and "Call of the Wild"

Production

- Producer – Andy Johns
- Engineer – Bruce Witkin
- Mastering – Dave Schultz
- Crew – Brad Nelson
- Photography – Glen LaFerman
- Cover design – Maxine Miller
- Design, layout design – Vinny Cimino
