= Tracii Guns =

American guitarist

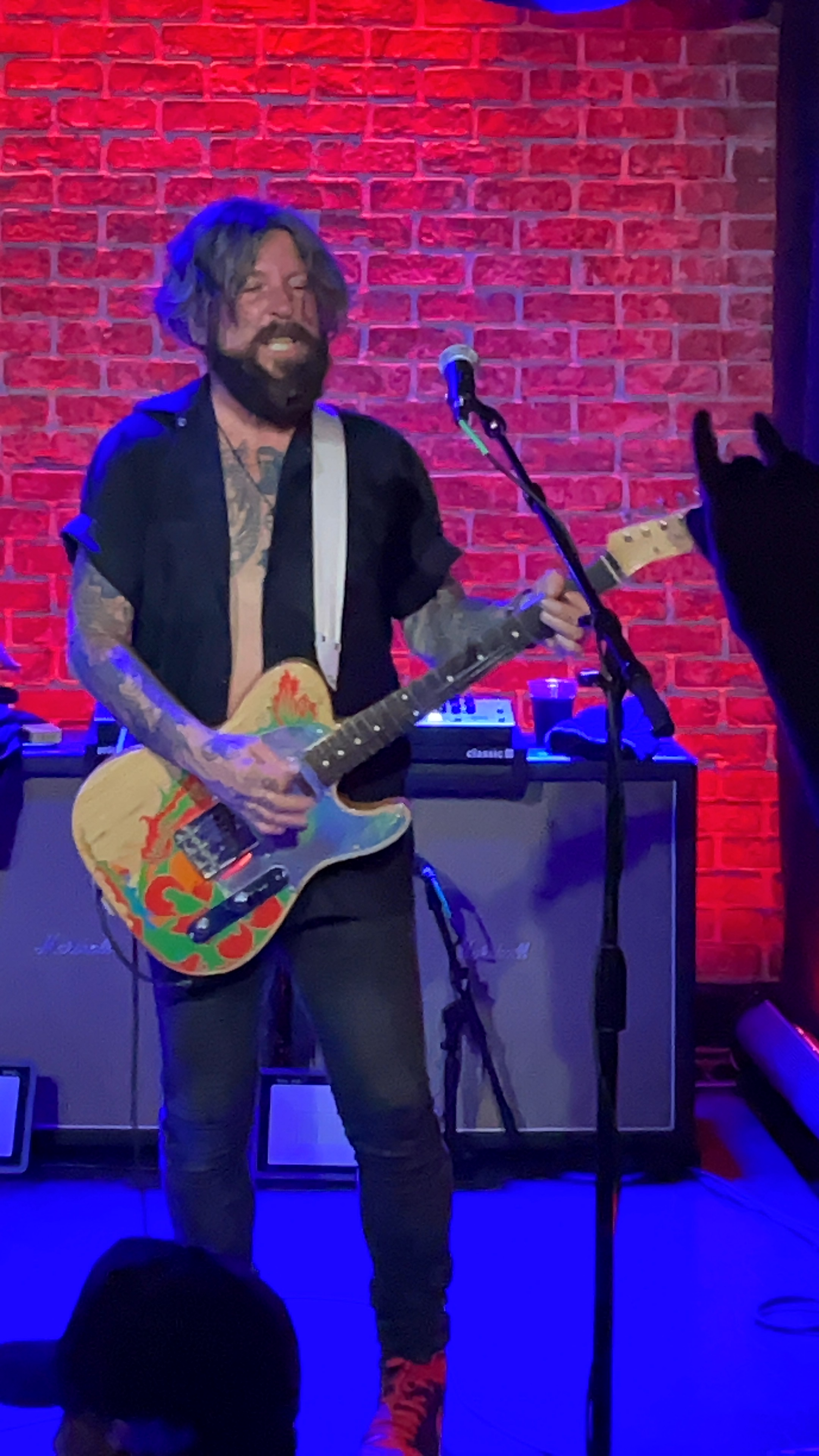
- Guns performing with L.A. Guns in 2023.

Background information
- Born: Tracy Richard Irving Ulrich; January 20, 1966 (age 60); Los Angeles, California, U.S.
- Genres: Glam metal; hard rock
- Occupation: Guitarist
- Years active: 1983–present
- Member of: L.A. Guns; Blackbird Angels
- Formerly of: Hollywood Rose; Guns N' Roses; Contraband; Brides of Destruction; Devil City Angels
- Spouse: Siri Luk (m. 2018; div. 2023)
- Website: lagunsmusic.com

Tracy Irving Richard Ulrich (born January 20, 1966), known professionally as Tracii Guns, is an American guitarist best known as the co-founder of glam metal group L.A. Guns, as well as the supergroups Brides of Destruction and Contraband. He was also a founding member of Guns N' Roses. However, he left shortly afterwards; he was replaced by guitarist Slash.

== Early life ==
Ulrich's uncle Ron taught him how to play guitar at a young age.

Ulrich attended Fairfax High in Los Angeles. While there, he met future L.A. Guns members Rob Gardner and Michael Jagosz. The three formed a band called Pyrrhus with bassist Dani Tull. Ulrich (now going by Tracii Guns), Gardner, and Jagosz recruited Danish bassist Ole Beich for their new band in 1983, now named L.A. Guns.

Ulrich cites Johnny Thunders, Randy Rhoads, Eddie Van Halen, Mick Jagger, Michael Schenker, Tony Iommi, and Jimmy Page as his influences.

== Biography ==
=== First stint with L.A. Guns and Guns N' Roses (1983–1985) ===
L.A. Guns was formed by Guns in 1983, initially with singer Mike Jagosz, bassist Ole Beich, and drummer Rob Gardner. This lineup recorded the EP Collector's Edition No. 1 which would be the only release from the band with its original lineup. After Jagosz was arrested in a bar fight, Bill Rose (later known as Axl Rose) joined the band as singer. Rose had previously fronted Hollywood Rose, backed by Izzy Stradlin and Chris Weber. Rose's stint in the band was short-lived, as Jagosz returned weeks later. Guns joined a newly reunited Hollywood Rose (alongside Rose, Stradlin, Gardner, and Steve Darrow) for a 1985 New Years show. Shortly afterwards, L.A. Guns and Hollywood Rose merged bands to become Guns N' Roses, with the lineup consisting of Guns, Rose, Stradlin, Gardner, and Beich. Guns, Beich, and Gardner would exit Guns N' Roses just two months into the new band, with Guns leaving after an argument with Rose, claiming "It just wasn't fun anymore." Guns was replaced by Slash, while Gardner and Beich were replaced by Steven Adler and Duff McKagan respectively, forming the "classic lineup" of Guns N' Roses.

=== Reformation of L.A. Guns (1985–2002) ===
Later in 1985, Guns and singer Paul Black reformed L.A. Guns, recruiting former Dogs D'Amour singer Robert Stoddard to be the new guitarist with the group, which was rounded out by Nickey "Beat" Alexander on drums and Mick Cripps on bass. The group's lineup would change with Black being replaced by Girl frontman Phil Lewis, bassist Cripps switching to guitar, replacing Stoddard, and former Faster Pussycat bassist Kelly Nickels joining the group. L.A. Guns recorded their eponymous first album that was released in 1988 on Vertigo Records, charting at number 50 on the Billboard 200. On the first album's supporting tour, Alexander was replaced by former W.A.S.P. drummer Steve Riley with the lineup being regarded as the Classic lineup of L.A. Guns. This lineup remained until 1992. In 1989, they released their second album Cocked & Loaded, which charted higher on the Billboard 200 at number 38. During 1991, the band released their third album Hollywood Vampires on Polydor Records. In 1994, they released their fourth album Vicious Circle, drummer Michael "Bones" Gersema played on parts of this recording as this was around the time Phil Lewis fired drummer Steve Riley in January 1992 after touring with Skid Row in support of Hollywood Vampires. Riley later returned to the band for the successful Vicious Circle club tour. After this, L.A. Guns were dropped from Polygram (Vertigo/Polydor) Records. Phil Lewis and Mick Cripps then left the band.

July 1995 saw Guns and Steve Riley recruit vocalist Chris Van Dahl and guitarist Johnny Crypt (ex-Ripper, aka Johnny Crystal) after seeing them perform with their band Boneyard. Six months into recording sessions, Kelly Nickels left the band and Johnny switched to the bass. In 1996, the new L.A. Guns released their fifth record, titled American Hardcore. They toured throughout 1996 and into 1997 where Tracii let Chris go, who was replaced by singer Ralph Saenz. Tracii, Steve, Johnny, and Ralph toured for the remainder of '97 and in early '98 released the six song EP Wasted. Halfway through the band's 1998 Rock Never Stops tour, Ralph quit to form his own band, forcing the band to find a new singer. Joe Lesté from Bang Tango and Jizzy Pearl from Love/Hate were considered as candidates, with Pearl getting the job. They toured in late 1998 and early 1999 and released Shrinking Violet, produced by former Guns N' Roses guitarist Gilby Clarke. This release was followed shortly by Crypt's departure.

In September 1999, the classic lineup of Tracii Guns, Steve Riley, Phil Lewis, Kelly Nickels, and Mick Cripps prepared to reunite. L.A. Guns set out on the reunion tour in October 1999 and recorded a live album in their hometown of Hollywood, enlisting Gilby Clarke as producer. The album, named Live: A Night on the Strip, was released the following year. After the reunion, Mick and Kelly couldn't commit to the summer 2000 tour, so they were replaced by guitarist Brent Muscat and bassist Muddy Stardust, respectively. Ratt and L.A. Guns teamed up with Warrant for a remainder-of-the-summer tour, which L.A. Guns dropped off in August due to booking problems. Mick Cripps again rejoined the band briefly in late 2000 to record an album with the band, entitled Man in the Moon, which was released on Spitfire Records in April 2001. L.A. Guns released the album Waking the Dead, the last album to feature Tracii Guns, in August 2002, produced by Andy Johns, to mainly positive reviews from critics and fans. The future of L.A. Guns was in doubt until both Steve Riley and Phil Lewis told the Hairball John Radio Show that the band would continue despite Tracii Guns' involvement in Brides of Destruction.

Guns left the band in October 2002.

=== Brides of Destruction (2002–2005) ===
Despite signing a deal with Spitfire Records, Tracii Guns left L.A. Guns during the recording of a new album, to form Brides of Destruction with Nikki Sixx, initially with the name Cockstar, after Mötley Crüe went on hiatus. After a number of changes, the lineup was rounded off with singer London LeGrand and drummer Scot Coogan. They released Here Come The Brides, which charted at number 92 on the Billboard 200, in 2004 and was the first album featuring Guns to chart since Hollywood Vampires in 1991. Nikki Sixx would leave the group in October 2004. Initially Guns was to form a new band with the remaining Brides members and also offered his services to Axl Rose in a bid to join Guns N' Roses. Eventually he continued with the Brides and Scott Sorry formerly of Amen was chosen as Sixx's replacement. Ginger of the Wildhearts was added as the band's second guitarist. The band then started writing for what would become Runaway Brides but soon after, Ginger departed the Brides. The follow-up to Here Come the Brides, Runaway Brides, was produced by Andy Johns who had previously worked with Guns on the L.A. Guns album Waking the Dead. Three of the songs of the album were co-written by Nikki Sixx, written during the "Here Come the Bride" sessions with former guitarist Ginger also contributing writing on 3 tracks prior to leaving. The album saw a change in a style with it leaning towards a heavy metal sound in contrast with the hard rock/post-grunge sound of the first album. "Dimes in Heaven" was written as a tribute to recently deceased Pantera and Damageplan guitarist Dimebag Darrell. After signing a new deal with Shrapnel Records, the album was released in Europe on September 13 and on September 27 in the US. A video was shot for "White Trash" but both the album and the single failed to chart. With the formation of The Tracii Guns Band, later the second L.A. Guns, the Brides were put on indefinite hiatus.

=== Third Stint with L.A. Guns (2005–2013) ===
In 2006, Guns announced he was to perform a 'Best Of" tour with former L.A. Guns members Paul Black on vocals, Nickey Alexander on drums and former Brides live member Jeremy Guns rounding up the lineup on bass following a brief stint with Quiet Riot. With The Tracii Guns Band touring, this put Brides of Destruction on indefinite hiatus in 2006. Eventually The Tracii Guns Band would become the second L.A. Guns. Drummer Chad Stewart eventually joined the group replacing Nickey Alexander. On March 4, 2008, Tracii Guns' L.A. Guns was announced as one of the acts of the second Rocklahoma festival.

In 2008, Tracii Guns' L.A. Guns signed a deal with Alexis Records and began working on material for a new album with producer Steve Thompson. Singer Marty Casey, of Lovehammers, was asked to co-write some songs with the band by bassist Jeremy Guns. Eventually Paul Black left the group and Marty was asked to replace him. They finished recording the album and set a release date for March 2009. The group toured through 2008 and early 2009 and also recorded a pilot for VH1. While waiting for a release date to be set for the new album, as well as deciding on a new name for the band, Marty Casey returned to Lovehammers releasing new album Heavy Crown. Jizzy Pearl returned to front L.A. Guns for a summer tour while guitarist Alec Bauer departed the band.

After a long-running dispute with Phil Lewis (Lewis had been touring as "Phil Lewis's L.A. Guns") over the name to the group, Tracii Guns disbanded his version of L.A. Guns in July 2012.

=== Tracii Guns' League of Gentlemen (2012–present) ===
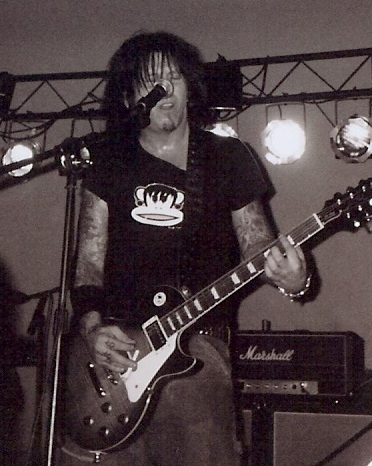
Guns live in 2006

In 2012, Guns formed a blues-rock band called "Tracii Guns' League of Gentlemen" with front man Scott Foster Harris, a one-time member of the L.A. Guns. Harris, a native Texan, provides vocals for the League. Other musicians in the band bass player Craig "Patches" McCloskey, drummer Doni Gray (L.A. Guns, Burning Tree), and keyboardist John Bird. The band's music is inspired by British and American psychedelic blues and rock music from the 1960s and 1970s.

In June 2013, the band released their debut album, The First Record through Shrapnel Records. In August 2014, The Second Record was released, again with Shrapnel Records.

=== Fourth Stint with L.A. Guns (2016-present) ===
In the summer of 2016, Guns teamed up with Phil Lewis for the first time in 14 years for a handful of shows under the name "L.A. Guns' Phil Lewis + Tracii Guns". Under the "L.A. Guns" name, Guns and Lewis released a new album The Missing Peace on October 13, 2017.

=== Sunbomb with Michael Sweet (2021) ===
On May 14, 2021, Tracii Guns and Stryper frontman Michael Sweet released the album Evil and Divine on Frontiers Records as a project titled Sunbomb. In an interview with the radio show and podcast The Hard, Heavy & Hair Show with Pariah Burke, Guns described the Doom Metal-influenced Sunbomb album as, the "first focused, I-don't-give-a-shit Metal album I've ever done."

Sometime during 2017, Guns was approached by Serafino Perugino, President and A&R director of Frontiers Music SRL, about doing a solo album. Guns told Pariah Burke, "no way was I going to do an instrumental album." Eventually, Guns settled on the idea of writing and recording an album of music that reminded him of "what I used to listen to when I was a teenager first learning to play guitar." The result is an album of much heavier songs than Guns' usual songwriting for L.A. Guns or past projects Contraband and Brides of Destruction, though, Guns said, parts of the Sunbomb music are reminiscent of his playing in Devil City Angels. When it came time to choose a vocalist, Guns turned to Stryper's Michael Sweet, whom Guns told Burke he had befriended years earlier during a shared tour stopover in Massachusetts.

Evil and Divine also features drums by Adam Hamilton (L.A. Guns), Johnny Martin (L.A. Guns) playing bass on song "They Fought," and Mitch Davis playing bass on the other 10 tracks.

=== Other work ===
Guns appeared in the cast of the video for Michael Jackson's 1983 hit "Beat It."

Contraband was a short-lived supergroup/side project that included vocalist Richard Black, of Shark Island, guitarist Michael Schenker, of Scorpions, UFO and Michael Schenker Group, bassist Share Pedersen, of Vixen, drummer Bobby Blotzer, of Ratt, and Guns taking up the second guitar role. They released one self-titled album in 1991 which received lukewarm reviews. The album was a commercial failure and the band disbanded shortly after, while touring with Ratt.

In 1999, Guns played a show in Hollywood, California with former Guns N' Roses guitarist Gilby Clarke, who produced the L.A. Guns album Shrinking Violet in the same year, as part of his solo band with the performance being released the same year as 99 Live. In 2002, Tracii contributed guitars on the Clarke's solo album Swag, with some of these tracks appearing on the 2007 compilation album Gilby Clarke. Also in 1999, Tracii released his debut album Killing Machine, which was later re-released in 2004 with the new title of All Eyes are Watchin'.

Guns was also in Poison for a short time in early 2000, when C.C. DeVille departed the band for a month over a dispute. Guns joined Quiet Riot in December 2005, a move that was to be short lived; he left less than a month later.

In 2004, Guns featured on the album The Roots of Guns N' Roses, the album featuring the original demos by Hollywood Rose, on tracks remixed by Gilby Clarke.

In 2007, Guns guested on the debut album Dopesnake by Hollywood Roses along with Mick Taylor formerly of The Rolling Stones, Phil Lewis and Paul Black both also of L.A. Guns, Gilby Clarke formerly of Guns N' Roses and Rock Star Supernova, Fred Coury of Cinderella and formerly of London, Teddy Andreadis, Pat Travers and Hollywood Rose founder Chris Weber.

In October 2008, Steven Adler had formed a new supergroup with Guns called Guns of Destruction. The band's lineup rounded up by Adler's Appetite and Enuff Z'Nuff bassist Chip Z'nuff and singer Eric Dover of Sextus and formerly of Jellyfish and Slash's Snakepit. They were to make their live debut at the Key Club in Hollywood on November, 19 with "very special guests" in attendance. However the group was to be short lived and Dover soon announced that he was not involved in the project.

After performing together at the "Giving 2010" benefit event on May 3, 2010, Guns formed the cover band "Carnival of Dogs" with Matt Sorum (Velvet Revolver, Camp Freddy, formerly of Guns N' Roses and The Cult), Franky Perez (Solo, Scars on Broadway, DKFXP, Apocalyptica) and Phil Soussan (formerly of Ozzy Osbourne, Billy Idol and Vince Neil).

In 2012, Guns worked with Italian producer Pietro Foresti on the song "America Dreaming" with Italian band J27.

In 2013, Guns joined the band of the production Raiding the Rock Vault at the Las Vegas Hotel and Casino.

In 2014 Guns formed the Devil City Angels, featuring Brandon Gibbs (Cheap Thrills) vocals, Rikki Rockett (Poison) drums & Eric Brittingham (Cinderella) Bass. The self-titled debut album was officially released September 11, 2015.

== Personal life ==
Ulrich has two sons. The elder, Jagger James Ulrich from his long-term relationship with fiancee Kristen, is named after Mick Jagger. His younger son, Ole Luk Ulrich with ex-wife Siri Luk, is named after bassist Ole Beich and his ex-wife's uncle, black metal guitarist Ole Luk. Ulrich has two signature guitars named after his sons.

Ulrich has jokingly referred to his bassist Jeremy Guns (born Jeremy Carson) as his son. Several media outlets have mistakenly reported that Jeremy is Ulrich's actual son.

== Discography ==
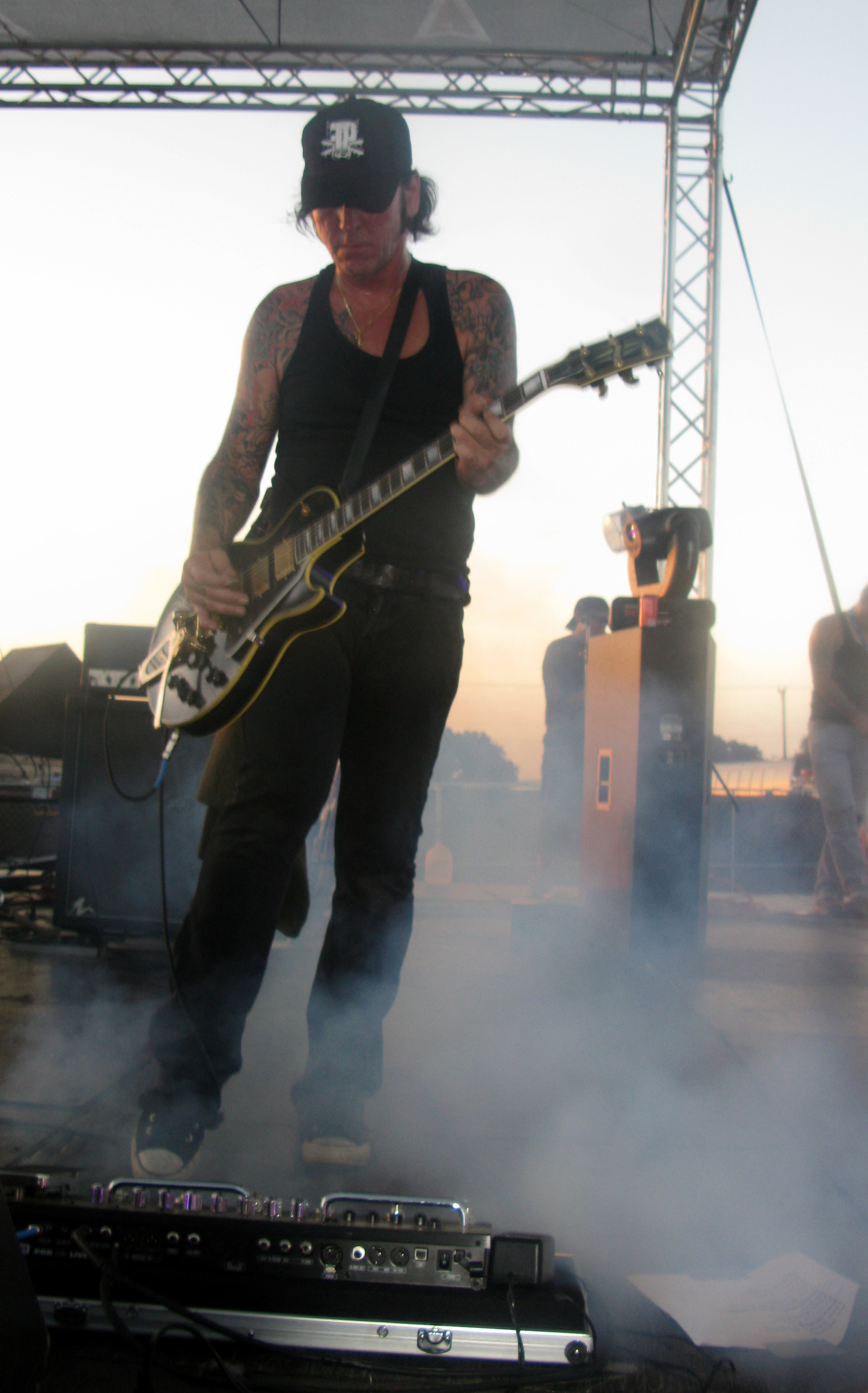
Guns in 2008

=== Solo ===
- Killing Machine (1994)

=== With L.A. Guns ===
- L.A. Guns (1988)
- Cocked & Loaded (1989)
- Hollywood Vampires (1991)
- Cuts (1992)
- Vicious Circle (1994)
- American Hardcore (1996)
- Wasted (1998)
- Shrinking Violet (1999)
- Man in the Moon (2001)
- Waking the Dead (2002)
- The Missing Peace (2017)
- The Devil You Know (2019)
- Checkered Past (2021)
- Black Diamonds (2023)
- Leopard Skin (2025)

=== With Contraband ===
- Contraband (1991)

=== With Gilby Clarke ===
- 99 Live (1999)
- Swag (2001) (tracks 1 & 2)
- Welcome to the Jungle: A Rock Tribute to Guns N' Roses (2002)

=== With Brides of Destruction ===
- Here Come the Brides (2004)
- Runaway Brides (2005)

=== With Tracii Guns' League of Gentlemen ===
- The First Record (2013)
- The Second Record (2014)

=== With Devil City Angels ===
- Devil City Angels (2015)

=== With Sunbomb ===
- Evil and Divine (2021)
- Light Up The Sky (2024)

=== With Blackbird Angels ===
- Solsorte (2023)

=== Guest credits ===
Year	Album title	Band	Record label	Credits
2004	The Roots of Guns N' Roses	Hollywood Rose	Cleopatra Records	Guitar overdubs on Gilby Clarke remixes
2007	Dopesnake	Hollywood Roses Not to be confused with Hollywood Rose	Abstract	Guitars on "Turbosheen" & "Come Down"
