= Rob Gardner (musician) =

American drummer

- Born: March 26, 1965 (age 61); New York City, New York
- Origin: Los Angeles, California, U.S.
- Genres: Hard rock; heavy metal
- Occupation: Musician
- Instruments: Drums; percussion; backing vocals
- Years active: 1976–present
- Label: Deadline
- Formerly of: L.A. Guns; Hollywood Rose; Guns N' Roses

Robert Gardner (born March 26, 1965) is an American musician best known as the drummer for the original lineups of L.A. Guns and Guns N' Roses, and was also the backup drummer for Hollywood Rose.

== Early life ==
Gardner was born in Manhattan, New York. His parents divorced when he was young and both had remarried. His father would move to Los Angeles, California in 1972, while his mother remained in New York. Gardner moved to live with his father and attended Fairfax High in 1979, where he met future L.A. Guns members Mike Jagosz and Tracy Ulrich. He also met future Hollywood Rose member Chris Weber as well as future Guns N' Roses members Saul Hudson and Steven Adler around this time.

Gardner and Ulrich decided to form a band, rehearsing in a garage at Gardner's father's house. Gardner suggested Jagosz as singer for the band. Originally in a band together called Pyrrhus alongside bassist Dani Tull, they would officially form L.A. Guns after the group hired Danish bassist Ole Beich to fill out the lineup. Gardner was 18 years old while, Jagosz and Ulrich were 17 years old at the formation of the band. He would also serve as the backup drummer for Hollywood Rose.

His drumming inspirations are John Bonham, Keith Moon, Neil Peart, Ginger Baker, Ian Paice, and Mitch Mitchell.

== L.A. Guns (1983–85) ==
L.A. Guns was first formed in 1983 by Gardner along with guitarist Tracii Guns, bassist Ole Beich, and vocalist Michael Jagosz. Jagosz was arrested and was briefly replaced by William Bailey. Michael Jagosz came back to with the group recording the only material by this original incarnation of L.A. Guns. The material would be released as a bonus disc, titled Collector's Edition No. 1 in 1985, with the compilation album Hollywood Raw in 2004. In 1985, Gardner was replaced by Nickey Alexander.

== Hollywood Rose, Guns N' Roses (1985) ==
Hollywood Rose reunited for a New Year's Eve concert in 1985, joined by Gardner and Tracii Guns. L.A. Guns would merge with Hollywood Rose, combining their names to become Guns N' Roses. The first lineup consisted of Gardner, Rose, Guns, Stradlin and Beich.

Duff McKagan replaced Beich and booked shows taking place between Sacramento and Seattle, which was dubbed "The Hell Tour". During this time, Gardner quit the group and was replaced by Steven Adler.

== Discography ==
with L.A. Guns

- Collector's Edition No. 1 (1985)
