= Collector's Edition No. 1 =

EP by L.A. Guns
- Released: 1985
- Recorded: 1984
- Studio: Westwind Studios (Thousand Oaks, California)
- Genre: Hard rock; glam metal
- Length: 13:14
- Label: Raz Records
- Producer: Chuck Rosa

L.A. Guns chronology
Collector's Edition No. 1 (1985)	L.A. Guns (1988)

Collector's Edition No. 1, (also known as L.A. Guns), is the debut extended play (EP) by American hard rock band L.A. Guns. Recorded in 1984 at Westwind Studios in Thousand Oaks, California, it was produced by Chuck Rosa and released in 1985 by Raz Records. The EP is the only release by the band to feature vocalist Michael Jagosz, bassist Ole Beich and drummer Rob Gardner, all of whom left shortly after its release (Guns, Beich and Gardner subsequently co-founded Guns N' Roses).

== Background ==
L.A. Guns recorded its debut EP at Westwind Studios in Thousand Oaks, California, a recording studio owned by former Rainbow and Black Sabbath frontman Ronnie James Dio. According to former vocalist Michael Jagosz, the group had only 24 hours available in the studio to record the EP, with "20–21 hours" used for the instrumentals and the remaining four used for vocals. The session was produced by Chuck Rosa and the EP released by the band's manager Raz Cue on his own label. Jagosz left shortly after the EP's release and was replaced by Paul Black, who would later rebuild the group after guitarist Tracii Guns, bassist Ole Beich and drummer Rob Gardner left to co-found Guns N' Roses with Hollywood Rose vocalist Axl Rose and guitarist Izzy Stradlin in March 1985.

The tracks recorded for Collector's Edition No. 1 have been re-released several times since 1985. First, in 2004, the songs were included as a bonus second disc with Hollywood Raw: The Original Sessions, a compilation containing several recordings from before the release of the band's self-titled debut album in 1988. In 2017, all four songs were also included on the career retrospective compilation A Fistful of Guns: Anthology 1985–2012.

== Track listing ==
No.	Title	Writer(s)	Length
1.	"Don't Love Me"	Tracii Guns, Mike Jagosz	4:36
2.	"When Dreams Don't Follow Through"	Guns, Jagosz	3:32
3.	"It's Not True"	Guns, Jagosz	2:44
4.	"Something Heavy"	Guns, Jagosz	2:22
Total length:			13:14

== Personnel ==
L.A. Guns

- Mike Jagosz – vocals
- Tracii Guns – guitar, production
- Ole Beich – bass
- Rob Gardner – drums

Additional personnel

- Chuck Rosa – production
- Tom Terranova – artwork, design
