= Live: A Night on the Strip =

Live! A Night on the Strip

Live album by L.A. Guns
- Released: February 8, 2000
- Recorded: October 7, 1999
- Genre: Hard rock
- Length: 58:23
- Label: Cleopatra Records

L.A. Guns chronology
Greatest Hits and Black Beauties (1999)	Live! A Night on the Strip (2000)	Cocked & Re-Loaded (2000)

Professional ratings
Review scores
Source	Rating
Allmusic	3/5 stars

Live: A Night on the Strip is a live recording by L.A. Guns which occurred October 7, 1999, at the Key Club on Sunset Boulevard in Hollywood.

== Track listing ==
1. "Face Down"
2. "Sex Actions
3. "One More Reason"
4. "Kiss My Love Goodbye"
5. "Bitch Is Back"
6. "Time"
7. "Long Time Dead"
8. "Over the Edge"
9. "Never Enough"
10. "Nothing Better to Do"
11. "Guitar Solo"
12. "Electric Gypsy"
13. "Ballad of Jayne"
14. "Rip N Tear"

== Personnel ==
- Phil Lewis - vocals
- Tracii Guns - guitar
- Mick Cripps - guitar
- Kelly Nickels - bass guitar
- Steve Riley - drums
