= Shrinking Violet (album) =

Studio album by L.A. Guns
- Released: June 1, 1999
- Genre: Hard rock; glam metal
- Length: 57:20
- Label: Perris
- Producer: Gilby Clarke

L.A. Guns chronology
Wasted (1998)	Shrinking Violet (1999)	Greatest Hits and Black Beauties (1999)

Alternative Cover
- Deluxe Reissue

Professional ratings
Review scores
Source	Rating
AllMusic	3.5/5 stars
Collector's Guide to Heavy Metal	7/10

Shrinking Violet is the sixth studio album by hard rock band L.A. Guns, first released on June 1, 1999, through Perris Records, and is the only L.A. Guns album with singer Jizzy Pearl. The album was reissued, with bonus tracks and new artwork, on May 24, 2010, through Favored Nations. The album was produced by former Guns N' Roses guitarist Gilby Clarke who also provided additional guitars on the track "Dreamtime".

== Track listing ==
All tracks are written by Jizzy Pearl, Tracii Guns, Johnny Crypt, Steve Riley, except where noted.

No.	Title	Writer(s)	Length
1.	"Girl You Turn Me On"		4:46
2.	"Shrinking Violet"		3:13
3.	"Dreamtime"	Guns, Riley	4:49
4.	"Barbed Wire"		5:48
5.	"I'll Be There"		3:59
6.	"California"		3:29
7.	"Cherries"		3:52
8.	"Decide"		5:42
9.	"Big Lil' Thing"		3:02
10.	"It's Hard"		4:47
11.	"Bad Whiskey"		5:02
12.	"How Many More Times" (Led Zeppelin cover)	John Bonham, John Paul Jones, Jimmy Page	8:51

Deluxe Reissue
No.	Title	Writer(s)	Length
1.	"Girl You Turn Me On"		4:46
2.	"Shrinking Violet"		3:13
3.	"Dreamtime"		4:49
4.	"Barbed Wire"		5:48
5.	"I'll Be There"		3:59
6.	"California"		3:29
7.	"Cherries"		3:52
8.	"Big Lil' Thing"		3:02
9.	"Bad Whiskey"		5:02
10.	"Decide" (live)		5:42
11.	"Rip and Tear" (live)	Phil Lewis, Guns, Mick Cripps, Riley	9:14
12.	"Never Enough" (live)	Paul Black, Lewis, Guns, Cripps, Riley	3:59
13.	"The Ballad of Jayne" (live)	Lewis, Guns, Cripps, Riley	4:47
14.	"One More Reason" (live)	Black, Lewis, Guns, Riley	3:30

== Personnel ==
- Jizzy Pearl - lead vocals
- Tracii Guns - guitars, theremin, arrangements
- Johnny Crypt - bass guitar, additional vocals, engineer
- Steve Riley - drums

Additional personnel

- Gilby Clarke - additional guitar on "Dreamtime", producer, engineer
- Teddy Andreadis - piano, synth and organ on "Dreamtime" and "Barbed Wire"
