= Hollywood Forever (album) =

Studio album by L.A. Guns
- Released: June 5, 2012
- Genre: Hard rock; glam metal
- Length: 55:12
- Label: Cleopatra
- Producer: Andy Johns

L.A. Guns chronology
Covered in Guns (2010)	Hollywood Forever (2012)	The Missing Peace (2017)

Singles from Hollywood Forever
- 1. "Araña Negra (Black Spider)" Released: 2012

Hollywood Forever is the 10th studio album by American hard rock band L.A. Guns. The album was produced by Andy Johns, and released on Cleopatra Records. The album was released as a CD, vinyl record and digital download.

Early work, including pre-production and songwriting, on the album began in late 2011, with recording beginning in early 2012 in Los Angeles. The album title was chosen by Phil Lewis to express the band's connection to the Los Angeles area in general and Hollywood in particular.

The album was one of the final albums to feature production work from Andy Johns, who died in the spring of 2013.

== Track listing ==
The track listing for Hollywood Forever is as follows; the iTunes version of the album will also include unidentified bonus tracks:

No.	Title	Length
1.	"Hollywood Forever"	4:42
2.	"You Better Not Love Me"	4:17
3.	"Eel Pie"	2:40
4.	"Sweet Mystery"	4:01
5.	"Burn"	4:01
6.	"Vine St. Shimmy"	2:48
7.	"Dirty Black Night"	4:50
8.	"Underneath The Sun"	4:40
9.	"Queenie"	3:44
10.	"Crazy Tango"	4:40
11.	"Venus Bomb"	2:36
12.	"I Won't Play"	3:09
13.	"Requiem (Hollywood Forever)"	4:05
14.	"Araña Negra (Black Spider)" (Cover of The Bicicletas song)	4:59
15.	"Rattlesnake (Bonus)"
Total length:		55:12

== Personnel ==
- Phil Lewis – lead vocals
- Stacey Blades – guitar
- Scott Griffin – bass guitar (except on “Venus Bomb”) and keyboards
- Steve Riley – drums

Additional personnel

- Kelly Nickels – bass guitar on "Venus Bomb"

The band recorded music videos for the songs "You Better Not Love Me," "Requiem (Hollywood Forever)" and "Araña Negra."

== Charts ==
Chart (2012)	Peak position
US Top Hard Rock Albums (Billboard)	42
