= McGuffy's =

Coordinates: 39°45′28.4″N 84°06′39.8″W

McGuffy's, also known as McGuffy's House of Draft and McGuffy's House of Rock, was a 550-capacity music venue located at 5418 Burkhardt Road in Dayton, Ohio. The club opened in 1981 and closed in 2014. It hosted notable bands such as Quiet Riot, Saxon, UFO, Blue Öyster Cult, Dio and Dream Theater. The venue was sold in 2014 and now operates under new management under the name Oddbody's.
