= Wasted (EP) =

EP by L.A. Guns
- Released: September 15, 1998
- Studio: Red Zone (Burbank, California)
- Genre: Hard rock; glam metal
- Length: 30:26
- Label: StandBack
- Producer: L.A. Guns; Denis Degher

L.A. Guns chronology
Hollywood Rehearsal (1997)	Wasted (1998)	Shrinking Violet (1999)

Wasted is an extended play (EP) by American hard rock band L.A. Guns. Recorded at Red Zone Studios in Burbank, California, it was co-produced by the band with recording and mixing engineer Denis Degher, and released on September 15, 1998, by StandBack Entertainment. The EP features four new tracks, a re-recording of "The Ballad of Jayne" and a cover version of the Kiss song "Cold Gin". It is the only L.A. Guns release to feature vocalist Ralph Saenz.

== Background ==
Released on September 15, 1998, Wasted features four new songs (including the title track), a re-recording of the Cocked & Loaded single "The Ballad of Jayne", and a cover version of the Kiss track "Cold Gin". The EP is the only release by the band on the StandBack Entertainment record label, as well as their only release to feature the lineup of lead vocalist Ralph Saenz, guitarist Tracii Guns, bassist Johnny Crypt and drummer Steve Riley. Saenz left the band halfway through the Rock Never Stops Tour in 1998, to be replaced by Joe Lesté and later Jizzy Pearl.

== Reception ==
Professional ratings
Review scores
Source	Rating
AllMusic	2/5 stars
Collector's Guide to Heavy Metal	7/10

Reviewing the EP for music website AllMusic, Jason Anderson described Wasted as "a little bland and predictable", accusing L.A. Guns of adopting "a kind of Alice in Chains vibe that many hard rockers uncertain how to proceed through the decade of grunge/alternative adopted in a limp attempt at timeliness". Anderson described the material on Wasted as "slightly heavier" than the band's earlier work, but claimed that "there isn't anything gained through the musician's efforts".

== Track listing ==
No.	Title	Writer(s)	Length
1.	"Wasted"	Tracii Guns; Ralph Saenz; Johnny Crypt; Steve Riley	4:21
2.	"Well Spent"	Guns; Saenz; Crypt; Riley	4:06
3.	"Heavy Head"	Guns; Saenz; Crypt; Riley	5:11
4.	"Forgiving Eyes"	Guns; Saenz; Crypt; Riley	6:31
5.	"Jayne '98"	Guns; Phil Lewis; Mick Cripps; Kelly Nickels; Riley	5:04
6.	"Cold Gin" (Kiss cover)	Ace Frehley	5:13
Total length:			30:26

== Personnel ==
L.A. Guns

- Ralph Saenz – lead vocals, production
- Tracii Guns – guitar, backing vocals, production, mixing
- Johnny Crypt – bass, backing vocals, production, artwork, design, layout
- Steve Riley – drums, backing vocals, production

Additional personnel

- Denis Degher – production, engineering, mixing
- Ron McMaster – mastering
- Gideon Culman – photography
- Jeffrey Fiterman – photography
