= The Missing Peace (album) =

Album by L.A. Guns

Studio album by L.A. Guns
- Released: October 13, 2017
- Recorded: 2017
- Genre: Glam metal
- Length: 51:22
- Label: Frontiers
- Producer: Tracii Guns

L.A. Guns chronology
Hollywood Forever (2012)	The Missing Peace (2017)	Made in Milan (2018)

Singles from The Missing Peace
- 1. "Speed" Released: 2017; 2. "Sticky Fingers" Released: 2017; 3. "Christine" Released: 2017; 4. "Baby Gotta Fever" Released: 2017

Professional ratings
Review scores
Source	Rating
Blabbermouth.net	9/10
Louder	3.5/5 stars
New Noise Magazine	3.5/5 stars
The Rockpit	—

The Missing Peace is the eleventh studio album by American hard rock band L.A. Guns. Released on October 13, 2017, through Frontiers Music Srl, it can be considered a reunion recording, as it is the first album of new material featuring both lead guitarist Tracii Guns and lead singer Phil Lewis in 15 years. It is the only studio album with the rhythm guitarist Michael Grant.

The track listing was revealed on their Facebook page. The album debuted on the U.S. Top Hard Rock Albums chart at number 16.

The first single, "Speed", as well as an accompanying video, was released by Frontiers Music Srl on July 12, 2017.

== Track listing ==
All songs written by Tracii Guns, Phil Lewis, Michael Grant, Johnny Martin, Shane Fitzgibbon, and Mitch Davis, except "The Devil Made Me Do It" written by Michael Grant, Kenny Kweens, and Lonny Paul Johnson.

No.	Title	Length
1.	"It's All the Same to Me"	4:27
2.	"Speed"	3:41
3.	"A Drop of Bleach"	4:02
4.	"Sticky Fingers"	5:00
5.	"Christine"	4:09
6.	"Baby Gotta Fever"	3:37
7.	"Kill It or Die"	3:59
8.	"Don't Bring a Knife to a Gunfight"	3:47
9.	"The Flood's the Fault of the Rain"	5:09
10.	"The Devil Made Me Do It"	3:21
11.	"The Missing Peace"	4:44
12.	"Gave It All Away"	5:24

Japanese bonus track
No.	Title	Length
13.	"Christine" (acoustic)

== Personnel ==
- Phil Lewis – lead vocals
- Tracii Guns – lead guitar
- Michael Grant – rhythm guitar
- Johnny Martin – bass
- Shane Fitzgibbon – drums

== Charts ==
Chart (2017)	Peak position
Japanese Albums (Oricon)	114
UK Rock & Metal Albums (OCC)	18
US Top Album Sales (Billboard)	52
US Top Hard Rock Albums (Billboard)	16
US Independent Albums (Billboard)	12
US Indie Store Album Sales (Billboard)	21
