= Scott Griffin (musician) =

American musician

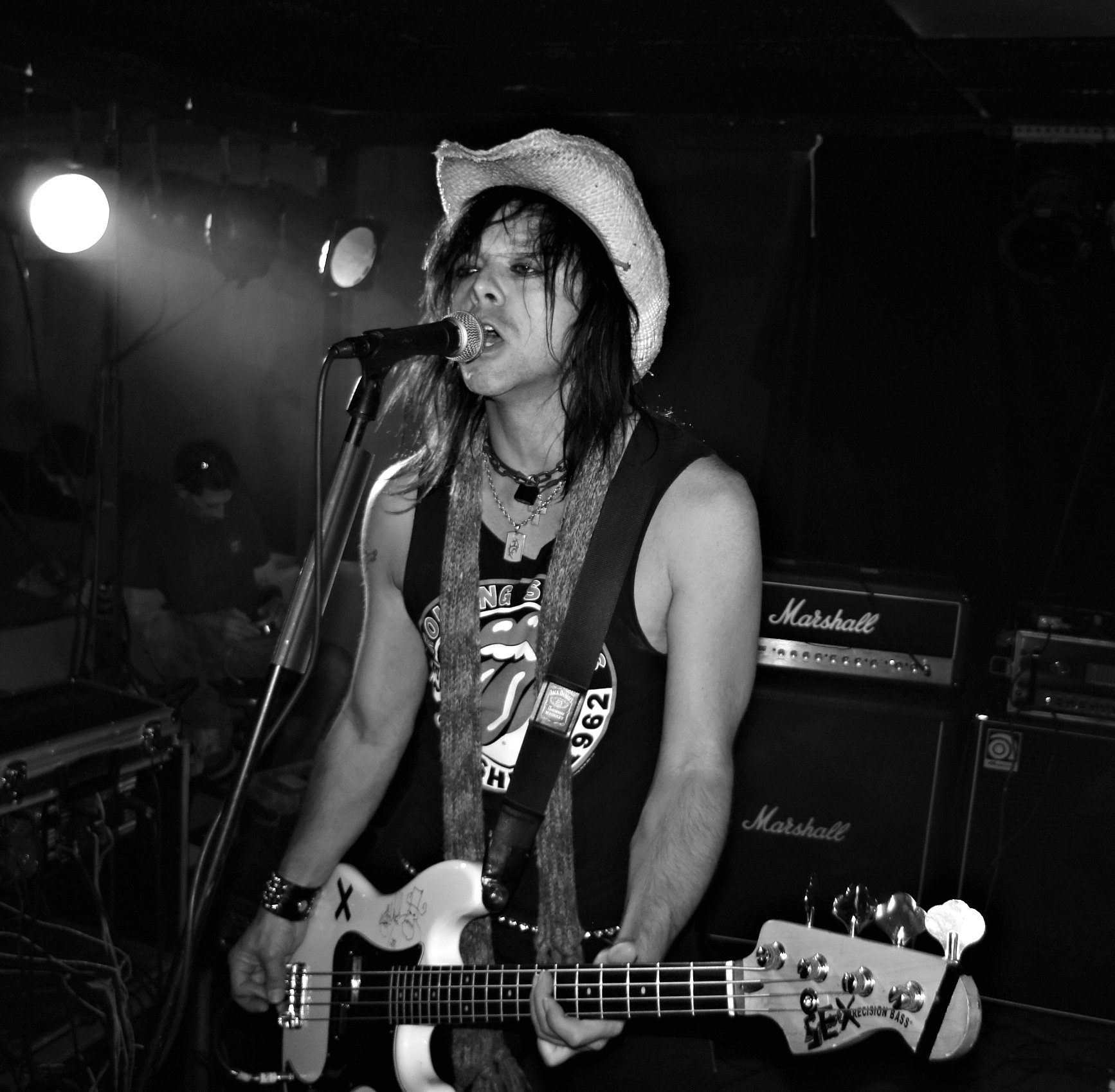
- Griffin performing in 2011

Background information
- Genres: Hard rock, heavy metal, glam metal
- Occupation(s): Musician, songwriter
- Instrument(s): Bass, guitar

Scott Griffin is an American musician who is best known as a former bassist for L.A. Guns and Ratt. In 2007, Griffin was announced as the bassist for L.A. Guns, having previously played in Dizzy Reed's cover band Hookers N' Blow, replacing Adam Hamilton. From 2015 until April 1, 2016, Griffin was the bassist of a revamped version of Ratt, led by drummer Bobby Blotzer.

After one of Griffin's side-projects, The King Mixers, were offered a residency in Las Vegas in 2009, he left the group and was replaced by former Beautiful Creatures bassist Kenny Kweens. In 2011, he re-joined L.A. Guns, but departed the group once again in September 2014. Griffin is currently the lead guitarist for Steve Riley's version of L.A. Guns, alongside Riley on drums, bassist Kelly Nickels and vocalist/guitarist Kurt Frohlich.
