= Ole Beich =

Danish musician

- Beich, circa 1982

Background information
- Born: January 1, 1955; Esbjerg, Denmark
- Origin: Los Angeles
- Died: October 16, 1991 (aged 36) Copenhagen, Denmark
- Genres: Hard rock, heavy metal
- Occupation: Musician
- Instruments: Bass, Guitar
- Years active: 1979–1989
- Label: Deadline
- Formerly of: Rock Nalle & The Flames; Mercyful Fate; L.A. Guns; Guns N' Roses; Forgotten Child

Ole Beich (January 1, 1955 – October 16, 1991) was a Danish musician best known as the bass guitarist for the original lineups of L.A. Guns and Guns N' Roses.

== Early life ==
Born in the city of Esbjerg, Beich, in his youth, achieved a degree of fame amongst local musicians and fans. He played guitar with several Danish bands, and recorded an album in 1979 with a band called Rock Nalle & The Flames. He was also a member of Mercyful Fate for a brief time, before deciding to move to Los Angeles in pursuit of a career in music.

== Career ==
=== L.A. Guns (1983–1985) ===
L.A. Guns were first formed in 1983 by guitarist Tracii Guns and drummer Rob Gardner. The first lineup included Guns, Beich, Gardner and singer Michael Jagosz. The band recorded an EP Collector's Edition No. 1. Shortly after, Jagosz left the band following an arrest involving a bar fight and was replaced by Bill Bailey (who would later change his name to Axl Rose). Bailey had previously fronted Rapidfire with Kevin Lawrence and Hollywood Rose with Izzy Stradlin and Chris Weber. Jagosz came back after Rose left playing with the band for two weeks and five shows.

When L.A. Guns was reformed in 1985, Beich was replaced by Mick Cripps.

=== Guns N' Roses (1985) ===
Hollywood Rose reformed for a New Year's Eve show on New Year's Eve 1984, with Rose, Stradlin, Guns, Gardner and Steve Darrow. In March 1985 L.A. Guns merged with Hollywood Rose, changing their name to Guns N' Roses (combining the names of L.A. Guns and Hollywood Rose) with the lineup composed of Rose, Guns, Stradlin, Beich and Gardner.

Following two rehearsals, Beich was fired from the band. He was replaced by Duff McKagan. Tracii Guns left the group; he was replaced by Slash. McKagan went on to book shows taking place between Sacramento and Seattle, which was dubbed “The Hell Tour“. During this time, Gardner quit the group and was replaced by Steven Adler. Rose, Stradlin, McKagan, Slash, and Adler became known as the "classic lineup" of Guns N' Roses.

== Death ==
Beich died on October 16, 1991, drowning in Sankt Jørgens Lake in the center of Copenhagen. Not long before, on August 19, Guns N' Roses had performed in the city. His family believed that he became depressed after leaving Guns N' Roses in 1985 and was heavily abusing drugs before returning to Denmark in 1988. Heroin, and a blood alcohol content of .148, are thought to have contributed to his drowning, but his family still believes it was suicide.

Beich is buried in Esbjerg next to his father Aksel, who died in 1995.

== Discography ==
with Rock Nalle & The Flames

- Rock 'N'alle Roll (1979)

with L.A. Guns

- Collector's Edition No. 1 (1985)
