= Scott Foster Harris =

American singer-songwriter

- Also known as: SFH; Scott Foster Harris Band
- Origin: Dallas, Texas, U.S.
- Genres: Rock; future funk; ghost rock; blues; psychedelic rock; groove rock; funk rock
- Years active: 2006–present
- Website: scottfosterharris.com

Scott Foster Harris is an American blues/rock singer, songwriter, and multi-instrumentalist based out of Los Angeles, California and Vienna, Austria. Harris began as a solo artist before forming the psychedelic/blues/rock group Zen Rizing. After Zen ended in 2011 he joined L.A. Guns, respectively with Tracii Guns of Guns N' Roses, as the new frontman. Since 2014 he has been concentrating on his solo musical aspirations and is continuing to build his career based around his enthusiasm for his soulful, poetic brand of futuristic blues/funk/groove/rock.

== History ==
Scott Foster Harris, born in Houston, Texas, and raised in Dallas, Texas, became a professional musician at the age of nineteen. While healing from an injury he sustained as a rodeo bull rider, he began writing music and poetry along with a variety of other creative avenues, including acting. Temporarily unable to ride, he began teaching himself to play multiple instruments and, almost immediately, began writing, singing, and performing songs.

Briefly, Harris toured Texas and Oklahoma as a singer/songwriter. He then moved to Nashville, Tennessee to pursue a career as a writer. Once there, he landed a publishing deal with Amylase Music; his earliest songs were cut by artists such as Stephen Cochran, Todd O'Neil and Vinny Van Zant of Trailer Choir. After leaving Amylase he began recording and performing with the rock band Seventy-Seven. However, a short while later he began to create and perform his own music which would eventually become the debut album for Zen Rizing.

He put his band Zen Rizing together and shortly thereafter moved them all out to Los Angeles. Almost immediately they achieved notoriety and success due to accomplishing such feats as winning an LA Music Award for 'rock single of the year' for their tune "Heaven in Your Eyes", establishing a residency at the Whisky a Go Go, receiving airplay on 95.5, opening for Ray Manzarek and Robbie Krieger of The Doors, and becoming regular fixtures on such stages as The House of Blues and The Roxy.

In late 2011, Zen Rizing called it quits for personal/family reasons stemming from two of the band members, thus leaving Harris without his band. He then took the job as frontman for LA Guns and started recording an album, The First Record, with the Tracii Guns' League of Gentlemen for Shrapnel Records. After many tours throughout Europe and the States and after finishing two albums with the League of Gentlemen, the second aptly titled The Second Record, Harris decided to split his time between the America and Europe and thus became a part-time resident of Vienna, Austria as well as Los Angeles. In Europe, Harris landed several songs on Austria's charts via the Wild Style Tattoo Messe album, as well as opened for such artists as Neil Young.

He is currently writing and recording the debut album to his newly formed, self-titled solo project, consisting of his blues/funk/groove/rock inclinations while in Vienna.
