= L.A. Guns discography =

Discography of American band

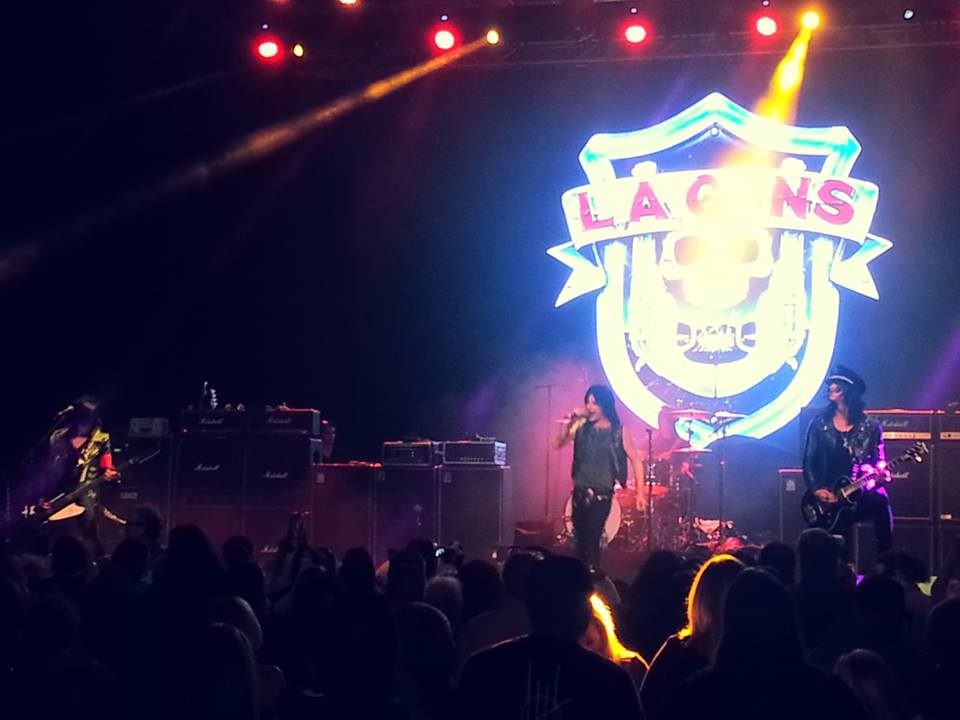
- L.A. Guns performing in 2015
- Studio albums: 15
- Extended plays: 4
- Live albums: 9
- Compilation albums: 13
- Singles: 29
- Video albums: 6
- Music videos: 25

The discography of L.A. Guns, an American hard rock band, consists of 17 studio releases (15 original studio albums, 2 cover albums and 1 re-recorded album), 9 live albums, 13 compilation albums, 4 extended plays, 27 singles, 6 video albums and 25 music videos. After some early lineup changes, the group – consisting of vocalist Phil Lewis, lead guitarist Tracii Guns, rhythm guitarist Mick Cripps, bassist Kelly Nickels and drummer Nickey Alexander – signed with PolyGram and released its self-titled debut album in 1988. It reached number 50 on the US Billboard 200 and was certified gold by the Recording Industry Association of America (RIAA). Alexander was replaced by Steve Riley, and the 1989 follow-up Cocked & Loaded reached number 38 on the Billboard 200. The single "The Ballad of Jayne" gave L.A. Guns its debut on the Hot 100, reaching number 33.

Hollywood Vampires, released in 1991, reached number 42 on the Billboard 200. Three of the album's four singles charted on the Mainstream Rock chart, and "It's Over Now" charted at number 62 on the Hot 100. After the band's fourth album Vicious Circle failed to chart in the US, L.A. Guns was dropped by PolyGram and went through a number of lineup changes, with Lewis, Cripps and Nickels leaving in 1995. The band continued to issue new albums throughout the 1990s, with limited commercial success. The group also went through a long line of personnel changes: 1996's American Hardcore featured new vocalist Chris Van Dahl and bassist Johnny Crypt, the 1998 EP Wasted featured Crypt and vocalist Ralph Saenz, and 1999's Shrinking Violet featured Crypt and vocalist Jizzy Pearl.

The classic lineup of Lewis, Guns, Cripps, Nickels and Riley reunited in 1999 to record Cocked & Re-Loaded, a new version of the group's second album. 2001's Man in the Moon featured Mark "Muddy Stardust" Dutton on bass, and 2002's Waking the Dead was recorded by a four-piece lineup of Lewis, Guns, Riley and Adam Hamilton, after which founding member Guns left the band. After three albums without the guitarist, Lewis and Guns reunited for the first time since 2002 in 2016. In 2017 the band released The Missing Peace, which reached number 16 on the Billboard Hard Rock Albums chart and number 12 on the Independent Albums chart. The Devil You Know was released as the album's follow-up in March 2019. Checkered Past was released on November 21, 2021. Tracii Guns' version of the band released Black Diamonds in 2023. Steve Riley's version of the band released The Dark Horse on July 14, 2023. Leopard Skin was released in April 4, 2025.

== Albums ==
=== Studio albums ===
List of studio albums, with selected chart positions and certifications
Title	Album details	Peak chart positions										Certifications
Title	Album details	US	US Hard	US Indie	US Sales	AUS	CAN	JPN	SWI	UK	UK Rock	Certifications
L.A. Guns	Released: January 4, 1988; Label: Vertigo; Formats: CD, LP, CS	50	—	—	—	—	88	67	—	73	—	RIAA: Gold
Cocked & Loaded	Released: August 22, 1989; Label: Vertigo; Formats: CD, LP, CS	38	—	—	—	—	—	23	—	45	—	RIAA: Gold
Hollywood Vampires	Released: June 25, 1991; Label: Polydor; Formats: CD, LP, CS	42	—	—	42	91	—	20	28	44	—	
Vicious Circle	Released: October 4, 1994; Label: Polydor; Formats: CD, CS	—	—	—	—	—	—	58	—	—	13	
American Hardcore	Released: October 29, 1996; Label: CMC International; Formats: CD, CS	—	—	—	—	—	—	—	—	—	—	
Shrinking Violet	Released: June 1, 1999; Label: Perris; Format: CD	—	—	—	—	—	—	—	—	—	—	
Man in the Moon	Released: April 24, 2001; Label: Spitfire; Format: CD	—	—	—	—	—	—	—	—	—	—	
Waking the Dead	Released: August 20, 2002; Label: Spitfire; Format: CD	—	—	—	—	—	—	—	—	—	—	
Tales from the Strip	Released: August 16, 2005; Label: Shrapnel; Format: CD	—	—	—	—	—	—	—	—	—	—	
Hollywood Forever	Released: June 5, 2012; Label: Deadline; Formats: CD, LP, DL	—	25	—	—	—	—	—	—	—	—	
The Missing Peace	Released: October 13, 2017; Label: Frontiers; Formats: CD, LP, DL	—	16	12	52	—	—	114	—	—	18	
The Devil You Know	Released: March 29, 2019; Label: Frontiers; Formats: CD, LP, DL	—	—	10	45	—	—	179	—	—	12	
Checkered Past	Released: November 12, 2021; Label: Frontiers; Formats: CD, LP, DL	—	—	—	—	—	—	—	—	—	—	
Black Diamonds	Released: April 14, 2023; Label: Frontiers; Formats: CD, LP, DL	—	—	—	—	—	—	—	—	—	—	
Leopard Skin	Released: April 4, 2025; Label: Cleopatra; Formats: CD, LP, DL	—	—	—	—	—	—	—	—	—	—	
"—" denotes a release that did not chart or was not issued in that region.

=== Cover albums ===
List of cover albums
Title	Album details
Rips the Covers Off	Released: April 27, 2004; Label: Shrapnel; Format: CD
Covered in Guns	Released: February 23, 2010; Label: Frontiers; Formats: CD

=== Re-recording albums ===
List of re-recording albums
Title	Album details
Cocked & Re-Loaded	Released: 2000; Label: Shrapnel; Format: CD

=== Live albums ===
List of live albums, with selected chart position
Title	Album details	Peak
Title	Album details	JPN
Live! Vampires (released in Japan only)	Released: March 16, 1992; Label: Vertigo; Format: CD	91
Live! A Night on the Strip	Released: February 8, 2000; Label: Deadline; Format: CD	—
Loud & Dangerous: Live from Hollywood	Released: September 12, 2006; Label: Shrapnel; Format: CD	—
Hellraiser's Ball: Caught in the Act	Released: June 17, 2008; Label: Dream Catcher; Format: CD	—
Extended Versions	Released: 2010; Label: Sony; Format: CD	—
Acoustic Gypsy Live	Released: September 27, 2011; Label: Favored Nations; Formats: CD, DL	—
Boston 1989	Released: November 18, 2014; Label: Deadline; Formats: CD, LP, DL	—
Toronto 1990	Released: March 17, 2015; Label: Deadline; Formats: CD, DL	—
Made in Milan	Released: March 23, 2018; Label: Frontiers; Formats: CD, LP, DL	—
Cocked and Loaded Live	Released: July 9, 2021; Label: Frontiers; Formats: CD, LP, DL	—
"—" denotes a release that did not chart or was not issued in that region.

=== Compilations ===
List of compilation albums
Title	Album details
Best Of: Hollywood a Go-Go (released in Japan only)	Released: April 5, 1996; Label: Mercury; Format: CD
Hollywood Rehearsal (released in Japan only)	Released: 1997; Label: Digital Uni; Format: CD
Greatest Hits and Black Beauties	Released: June 1, 1999; Label: Deadline; Format: CD
Black City Breakdown (1985–1986) (credited to Paul Black's L.A. Guns)	Released: 2000; Label: Black City; Format: CD
Ultimate L.A. Guns	Released: September 3, 2002; Label: Deadline; Format: CD
Fully Loaded: Greatest Hits	Released: November 18, 2003; Label: Direct Source; Format: CD
Hollywood Raw: The Original Sessions	Released: October 26, 2004; Label: Deadline; Format: 2CD
The Best of L.A. Guns	Released: April 12, 2005; Label: Polydor; Format: CD
Black List (credited to Paul Black's L.A. Guns)	Released: 2005; Label: Black City; Format: CD
Sex, Booze N' Tattoos	Released: November 20, 2007; Label: Cleopatra; Format: LP
'86 Demo Sessions	Released: June 2, 2009; Label: Cleopatra; Format: LP
Riot on Sunset: The Best Of	Released: 2012; Label: Deadline; Format: LP
A Fistful of Guns: Anthology 1985–2012	Released: February 3, 2017; Label: Deadline; Formats: 2CD, DL

== Extended plays ==
List of extended plays
Title	EP details
Collector's Edition No. 1	Released: 1985; Label: Raz; Format: 12" vinyl
Holiday Foreplay	Released: November 1991; Label: Polydor; Format: CD
Cuts	Released: December 2, 1992; Label: Polydor; Formats: CD, CS
Wasted	Released: September 15, 1998; Label: StandBack; Format: CD
Another Xmas in Hell	Released: December 6, 2019; Label: Frontiers Records; Format: MP3 File

== Singles ==
List of singles, with selected chart positions, showing year released and album name
Title	Year	Chart peaks			Album
Title	Year	US	US Main.	UK	Album
"Electric Gypsy"	1988	—	—	—	L.A. Guns
"One More Reason"	1988	—	—	—	L.A. Guns
"Sex Action"	1988	—	—	—	L.A. Guns
"Rip and Tear"	1989	—	47	—	Cocked & Loaded
"Never Enough"	1989	—	—	—	Cocked & Loaded
"The Ballad of Jayne"	1989	33	25	53	Cocked & Loaded
"I Wanna Be Your Man"	1989	—	—	—	Cocked & Loaded
"Malaria"	1989	—	—	—	Cocked & Loaded
"Kiss My Love Goodbye"	1991	—	16	—	Hollywood Vampires
"Some Lie 4 Love"	1991	—	48	61	Hollywood Vampires
"Over the Edge"	1991	—	—	—	Hollywood Vampires
"It's Over Now"	1991	62	25	—	Hollywood Vampires
"Long Time Dead"	1994	—	—	—	Vicious Circle
"Face Down"	1994	—	—	—	Vicious Circle
"Killing Machine"	1994	—	—	—	Vicious Circle
"Man in the Moon"	2001	—	—	—	Man in the Moon
"Crazy Bitch"	2007	—	—	—	Bumps & Rails
"Let It Rock"	2008	—	—	—	Non-album single
"Araña Negra (Black Spider)"	2012	—	—	—	Hollywood Forever
"Gorgeous Georgie"	2014	—	—	—	Singles Going Home Alone #1
"Speed"	2017	—	—	—	The Missing Peace
"Sticky Fingers"	2017	—	—	—	The Missing Peace
"Christine"	2017	—	—	—	The Missing Peace
"Baby Gotta Fever"	2017	—	—	—	The Missing Peace
"No Mercy" (live)	2018	—	—	—	Made in Milan
"Speed" (live)	2018	—	—	—	Made in Milan
"Stay Away"	2019	—	—	—	The Devil You Know
"Rage"	2019	—	—	—	The Devil You Know
"Crawl"	2020	—	—	—	Renegades
"Let You Down"	2020	—	—	—	Checkered Past
"Well Oiled Machine"	2020	—	—	—	Renegades
"Renegades"	2020	—	—	—	Renegades
"All That You Are"	2020	—	—	—	Renegades
"Knock Me Down"	2021	—	—	—	Checkered Past
"Cannonball"	2021	—	—	—	Checkered Past
"Get Along"	2021	—	—	—	Checkered Past
"Rewind"	2022	—	—	—	The Dark Horse
"You Betray"	2023	—	—	—	Black Diamonds
"Rewind"	2023	—	—	—	The Dark Horse
"Shattered Glass"	2023	—	—	—	Black Diamonds
"The Dark Horse"	2023	—	—	—	The Dark Horse
"—" denotes a release that did not chart or was not issued in that region.

== Videos ==
=== Video albums ===
List of video albums, with selected chart position and certifications
Title	Album details	Peak	Certifications
Title	Album details	US	Certifications
One More Reason	Released: August 1989; Label: PolyGram; Format: VHS	19	RIAA: Gold
Love, Peace & Geese	Released: October 1990; Label: PolyGram; Format: VHS	23	
Hellraiser's Ball: Caught in the Act	Released: August 6, 2004; Label: Secret; Format: DVD	—	
The Hollywood Years: Live & Loaded	Released: June 5, 2007; Label: Deadline; Format: DVD	—	
Live in Concert	Released: February 12, 2013; Label: Deadline; Format: DVD	—	
Made in Milan	Released: March 23, 2018; Label: Frontiers; Formats: Blu-ray, DVD	—	
"—" denotes a release that did not chart or was not issued in that region.

=== Music videos ===
List of music videos, showing year released and director(s) names
Title	Year	Director(s)	Ref.
"One More Reason"	1988	Ralph Ziman	
"Sex Action"	1988	Ralph Ziman	
"Electric Gypsy"	1988	Ralph Ziman	
"One Way Ticket"	1988	Phillip Detchmendy	
"Cry No More"	1989	Phillip Detchmendy	
"Cry No More" (solo version)	1989	Katy Lynne, Ralph Ziman	
"Bitch Is Back"	1989	Katy Lynne, Ralph Ziman	
"No Mercy" (live)	1989	Katy Lynne, Ralph Ziman	
"Nothing to Lose"	1989	Katy Lynne, Ralph Ziman	
"Rip and Tear"	1989	Jeff Zimmerman	
"Never Enough"	1989	unknown	
"The Ballad of Jayne"	1990	Ralph Ziman	
"I Wanna Be Your Man"	1990	unknown	
"Malaria"	1990	Ralph Ziman	
"Some Lie 4 Love"	1991	unknown	
"Kiss My Love Goodbye"	1991	Rocky Schneck	
"It's Over Now"	1991	Rocky Schneck	
"Over the Edge"	1991	unknown	
"Long Time Dead"	1994	unknown	
"Tie Your Mother Down"	2005	Sean Fodor	
"You Better Not Love Me"	2012	Jack Foster	
"Araña Negra (Black Spider)"	2012	Jack Foster	
"Requiem (Hollywood Forever)"	2013	Jack Foster	
"Speed"	2017	Pablo Aura	
"The Flood's the Fault of the Rain"	2017	Wayne Joyner	

== Other appearances ==
List of other appearances, showing year released and album name
Title	Year	Album	Ref.
"Around and Around" (The Rolling Stones cover)	1996	Shared Vision 2: The Songs of the Rolling Stones	
"Cold Gin" (Kiss cover)	1997	Return of the Comet: A Tribute to Ace Frehley	
"Ain't Talkin' 'Bout Love" (Van Halen cover)	1999	Killing Machine (Tracii Guns solo album)	
"Atomic Punk" (Van Halen cover)	1999	Hot for Remixes: A Tribute to Van Halen	
"Run Run Rudolph" (Chuck Berry cover)	2003	We Wish You a Hairy Christmas	
"Wanted Dead or Alive" (Bon Jovi cover)	2006	Monster Metal Power Ballads	
"Billion Dollar Babies" (Alice Cooper cover with George Lynch)	2007	Guitar Slinger	
"Crazy Bitch" (Buckcherry cover)	2008	Bumps & Rails (Hot Wax Drippin')	
"Living After Midnight" (Judas Priest cover)	2008	Hell Bent Forever: A Tribute to Judas Priest	
"Piece of Your Action" (Mötley Crüe cover)	2008	Crüe Believers: A Tribute to Mötley Crüe	
"Angel of the Morning" (Chip Taylor cover with Juice Newton)	2008	The Hits Reloaded	
"Pour Some Sugar on Me" (Def Leppard cover)	2009	This Is Mullet Rock (reissue)	
"Little St. Nick" (The Beach Boys cover)	2009	An All-Star Salute to Christmas	
"We Will Rock You" (Queen cover)	2015	Keep Calm and Salute Queen	
