= Live! Vampires =

Live album by L.A. Guns
- Released: March 16, 1992
- Recorded: August 1991
- Venue: Sunken Gardens (San Antonio, Texas); Irvine Meadows Amphitheatre (Irvine, California)
- Genre: Hard rock; glam metal
- Length: 39:04
- Label: Vertigo
- Producer: L.A. Guns; Michael James Jackson

L.A. Guns chronology
Holiday Foreplay (1991)	Live! Vampires (1992)	Cuts (1992)

Live! Vampires is the first live album by American hard rock band L.A. Guns. Recorded in August 1991 at two shows in the United States, it was self-produced by the band and released in Japan only on February 26, 1992, by Vertigo Records. The majority of songs performed on the album are from the band's third studio album Hollywood Vampires, plus one each from L.A. Guns and Cocked & Loaded. Live! Vampires registered at number 91 on the Japanese Albums Chart.

== Background ==
Released on March 16, 1992, Live! Vampires is a Japanese-only EP featuring six live tracks and two outtakes. All tracks except "One More Reason" were recorded at Irvine Meadows Amphitheatre in Irvine, California; "One More Reason" was recorded at Sunken Gardens in San Antonio, Texas. The two live outtakes – "It's Over Now" and "Crystal Eyes" – were produced by Hollywood Vampires producer and recording engineer Michael James Jackson.

Live! Vampires charted in the only region it was released, reaching number 91 on the Japanese Albums Chart. In his 2014 book HAIRcyclopedia Vol. 1: The Legends, Taylor T. Carlson claimed that Live! Vampires was the best L.A. Guns live release, claiming that it "captures the band back in their heyday, right before grunge took over and changed the music industry". Bradley Torreano of the music website AllMusic awarded the album 3.5 out of five stars.

== Track listing ==
All tracks are written by Tracii Guns, Phil Lewis, Mick Cripps, Kelly Nickels and Steve Riley, except where noted.

No.	Title	Writer(s)	Length
1.	"Kiss My Love Goodbye"		5:08
2.	"Wild Obsession"		4:24
3.	"Dirty Luv"		4:16
4.	"Rip and Tear"		6:07
5.	"One More Reason"	Guns; Lewis; Paul Black	4:02
6.	"Some Lie for Love"		3:43
7.	"It's Over Now"		4:14
8.	"Crystal Eyes"		7:10
Total length:			39:04

== Personnel ==
L.A. Guns

- Phil Lewis – lead vocals, production
- Tracii Guns – lead guitar, backing vocals, production
- Mick Cripps – rhythm guitar, backing vocals, production
- Kelly Nickels – bass, backing vocals, production
- Steve Riley – drums, backing vocals, production

Additional personnel

- Michael James Jackson – production (tracks 7 and 8)

== Chart positions ==
Chart (1992)	Peak position
Japanese Albums (Oricon)	91
