= Holiday Foreplay =

EP by L.A. Guns
- Released: November 1991
- Recorded: August 1991
- Venue: Sunken Gardens (San Antonio, Texas); Irvine Meadows Amphitheatre (Irvine, California)
- Genre: Hard rock; glam metal
- Length: 18:23
- Label: Polydor
- Producer: Michael James Jackson (track 1); Biff Dawes (tracks 2–4)

L.A. Guns chronology
Hollywood Vampires (1991)	Holiday Foreplay (1991)	Live! Vampires (1992)

Holiday Foreplay is an extended play (EP) by American hard rock band L.A. Guns. Released in November 1991 by Polydor Records, it features one track from the band's third album Hollywood Vampires, three previously unreleased live recordings from shows on the album's promotional tour, and a short holiday message from the band's frontman Phil Lewis. The album was a promotional release, and was not made available for widespread retail purchase.

== Background ==
Released in November 1991, Holiday Foreplay includes one track from the studio album Hollywood Vampires ("Dirty Luv"), three live recordings from the album's promotional tour ("Some Lie 4 Love", "Rip and Tear" and "Sex Action"), and a 12-second holiday message from L.A. Guns lead vocalist Phil Lewis. The previously unreleased tracks, produced and mixed by Biff Dawes, were recorded at two shows during the summer: "Some Lie 4 Love" on August 31, 1991 at Sunken Gardens in San Antonio, Texas, and "Rip and Tear" and "Sex Action" on September 14, 1991 at Irvine Meadows Amphitheatre in Irvine, California.

== Reception ==
Reviewing the Holiday Foreplay EP, The Hard Report claimed that "The live tracks are cool, but it's still hard to capture the energy and excitement of their live set", adding that "these live tracks give you a little insight into the rawness of it" due to the lack of "studio gloss" added in their production. Tracks from the EP reportedly received a lot of radio play, making it onto the publication's "Most Added Metal" list and later its "Hard Hitters" chart.

== Track listing ==
No.	Title	Writer(s)	Length
1.	"Dirty Luv"	Tracii Guns; Phil Lewis; Mick Cripps; Kelly Nickels; Steve Riley	4:29
2.	"Some Lie 4 Love" (live)	Guns; Lewis; Cripps; Nickels; Riley	4:03
3.	"Rip and Tear" (live)	Guns; Lewis; Cripps; Nickels; Riley	5:10
4.	"Sex Action" (live)	Guns; Lewis; Paul Black	4:20
5.	"Holiday Greetings"	Lewis	0:12
Total length:			18:23

== Personnel ==
L.A. Guns

- Phil Lewis – lead vocals
- Tracii Guns – lead guitar, backing vocals
- Mick Cripps – rhythm guitar, backing vocals
- Kelly Nickels – bass, backing vocals
- Steve Riley – drums, percussion, backing vocals

Additional personnel

- Michael James Jackson – production and recording (track 1)
- Biff Dawes – recording, engineering and mixing (tracks 2–4)
- Maxine Miller – illustration
