= Live... in the Raw =

Live album by W.A.S.P.
- Released: September 29th 1987
- Recorded: California Theatre, San Diego, California, March 8, 1987; Long Beach Arena, Long Beach, California, March 10, 1987
- Genre: Heavy metal; glam metal
- Length: 57:05
- Label: Capitol
- Producer: Blackie Lawless

W.A.S.P. chronology
Inside the Electric Circus (1986)	Live... in the Raw (1987)	The Headless Children (1989)

Singles from Live... in the Raw
- 1. "Scream Until You Like It" Released: August 1987; 2. "I Don't Need No Doctor" Released: October 1987

Professional ratings
Review scores
Source	Rating
AllMusic	2/5 stars
Collector's Guide to Heavy Metal	5/10

Live... in the Raw is the first live album by American heavy metal band W.A.S.P. (fourth album overall), released in 1987. This album can be seen as something of a breakwater between the 'old' W.A.S.P. of the first three albums and the more mature sound of the releases that would follow. It is also the album to feature "Harder Faster", which is about the PMRC declaring them "sexual perverts".

"The Manimal" and "Harder Faster" were written specifically for this album and the studio song "Scream Until You Like It" was recorded for the movie Ghoulies II. The acoustic version of "Sleeping (In the Fire)" is also a studio recording.

This would be the final release to feature drummer Steve Riley, who would leave the band shortly after the conclusion of the tour to join L.A. Guns.

== Track listing ==
All songs written by Blackie Lawless unless otherwise noted.

Side one

1. "Inside the Electric Circus" – 4:32
2. "I Don't Need No Doctor" (Jo Armstead, Nick Ashford, Valerie Simpson) – 3:35
3. "L.O.V.E. Machine" – 4:31
4. "Wild Child" (Lawless, Chris Holmes) – 6:02
5. "9.5.-N.A.S.T.Y." (Lawless, Holmes) – 5:11
6. "Sleeping (In the Fire)" – 5:23

Side two

1. "The Manimal" (Lawless, Holmes) – 4:43
2. "I Wanna Be Somebody" – 6:43
3. "Harder Faster" – 7:19
4. "Blind in Texas" – 5:40
5. "Scream Until You Like It (Theme from Ghoulies II)" (Paul Sabu, Charles Esposito, Neil Citron) – 3:26 (studio recording)

=== 1998 CD reissue bonus tracks ===
12. "Shoot from the Hip" – 5:16
13. "Widowmaker" – 4:35
14. "Sex Drive" (Lawless, Holmes) – 3:41
15. "Sleeping (In the Fire)" (Acoustic) – 4:02

== Personnel ==
W.A.S.P.

- Blackie Lawless – vocals and rhythm guitar, producer
- Chris Holmes – lead and rhythm guitar
- Johnny Rod – bass, backing vocals
- Steve Riley – drums, backing vocals

Production

- Duane Baron – engineer and mixing
- Richard McKernan – additional engineering
- John Purdell – technical assistance
- George Marino – mastering at Sterling Sound, New York

== Charts ==
=== Album ===
Chart (1987)	Peak position
Australian Albums (Kent Music Report)	97
Finnish Albums (The Official Finnish Charts)	30
German Albums (Offizielle Top 100)	61
UK Albums (OCC)	23
Billboard 200 (US)	77

=== Singles ===
Year	Single	Chart	Position
1987	"Scream Until You Like It"	UK Singles Chart	32
