= The Last Command (album) =

Studio album by W.A.S.P.
- Released: October 25, 1985
- Studios: Pasha Music House, Hollywood, California
- Genre: Heavy metal
- Length: 41:19
- Label: Capitol
- Producer: Spencer Proffer

W.A.S.P. chronology
| W.A.S.P. (1984) | The Last Command (1985) | Inside the Electric Circus (1986) |

Singles from The Last Command
- 1. "Blind in Texas" Released: October 1985; 2. "Wild Child" Released: May 1986

Professional ratings
Review scores
| Source | Rating |
|---|---|
| AllMusic | 3/5 stars |
| Collector's Guide to Heavy Metal | 7/10 |
| Kerrang! | 1.5/5 stars |
| The Metal Crypt | 4/5 stars |
| Rock Hard | 6.5/10 |

The Last Command is the second studio album by the American heavy metal band W.A.S.P., released on October 25, 1985. The album was produced by Spencer Proffer, who was perhaps best known for producing the six-time Platinum selling album Metal Health by Quiet Riot in 1983.

The song "Running Wild in the Streets" was originally written by Proffer and demoed by Spectre General a.k.a. Kick Axe and Black Sabbath with Ron Keel before release on this album. "Sex Drive" was originally written by Blackie Lawless and Randy Piper's previous band Sister. "Cries in the Night" is based on a song called "Mr. Cool", released on a 1976 single by the Killer Kane Band which Blackie fronted at the time.

The Last Command is the first W.A.S.P. album to feature the work of drummer Steve Riley and the last album to feature founding member Randy Piper on guitar. The album reached No. 49 on the Billboard 200 album chart in early 1986. It was certified gold by the RIAA on June 4, 1998.

== Background ==
Following the departure of Tony Richards, Steve Riley joined the band beginning with this album. The band also brought in Spencer Proffer—known for his work with Quiet Riot—as the producer. In addition, Carlos Cavazo and Chuck Wright, who were members of Quiet Riot at the time, contributed backing vocals to the track "Running Wild in the Streets."

In Japan, Toshiba EMI released not only the standard edition but also a limited edition (S33-1001) that included a poster, booklet, stickers, and a decorative band logo.

After the tour supporting this album, Randy Piper left the band, and Blackie Lawless subsequently switched his role from bassist to guitarist.

== Track listing ==
All tracks are written by Blackie Lawless, except where indicated.

Side one
| No. | Title | Writer(s) | Length |
|---|---|---|---|
| 1. | "Wild Child" | Lawless, Chris Holmes | 5:12 |
| 2. | "Ballcrusher" | Lawless, Holmes | 3:27 |
| 3. | "Fistful of Diamonds" | | 4:13 |
| 4. | "Jack Action" | Steve Riley, Lawless | 4:16 |
| 5. | "Widowmaker" | | 5:17 |

Side two
| No. | Title | Writer(s) | Length |
|---|---|---|---|
| 6. | "Blind in Texas" | | 4:21 |
| 7. | "Cries in the Night" | | 3:41 |
| 8. | "The Last Command" | | 4:10 |
| 9. | "Running Wild in the Streets" | Lawless, Spencer Proffer | 3:30 |
| 10. | "Sex Drive" | Lawless, Holmes | 3:12 |
| Total length: | | | 41:19 |

1997 Digital Re-master bonus tracks
| No. | Title | Writer(s) | Length |
|---|---|---|---|
| 11. | "Mississippi Queen" (Mountain cover) | Leslie West, Corky Laing, Felix Pappalardi, David Rea | 3:21 |
| 12. | "Savage" | Lawless, Holmes, Randy Piper | 3:32 |
| 13. | "On Your Knees" (Live at the Lyceum Ballroom, October 1984) | | 4:38 |
| 14. | "Hellion" (Live at the Lyceum Ballroom, October 1984) | | 4:45 |
| 15. | "Sleeping (In the Fire)" (Live at the Lyceum Ballroom, October 1984) | | 5:44 |
| 16. | "Animal (Fuck Like a Beast)" (Live at the Lyceum Ballroom, October 1984) | | 4:37 |
| 17. | "I Wanna Be Somebody" (Live at the Lyceum Ballroom, October 1984) | | 5:54 |

== Personnel ==
W.A.S.P.

- Blackie Lawless – lead vocals, bass guitar
- Chris Holmes – lead & rhythm guitars
- Randy Piper – lead & rhythm guitars, backing vocals
- Steve Riley – drums, backing vocals

Additional musicians

- Carlos Cavazo, Chuck Wright – Backing vocals on "Running Wild in the Streets"

Production

- Spencer Proffer – producer, engineer
- Suzanna DuBarry – producer assistant
- Hanspeter Huber – engineer
- Alex Woltman, Kevin Arnst – assistant engineers
- Steve Hall – mastering at Future Disc, Hollywood
- Mark Weiss – photography

== Charts ==
=== Album ===
| Chart (1985–1986) | Peak position |
|---|---|
| Australian Albums (Kent Music Report) | 51 |
| Canada Top Albums/CDs (RPM) | 86 |
| Finnish Albums (The Official Finnish Charts) | 4 |
| German Albums (Offizielle Top 100) | 63 |
| Norwegian Albums (VG-lista) | 14 |
| Swedish Albums (Sverigetopplistan) | 15 |
| UK Albums (Official Charts) | 48 |
| US Billboard 200 | 49 |

=== Singles ===
| Year | Single | Chart | Position |
|---|---|---|---|
| 1985 | "Blind in Texas" | Finnish Singles Chart | 6 |
| 1985 | "Blind in Texas" | UK Singles Chart | 77 |
| 1986 | "Wild Child" | UK Singles Chart | 71 |

== Certifications ==
| Region | Certification | Certified units/sales |
|---|---|---|
| Canada (Music Canada) | Gold | 50,000^{^} |
| Finland (Musiikkituottajat) | Gold | 20,000 |
| United States (RIAA) | Gold | 500,000^{^} |
^{^} Shipments figures based on certification alone.
