= Hollywood Rehearsal =

Compilation album by L.A. Guns
- Released: 1997
- Genre: Glam metal

L.A. Guns chronology
American Hardcore (1996)	Hollywood Rehearsal (1997)	Wasted (1998)

Professional ratings
Review scores
Source	Rating
AllMusic	4/5 stars

Hollywood Rehearsal is a collection of demos by L.A. Guns that was released in Japan. None of the demos had already been released.

== Track listing ==
1. "I Feel Nice" (The Psyclone Rangers Cover)
2. "High on You" (Iggy Pop Cover)
3. "Strange Boat" (The Waterboys Cover)
4. "Gunslinger" (Bogey Boys Cover)
5. "Rip Off" (T. Rex (band) Cover)
6. "Should I Stay or Should I Go" (The Clash cover)
7. "Custard Pie" (Led Zeppelin cover)
8. "Rock Candy" (Montrose cover)
9. "All the Way"
10. "Guilty"
11. "Long Time Dead" (remix)
12. "Dangerous Games"

== Personnel ==
- Phil Lewis: vocals
- Tracii Guns: guitar
- Mick Cripps: guitar and keyboards
- Kelly Nickels: bass
- Steve Riley: drums
