= Inside the Electric Circus =

Studio album by W.A.S.P.
- Released: October 22, 1986
- Recorded: August 1986
- Studios: Pasha Music House, North Hollywood, Los Angeles
- Genres: Hard rock, heavy metal
- Length: 47:57
- Label: Capitol
- Producer: Blackie Lawless

W.A.S.P. chronology
The Last Command (1985)	Inside the Electric Circus (1986)	Live... in the Raw (1987)

Singles from Inside the Electric Circus
- 1. "9.5.-N.A.S.T.Y." / "Easy Living" Released: September 1986

Inside the Electric Circus is the third album by the American heavy metal band W.A.S.P., released on October 22, 1986, through Capitol Records.

A remastered edition featuring two bonus tracks was reissued in 1997 through Snapper Music. The album is the band's first to feature singer and bandleader Blackie Lawless playing guitar, having switched from bass to rhythm guitar. It reached No. 60 on the US Billboard 200 chart, where it remained for 19 weeks.

== Critical reception ==
Professional ratings
Review scores
Source	Rating
AllMusic	3/5 stars
Collector's Guide to Heavy Metal	5/10

Greg Prato at AllMusic gave Inside The Electric Circus three stars out of five, calling it "[an attempt] to grow musically with each successive release". Canadian journalist Martin Popoff considered the album "slightly more simplified and hard rock-based" than previous works and reminded in his review how Lawless "in retrospect considered this record a failure."

Lawless himself has been critical of Inside The Electric Circus, going as far as to name it his least favorite W.A.S.P. album, calling it a "tired record done by a tired band".

Metal Hammer included the album cover on their list of "50 most hilariously ugly rock and metal album covers ever".

== Track listing ==
Side one
No.	Title	Writer(s)	Length
1.	"The Big Welcome"	Blackie Lawless	0:51
2.	"Inside the Electric Circus"	Lawless	4:06
3.	"I Don't Need No Doctor" (Ray Charles, Humble Pie cover)	Jo Armstead, Nick Ashford, Valerie Simpson	3:28
4.	"9.5.-N.A.S.T.Y."	Lawless, Chris Holmes	4:50
5.	"Restless Gypsy"	Lawless	5:02
6.	"Shoot from the Hip"	Lawless	4:44

Side two
No.	Title	Writer(s)	Length
7.	"I'm Alive"	Lawless	4:24
8.	"Easy Living" (Uriah Heep cover)	Ken Hensley	3:13
9.	"Sweet Cheetah"	Lawless, Holmes	5:18
10.	"Mantronic"	Lawless, Holmes	4:12
11.	"King of Sodom and Gomorrah"	Lawless, Holmes	3:52
12.	"The Rock Rolls On"	Lawless	3:57
Total length:			47:57

1997 remastered edition bonus tracks
No.	Title	Writer(s)	Length
13.	"Flesh and Fire"	Lawless	4:37
14.	"D.B. Blues"	Lawless	3:24

== Personnel ==
W.A.S.P.

- Blackie Lawless – lead vocals, rhythm guitar, producer
- Chris Holmes – lead guitar
- Johnny Rod – bass, background vocals
- Steve Riley – drums, background vocals

Production

- Duane Baron, Alex Woltman – engineers
- Hans Peter Huber, Kevin Lehue – additional engineering
- Michael Wagener, Garth Richardson – mixing
- George Marino – mastering at Sterling Sound, New York

== Charts ==
=== Album ===
Chart (1986)	Peak position
Australian Albums (Kent Music Report)	94
Canada Top Albums/CDs (RPM)	84
Finnish Albums (The Official Finnish Charts)	16
Norwegian Albums (VG-lista)	17
Swedish Albums (Sverigetopplistan)	35
UK Albums (Official Charts)	53
US Billboard 200	60

=== Singles ===
Year	Single	Chart	Position
1986	"9.5.-N.A.S.T.Y."	Finnish Singles Chart	18
1986	"9.5.-N.A.S.T.Y."	UK Singles Chart	70
1987	"I Don't Need No Doctor"	UK Singles Chart	31
