= Black List (L.A. Guns album) =

Paul Black's L.A. Guns Black List

Compilation album by L.A. Guns
- Released: November 8, 2005
- Recorded: 1985–1986
- Genre: Hard rock, glam metal
- Label: Black City

L.A. Guns chronology
Tales from the Strip (2005)	Paul Black's L.A. Guns Black List (2005)	Loud & Dangerous: Live from Hollywood (2006)

Black List is the second of two L.A. Guns compilation albums featuring their third singer Paul Black. The album, released in November 2005, features material that were recorded by the band as demos, which were then provided to various record labels and venues. The recordings were made between 1985 and 1986, when Black was fronting the band. In the early 2000s Black was granted the rights to the recordings, following a court ruling, which lead to the release of the eighteen demo recordings not by L.A. Guns but as Paul Black's L.A. Guns. A number of the tracks, such as "Show No Mercy" and "One More Reason to Die" were re-written, re-recorded and included on the band's 1988 debut self-titled album.

AllMusic's Greg Prato states: "Black's vocals were reminiscent at times to those of W.A.S.P.'s Blackie Lawless, while the album-opening "Stranded in L.A." shows that the group was harder edged than the local competition at the time (Poison, Warrant, etc.)."

== Track listing ==
No.	Title	Writer(s)	Length
1.	"Stranded in L.A."	Paul Black; Tracii Guns; Mick Cripps; Robert Stoddard; Nickey Alexander	3:06
2.	"L.A.P.D."	Black; Guns; Stoddard; Alexander	3:56
3.	"Show No Mercy"	Alexander	3:05
4.	"One More Reason to Die"	Black; Guns; Stoddard; Alexander	3:03
5.	"Looking Over My Shoulder"	Black; Guns; Stoddard; Alexander	3:28
6.	"Love & Hate"	Black; Guns; Stoddard; Alexander	3:44
7.	"On and On"	Black; Guns; Stoddard; Alexander	3:36
8.	"Wired and Wide Awake"	Black; Guns; Stoddard; Alexander	2:52
9.	"One Way Ticket to Love"	Black; Guns; Stoddard; Alexander	3:44
10.	"Name Your Poison"	Black; Guns; Stoddard; Alexander	3:52
11.	"Liquid Diamonds"	Black; Guns; Stoddard; Alexander	4:26
12.	"Love is a Crime"	Alexander	4:05
13.	"Winters Fool"	Black; Guns; Stoddard; Alexander	3:35
14.	"Everything I Do"	Black; Guns; Stoddard; Alexander	3:58
15.	"A Word to the Wise Guy"	Black; Guns; Stoddard; Alexander	3:25
16.	"Roll the Dice"	Black; Guns; Stoddard; Alexander	3:50
17.	"Black City Breakdown"	Black; Guns; Stoddard; Alexander	4:02
18.	"The Devil in You" (performed by Black Cherry)	Black	3:25
Total length:			65:28

== Personnel ==
- Paul Black - lead vocals
- Tracii Guns - guitar
- Robert Stoddard - guitar
- Mick Cripps - bass guitar
- Nickey Alexander - drums
