= I Don't Want to Live Without You (Gregg Tripp song) =

"I Don't Want To Live Without You"

Single by Gregg Tripp

from the album Tempus Edax Rerum
- Genre: Soft rock, adult contemporary
- Songwriters: Gregg Tripp, Elliot Wolff

"I Don't Want To Live Without You" is a rock song performed by American singer Gregg Tripp. It was written by Tripp and Elliot Wolff.

The song is featured prominently in the Christian Slater feature film Kuffs (1992) and is designated as its love theme.

It appears on Tripp's album Tempus Edax Rerum, yet does not appear on the album soundtrack for Kuffs.
