= American Hardcore =

American Hardcore refers to:

- American Hardcore (album), by L.A. Guns
- American Hardcore (film), 2006 film
