= Cuts (EP) =

EP by L.A. Guns
- Released: December 2, 1992
- Recorded: 1991–1992
- Studio: Red Zone (Burbank, California)
- Genre: Hard rock; glam metal
- Length: 19:50
- Label: Polydor
- Producer: L.A. Guns

L.A. Guns chronology
Live! Vampires (1992)	Cuts (1992)	Best Of: Hollywood a Go-Go (1994)

Professional ratings
Review scores
Source	Rating
AllMusic	2/5 stars
Collector's Guide to Heavy Metal	3/10

Cuts is an extended play (EP) by American hard rock band L.A. Guns. Recorded at Red Zone Studios in Burbank, California, it was self-produced by the band and released on December 2, 1992, by Polydor Records. The standard edition of the EP features five tracks, including three cover versions, one re-recording and one new song. The Japanese edition includes two additional cover versions. Cuts is the first L.A. Guns release to feature drummer Michael "Bones" Gershima.

== Background ==
Released in December 1992, Cuts was issued in response to rumors that L.A. Guns were due to split up, with the news that the band would be recording a new studio album the following year. The EP includes three cover versions – of Generation X's "Night of the Cadillacs", David Bowie's "Suffragette City" and James Brown's "Papa's Got a Brand New Bag" – as well as a re-recording of Hollywood Vampires Japanese bonus track "Ain't the Same" and new song "Killer Mahari". The Japanese edition also includes covers of "Love Song", originally by The Damned, and "Rock & Roll High School", originally by the Ramones. Cuts is the first L.A. Guns release to feature drummer Michael "Bones" Gershima, who replaced Steve Riley in January 1992. Riley performed on three tracks before his departure.

== Track listing ==
Japanese edition
No.	Title	Writer(s)	Length
1.	"Love Song" (The Damned cover)	David Vanian; Raymond Burns; Algy Ward; Christopher Millar	2:05
2.	"Rock & Roll High School" (Ramones cover)	Joey Ramone; Johnny Ramone; Dee Dee Ramone	1:43
3.	"Night of the Cadillacs" (Generation X cover)	Idol; James	3:19
4.	"Suffragette City" (David Bowie cover)	Bowie	3:22
5.	"Ain't the Same '92"	Guns; Lewis; Cripps; Nickels; Riley	4:16
6.	"Papa's Got a Brand New Bag" (James Brown cover)	Brown	3:29
7.	"Killer Mahari"	Guns; Lewis; Cripps; Nickels; Riley	5:24
Total length:			23:38

International edition
No.	Title	Writer(s)	Length
1.	"Night of the Cadillacs" (Generation X cover)	Idol; James	3:19
2.	"Suffragette City" (David Bowie cover)	Bowie	3:22
3.	"Ain't the Same '92"	Guns; Lewis; Cripps; Nickels; Riley	4:16
4.	"Papa's Got a Brand New Bag" (James Brown cover)	Brown	3:29
5.	"Killer Mahari"	Guns; Lewis; Cripps; Nickels; Riley	5:24

== Personnel ==
L.A. Guns
- Phil Lewis – vocals, production
- Tracii Guns – lead guitar, production
- Mick Cripps – rhythm guitar, production
- Kelly Nickels – bass, production
- Michael "Bones" Gershima – drums (tracks 1–4), production
- Steve Riley – drums (tracks 5–7)

Additional musicians

- Spike Gray – backing vocals (track 3)
- Kellie Rucker – harmonica and backing vocals (track 6)
- James Outlaw III – backing vocals (track 7)
- Shandra Lockett – backing vocals (track 7)
- Jennifer Perkins – backing vocals (track 7)
- J. K. Scott – backing vocals (track 7)

Additional personnel

- Dennis Degher – engineering
- Trent Slatton – engineering
- Micajah Ryan – additional engineering
- Steve Hall – mastering
- Duke Design Co. – art direction, design
- William Hames – photography
