= Cocked & Loaded =

Studio album by L.A. Guns
- Released: August 22, 1989
- Recorded: April – June 1989
- Studio: One on One, North Hollywood, California; Music Grinder, Hollywood, California; Conway, Hollywood, California
- Genre: Glam metal
- Length: 54:24
- Label: Vertigo
- Producer: Duane Baron; John Purdell; Tom Werman

L.A. Guns chronology
L.A. Guns (1988)	Cocked & Loaded (1989)	Hollywood Vampires (1991)

Singles from Cocked & Loaded
- 1. "Rip and Tear" Released: 1989; 2. "Never Enough" Released: 1989; 3. "The Ballad of Jayne" Released: 1989

Cocked & Loaded is the second studio album by American glam metal band L.A. Guns. Recorded at Hollywood studios One on One, Music Grinder and Conway Recording, it was produced by Duane Baron, John Purdell and Tom Werman, and released on August 22, 1989, by Vertigo Records. The album is the first to feature drummer Steve Riley. "Rip and Tear", "Never Enough", "The Ballad of Jayne", "I Wanna Be Your Man" and "Malaria" were released as the album's singles.

Following the success of their self-titled debut album the previous year, L.A. Guns quickly set about recording the follow-up in 1989. Writing for all tracks were credited to all five members of the band, while "Never Enough" was co-written by Gregg Tripp and Phil Roy. Four tracks were re-recorded by the reunited classic lineup of the band in 1999 for the compilation Greatest Hits and Black Beauties, and the whole album was re-recorded for the release Cocked & Re-Loaded.

Upon its release, Cocked & Loaded peaked at number 38 on the Billboard 200 and was certified gold by the Recording Industry Association of America in 1990. Both "Rip and Tear" and "The Ballad of Jayne" reached the top 50 of the Billboard Mainstream Rock chart, while the latter registered at number 33 on the Billboard Hot 100. Media response to the album was positive, with critics praising the band's development of their sound from their debut album the previous year.

In 2018, Collin Brennan of Consequence included the album in his list of "10 Hair Metal Albums That Don’t Suck".

== Background ==
L.A. Guns recorded the follow-up to their 1988 self-titled debut album early the following year, working with producers Duane Baron, John Purdell and Tom Werman. Sessions took place at three Hollywood studios, One on One Studios, Music Grinder and Conway Recording. The album was the band's first to feature drummer Steve Riley, who took over from his predecessor Nickey "Beat" Alexander after the recording for L.A. Guns was completed. Five singles were released in promotion of the album, two of which charted in the US – "The Ballad of Jayne" reached number 33 on the Billboard Hot 100 and number 25 on the Mainstream Rock chart, while "Rip and Tear" reached number 47 on the latter chart. Music videos for all five tracks were featured on the 1990 video Love, Peace & Geese.

== Reception ==
Professional ratings
Review scores
Source	Rating
AllMusic	4.5/5 stars
The Collector's Guide to Heavy Metal	8/10
Los Angeles Times	3/5 stars

Upon its release, Cocked & Loaded debuted at number 89 on the US Billboard 200. It spent a total of 56 weeks on the chart, peaking at number 38 in July 1990. In the same month, the album was certified gold by the Recording Industry Association of America, for domestic sales in excess of 500,000 certified units. Outside of the US, the album reached number 23 on the Japanese Albums Chart, and number 38 on the UK Albums Chart.

Media response to Cocked & Loaded was generally positive. Cash Box magazine claimed that the band had "grown by leaps and bounds" since the release of their self-titled debut the previous year, praising the performance of lead guitarist Tracii Guns in particular. Billboard magazine's review was more mixed, as they described the album as "a spotty affair" and added that the band "has a sound that verges on the metal generic at times, but when the members click ... they can run with the best of the pack". The opinion of Los Angeles Times writer Janiss Garza was similar, who claimed that "The L.A.-based quintet's blatant disregard for subtlety works, as long as you don't think too deeply" and praised "Magdalaine" and "Give a Little" in particular as "a few interesting turns".

Retrospectively, the album has received widespread critical acclaim. Steve Huey of music website AllMusic dubbed it "L.A. Guns' most consistent and effective album", claiming that it "manages to balance the underlying darkness of Guns N' Roses' urban outlook with Mötley Crüe's party-anthem glam metal". In particular, Huey praised the songwriting as "among [the band's] best", highlighting the tracks "Never Enough" and "The Ballad of Jayne". Rolling Stone magazine named Cocked & Loaded the 27th best "hair metal" album of all time, praising the variety of material on the release including "bullet-belt bravado" on "Rip and Tear", "17 Crash" and "Give a Little", the "hard-living knowledge" on display on "Sleazy Come Easy Go", and the "proggier side" shown on "Magdalaine" and "Malaria". In his review for The Collector's Guide to Heavy Metal, Martin Popoff described the music of the album as rock "with a Crüe-style inebriation here, yet with a strange, almost indiscernible cloak of mystery" and remarked the "intensity applied to the basic party metal format".

== Track listing ==
All tracks are written by Tracii Guns, Phil Lewis, Mick Cripps, Kelly Nickels and Steve Riley, except where noted.

No.	Title	Writer(s)	Length
1.	"Letting Go"		1:22
2.	"Slap in the Face"		3:54
3.	"Rip and Tear"		4:11
4.	"Sleazy Come Easy Go"		4:01
5.	"Never Enough"	Guns; Lewis; Cripps; Nickels; Riley; Gregg Tripp; Phil Roy	4:10
6.	"Malaria"		5:22
7.	"The Ballad of Jayne"		4:30
8.	"Magdalaine"		6:05
9.	"Give a Little"		3:29
10.	"I'm Addicted" (guitar solo)	Willie Dixon	1:51
11.	"17 Crash"		3:39
12.	"Showdown (Riot on Sunset)"		3:18
13.	"Wheels of Fire"		4:56
14.	"I Wanna Be Your Man"		3:36
Total length:			54:24

Japanese edition bonus tracks
No.	Title	Writer(s)	Length
15.	"Rock Candy" (Montrose cover)	Sammy Hagar; Ronnie Montrose	4:27
16.	"No Mercy" (live)	Guns; Cripps; Lewis; Nickey Alexander	3:52
Total length:			62:43

== Personnel ==
L.A. Guns
- Phil Lewis – lead vocals
- Tracii Guns – electric, acoustic and 12-string guitars, electric Coral sitar, theremin, backing vocals
- Mick Cripps – electric and acoustic guitars, piano, backing vocals
- Kelly Nickels – bass, harmonica, backing vocals
- Steve Riley – drums, percussion

Additional musicians

- Ted Nugent – guitar
- Robin Zander – backing vocals
- Rick Nielsen – backing vocals
- Derek St. Holmes – backing vocals

Production personnel

- Duane Baron – production, engineering
- John Purdell – production, engineering
- Tom Werman – production
- Mike Tacci – additional engineering
- Lawrence Ethan – additional engineering
- Marnie Riley – additional engineering
- Gary Wagner – additional engineering
- Robert Hart – additional engineering
- Howie Weinberg – mastering

Packaging personnel

- Michael Bays – art direction
- Michael Klotz – design
- Nausica Loukakos – design
- Maxine Miller – front cover artwork
- Jeff Katz – photography

== Charts ==
Chart (1989)	Peak position
Japanese Albums (Oricon)	23
UK Albums (OCC)	45
US Billboard 200	38

== Certifications ==
Region	Certification	Certified units/sales
United States (RIAA)	Gold	500,000^{^}
^{^} Shipments figures based on certification alone.
