= The Mau Maus =

American punk rock band

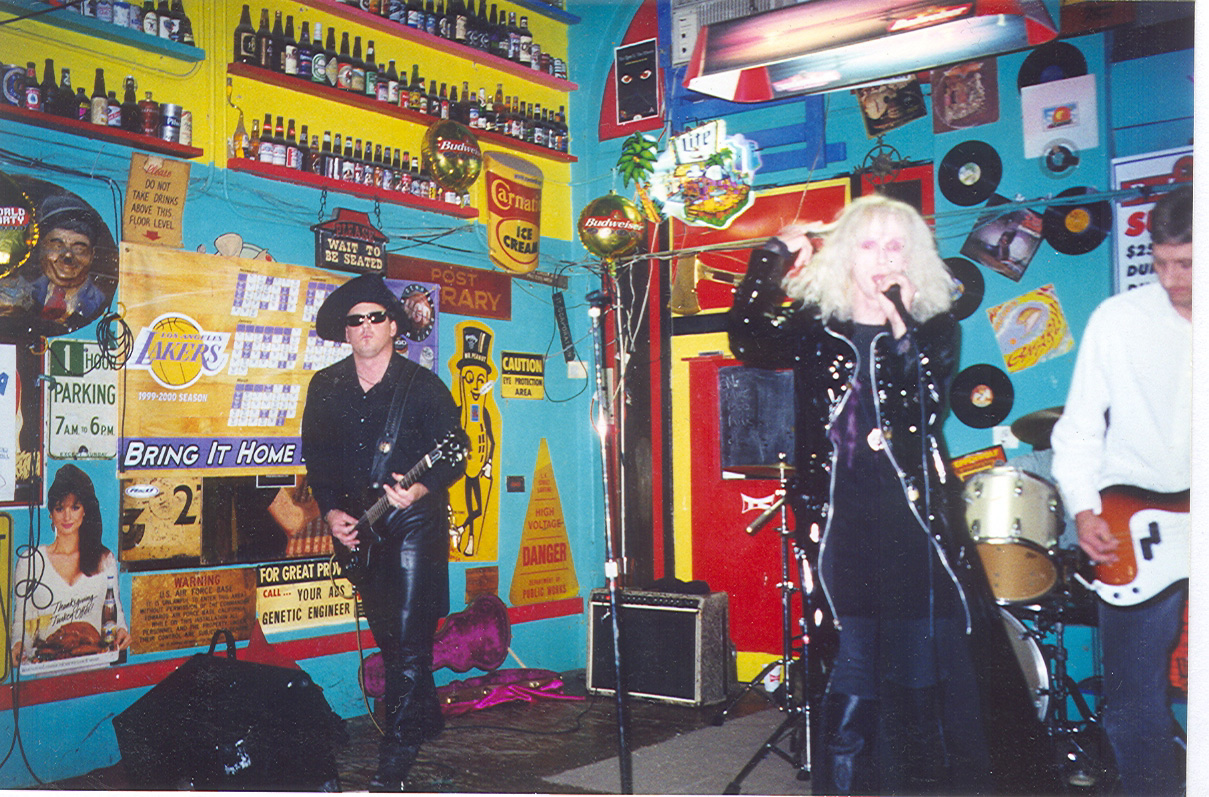
- Left to right: Michael Livingston, Rick Wilder, and Danny Kupresan in 2000 at The Pitcher House in Redondo Beach

Background information
- Origin: Hollywood, California
- Genres: Punk rock
- Years active: 1978–present
- Label: Rachet Blade Records
- Members: Rick Wilder; Michael Livingston; Scott 'Chopper' Franklin; Paul Mars
- Past members: Rick Sherman; Earl Washington; Greg Salva; Roderick Donahue; Rick Torres; Oscar Harvey; David Daniel; Johnnie Sage; Bobby Bones; Nickey "Beat" Alexander

The Mau Maus, also known as The Mau-Maus, are an American punk rock band from Hollywood, California. They were formed by lead singer and sole constant member Rick Wilder in 1978 following the breakup of the glam rock and proto-punk band, The Berlin Brats, in 1976. The band is closely tied to the late first-wave punk scene in California. Their signature song, “(I’m) Psychotic,” was first performed by the Berlin Brats and appeared in a scene in the classic stoner film, Cheech and Chong’s Up in Smoke (1978).

== Background ==
The original line-up was from Hollywood, California was Greg Salva on guitar, Roderick Donahue on bass, and Rick Torres on drums. They started out playing at The Masque in Hollywood. Salva was replaced by Michael Livingston in 1979 after Salva moved to New York City and Donahue was replaced first by Oscar Harvey and then by Scott Franklin (bassist in The Cramps, 2002-2006). Wilder had been chosen to be the MC of the Penelope Spheeris movie The Decline of Western Civilization but was dumped after he insisted he be able to say what he really thought of every act before their clip, hinting that it was probably not going to be complimentary.

One of the original bands from The Masque era, the Mau Maus are conspicuous by their absence from Decline. Wilder's eccentric attitude toward the record industry and the legendarily self-destructive lifestyles of himself and his band members guaranteed that no record company would risk finances on the Mau Maus. This lack of recorded music contributed towards a long period of obscurity despite being well known by most in the early Los Angeles punk rock scene. The Mau Maus can be seen in the classic stoner film, Cheech & Chong’s Up in Smoke, the classic punk rock film, Rock 'n' Roll High School (starring the Ramones), appeared in the movie Cocaine and Blue Eyes (starring O. J. Simpson), and were included in the compilation album Hell Comes to Your House II.

Rick Wilder also showed up in The Weeknd's music videos for the songs "Tell Your Friends", "The Hills", and "Can't Feel My Face". He is also the main character in Ariel Pink's music videos for the song "Dayzed Inn Daydreams".

The Mau Maus’ long delayed album Scorched Earth Policies: Then and Now was released by Ratchet Blade Records in 2012. The first half of the album was originally produced by The Doors' Robbie Krieger (who also played guitar on the first track) in 1983 before being abandoned; the latter half of the album was produced by L.A. punk producer Geza X, who also remixed the 1983 Krieger sessions.

== Members ==
Current members

- Rick Wilder - lead vocals
- Michael Livingston - guitar
- Scott 'Chopper' Franklin - bass
- Paul Mars - drums

Former Members

- Rick Sherman - guitar
- Earl Washington - drums
- Greg Salva - guitar
- Roderick Donahue - bass
- Rick Torres - drums
- Oscar Harvey - bass
- David Daniel - guitar
- Johnnie Sage - guitar
- Bobby Bones - guitar
- Nickey "Beat" Alexander - drums

== Discography ==
=== Studio albums ===
- Scorched Earth Policies: Then and Now (2012, Ratchet Blade Records)

=== Compilation albums ===
- "Sex Girls In Uniform" and "We All Fall Down" on Hell Comes To Your House Part II (1983, Bemisbrain)
- "Facts of War" on Burning Britain: A Story of Independent U.K. Punk 1980-1983 (2016, Cherry Red Records)
