= Tony Richards (musician) =

American drummer (1956/1957–2026)

Background information
- Born: Anthony Richard Orlando; June 19, 1957
- Died: November 11, 2026 (aged 69)
- Genres: Heavy metal, hard rock
- Occupation: Musician
- Instrument: Drums
- Years active: 1978–2026

Anthony Richard Orlando (June 19, 1957 – November 11, 2026), better known as Tony Richards, was an American musician who was the original drummer of the heavy metal band W.A.S.P. from 1982 until 1984.

== Musical career ==
Richards played for various bands in his early career before relocating to the Los Angeles area from Phoenix, Arizona in 1980. He began his professional career in the Los Angeles heavy metal scene with a band called Dante Fox, later to become known as Great White. With bandmates including Don Costa, Richards regularly played clubs in Hollywood and Los Angeles such as the Troubador, Roxy Theatre, Whisky a Go Go, and Starwood.

In late 1982, Richards, soon followed by Costa, left Dante Fox after being asked by Blackie Lawless to join his new band, W.A.S.P. Richards left the band for unspecified reasons following the release of their debut album W.A.S.P. in 1984, being replaced by Steve Riley, who would later leave to join L.A. Guns.

He had been playing in a band called DellaVella along with Carl Della Vella on bass guitar and Lee Oliver on lead guitar.

== Death ==
On November 11, 2026, Richards' former bandmates in W.A.S.P. (including Blackie Lawless and Chris Holmes) announced on social media that he had died. He was 69. Richards is the third former drummer of W.A.S.P. to have died, after Frankie Banali and Steve Riley in 2020 and 2023, respectively.
