= Blackstock Boneyard =

Horror film by Andre Alfa

- Directed by: Andre Alfa
- Screenplay by: Stephen George
- Story by: Andre Alfa; Stephen George
- Produced by: Andre Alfa; Stephen George; Cameron Wade Mason; Keithian D. Sammons
- Starring: Ashley Whelan; Laura Flannery; Dean Wilson; Aubree Storm; Aspen Kennedy Wilson; Richie Stephens
- Cinematography: Amza Moglan
- Edited by: Hernan Menendez
- Music by: David Thomas
- Production companies: Monalena Pictures; WorKs Entertainment Group
- Distributed by: Uncork'd Entertainment
- Release date: June 8, 2021 (United States)
- Running time: 80 minutes
- Country: United States
- Language: English

Blackstock Boneyard is a 2021 American horror slasher film and the directorial debut of Andre Alfa. Loosely based on the story of Thomas and Meeks Griffin, the film focuses on a young woman who is the target of undead vengeance after she inherits their stolen land.

Filming for the movie took place in Louisiana and the movie was released on June 8, 2021.

== Plot ==
In 1913 two wealthy black farmers, Thomas and Meeks Griffin, are framed for a murder they did not commit, so that the true killers can obtain their land. Their plan is successful and they divvy up the property between them. Approximately 100 years later two of the murderers' descendants, CJ Ramage and Roger Nebold, wish to sell the property for a massive amount of money but find that they must obtain the permission of a third, previously unknown heir named Lyndsay. Lured by the promise of easy money, Lyndsay travels to Blackstock, South Carolina with her friends to sign the business deal. Once there, Lyndsay finds herself drawn to Jesse, a descendant of the Griffin brothers. He warns Lyndsay that CJ and Roger are not to be trusted and is frustrated when she still chooses to sell the land.

Unbeknownst to Lyndsay and the others, the Griffin brothers have risen from the grave to seek vengeance against anyone who hopes to profit from the stolen land. They begin killing people at the business meeting one by one until only CJ and Lyndsay are left. The Griffins corner Lyndsay, however she is saved by Jesse, who tells her of her bloody heritage. The two realize that the Griffins will spare Lyndsay if she removes her name from the business plan and set out to obtain the papers. Just as she is about to remove her name, CJ arrives and wounds Jesse. Angry, Lyndsay kills CJ and destroys the papers by shooting him through the head while the Griffins watch, after which she sobs over Jesse's unconscious form.

The film ends with Lyndsay and Jesse becoming a couple and choosing to live on the property together.

== Cast ==
- Laura Flannery as Samantha Ramage
- Ashley Whelan as Lyndsy
- Aspen Kennedy Wilson as Jesse Washington
- Sara Morgan as Chloe
- Creek Wilson as Sheriff Brice
- Dean Wil as Meeks Griffin (as Dean Wilson)
- Aubree Storm as Sarah
- David Jite as Thomas Griffin
- Brittany Lucio as Anna Davis
- Terry Milam as Judge Carroll Johnson 'CJ' Ramage
- Richie Stephens as Deputy Jasper
- Jonathan Fuller as Roger Newbold
- Bryan McClure as Corey Ramage
- Steve Riley as Billy the Bartender

== Production ==
The story was inspired by the story of Thomas Griffin and Meeks Griffin, two prominent black farmers who were forced to sell their land and wrongly executed. Blackstock Boneyard was shot in Donaldsonville, Louisiana and St. Emma Plantation in Ascension Parish, Louisiana, United States. Filming took place over three weeks, and shooting consisted mostly of night shoots.

== Release ==
Blackstock Boneyard was released to home video and streaming on June 8, 2021.

== Reception ==
Upon release the film received reviews from Nerdly, Rue Morgue, and Starburst. Starburst's Martin Unsworth praised the film's atmosphere while noting that the film felt overly rushed, particularly the romance between Jesse and Lyndsy. Emilie Black of Cinema Crazed highlighted the special effects, which they stated went from "great to absolutely horrible which is a source of entertainment here." Jerry Jenae Sampson of Rue Morgue was more critical, writing that "There is an interesting concept hidden amidst the under-cooked script and cliché characters, but BLACKSTOCK BONEYARD never fully realizes the potential within the exploration of ancestral trauma and racial injustice."
