= Wild Child (W.A.S.P. song) =

1985 single by hair metal W.A.S.P band

Single by W.A.S.P.

from the album The Last Command
- B-side: "Mississippi Queen"
- Released: May 1986
- Recorded: 1985
- Genre: Glam metal
- Length: 5:12
- Label: Capitol
- Songwriters: Blackie Lawless, Chris Holmes
- Producer: Spencer Proffer

W.A.S.P. singles chronology
| "Cries in the Night" (1985) | "Wild Child" (1986) | "On Your Knees (Live)" (1986) |

"Wild Child" is a single by American heavy metal band W.A.S.P. Written by Blackie Lawless and Chris Holmes, it serves as the intro track off their second studio album The Last Command and was released as the third single. The song charted at number 71 on the UK Singles Chart.

== Critical reception ==
Reviewing the single for Sounds, Roger Holland noted a shift in the band's artistic direction following the controversy surrounding their debut single. He wrote that as the "clouds of outrage" from "Animal (F**k Like a Beast)" were dissipating, the "wildly erratic" Los Angeles group had "change[d] tack and catch[ed] a fresh, gusting wind." Holland praised the release, describing W.A.S.P. as "evolving into a genuinely hard and stunning newage rock band."

== Music video ==
The music video starts off with vocalist Blackie Lawless riding a motorcycle on a desert highway. He then spots a woman wearing a red jumpsuit standing on a cliff-edge who disappears as soon as he sees her. The video then cuts to the band performing the song on the top of a cliff and concludes with Lawless encountering the woman again at nightfall, who again fades into thin air upon being seen by him. Lawless then rides his motorcycle through the path of her disappearance, leaving a trail of flames behind him.

The music video was directed by Rick Friedberg.

== Track listing ==
7" single

Side A
| No. | Title | Writer(s) | Length |
|---|---|---|---|
| 1. | "Wild Child" | Blackie Lawless, Chris Holmes | 5:12 |

Side B
| No. | Title | Writer(s) | Length |
|---|---|---|---|
| 1. | "Mississippi Queen" | Leslie West, Corky Laing, Felix Pappalardi, David Rea | 3:21 |

12" single

Side A
| No. | Title | Writer(s) | Length |
|---|---|---|---|
| 1. | "Wild Child (The Wild Remix)" | Blackie Lawless, Chris Holmes | 6:12 |

Side B
| No. | Title | Writer(s) | Length |
|---|---|---|---|
| 1. | "Mississippi Queen" | Leslie West, Corky Laing, Felix Pappalardi, David Rea | 3:21 |
| 2. | "L.O.V.E. Machine (Live Version)" | Blackie Lawless | 3:54 |

== Legacy ==
Finnish guitarist and vocalist Alexi Laiho, a fan of the band in his formative years, took himself a nickname "Wildchild" after the song.

The song is included on the soundtrack of the 2018 film Widows.

== Charts ==
Chart performance for "Whild Child"
| Chart (1986) | Peak position |
|---|---|
| UK Singles (Official Charts) | 71 |
