= 20th Century Masters – The Millennium Collection: The Best of L.A. Guns =

20th Century Masters – The Millennium Collection: The Best Of L.A. Guns

Greatest hits album by L.A. Guns
- Released: April 12, 2005
- Genre: Hard rock, glam metal
- Length: 51:14
- Label: Polydor; A&M (US distribution)
- Producer: Duane Baron, Jim Faraci, Michael James Jackson, John Purdell, Mike Ragogna, Tom Werman, Jim Wirt

L.A. Guns chronology
Hollywood Raw: The Original Sessions (2004)	20th Century Masters – The Millennium Collection: The Best Of L.A. Guns (2005)	Tales from the Strip (2005)

Professional ratings
Review scores
Source	Rating
AllMusic	link

20th Century Masters – The Millennium Collection: The Best of L.A. Guns is an L.A. Guns compilation album. Unlike previous compilation albums by the band (with the exception of Best Of: Hollywood a Go-Go), 20th Century Masters consists of the actual original recordings, not newly recorded versions of the band's hits.

== Track listing ==
1. "Sex Action"
2. "One More Reason"
3. "Electric Gypsy"
4. "Rip & Tear"
5. "Never Enough"
6. "The Ballad of Jayne"
7. "Over the Edge"
8. "Kiss My Love Goodbye"
9. "Crystal Eyes"
10. "It's Over Now"
11. "Face Down"
12. "Long Time Dead"
