= Bruce A. Evans =

American film director, producer and screenwriter (born 1946)

- Born: Bruce Anslie Evans; September 19, 1946 (age 80); Long Beach, California, U.S.
- Occupations: Film director, producer, screenwriter
- Known for: Stand by Me, Starman, Kuffs, Mr. Brooks

Bruce Anslie Evans (born September 19, 1946) is an American film director, producer and screenwriter. He is best known for his work on Starman (1984), Stand by Me (1986), Jungle 2 Jungle (1997) and Mr. Brooks (2007).

Evans has frequently collaborated with screenwriter Raynold Gideon. The two received an Academy Award for Best Adapted Screenplay nomination for Stand by Me at the 59th Academy Awards in 1987. Evans has also directed two feature films, Kuffs (1992) and Mr. Brooks (2007).

== Background ==
Evans was born in Long Beach, California, on September 19, 1946. He attended the University of Southern California and the University of California, Los Angeles. Before establishing himself as a screenwriter, he also worked as an art auctioneer in Los Angeles.

Evans began collaborating with fellow screenwriter Raynold Gideon during the 1970s. Their partnership developed into a long-running professional relationship encompassing original screenplays, adaptations and film production.

== Career ==
=== Early screenwriting and Stand by Me ===
Evans's earliest listed feature-film writing credit was for A Man, a Woman, and a Bank (1979), a crime comedy starring Donald Sutherland, Brooke Adams and Paul Mazursky. The film marked an early collaboration between Evans and Gideon, who contributed to the screenplay alongside Stuart Margolin.

The pair subsequently wrote Starman (1984), a science fiction romance directed by John Carpenter and starring Jeff Bridges and Karen Allen. Evans also served as an associate producer on the film.

Their next major project was Stand by Me (1986), directed by Rob Reiner and based on Stephen King's novella The Body. The film follows four boys who embark on a journey to find the body of a missing boy. Evans and Gideon adapted the story for the screen, and Evans also served as a producer.

The filmmakers initially encountered resistance from studios, which were uncertain about the commercial appeal of a coming-of-age drama centered on four boys. In a retrospective interview, Evans and Gideon recalled the difficulties of finding backing for the project and discussed the response of Stephen King to their adaptation.

Stand by Me received an Independent Spirit Award nomination for Best Feature. Evans and Gideon's screenplay was also nominated for the Independent Spirit Award for Best Screenplay, the Writers Guild of America Award for Best Adapted Screenplay, and the Academy Award for Best Adapted Screenplay.

At the 59th Academy Awards, held on March 30, 1987, Evans and Gideon were nominated for Best Adapted Screenplay. The award was won by Ruth Prawer Jhabvala for A Room with a View.

=== Made in Heaven and directorial debut ===
Following Stand by Me, Evans and Gideon wrote and produced Made in Heaven (1987), a romantic fantasy directed by Alan Rudolph. The film stars Timothy Hutton and Kelly McGillis in a story about love and reincarnation. The production marked one of the duo's collaborations as both writers and producers.

In 1992, Evans made his feature-film directorial debut with Kuffs, an action comedy starring Christian Slater, Milla Jovovich and Tony Goldwyn. Evans and Gideon wrote the screenplay, while Gideon served as a producer. The film concerns a young man who takes over a private patrol organization in San Francisco following his brother's murder.

Kuffs received the Special Jury Prize at the 1992 Festival du Film Policier de Cognac.

=== Work during the 1990s ===
Evans and Gideon continued working on film projects during the 1990s. Evans produced Assassins (1995), an action thriller directed by Richard Donner and starring Sylvester Stallone and Antonio Banderas.

The pair received story credit for Cutthroat Island (1995), directed by Renny Harlin, after rewriting an earlier version of the screenplay. Evans later described the original material on which they had worked as substantially different from the finished film.

In 1997, Evans and Gideon wrote Jungle 2 Jungle, a comedy starring Tim Allen and Martin Short. The film was an American remake of the 1994 French comedy Un indien dans la ville.

After Jungle 2 Jungle, the two writers continued developing original screenplays and undertaking script rewrites, although several of their projects were never produced. Evans recalled that some of their proposed films, including a World War I romance, required budgets that studios were reluctant to approve.

=== Mr. Brooks ===
Evans returned to feature-film directing with Mr. Brooks (2007), fifteen years after Kuffs. He co-wrote the screenplay with Gideon and directed the psychological thriller, which stars Kevin Costner, Demi Moore, William Hurt, Dane Cook and Danielle Panabaker.

The story centers on Earl Brooks, a successful businessman and family man who secretly leads a second life as a serial killer. William Hurt portrays Marshall, a manifestation of Brooks's murderous impulses. The film's premise allowed Evans and Gideon to explore the contrast between the protagonist's respectable public identity and his hidden criminal behavior.

The writers initially conceived Mr. Brooks as a television series and pitched the idea to several producers and studios. Their original treatment was regarded as too mild, while a later, darker version presented other difficulties. They eventually developed the concept as a feature-film screenplay.

Evans explained in interviews surrounding the film's release that he and Gideon wanted to move away from the kinds of films with which they had previously been associated and create a darker story aimed at adult audiences. Returning to directing after fifteen years, Evans described the process as familiar despite his long absence from the director's chair.

=== Unrealized sequels and later projects ===
Around the release of Mr. Brooks, Evans discussed plans for two sequels that would continue the story of Earl Brooks. He also mentioned several other possible directing projects, including original screenplays and scripts written by other writers.

The planned sequels were never produced. In a June 2020 interview with Bloody Disgusting, Evans explained that neither had progressed to a completed screenplay. He outlined ideas for the continuation of the story, including the relationship between Brooks and his daughter, and the possible involvement of detective Tracy Atwood, played by Demi Moore in the original film.

Evans also cited complications concerning the rights to the property and the practical difficulties of reassembling the project. By 2020, he considered the prospect of the sequels being made extremely unlikely.

== Filmography ==
=== Film ===
Year	Title	Director	Writer	Producer	Notes
1979	A Man, a Woman, and a Bank	No	Yes	No	Screenplay and story
1984	Starman	No	Yes	Associate	
1986	Stand by Me	No	Yes	Yes	Academy Award nomination for Best Adapted Screenplay
1987	Made in Heaven	No	Yes	Yes	
1992	Kuffs	Yes	Yes	No	Directorial debut
1995	Assassins	No	No	Yes	
1995	Cutthroat Island	No	Yes	No	Story credit
1997	Jungle 2 Jungle	No	Yes	No	
2007	Mr. Brooks	Yes	Yes	No	

=== Script and continuity department ===
Year	Film	Role	Notes
1999	Any Given Sunday	Script revisions	Uncredited

=== Miscellaneous crew ===
Year	Film	Role
1989	Honey, I Shrunk the Kids	Production consultant

== Awards and nominations ==
Year	Award	Category	Film	Result
1987	Academy Awards	Best Adapted Screenplay, with Raynold Gideon	Stand by Me	Nominated
1987	Independent Spirit Awards	Best Screenplay, with Raynold Gideon	Stand by Me	Nominated
1987	Independent Spirit Awards	Best Feature, as producer	Stand by Me	Nominated
1987	Writers Guild of America Awards	Best Adapted Screenplay, with Raynold Gideon	Stand by Me	Nominated
1992	Festival du Film Policier de Cognac	Special Jury Prize	Kuffs	Won
