= Vicious Circle (album) =

Studio album by L.A. Guns
- Released: October 4, 1994
- Studio: Ocean Way (Hollywood); 4th Street Recorders (Santa Monica); Red Zone (Burbank, California)
- Genre: Heavy metal; hard rock; glam metal
- Length: 56:06
- Label: Polydor
- Producer: Jim Wirt; Michael James Jackson; (Crystal Eyes)

L.A. Guns chronology
Best Of: Hollywood a Go-Go (1994)	Vicious Circle (1994)	American Hardcore (1996)

Singles from L.A. Guns
- 1. "Long Time Dead" Released: 1994; 2. "Face Down" Released: 1994; 3. "Killing Machine" Released: 1994

Vicious Circle is the fourth album by American hard rock band L.A. Guns. The first single was "Long Time Dead". The band supported the album with a North American tour.

== Production ==
Michael "Bones" Gersema drums on several songs. "I'd Love to Change the World" is a cover of the Ten Years After song.

== Critical reception ==
Professional ratings
Review scores
Source	Rating
AllMusic	2/5 stars
Calgary Herald	A−
Chicago Tribune	1/4 stars
Collector's Guide to Heavy Metal	8/10
The Encyclopedia of Popular Music	3/5 stars
Rock Hard	8.0/10
The Tampa Tribune	3/4 stars

The Chicago Tribune stated that the band "hasn't wandered a bit from the glam metal they helped popularize in the late '80s—a raunchy sound that makes the true headbanger cringe," but conceded that the album "also features some danceable tunes." The Calgary Herald determined that "bow-taut guitar solos are slung against arrows of melody fired at the bulls-eye of '70s rock." The Tampa Tribune opined that "guitarist Tracii Guns' trigger-finger riffs still fire faster than a speeding bullet."

== Track listing ==
No.	Title	Writer(s)	Length
1.	"Face Down"	Kelly Nickels, Mick Cripps, Michael Gersema, Phil Lewis, Tracii Guns	4:11
2.	"No Crime"	Nickels, Gersema, Steve Dior	2:35
3.	"Long Time Dead"	Nickels, Cripps, Lewis, Guns	3:22
4.	"Killing Machine"	Nickels, Cripps, Lewis, Guns	3:27
5.	"Fade Away"	Nickels, Cripps, Gersema, Lewis, Guns	4:11
6.	"Tarantula" (instrumental)	Nickels, Cripps, Lewis, Guns	0:56
7.	"Crystal Eyes" (American and European bonus track)	Nickels, Cripps, Lewis, Steve Riley, Guns	5:53
8.	"Nothing Better to Do"	Nickels, Cripps, Lewis, Guns	2:52
9.	"Chasing the Dragon"	Nickels, Cripps, Gersema, Lewis, Guns	4:50
10.	"Kill That Girl"	Nickels, Cripps, Lewis, Guns	3:13
11.	"I'd Love to Change the World" (Ten Years After cover)	Alvin Lee	3:39
12.	"Who's in Control (Let 'Em Roll)"	Nickels, Cripps, Lewis, Guns	4:02
13.	"I'm the One"	Nickels, Cripps, Gersema, Lewis, Guns	2:28
14.	"Why Ain't I Bleeding"	Nickels, Cripps, Lewis, Guns	4:32
15.	"Kiss of Death"	Gersema, Lewis, Dior	5:55

Japanese edition bonus tracks
No.	Title	Writer(s)	Length
16.	"Death in America"	Nickels, Cripps, Gersema, Lewis, Guns	3:41
17.	"Empire Down"		3:29
Total length:			57:23

- Japan Edition has 16 tracks as it drops the track "Crystal Eyes"

== Personnel ==
- Phil Lewis – lead vocals except on "Nothing Better to Do", acoustic guitar
- Tracii Guns – lead guitar, acoustic guitar, backing vocals
- Mick Cripps – lead and rhythm guitar, piano, keyboards, bass on track 4, backing vocals
- Kelly Nickels – bass guitar, lead vocals on "Nothing Better to Do", backing vocals

Additional musicians

- Guy Griffin – acoustic guitar on track 15
- Michael “Bones” Gersema – drums on tracks 1, 5, 9, 13–17, backing vocals on tracks 1, 13 and 14
- Myron Grombacher – drums on tracks 2, 10–12
- Nickey Alexander – drums on track 4
- Steve Riley – drums on track 7
- Doni Gray – drums on track 8
- Steve Councel – harmonica on track 8, 14 and 15, backing vocals on track 8
- Cliff Brodsky – piano on track 8
- Steve Dior – backing vocals on track 2
- Jim Wirt – backing vocals

Production

- Jim Wirt – producer, engineer, mixing of tracks 6, 11 to 13
- Michael James Jackson – producer and engineer on "Crystal Eyes"
- Dan Daniel, Dennis Degher, Jeff Graham, Mark Shoffner, Marnie Riley, Tim Allison – assistant engineers
- Mick Guzauski – mixing of tracks 1 to 5, 7 to 10, 14, 15
- Stephen Marcussen – mastering
- Robert Bisbo – album cover art

== Charts ==
Chart (1995)	Peak position
Japanese Albums (Oricon)	58
UK Rock & Metal Albums (OCC)	13
