= American Hardcore (album) =

Studio album by L.A. Guns
- Released: October 29, 1996
- Studios: Red Zone Studios, Burbank, California
- Genre: Groove metal
- Length: 47:26
- Label: CMC International
- Producers: The L.A. Guns and Denis Degher

L.A. Guns chronology
Vicious Circle (1994)	American Hardcore (1996)	Hollywood Rehearsal (1997)

Professional ratings
Review scores
Source	Rating
AllMusic	2.5/5 stars
Collector's Guide to Heavy Metal	4/10

American Hardcore is the fifth album by the American rock band L.A. Guns. It is their only album to feature singer Chris Van Dahl and the first to feature bass guitarist Johnny Crypt. This album continues the increase in heaviness by the band started on their previous album Vicious Circle. The band was very influenced by Pantera during this time.

The band re-branded themselves "The L.A. Guns", at the time of the release of American Hardcore, adding 'the' before its name. According to Steve Riley, this was done to note the change in direction from the band's classic line-up fronted by Phil Lewis. Also according to Riley, during the recording of American Hardcore the band was still a five-piece, as bassist Kelly Nickels was very much part of the band and received co-writing credit on eight of the 12 tracks. He quit the band once they were dropped from PolyGram. Following Nickels' departure, second guitarist Johnny Crypt switched over to bass and the band remained a four-piece.

The opening track "F.N.A." was intended to sound like a disc skipping, and is rumored to be a portion of their cover song "Black Sabbath" - available on the Japanese import version of the album - simply played backwards. A hidden track can be found following an extended break at the 17 minute mark of the final track "I am Alive". The track features an exchange between a couple of prison guards discussing the pending execution of an inmate. According to Van Dahl, he did all the voices in one straight take.

Atomic Punks singer Ralph Saenz was recruited to replace Van Dahl after he was fired in 1997 to finish out the last couple months of the tour. The band, with Saenz, would still perform several of the songs from American Hardcore, including "Give". Saenz would subsequently stay with the band to record the Wasted EP in 1998.

== Track listing ==
All tracks are written by Chris Van Dahl, Tracii Guns, Johnny Crypt, Steve Riley, Kelly Nickels, except where noted.

No.	Title	Writer(s)	Length
1.	"F.N.A."	Van Dahl, Guns, Crypt, Riley	0:21
2.	"What I've Become"		3:37
3.	"Unnatural Act"	Van Dahl, Guns, Crypt, Riley	4:10
4.	"Give"		3:16
5.	"Don't Pray"		4:07
6.	"Pissed"		4:01
7.	"Mine"		3:35
8.	"Kevorkian"		4:47
9.	"Hey World"	Van Dahl, Guns, Crypt, Riley, Paul Black	5:01
10.	"Next Generation"		2:33
11.	"Hugs and Needles"		3:08
12.	"I Am Alive"	Van Dahl, Guns, Crypt, Riley	6:59
13.	"Hidden track" (referred to as "Skit" on iTunes, starts 10 minutes after "I Am Alive")		1:51

Japanese edition bonus track
No.	Title	Writer(s)	Length
14.	"Black Sabbath" (Black Sabbath cover)	Ozzy Osbourne, Tony Iommi, Geezer Butler, Bill Ward	7:18
Total length:			54:44

== Personnel ==
L.A. Guns

- Chris Van Dahl - lead vocals
- Tracii Guns - guitar, keyboards, backing vocals, mixing
- Johnny Crypt - bass guitar, backing vocals
- Steve Riley - drums, percussion, backing vocals

Additional musicians

- Tom Eyre - keyboards on track 12, strings arrangements
- Mark Noreyko, Scarlet Rivera - strings
- Scott King - mandolin and harmony vocals on track 9
- Franklin Rosell, Paul Alvarez, Riley Baxter, Denis Degher - additional gang vocals

Production

Kelly Moriarity - album cover artist

- Denis Degher - producer, engineer, mixing
- Brent Reilly - additional engineering
- Alan Yoshida - mastering at A&M Studios, Hollywood
