= Gregg Tripp =

American musician and songwriter

- Origin: United States
- Genres: Rock, pop rock, power pop
- Occupations: Singer-songwriter, musician
- Label: Impact

Gregg Tripp is an American musician and songwriter. He was especially active in the late 1980s and 1990s.

Tripp's only solo album (to date) is 1991's Tempus Edax Rerum on the record label Impact. However, the album's track "I Don't Want to Live Without You" became the love theme for the feature film Kuffs (1992), starring Christian Slater and Tony Goldwyn. It is featured several times during the film.

In 1992, he won the BMI Pop Award with his song "Heart of Stone".

Tripp has written songs performed by prominent artists of varying genres, including L.A. Guns, Taylor Dayne, Cinderella, and Vixen.
