= L.A. Guns (album) =

Studio album by L.A. Guns
- Released: January 4, 1988
- Recorded: June–August 1987
- Studios: The Village Recorder (West Los Angeles, California)
- Genre: Glam metal
- Length: 36:36
- Label: Vertigo
- Producer: Jim Faraci

L.A. Guns chronology
| Collector's Edition No. 1 (1985) | L.A. Guns (1988) | Cocked & Loaded (1989) |

Singles from L.A. Guns
- 1. "One More Reason" Released: January 1988; 2. "Sex Action" Released: March 1988; 3. "Electric Gypsy" Released: August 1988

L.A. Guns is the debut studio album by American glam metal band L.A. Guns. Recorded at The Village Recorder in West Los Angeles, it was produced by Jim Faraci and released on January 4, 1988, by Vertigo Records. The album is the only L.A. Guns release to feature drummer Nickey "Beat" Alexander, who was replaced by Steve Riley before it was released. "One More Reason", "Sex Action" and "Electric Gypsy" were released as the three singles from the album.

Material for the debut L.A. Guns release was drawn from the band's formative years. Songwriting credits were listed for all five band members, as well as former lead vocalist Paul Black. The album also includes cover versions of two songs by members' former projects. Early demo recordings of several songs were included on Hollywood Raw: The Original Sessions, while the reunited classic lineup of the band re-recorded a number of tracks for Greatest Hits and Black Beauties.

L.A. Guns was a minor domestic commercial success. The album spent 33 weeks on the Billboard 200 albums chart, peaking at number 50 in April 1988. It was also certified gold by the Recording Industry Association of America in 1993, certifying sales in excess of 500,000 units. Media response to L.A. Guns was generally positive. Critics highlighted the album as a standout of the 1980s "hair metal" scene, praising the balance of commercial compositions and heavier tracks.

In 2017, Metal Hammer included the album in their list of "the 10 hair metal albums you need in your record collection".

== Background ==
L.A. Guns signed a recording contract with major label PolyGram in 1987, and changed its lineup significantly at the same time. Lead vocalist Paul Black was replaced with former Girl and Tormé frontman Phil Lewis, former Faster Pussycat member Kelly Nickels joined on bass, and previous bassist Mick Cripps moved over to rhythm guitar to replace Robert Stoddard. The band commenced recording for its self-titled debut album in June. Recalling the process, Lewis reported that "We got the whole thing done in six weeks", adding that "we like that Sex Pistols type of edge and energy, so we decided to get in and out of the studio as quickly as possible." Sessions took place at The Village Recorder in West Los Angeles with producer Jim Faraci, who had most recently worked with glam metal bands Poison, Lizzy Borden and Ratt.

Prior to its release, 1,500 advance copies of L.A. Guns were sent to rock clubs, music retailers and radio stations. PolyGram's Steve Kleinberg commented at the time that "We wanted to create a ground swell, and it seems to be working. Our preorders on the album are more than 65,000, and a number of major retailers have yet to place their orders." "One More Reason", "Sex Action" and "Electric Gypsy" were released as singles, all with music videos directed by Ralph Ziman. Videos were also produced for "One Way Ticket" and "Cry No More" by Phillip Detchmendy, and for "Bitch Is Back", "No Mercy" and "Nothing to Lose" by Ziman and Katy Lynne. The album was promoted on a three-month United States concert tour starting on January 15, 1988, including dates supporting Ted Nugent and AC/DC.

All five members of the band are credited for songwriting on L.A. Guns. Some tracks feature co-writing credits for former vocalist Black. The album also features cover versions of Lewis's former band Girl's "Hollywood Tease", and Nickels's former band Sweet Pain's "Shoot for Thrills". L.A. Guns is the only studio album by the band to feature drummer Nickey "Beat" Alexander, who was replaced by Steve Riley before it was released. In 1999, the reunited "classic lineup" of the band recorded new versions of several songs for Greatest Hits and Black Beauties. "Sex Action" was also later included on the 2002 release Ultimate L.A. Guns, alongside a range of other previously released re-recordings and live tracks. Early demo recordings of several tracks were included on the album Hollywood Raw: The Original Sessions.

== Music ==
The track "Electric Gypsy" is considered by some to be among the heaviest glam metal tracks. Revolver said "the rhythm section takes the curves too fast for love."

== Reception ==
Professional ratings
Review scores
| Source | Rating |
|---|---|
| AllMusic | 4.5/5 stars |
| The Collector's Guide to Heavy Metal | 6/10 |

Upon its release, L.A. Guns debuted at number 138 on the US Billboard 200. It spent a total of 33 weeks on the chart, peaking at number 50 in April. In 1993, the album was certified gold by the Recording Industry Association of America for domestic sales in excess of 500,000 certified units. Outside of the US, the album reached number 88 on the RPM Canadian Albums Chart, number 67 on the Japanese Albums Chart, and number 73 on the UK Albums Chart.

Media response to L.A. Guns was generally positive. Billboard noted that the album "evinces a hard but often pop-conscious sound", predicting that L.A. Guns would prove popular with fans of groups like Bon Jovi. The review added that the songwriting on the album was "unspectacular", but concluded that "energy's there, and that counts in this genre". Cash Box outlined that the band was "creating quite a stir at both radio and retail", suggesting that L.A. Guns would "push [the] band into the forefront of the national rock scene". Hit Parader called it "a nasty, naughty, noxious notion of what an L.A. band is all about". In a retrospective review of the album, AllMusic's Eduardo Rivadavia described L.A. Guns as "a wildly over-the-top rock and roll album", praising it for "rock[ing] with a bile and fury not seen since Mötley Crüe's Shout at the Devil". Rivadavia also highlighted the balance between "Shit-kicking anthems" such as "No Mercy," "Sex Action" and "Bitch Is Back", and "more commercial but equally hot offerings" such as "Electric Gypsy" and "Down in the City". Canadian journalist Martin Popoff described L.A. Guns as "a street version of Kiss or a glossy version of the Crüe", and their music as "plausible, no frills California metal".

== Track listing ==
| No. | Title | Writer(s) | Length |
|---|---|---|---|
| 1. | "No Mercy" | Tracii Guns; Mick Cripps; Phil Lewis; Nickey Alexander | 2:45 |
| 2. | "Sex Action" | Guns; Lewis; Paul Black | 3:38 |
| 3. | "One More Reason" | Guns; Lewis; Black | 3:05 |
| 4. | "Electric Gypsy" | Guns; Lewis | 3:24 |
| 5. | "Nothing to Lose" | Cripps; Lewis; Robert Stoddard; Black | 4:12 |
| 6. | "Bitch Is Back" | Guns; Cripps; Lewis; Black | 2:50 |
| 7. | "Cry No More" (instrumental) | Guns | 1:20 |
| 8. | "One Way Ticket" | Guns; Black | 4:17 |
| 9. | "Hollywood Tease" (Girl cover) | Lewis; Phil Collen | 2:43 |
| 10. | "Shoot for Thrills" (Sweet Pain cover) | Kelly Nickels | 4:24 |
| 11. | "Down in the City" | Nickels; Guns | 3:58 |
| Total length: | | | 36:36 |

Japanese reissue bonus track
| No. | Title | Writer(s) | Length |
|---|---|---|---|
| 12. | "Winters Fool" | Guns; Cripps; Lewis; Nickels; Steve Riley; Black | 3:38 |
| Total length: | | | 40:14 |

== Personnel ==
L.A. Guns

- Phil Lewis – lead vocals
- Tracii Guns – lead guitar
- Mick Cripps – rhythm guitar, keyboards, backing vocals
- Kelly Nickels – bass, harmonica, whistle, backing vocals
- Nickey "Beat" Alexander – drums (tracks 1–11)
- Steve Riley – drums (track 12)

Production personnel

- Jim Faraci – production, engineering
- Charlie Brocco – engineering

Additional musicians

- Howard Benson – string arrangements (tracks 7 and 8)
- Alan Jones – tenor and baritone saxophones (track 5)
- Paul Kaufman – washboard (track 11)

Packaging personnel

- Michael Bays – art direction
- Mitchell Kanner – design
- John Scarpati – photography

== Charts ==
| Chart (1988) | Peak position |
|---|---|
| Canada Top Albums/CDs (RPM) | 88 |
| Japanese Albums (Oricon) | 67 |
| UK Albums (Official Charts) | 73 |
| US Billboard 200 | 50 |

== Certifications ==
| Region | Certification | Certified units/sales |
|---|---|---|
| United States (RIAA) | Gold | 500,000^{^} |
^{^} Shipments figures based on certification alone.
