= Kuffs =

1992 film directed by Bruce A. Evans

- Theatrical release poster
- Directed by: Bruce A. Evans
- Written by: Bruce A. Evans; Raynold Gideon
- Produced by: Raynold Gideon
- Starring: Christian Slater; Tony Goldwyn; Milla Jovovich; Bruce Boxleitner
- Cinematography: Thomas Del Ruth
- Edited by: Stephen Semel
- Music by: Harold Faltermeyer
- Production companies: Dino De Laurentiis Communications; Evans/Gideon Productions
- Distributed by: Universal Pictures
- Release date: January 10, 1992
- Running time: 102 minutes
- Country: United States
- Language: English
- Budget: $10–12 million
- Box office: $21.1 million

Kuffs is a 1992 American action comedy film directed by Bruce A. Evans and produced by Raynold Gideon. It stars Christian Slater, Tony Goldwyn, Milla Jovovich, and Ashley Judd in her film debut. The plot follows an officer of the San Francisco Patrol Special Police (SFPSP), a private for-hire auxiliary police force separate from the San Francisco Police Department (SFPD), that has officers assign themselves specific areas and work on a for-hire basis.

== Plot ==
George Kuffs, an irresponsible 21-year-old high school dropout from San Francisco, has walked out on his pregnant girlfriend Maya. Having lost his job and with no other prospects, George visits his brother, Brad, to ask for money. Brad serves as an officer in the SFPSP. Brad, unwilling to loan George any money, suggests George join him as a Patrol Special in the district he owns and work under him. Before George can decide on accepting the offer, Brad is shot by a man named Kane, whom George sees holding the gun; Kane drops the gun and nonchalantly walks away from the scene, while Brad is rushed to the hospital.

George is brought in for a lineup where he identifies Kane as the shooter, but the SFPD is forced to release him because George did not actually see Kane, who had worn gloves to prevent fingerprints, fire the gun. Shortly after, George is told by Captain Morino, a friend of Brad's, that Brad died from his injuries and that George has been bequeathed Brad's district. Local businessman Sam Jones tries to purchase the district so he can control it, but George decides to keep it and train to be a police officer. Seen as unskilled and rude, George draws the ire of his fellow Patrol Specials and Officer Ted Bukowsky, an SFPD liaison who has been assigned to work with the SFPSP as punishment for having an affair with the police chief's wife. George spikes Ted's coffee with sleeping pills while on duty, resulting in Ted getting suspended.

After George is shot and wounded by a suicidal writer, his life begins to improve. He cracks a criminal enterprise run out of a Chinese dry cleaner (run by Jones), gaining respect and admiration from his fellow officers; he also reconnects with Maya. George avenges Brad's murder by killing Kane in self-defense after a failed ambush in George's apartment. His joy is short lived, however, after Jones gives George's high school transcript to the SFPSP—proving George is ineligible to be a police officer because he never graduated—and declares he will take control of the district.

George continues to track Jones and seeks out the still-suspended Ted for help. They wind up in a rooftop shootout with Jones' goons and are eventually assisted by the rest of the SFPSP. George corners Jones in the lowest level of a parking garage and fatally shoots him in self-defense.

George marries Maya, who gives birth to a baby girl named Sarah. At Maya's suggestion, he takes the high school equivalency exam and passes, allowing him to continue working as an officer. He also takes out a loan to expand his brother's district.

== Cast ==
- Christian Slater as Officer George Kuffs
- Milla Jovovich as Maya Carlton
- Tony Goldwyn as Officer Ted Bukovsky
- Bruce Boxleitner as Officer Brad Kuffs
- Troy Evans as Captain Morino
- George de la Peña as Sam Jones
- Leon Rippy as Kane
- Mary Ellen Trainor as Officer Nikki Allyn
- Joshua Cadman as Officer Bill Donnelly
- Kim Robillard as Peter Coca
- Aki Aleong as Mr. Chang
- Henry G. Sanders as Building Owner
- Lu Leonard as Harriet
- Dennis Holahan as Dr. Will Carlton
- Patricia J. Earnest as Mrs. Carlton
- Craig Benton as Paint Store Owner
- Ashley Judd as Wife of Paint Store Owner
- Alexandra Paul as Chief's Wife (uncredited)
- Thunder as Self (Dog)

== Production ==
Kuffs was written directly for the screen by Evans and Gideon, both of whom had Slater in mind for the title role. Slater said he took the role in part because he wanted to avoid doing accents or worrying about historical accuracy, as in his previous two roles. Because of his popularity as a teen idol, Slater said he was asked to do a scene in his underwear. He refused, saying that it was too gratuitous.

The film was shot in San Francisco and Los Angeles.

== Release ==
Kuffs was released in the United States on January 10, 1992. It opened in fifth place and grossed $5.7 million in its opening weekend. The final US gross was $21.1 million. Kuffs continued an 18-month dry spell for Universal Pictures in which they did not score a hit. The film's theatrical poster, which depicts Slater smiling and holding a pistol, was compared to that of Juice's poster, which Paramount Pictures airbrushed to remove a pistol. Further comparisons between the films led Richard Harrington of The Washington Post to question whether racism led the Motion Picture Association of America to rate Kuffs PG-13 and Juice R. Jack Valenti, president of the MPAA, denied racism had anything to do with it and said it was based solely on parental concerns. In Dallas, Texas, the regional ratings board overrode the MPAA rating with an R rating for violent content.

Kuffs was released on home video in June 1992.

== Reception ==
Rotten Tomatoes, a review aggregator, reports that 26% of 19 surveyed critics gave the film a positive rating. Audiences polled by CinemaScore gave the film an average grade of "B+" on an A+ to F scale.

Variety criticized the film's tone and said that it is "very reminiscent of several Eddie Murphy films". Caryn James of The New York Times wrote that the film takes itself too seriously in parts where it should have used humor, though it will appeal to teenage fans of Slater and action films. Kevin Thomas of the Los Angeles Times wrote that the violent scenes make the comedic elements difficult to enjoy. Desson Howe of The Washington Post wrote, "This movie wasn't scripted. It was shoplifted." Lou Cedrone of The Baltimore Sun called it a "very good action comedy" that "sneaks up on you" with its humor. Gary Thompson of the Philadelphia Daily News rated it 2.5/4 stars and wrote the film's absurdity makes it "strangely entertaining", though it is not intelligently written enough to work as a whole. People, while acknowledging the film is not original, said that Slater carries the film. TV Guide rated it 2/4 stars and called it "one of [Slater's] best roles to date", though the film's violence and uneven tone make it "difficult to recommend to anyone but die-hard action fans".

== Soundtrack ==
An original soundtrack album was released on July 6, 1992, under the label Stage & Screen; the soundtrack features songs mainly by German synthpop musician Harold Faltermeyer. It did not include the main theme song, a theme called "I Don't Want To Live Without You", by the American musician Gregg Tripp.
