= The Ballad of Jayne =

1989 single by L.A. Guns

Single by L.A. Guns

from the album Cocked & Loaded
- B-side: "The Ballad of Jayne (LP Version)"
- Released: 1989
- Genre: Glam metal
- Length: 3:59 (7"); 4:30 (album version)
- Label: Polygram
- Songwriters: Steve Diamond; Kelly Nickels; Mick Cripps; Steve Riley; Tracii Guns; Phil Lewis
- Producers: Duane Baron; John Purdell; Tom Werman

L.A. Guns singles chronology
"Never Enough" (1989)	"The Ballad of Jayne" (1989)	"I Wanna Be Your Man" (1989)

Music video
- "The Ballad of Jayne" on YouTube

"The Ballad of Jayne" (originally spelled "The Ballad of Jane" on early pressings of the album) is a power ballad by American glam metal band L.A. Guns from their second album, Cocked & Loaded (1989). The song was released in 1989 and is said to have been written about actress and Playmate Jayne Mansfield (this has been debunked by Tracii Guns.) The song reached numbers 31 and 33 on the US Cash Box Top 100 and Billboard Hot 100 charts in 1990, and number 25 on the Billboard Mainstream Rock chart. The song was also slightly successful in the United Kingdom, reaching number 53 in 1991. It ranked number 93 on VH1's 100 Greatest One-Hit Wonders of the '80s in 2009.

== Charts ==
Chart (1990–1991)	Peak position
UK Singles (OCC)	53
US Billboard Hot 100	33
US Mainstream Rock (Billboard)	25
US Cash Box Top 100	31
