= Best Of: Hollywood a Go-Go =

Greatest hits album by L.A. Guns
- Released: May 24, 1994
- Recorded: 1987–1994
- Genre: Glam metal
- Label: Mercury

L.A. Guns chronology
Cuts (1992)	Best Of: Hollywood a Go-Go (1994)	Vicious Circle (1994)

Best Of: Hollywood a Go-Go is an L.A. Guns Greatest Hits album released in Japan in 1996.

It is one of the only LA Guns albums bearing the name 'Best of' truly being a Best of, as opposed to re-recordings of hits albums like Greatest Hits and Black Beauties. Also, the album cover is a parody of the album cover of the soundtrack for the movie "American Graffiti".

== Track listing ==
1. "Sex Action"
2. "Never Enough"
3. "Electric Gypsy"
4. "Kiss My Love Goodbye"
5. "Ballad of Jayne"
6. "One More Reason"
7. "Wild Obsession"
8. "Kill That Girl"
9. "Rip and Tear"
10. "No Mercy"
11. "Killing Machine"
12. "Dirty Luv"
13. "Malaria"
14. "Long Time Dead"
15. "Some Lie 4 Love"
16. "Face Down"
17. "Hollywood Tease"
18. "I Wanna Be Your Man"
19. "Sex Action" (live)
