= Hollywood Raw: The Original Sessions =

Compilation album by L.A. Guns
- Released: 2004
- Recorded: 1987 (CD1); 1985 (CD2)
- Genre: Hard rock, glam metal
- Length: 55:59
- Label: Deadline

L.A. Guns chronology
Rips the Covers Off (2004)	Hollywood Raw: The Original Sessions (2004)	20th Century Masters (2005)

Professional ratings
Review scores
Source	Rating
AllMusic	3.5/5 stars

Hollywood Raw: The Original Sessions is an L.A. Guns album of previously unreleased recordings from 1987. Re-recorded versions of some of these songs later appeared on the band's eponymous first album.

Collector's Edition No. 1 has been re-released as a bonus CD with this album.

== Track listing ==
The track "Instrumental" has no writing credits, Published by Copyright Control.²

CD1 (1987)
No.	Title	Writer(s)	Length
1.	"Soho"	Phil Lewis	2:53
2.	"Nothing to Lose"	Cripps, Stoddard, Riley, Guns	4:03
3.	"Bitch Is Back"	Cripps, Black, Lewis, Riley, Guns	2:55
4.	"Down in the City"	Nickels, Guns	4:02
5.	"Electric Gypsy"	Nickels, Cripps, Lewis, Riley, Guns	3:24
6.	"Instrumental"		0:37
7.	"Guilty"	Lewis, Rivera	3:03
8.	"Hollywood Tease"	Laffy, Collen, Lewis	2:52
9.	"Sex Action"	Black, Lewis, Guns	3:37
10.	"Midnight Alibi"	Phil Lewis	3:30
11.	"One More Reason"	Nickels, Cripps, Black, Lewis, Riley, Guns	3:35
12.	"One Way Ticket"	Black, Guns	4:41
13.	"Shoot for Thrills"	Kelly Nickels	4:15
14.	"Winter's Fool"	Black, Guns	3:51
15.	"Alice in the Wasteland"	Black, Guns	4:05

CD2 (1985)
No.	Title	Length
1.	"Don't Love Me"	4:36
2.	"When Dreams Don't Follow Through"	3:32
3.	"It's Not True"	2:46
4.	"Something Heavy"	2:22
