= Nickey Alexander =

American drummer

- Also known as: "Beat"
- Born: Jeffrey Ivisovich
- Genres: Hard rock, Punk rock, Glam metal
- Occupation: Drummer
- Instrument: Drums
- Years active: 1975-present
- Formerly of: L.A. Guns; The Weirdos; Germs; The Cramps; The Mau Maus

Nickey Alexander (a.k.a. Nickey Beat) is an American drummer.

== Biography ==
Born Jeffrey Ivisovich, Nickey Beat lived in San Pedro, Los Angeles before moving to Hollywood to focus on music. There in 1977, alongside Cliff Roman and brothers, John and Dix Denney, he founded The Weirdos. He left the band by 1980, and rejoined in 1988 through 1991.

In 1978, he briefly joined The Germs, appearing on the Lexicon Devil EP.

In 1983, he joined The Dickies but left a year later. In 1984, he was involved with The Mau Maus, replacing future L.A. Guns vocalist Paul Black on drums.

In 1985, Alexander joined L.A. Guns. He played drums on the band's debut album, L.A. Guns in 1987, before leaving the band prior to the album's 1988 release. He later guested on 1994’s Vicious Circle. He also appears on the compilation albums Black City Breakdown (1985-1986), Hollywood Raw, and Black List. From 2006 to 2007, Alexander played for Tracii Guns's version of L.A. Guns, after the emergence of two different bands using the same name.

In 1989, Alexander performed with the short-lived band H.A.T.E. which also included Fishbone vocalist Angelo Moore, as well as John Frusciante and Flea of the Red Hot Chili Peppers as members.

Nickey played drums for The Cramps from 1991 to 1993.
