= Greatest Hits and Black Beauties =

Studio album by L.A. Guns
- Released: November 15, 1999
- Genre: Glam metal
- Length: 50:49
- Label: Cleopatra

L.A. Guns chronology
| Shrinking Violet (1999) | Greatest Hits and Black Beauties (1999) | Live: A Night on the Strip (2000) |

Professional ratings
Review scores
| Source | Rating |
|---|---|
| Allmusic | link |

Greatest Hits and Black Beauties is an album by L.A. Guns. Although the title would indicate that the album featured the group's biggest hits, it is in fact more accurately described as a unique studio album, featuring re-recordings of older L.A. Guns songs in a newer style, along with a handful of new tracks.

Three years later, the band released an album with a similarly misleading title, Ultimate LA Guns, presented as the band's second greatest hits album (following Best Of: Hollywood a Go-Go); however, this release included the same re-recordings featured on Greatest Hits and Black Beauties instead of the original hit versions of the songs.

== Track listing ==
1. "Bricks"
2. "One More Reason"
3. "Ritual"
4. "Electric Gypsy"
5. "No Mercy"
6. "Sex Action"
7. "Rip N Tear"
8. "Disbelief"
9. "Ballad of Jayne"
10. "Time"
11. "Heartful of Soul"
12. "3 Minute Atomic Egg"
13. "One More Reason" (Julian Beeston remix)
14. "Sex Action" (Intra-Venus remix)
- "Heartful of Soul" is a cover of a Yardbirds song.

== Line up ==
- Phil Lewis - lead vocals
- Tracii Guns - guitar
- Mick Cripps - guitar
- Kelly Nickels - bass
- Steve Riley - drums

== Reception ==
AllMusic opined that "Greatest Hits and Black Beauties is really not a hits collection at all, but rather re-recordings of some of the band's best-known songs ... what's more, some of the re-recordings find vocalist Phil Lewis straining to hit higher notes, sometimes even altering the melodies to compensate for his diminished vocal range ... unless you're a completest, avoid this one".
