= Hollywood Vampires (L.A. Guns album) =

Studio album by L.A. Guns
- Released: June 25, 1991
- Recorded: Fall 1990
- Studios: Ocean Way, Hollywood, California; Rumbo, Canoga Park, California; 4th Street Recorders, Santa Monica, California; Studio 55; The Fortess; Paramount Studios; Soundcastle Studios; Original Sound Studios; Beat Street Studios; Track Recorders; Studio II, Hollywood California
- Genre: Pop metal
- Length: 52:18
- Label: PolyGram/Polydor
- Producer: Michael James Jackson

L.A. Guns chronology
Cocked & Loaded (1989)	Hollywood Vampires (1991)	Holiday Foreplay (1991)

Singles from Hollywood Vampires
- 1. "Kiss My Love Goodbye" Released: 1991; 2. "Some Lie 4 Love" Released: 1991; 3. "Over the Edge" Released: 1991; 4. "It's Over Now" Released: 1992

Professional ratings
Review scores
Source	Rating
AllMusic	3/5 stars
Collector's Guide to Heavy Metal	7/10

Hollywood Vampires is the third studio album by the American glam metal band L.A. Guns, released in 1991. While no track from the album topped the charts (and the band's success declined soon afterwards as their style fell out of commercial favor), the album has a more melodic pop metal sound than the band's previous albums, with many background harmony vocals, layered guitars and additional keyboard tracks.

The album starts in a more somber note with "Over the Edge", which was used in the film Point Break, but the bulk of it consists of standard hard rockers, such as "Kiss My Love Goodbye" and "My Koo Ka Choo". The band aims for the ballad hit several times, in "Crystal Eyes", "It's Over Now" and the 1950s-style "I Found You", attempting to repeat the earlier success of their major single "The Ballad of Jayne". "Kiss my Love Goodbye" is featured in the 1992 comedy film Ladybugs.

The Japan pressing adds the original version of "Ain't the Same" from the Cuts EP, with the addition of several saxophone solos. The original CD and cassette releases featured a 3D photo cover and a small pair of 3D glasses was included designed by John Kosh.

== Track listing ==
All tracks are written by Mick Cripps, Tracii Guns, Phil Lewis, Kelly Nickels and Steve Riley except where noted.

No.	Title	Writer(s)	Length
1.	"Over the Edge"		5:41
2.	"Some Lie 4 Love"		3:34
3.	"Kiss My Love Goodbye"	L.A. Guns/Steve Diamond	4:42
4.	"Here It Comes"		4:37
5.	"Crystal Eyes"		5:54
6.	"Wild Obsession"		4:14
7.	"Dirty Luv"		4:29
8.	"My Koo Ka Choo"	L.A. Guns/Jim Vallance	4:06
9.	"It's Over Now"	L.A. Guns/Vallance	4:10
10.	"Snake Eyes Boogie"		2:56
11.	"I Found You"		3:43
12.	"Big House"		4:12
Total length:			52:35

Japanese edition bonus track
No.	Title	Length
13.	"Ain't the Same"	4:16

== Personnel ==
L.A. Guns

- Phil Lewis – lead vocals
- Tracii Guns – lead guitar, backing vocals, 6 and 12-string acoustic guitar, slide guitar, theremin
- Mick Cripps – guitar, backing vocals, acoustic guitar, slide guitar, keyboards, string arrangements
- Kelly Nickels – bass, backing vocals
- Steve Riley – drums, percussion, backing vocals

Additional musicians

- Kevin Savigar – string arrangements
- John Townsend – additional backing vocals

Production

- Michael James Jackson – production, engineering
- Chris Minto, Micajah Ryan, Pat Regan, Will Rogers – engineering
- Jamie Seyberth, Jim Wirt, Ken Allroyd – assistant engineering
- David Thoener, Micajah Ryan, Mick Guzauski – mixing at A&M Studios, Conway Studios and Lighthouse Studios, Hollywood, California
- Rob Jazco, Ed Korengo, Gil Morales, Kevin Becka – assistant mixing
- Stephen Marcussen – mastering at Precision Lacquer, Los Angeles
- Mark Sullivan – production coordination

== Charts ==
Chart (1991)	Peak position
Australian Albums (ARIA)	91
Japanese Albums (Oricon)	20
Swiss Albums (Schweizer Hitparade)	28
UK Albums (Official Charts)	44
US Billboard 200	42
