= Steve Riley (drummer) =

American drummer (1956–2023)

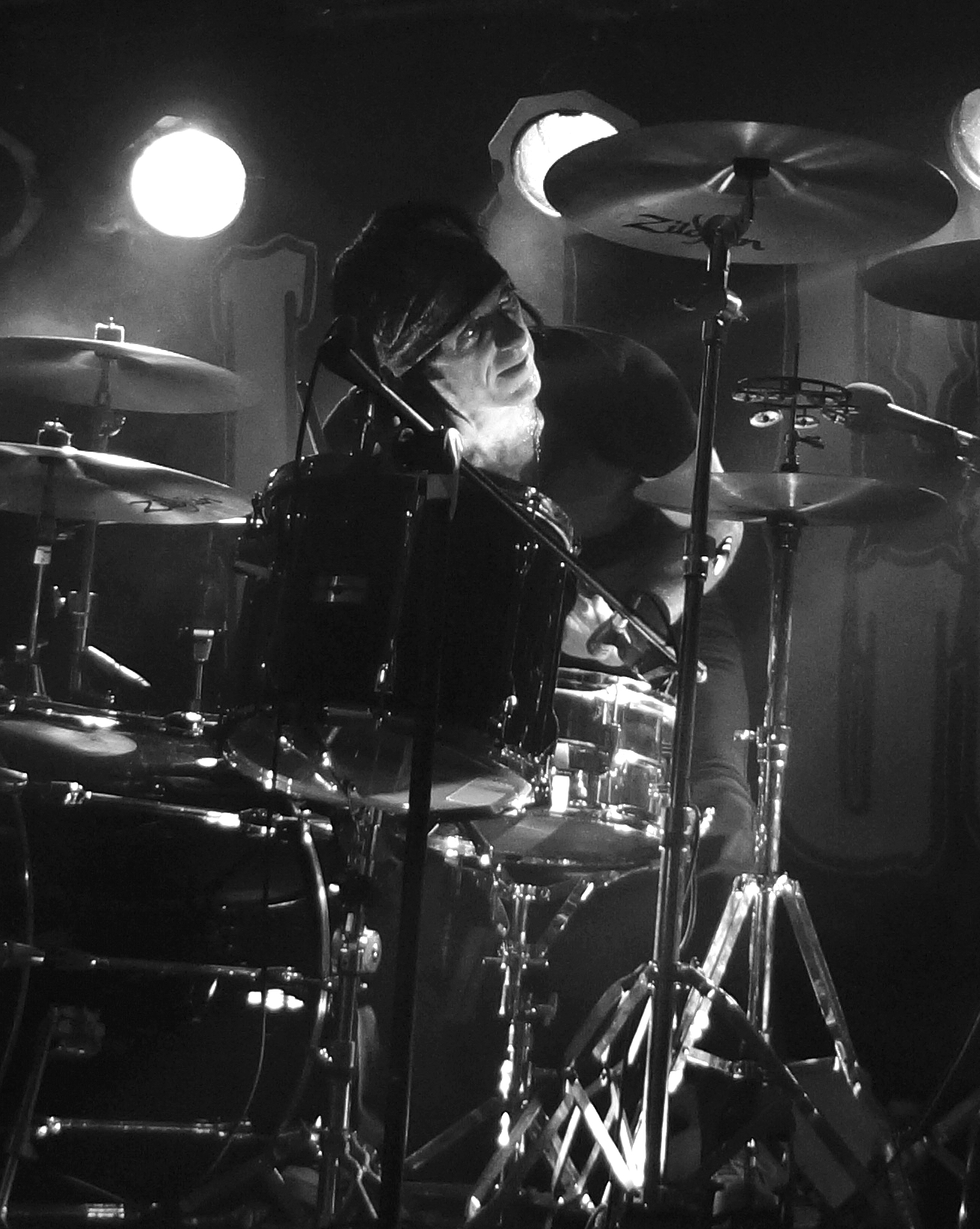
- Riley performing with L.A. Guns in 2012

Background information
- Born: January 22, 1956; Revere, Massachusetts, U.S.
- Died: October 24, 2023 (aged 67)
- Genres: Hard rock, heavy metal, glam metal
- Occupation: Drummer
- Years active: 1976–2023
- Formerly of: L.A. Guns; W.A.S.P.; Roadmaster; Keel

Steve Riley (January 22, 1956 – October 24, 2023) was an American rock drummer, best known for his work with Keel, W.A.S.P., and L.A. Guns.

== Career ==
Riley was born and raised in the Boston suburb of Revere, Massachusetts. After graduating high school in the 1970s, he moved to Los Angeles to pursue a music career. In 1979, he joined a revival of Steppenwolf, but the lineup broke up later that year.

Riley joined up-and-coming L.A. band Keel and recorded their breakthrough album The Right to Rock with them in 1984. Later that year, Riley departed Keel to replace founding member Tony Richards in W.A.S.P., another L.A. band whose debut album had recently achieved gold status in sales. As a member of W.A.S.P., Riley performed on the albums The Last Command, Inside the Electric Circus, and Live... in the Raw. Vocalist Ron Keel has described Riley as "driven to succeed and to play". Keel applauded Riley's decision to leave his band for the opportunity with W.A.S.P., saying "I mean, you've got to be ready for those opportunities when they knock". Keel and Riley had remained friends. However, Keel did not give Steve Riley full credit on the recording of the album The Right to Rock instead crediting Dwain Miller the replacement drummer. This remained a source of upset to Riley for many years.

Riley left W.A.S.P. and immediately joined rising Sunset Strip band L.A. Guns in 1987, becoming part of the band's "classic" lineup alongside guitarists Tracii Guns and Mick Cripps, vocalist Phil Lewis and bassist Kelly Nickels. He appeared on the albums Cocked & Loaded, and Hollywood Vampires. Riley was fired from the band in 1992 but returned in 1995.

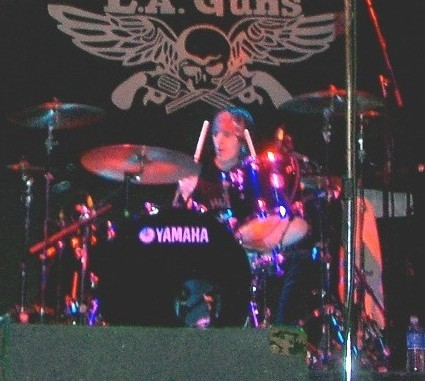
Riley performing in 2008

In 2006, there were two L.A. Guns lineups, Phil Lewis's and Tracii Guns's. Riley was a member of Lewis's lineup until it folded in 2016 when merging with Guns's version. Subsequently, Riley created his own version of L.A. Guns in 2019. This version released an album, Renegades, through Golden Robot Records. Following lawsuits over the band name, a settlement was reached in April 2021, allowing this band to continue as Riley's L.A. Guns.

Riley also starred as Billy the Bartender in the 2021 American horror slasher film, Blackstock Boneyard directed by Andre Alfa.

== Personal life ==
Riley had a wife named Mary Louise and a son named Cole. He also had two brothers named Michael and Daniel. He was a passionate fan of the Boston Red Sox and Boston Celtics, and was described by his family as a "World War II buff".

Riley had ambitions to write and publish a memoir of his experiences in the LA metal scene, saying "I have a lot of good stories to share. I have a lot of behind the scenes stories and a lot of photos that I'd like to share too that people haven't seen." Ultimately, his touring schedule made the project impossible to complete.

=== Illness and death ===
Riley died with his family present on October 24, 2023, at the age of 67 after a severe case of pneumonia. He had been battling the illness for several weeks. He had reportedly suffered from various health issues in the years prior to his death.

== Discography ==
=== With Roadmaster ===
- Roadmaster (1976)

=== With the Lawyers ===
- The Lawyers (1981)

=== With the B'zz ===
- Get Up (1982)

=== With Keel ===
- The Right to Rock (1985)

=== With W.A.S.P. ===
- The Last Command (1985)
- Inside the Electric Circus (1986)
- Live... in the Raw (1987)

=== With L.A. Guns ===
- L.A. Guns (1988) (Track 12)
- Cocked & Loaded (1989)
- Hollywood Vampires (1991)
- Cuts (1992) (Tracks 5-7)
- American Hardcore (1996)
- Wasted (1998)
- Shrinking Violet (1999)
- Greatest Hits and Black Beauties (1999)
- Man in the Moon (2001)
- Waking the Dead (2002)
- Rips the Covers Off (2004)
- Tales from the Strip (2005)
- Covered in Guns (2010)
- Hollywood Forever (2012)

Riley's L.A. Guns

- Renegades (2020)
- The Dark Horse (2024)
