= Paul Black (musician) =

American singer and drummer

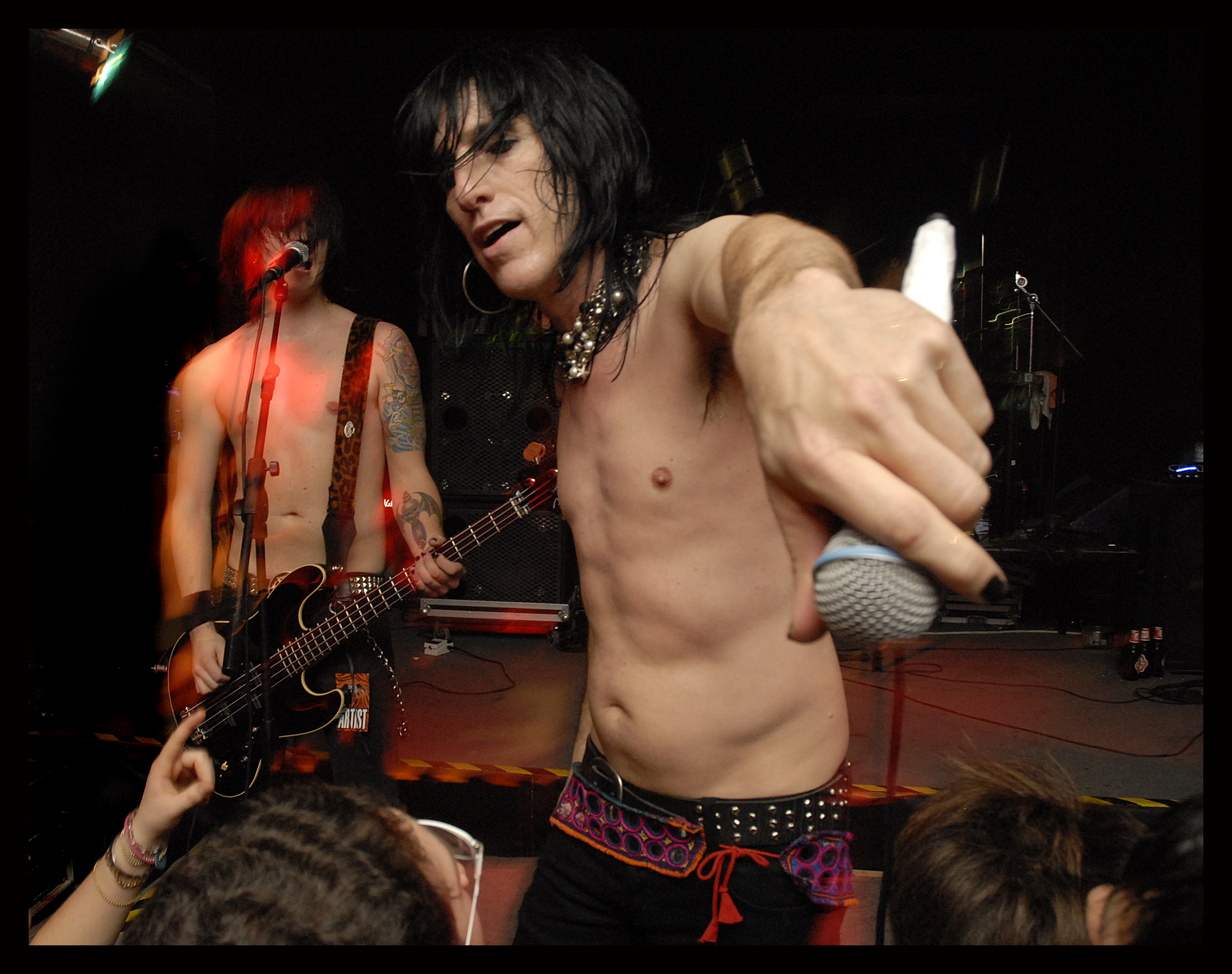
- Paul Black performing in 2007

Background information
- Also known as: Paul Mars
- Born: Paul Martin Marmorstein; March 17, 1959 (age 67); San Francisco, California, U.S.
- Genre: Glam metal
- Instruments: Vocals, drums

Paul Mars Black (born Paul Martin Marmorstein; March 17, 1959) is an American singer and drummer. He is most notable for his time as lead vocalist in L.A. Guns, with whom he wrote most of their self-titled debut album.

== Early life and career ==
Born in San Francisco, California, Black's roots were in bluegrass. In the 1970s, his high school rock band was called Your Mother. He also played in several jazz cover bands. In 1978, he was a percussion major at San Jose State University.

Black moved to Los Angeles in May 1980, still using his given name, Paul Martin Marmorstein. His first L.A. band was Mad Captions who played CBGB in New York and The Hot Club in Philadelphia with The Dead Boys. In 1981, Paul joined The Mau Maus, a Los Angeles–based punk band which was fronted by vocalist Rick Wilder, formerly of glam rock band, The Berlin Brats. During Paul's time with The Mau Maus, he shortened his name to "Paul Mars." In 1984, Paul Mars was replaced Nickey "Beat" Alexander in The Mau Maus and he subsequently joined The Joneses, recording the drums for Keeping Up With The Joneses.

Black, along with the rest of the 1981 lineup, rejoined The Mau Maus in 2011 to record their long delayed first album, Scorched Earth Policies: Then and Now. Black was the featured drummer in both the aborted 1983 sessions originally produced by Robbie Krieger (who also played guitar on the first track) of The Doors and the new latter eight songs produced by Geza X in 2011. The album was released in 2012.

== L.A. Guns ==
Black began putting together a side project for his songs to be called "Faster Pussycat" with guitarist Mick Cripps. Black switched to lead vocals, Cripps switched to bass, and the two joined guitarist Tracii Guns and drummer Nickey "Beat" Alexander and later on guitarist Robert Stoddard to complete this line-up.

The name was switched to L.A. Guns because the owner of the name, Raz Cue, offered to back the band if this line-up would re-use L.A. Guns, a name which had been abandoned over a year prior by a former band of Guns' (Guns N' Roses). Black changed his name again to Paul Black. From 1985 to March 1987, Paul Black wrote and co-wrote a number of songs, which led L.A. Guns to a record deal with Polygram Records. However, Black left before the record was finished and before the deal was signed. Black was replaced by Phil Lewis.

After leaving L.A. Guns, Black formed Black Cherry, which quickly became one of the most popular and sought after bands in L.A. But, a lawsuit filed by Black against his former band L.A. Guns and Polygram Records kept Black Cherry from signing a deal. One of the founding members of Black Cherry was guitarist/vocalist Bartt Warburton, who is currently known as "Ukulele Bartt." Warburton and Black have performed intermittently as “Black and Bartt,” as recently as 2024. Warburton also continues to perform on guitar/vocals with his hard rockabilly trio, The Eyeball Cowboys. Black retired in 1993 and seldom played shows. In 2000, Black wrote and recorded an album with Jo Almeida of Dogs D'Amour called Jo & Paul's Sonic Boom, Sun Down And Yellow Moon.

Two compilation albums featuring unreleased archive material of Black singing with L.A. Guns, Black City Breakdown (1985-1986) and Black List, as well as Sun Down And Yellow Moon from Jo & Paul's Sonic Boom, were released on his own label Black City Records.

From 2006 to 2008, he was the lead singer of Tracii Guns's L.A. Guns, a spinoff band that existed at the same time as Phil Lewis' L.A. Guns.

== Discography ==
=== With Jo Dog & Paul Black's Sonic Boom ===
- Sun Down And Yellow Moon (2000)
- Everybody Rains on My Parade (2022)

=== With L.A. Guns ===
- Black City Breakdown (1985–1986) (2000)
- Black List (2005)

=== The Joneses ===
- Keeping Up With... (1986)

=== The Mau Maus ===
- Scorched Earth Policies: Then and Now (2012)
