= Chris Holmes (guitarist) =

American guitarist

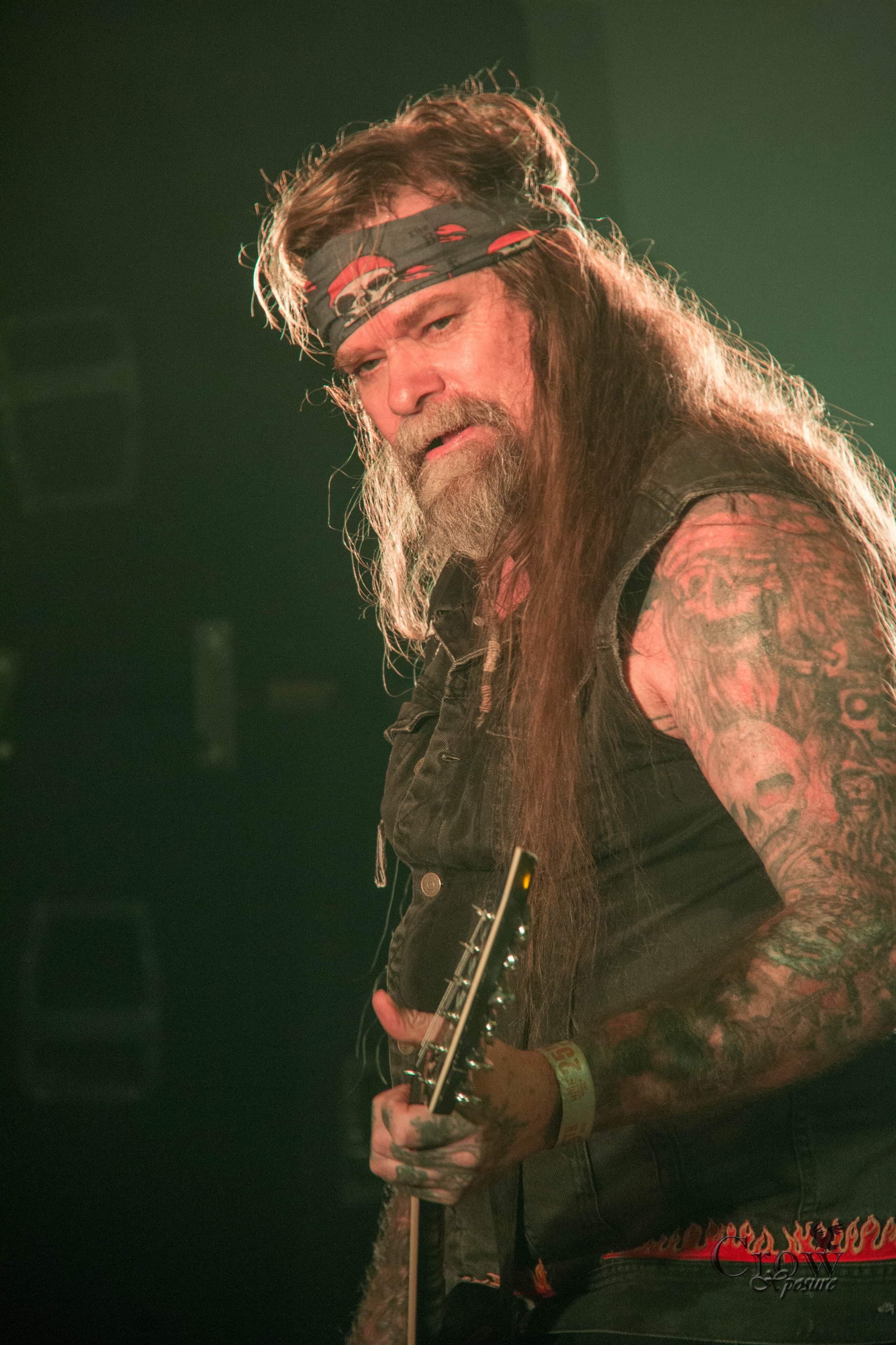
- Holmes in 2019

Background information
- Born: Christopher John Holmes; June 23, 1958 (age 68); Glendale, California, U.S.
- Genres: Heavy metal, glam metal
- Occupations: Musician, songwriter
- Instrument: Guitar
- Years active: 1978–present
- Formerly of: W.A.S.P.; Psycho Squad; Animal; Big Ball Stars; L.A. Guns; Where Angels Suffer; Stonebreed; Mean Man

Christopher John Holmes (born June 23, 1958) is an American heavy metal guitarist. He started his musical career in the Pasadena, California area in the late 1970s and early 1980s. He is best known as one of the lead guitarists of heavy metal band W.A.S.P. Holmes was a member of W.A.S.P. first from 1983 to 1990, and again from 1996 to 2001.

== Career ==
=== W.A.S.P. ===
Prior to meeting Blackie Lawless and Randy Piper, and joining W.A.S.P., Holmes played guitar with Los Angeles bands Buster Savage, LAX, and Slave. Holmes joined W.A.S.P. from 1983 to 1990, playing on the first four studio albums and the first live album. In 1996, Holmes rejoined W.A.S.P., and remained lead guitarist until 2001. Holmes has not played with W.A.S.P. since.

Between his stints in W.A.S.P., Holmes formed the band Psycho Squad, who recorded one demo called "Born, Work, Die" in 1991 with a line-up consisting of Holmes, singer Johnny Severe, ex-Against The Grain bassist Mike Kortz and ex-Citizen Kane drummer Chris Olson.

=== Randy Piper’s Animal ===
Holmes was contacted by friend and former bandmate Randy Piper to join Piper's new project, Animal. Holmes quickly relocated to Ohio to prepare for Animal's upcoming "900 lb Steam" tour. The tour was considered successful, and after its conclusion, Animal recorded tracks for a new album. Holmes was only a touring guitarist and did not play on the "Violent New Breed" album or any other Randy Piper's Animal release.

=== After Animal ===
After Holmes returned to Los Angeles in late 2003, he began working with several Southern California-based metal groups, producing and contributing guitar tracks. In 2005, Holmes contributed with the song "Anything but Down" for the soundtrack of Hot Wheels: AcceleRacers. In 2007, Holmes was involved in the filming of a Randy Rhoads documentary directed by Peter M. Margolis, which is yet to be released. Holmes appears briefly in a 2009 episode of VH1's Rock Docs, "Do It For The Band: The Women of Sunset Strip." In the Summer of 2009 Holmes released Secret Society's "Death by Misadventure."

=== Where Angels Suffer and solo career ===
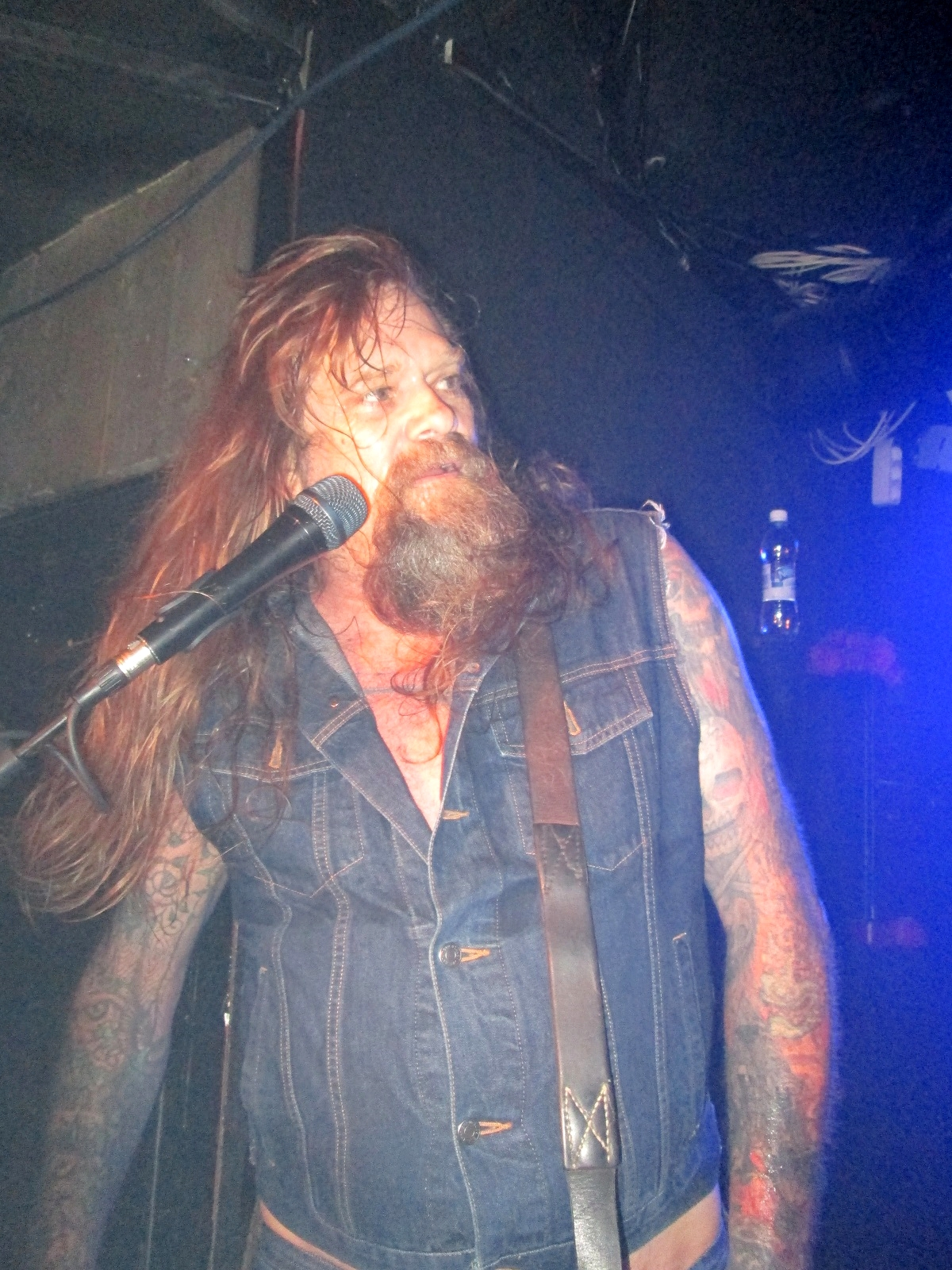
Holmes in Finland in 2014

In 2010, Holmes joined Where Angels Suffer with Randy Piper on guitar, Steve Unger (Metal Church) on bass, Rich Lewis (Animal), on vocals, and Stet Howland on drums (Blackfoot, Lita Ford, Killing Machine, Belladonna, Impellitteri, Sister and W.A.S.P.). Ira Black has since replaced Piper. The band toured Europe for the first time in 2011.

On November 26, 2012, Chris Holmes released his first solo album Nothing to Lose and decided to produce, manage and distribute it himself along with his wife Catherine Holmes. The album also featured classic era Motörhead drummer "Philthy Animal" Taylor. After his first album, Chris started recording his second solo album, Shitting Bricks. On May 2, 2015, that album was released worldwide and on the same day Holmes played his first concert in Nantes, France, with his new band Mean Man. Two of the songs were filmed live and uploaded to the band's official YouTube channel.

In September 2018, Holmes recorded the EP "Under the Influence" at Replug studio, mixed by Raphael Gary and produced by Chris and Catherine Holmes. It was released on the 2nd December 2018 in Dublin.

Since 2019 Holmes has introduced new members to Mean Man: vocalist Oliver Tindall, bassist Lex Gifford and drummer Stephen Jackson. In 2021, a feature-length documentary titled Mean Man: The Story of Chris Holmes, was released. The film details Holmes' current life while also telling the story of his rise to fame and dramatic fall due to substance abuse issues, ultimately leading to the loss of his W.A.S.P. publishing rights.

In early 2022, Holmes was diagnosed with throat and neck cancer, with future plans on hold due to treatment. In 2026, the musician was diagnosed with prostate cancer.

== Personal life ==
Chris Holmes has been married three times. His first marriage was to Kaylen Rodgers in 1985 and lasted until 1987. He dated Lita Ford from 1987 and was married to her from 1990 to 1992. He is now married to Catherine Holmes, whom he wed in August 2012.

In 2014, Chris Holmes and Catherine Holmes moved to Finland, but after living in Porvoo for a few months they moved to France where Catherine's parents lived, before moving back to Finland.

== Equipment ==
=== Guitars ===
- Jackson Custom Rhoads (Black with brass hardware). Used in the movie The Dungeonmaster. Returned after Chris was offered an endorsement from Jackson/Charvel.
- Jackson/Charvel Custom parts Star (Yellow, completely beaten-up).
- Jackson Custom Star (White with red blood splatter).
- Jackson Custom Rhoads (Black with white bevels, "I'm A Animal" painted in white on the back of the neck).
- Jackson Custom Rhoads (White pearl with black bevels, with "Fuck Off N Die" painted in red on the back of the neck. This guitar was later sent back to Jackson's custom shop after the wing broke to get the wing cut shorter, as well as the slimmer neck and zebra/lion graphic added). Sold on eBay, currently residing in Finland.
- Jackson Custom Star (Black with Harley Davidson graphic and yellow bevels). Sold on eBay.
- Fender Stratocaster (Red with white pickguard). seen once on a TV Show.
- Jackson Custom Star (Budweiser graphic and reverse Strathead-neck). Smashed by Lita Ford.
- Jackson Flying V (Natural).
- Jackson Custom Kelly (previously with Headless Children graphic, with "Touch Me And Die" painted in yellow on the back of the neck, now black and white with California Highway Patrol decal which Chris claims to have stolen from the door of a police car).
- Gibson Flying V (Black with white pickguard).
- Ibanez Destroyer (Black).
- Amfisound Custom (Pavement graphic).
- Ibanez Destroyer (Red). In an interview, Holmes said that this guitar was borrowed by Eddie Van Halen for the recording of the Women and Children First album. The guitar can be seen in the Neil Zlozower "Women and Children First" Sunset Sound studio photographs. Eddie had a similar Ibanez Destroyer that he modified after recording Van Halen into the Shark Destroyer. Eddie did not like the tone after the modification so he borrowed Chris Holmes's Ibanez Destroyer. Holmes' Red Ibanez Destroyer is distinctive because it was modified to have only a single volume control whereas usually there are two volume controls and one tone control. The Red Ibanez Destroyer is now in the possession of The Tone Zone's Doug Anderson as part of his collection of Van Halen memorabilia often referred to as "The Van Halen Museum".
