= Mick Cripps =

Australian musician

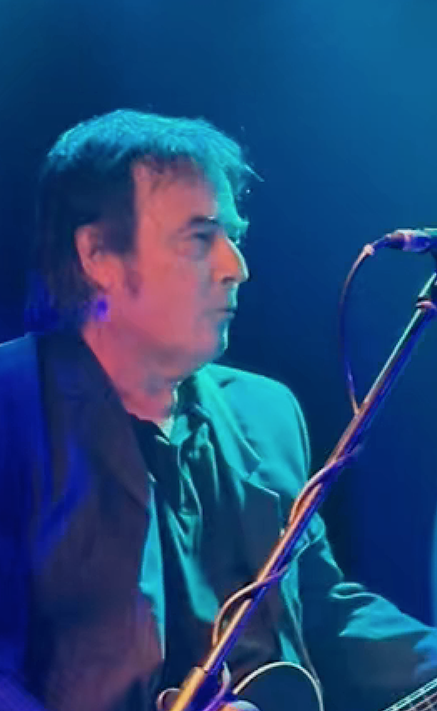
- Cripps in 2024

Background information
- Born: September 28, 1962 (age 64); Adelaide, Australia
- Genres: rock & roll, hard rock
- Occupation: Musician
- Instruments: Bass guitar, guitar, keyboards
- Years active: 1985-present

Michael Thomas Cripps (born September 28, 1962) is an Australian musician. His current musical project is The Long Shadows, previous bands include L.A. Guns, Burning Retna, Choir Boys, Mindphazer, The Brutalists, and several other groups.

== Career ==
=== L.A. Guns (1985–1995, 1999–2001) ===
Paul Black and Cripps formed Faster Pussycat (named after the movie Faster, Pussycat! Kill! Kill! and later the name of a separate band), in 1985. The group's lineup included Tracii Guns and Nickey Alexander. Shortly afterwards, the band (now with Rob Stoddard in the band too) reformed L.A. Guns.

With L.A. Guns, he was a part of the band's "classic" lineup (Phil Lewis, Guns, Kelly Nickels, Cripps and Steve Riley) and played guitar and keyboards, as well as songwriting duties. He performed and wrote on the albums L.A. Guns, Cocked & Loaded, Hollywood Vampires, Vicious Circle, and Man in the Moon. Cripps left the group in 1995, rejoining in 1999 for a reunion of the "classic" lineup, although his time in the band was short-lived, leaving by 2001.

According to L.A. Guns vocalist Phil Lewis, he was invited to participate in the recording of the band's 2012 album Hollywood Forever, but declined to participate.. However, Kelly Nickels has publicly stated that neither he nor Mick were ever asked to participate.

=== Burning Retna (1993–1996) ===
Burning Retna was an experimental band created by Cripps in 1993. The original lineup included Cripps, vocalist Chris Bradshaw, and drummer Nickey Alexander. Other members of the bands throughout the project included drummer Charlie Clouser, bassist Sean Beavan, and Kelly Nickels. The band did not release any material during its tenure, but a compilation album, "The Frozen Lies", was released in 2006.

=== The Brutalists (2017-present) ===
Cripps formed The Brutalists in 2017 alongside vocalist Nigel Mogg (formerly of The Quireboys), guitarist/vocalist Kent Holmes, bassist Robert Cripps and drummer Charlie Nice. They signed to Cleopatra Records in early 2018 and are working on their debut album. On May 11, 2018, the band announced their debut album will be released in August. It was released on August 31

== Personal life ==
When he was a young musician, he worked at Let It Rock, a boutique in LA. Cripps's son Ian works for Warner Music Group and was close friends with Anton Yelchin.

Cripps splits his time between London, England, San Francisco, California, and Los Angeles.
