= Kelly Nickels =

American bassist

- Also known as: Blade
- Born: French: Henri Perret; January 5, 1962 (age 64); Montauban, France
- Origin: New York City, U.S.
- Occupation: Bassist
- Years active: 1981–present
- Member of: Riley's L.A. Guns
- Formerly of: Faster Pussycat, L.A. Guns, Sweet Pain
- Children: 2
- Relatives: Pierre Perret (uncle); Emma Roberts (stepdaughter) Grace Nickels (daughter)

Kelly Nickels (French: Henri Perret; born January 5, 1962) is a French-born American bassist who has played in various bands including Sweet Pain, Faster Pussycat, and L.A. Guns.

== Career ==
=== Early years ===
Perret was born in Montauban, France, and moved to the United States when he was two; he lived in Atlanta, Georgia before moving to New York City.

He is the nephew of French popular music guitarist and composer Pierre Perret.

=== Faster Pussycat ===
Perret started as a roadie and light man for the band Hotshot, early incarnation of Danger Danger. He took on the pseudonym "Kelly Nickels".

In 1981, Nickels briefly joined metal band Virgin Steele.

After that he joined the band Sweet Pain in New York as a bassist, and released one album with them in 1985. Kelly and drummer Ronnie Taz quit Sweet Pain, and he was replaced by Victor Prestin.

Nickels moved on to the band Faster Pussycat, but was badly injured in a motorcycle accident (at an intersection on the Sunset Strip in Hollywood, California) in October 1986. Due to this injury, his position in the band was replaced. His left leg was broken in seven different places. He was in the hospital for 3 months and had 10 different surgeries. He had to walk with a cane for many years afterwards.

=== L.A. Guns ===
In mid-1987, he had joined L.A. Guns. Nickels remained with the group throughout their most commercially successful period. He also wrote the band's big hit "The Ballad of Jayne." In addition to playing bass throughout his tenure with the group, he also sang lead vocals on the L.A. Guns song "Nothing Better To Do," from their 1994 album, Vicious Circle. However, he left the band shortly after this album was released. By the end of the 1990s, he was back in L.A. Guns, only to leave again in 2000.

== Personal life ==
Nickels was involved with Kelly Cunningham, the mother of actress Emma Roberts. Nickels has a daughter (Grace Nickels) with Cunningham, born January 16th, 2001. He is currently married to Maria Nickels.

He is also the founder of the clothing line Montauk Salvage Company.

== Discography ==
=== Sweet Pain ===
- Sweet Pain (1985)

=== L.A. Guns ===
- L.A. Guns (1988)
- Cocked & Loaded (1989)
- Hollywood Vampires (1991)
- Cuts (1992)
- Vicious Circle (1994)
- Greatest Hits and Black Beauties (1999)
- Ultimate L.A. Guns (2002)
- Hollywood Forever (2012) (Track 11)

Riley's L.A. Guns

- Renegades (2020)
- The Dark Horse (2023)
