= Strapps =

British hard rock band

- Origin: London, England
- Genres: Rock, glam rock, hard rock
- Years active: 1975–1979
- Labels: EMI; Angel Air; Island
- Past members: Ross Stagg; Joe Read; Mick Underwood; Noel Scott; Ray McRiner

Strapps was a British hard rock group formed in 1975. The band was popular for the straightforward rock songs and for the raunchy visual image created by photographer Mick Rock. Strapps toured with Deep Purple and Ian Gillan Band, and have recorded four albums.

== Biography ==
Strapps came to being when drummer Mick Underwood met up with an Australian singer-guitarist Ross Stagg. The line-up was completed by bassist Joe Reed and keyboard player Noel Scott. The band went into a period of prolonged rehearsal before eventually being signed up to EMI's Harvest label, and subsequently recorded their first album at Ian Gillan's Kingsway Recorders studio in London, which was produced by Roger Glover. Glover also got the band a TV show performance at Supersonic, on 26 March 1977.

Strapps were soon out on the road touring the album. Unfortunately, the band's marketing strategy did not go down equally well with everyone - publicity photographs for their eponymous album with a topless model raised the ire of some radical feminists. The women subsequently fronted up at some of their university gigs and made things pretty uncomfortable for the band. Despite this minor blaze of negative publicity, they were given the support slot on labelmate Deep Purple's final tour in the UK and Japan, gaining invaluable exposure with their target audience.

The band soon hit the recording studios again, this time Island's Basing Street studios, and with producer Chris Kimsey at the helm. Secret Damage continued the already popular music formula. The cover photography for the album was still high gloss and somewhat glammy, but apart from one tiny image hidden on the inner sleeve, the subject matter consisted of less contentious material than their previous release, namely only the band members themselves.

In 1977, Strapps took the support slot on the UK tour of the Ian Gillan Band. The band's success on stage, especially in Japan, did not translate into sales. Unable to sell sufficient records to appease their record company, they were dropped from the roster. However, the Far East had not forgotten the band, and they were able to strike up a new, smaller deal for distribution in Japan only. A third album, Prisoner Of Your Love, was recorded at The Manor, with Pip Williams at the helm. For the fourth and what was ultimately to be the band's final album, Ball Of Fire, the sessions took place once again at Kingsway Recorders. By then Noel Scott has left the band and instead a second guitarist, Ray McRiner, was hired. Strapps folded when Mick Underwood accepted Ian Gillan's offer to join his new band Gillan in 1979.

In 2008, Angel Air Records released a live album titled Live at the Rainbow 1977, recorded at the Rainbow Theatre, London, during one show where Strapps opened for The Ian Gillan Band.

== Discography ==
=== Studio albums ===
- Strapps (1976)
- Secret Damage (1977)
- Prisoner of Your Love (1978)
- Ball of Fire (1979)

=== Live albums ===
- Live at the Rainbow 1977 (2008)

=== Singles ===
- "All Thru the Night" / "Understand It" (Promo only, Japan, 1977)
- "In Your Ear" / "Rita B" (Harvest, HAR 5108, 1976)
- "Child of the City" / "Soft Touch" (Harvest, HAR 5119, 1977)
- "Turn Out Alright" / "Take It, Break It" (Harvest, HAR 5163, 1978)

== Members ==
- Ross Stagg - lead vocals, guitar (1975–1979)
- Joe Read - bass (1975–1979) Joe later was a member of two American bands: the Textones and Code Blue.
- Mick Underwood - drums (1975–1979)
- Noel Scott - keyboards (1975–1978)
- Ray McRiner - rhythm guitar (1979)
