= Bolex Dementia =

Studio album by Hard Stuff
- Released: March 1973
- Recorded: London, 1973
- Genre: Hard rock
- Labels: Purple Records (original UK release); Mercury Records (original US release); Line Records (1983 German CD reissue); Red Fox Records (2003 French CD reissue); Second Harvest (2008 US CD reissue); Angel Air (2011 European CD remaster)
- Producer: Hard Stuff

Hard Stuff chronology
| Bulletproof (1972) | Bolex Dementia (1973) |

Alternative cover
- Cover of the US release

Bolex Dementia is the second and final album by the 1970s British rock band Hard Stuff.

During the recording of the album, two members of the band (John Cann and Paul Hammond), were injured in a serious car accident in Belgium. Cann had been sitting in the front passenger seat of their Ford Zodiac and suffered an injured back and broken ribs, while Hammond, who had been asleep in the back seat, broke both his legs. Cann spent a week in hospital in Ostend, and Hammond two months.

The band managed to finish recording Bolex Dementia, but Cann later stated, "When I listen to it, it sounds a little patchy and not how we intended it to be... It still has its good moments but it's a shame it all happened the way it did."

Hard Stuff split shortly after the release of the album, and the members went their separate ways. After declining to rejoin Atomic Rooster, Cann briefly joined Thin Lizzy before recording a solo album, The World's Not Big Enough. Gustafson joined Roxy Music and later the Ian Gillan Band, while Hammond continued to recover from his injuries before working with Cann on his solo album.

== Track listing ==
=== Side 1 ===
1. "Roll a Rocket" (John Cann) – 5:19
2. "Libel" (John Gustafson) – 3:58
3. "Ragman" (Gustafson) – 3:01
4. "Spider's Web" (Cann) – 4:55
5. "Get Lost" (Cann) – 3:01

=== Side 2 ===
1. "Sick n' Tired" (Cann) – 4:04
2. "Mermany" (Gustafson) – 5:58
3. "Jumpin' Thumpin' (Ain't That Somethin')" (Cann) – 2:55
4. "Dazzle Dizzy" (Gustafson) – 3:41
5. "Bolex Dementia" (Gustafson) – 3:41

=== CD bonus tracks ===
1. "Inside Your Life" (Gustafson) – 3:04
2. "(It's) How You Do It" (Cann) – 3:04

=== Notes ===
- The US pressing of the album reversed the sides, and some later CD releases reversed the track listing so that Side 2 came before Side 1, and "Sick 'n' Tired" was the opening track.
- Later releases showed John Cann's name as John Du Cann, as he later became known by this name.

== Personnel ==
- John Cann – guitar, cello, vocals
- John Gustafson – bass guitar, keyboards, vocals
- Paul Hammond – drums, percussion
- Engineer – Louie Austin
- Produced by Hard Stuff
- Mastering – Gilbert Kong
- Cover painting – István Sándorfi; US pressing – John Charles Youssi
- Photography – Fin Costello
- Art direction – Sheila Green
