= Episode Six (band) =

English band

- Also known as: Sheila Carter & Episode Six; The Sheila Carter Band
- Origin: Harrow, London, England
- Genres: Psychedelic pop; pop rock
- Years active: 1965–1974
- Labels: Pye; Decca
- Past members: Sheila Carter-Dimmock; Tony Lander; Graham Carter-Dimmock; Roger Glover; Harvey Shield; Andy Ross; Ian Gillan; John Kerrison; Mick Underwood; John Gustafson; Tony Dangerfield; Dave Lawson

Episode Six were an English rock band formed in Harrow, London in 1965. The band did not have commercial success in the UK, releasing nine singles that all failed to chart, but they did find minor success in Beirut at the time. Group members Ian Gillan and Roger Glover left in 1969 to join Deep Purple, while drummer Mick Underwood founded Quatermass and later collaborated with Gillan.

== Career ==
The band was formed in Hatch End, then in Middlesex, in July 1964 from two local bands, The Lightnings and the Madisons, who had all met at Harrow County School. The original line-up consisted of Glover on bass, Andy Ross on vocals, siblings Sheila Carter-Dimmock on keyboards and vocals and Graham Carter-Dimmock on guitar and vocals, with guitarist Tony Lander and drummer Harvey Shield. The band initially rehearsed at the Carter-Dimmocks' family house, and initial influences came from The Beach Boys, The Lovin' Spoonful and The Beatles.

By 1965, the band had signed a management deal with Gloria Bristow, a former employee of Helmut Gordon, original manager of what became The Who. In April of that year, the band were offered a short residency at the Arcadia Club in Frankfurt, Germany, playing from 7 pm to 3 am every night for a month, with only 15 minutes break every hour. Immediately on their return, Ross decided to get married and quit the music business, and consequently Bristow recommended Gillan as a replacement. Shortly afterwards, they signed a deal with the Dick Katz / Harold Davidson Ltd agency, though the band had difficulty finding regular work through this, feeling that the agency's attention was being diverted towards other bands. By the end of the year, however, they managed to land a deal with Pye Records. They were doing an average of 20 shows a month from July 1965 onwards and cut their first single, The Hollies' "Put Yourself in My Place" before the end of the year. It was released in early 1966.

The band were booked by Radio London to appear at one of their big open-air summer shows in May 1966 alongside David Bowie and issued more singles during the year, all of which failed to chart. In September 1966 the group played on the Dusty Springfield package tour and did a weekly residency at the Marquee Club during October. There was also the first solo single from Sheila; "I Will Warm Your Heart" in November 1966. Due to financial difficulties, and lack of chart success, the band were forced to do a long Christmas season in Beirut (where they had topped the local chart with a recording of Tim Rose's "Morning Dew") through December and January.

The group had by now built up an impressive repertoire of material and would vary their sets according to the audiences. They were also beginning to do sessions for the BBC. They did a mini tour of London parks (organised by the Greater London Council) in mid-June 1967, performing two 45-minute sets, and played for four weeks in Germany. On their return Shield left the group due to ill health, and was replaced by John Kerrison (born 1947), who had previously played in The Pirates with future Deep Purple member Nick Simper.

The group got a new record deal with MGM Records and shortened their name to The Episode, releasing "Little One" in May 1968 (their only single under the new name). They did three UK TV shows to promote this and recorded dozens of tracks for radio sessions over the year, including the new Radio 1 Club. They were not getting along with their new drummer, however, (Gillan subsequently referred to him as "a character and a half"), and he was eventually fired and replaced by ex-Outlaws drummer Mick Underwood.

The group left MGM and signed with Chapter One Records, releasing "Lucky Sunday" in September 1968, which became their eighth single to fail to chart in the UK. Gillan hated the brass section on the record. "Mozart Vs The Rest" followed in February 1969. This was issued in response to hundreds of calls to BBC Radio 1 after the band performed it on air. Sadly this happened too late for it to chart. They also contributed "Gentlemen of the Park" to the soundtrack of the 1968 short film Les Bicyclettes de Belsize.

The band decided they needed to update their musical style from the pop-rock they had been playing into a heavier sound, and made a start on a début album but it was never finished. In June 1969 Ritchie Blackmore and Jon Lord came to see Episode Six play live in London, and then offered Gillan a job in Deep Purple. Glover helped Deep Purple out on a studio session and was also asked to join them. The pair helped Episode Six fulfil existing bookings in the short term, and then quit following their first gig with Deep Purple at the Speakeasy on 10 July.

Episode Six carried on for a time with John Gustafson on bass and vocals. Sheila rehearsed with Pete Robinson, John Gustafson and Mick Underwood as a quartet, before they formed the trio Quatermass. Episode Six then played for a while with Sheila, Tony Lander, Dave Lawson (later of Greenslade) and Tony Dangerfield on bass. By the end of the year they were billed as Episode Six with Sheila Carter and then The Sheila Carter Band, and this continued off and on (mostly with gigs abroad) until 1974 with Sheila as the constant, before she went into session work.

A couple of singles recorded by Episode Six for Pye Records have been produced by Tony Reeves, a renowned bassist and one of founder members of Colosseum.

On 6 December 2015, for their 50th anniversary, the band reunited and performed in front of an audience of family and friends in London.

== Personnel ==
=== Members ===
- Sheila Carter-Dimmock – vocals, keyboards (1964–1974)
- Tony Lander – guitar (1964–1974)
- Graham Carter-Dimmock – vocals, guitar (1964–1969)
- Roger Glover – bass guitar (1964–1969)
- Harvey Shield – drums (1964–1967)
- Andy Ross – vocals (1964–1965)
- Ian Gillan – vocals (1965–1969)
- John Kerrison – drums (1967–1968)
- Mick Underwood – drums (1968–1972)
- John Gustafson – bass guitar, vocals (1969–1972)
- Tony Dangerfield – bass guitar (1972–1974)
- Dave Lawson – drums (1972–1974)

=== Lineups ===
1964–1965	1965–1967	1967–1968	1968–1969
Graham Carter-Dimmock – vocals, guitar; Sheila Carter-Dimmock – vocals, keyboards; Roger Glover – bass guitar; Tony Lander – guitar; Andy Ross – vocals; Harvey Shield – drums	Graham Carter-Dimmock – vocals, guitar; Sheila Carter-Dimmock – vocals, keyboards; Roger Glover – bass guitar; Tony Lander – guitar; Harvey Shield – drums; Ian Gillan – vocals	Graham Carter-Dimmock – vocals, guitar; Sheila Carter-Dimmock – vocals, keyboards; Roger Glover – bass guitar; Tony Lander – guitar; Ian Gillan – vocals; John Kerrison – drums	Graham Carter-Dimmock – vocals, guitar; Sheila Carter-Dimmock – vocals, keyboards; Roger Glover – bass guitar; Tony Lander – guitar; Ian Gillan – vocals; Mick Underwood – drums; Jamie Reynolds - triangle
1969–1972	1972–1974
Sheila Carter-Dimmock – vocals, keyboards; Tony Lander – guitar; Mick Underwood – drums; John Gustafson – bass guitar, vocals	Sheila Carter-Dimmock – vocals, keyboards; Tony Lander – guitar; Tony Dangerfield – bass guitar; Dave Lawson – drums

== Discography ==
=== Singles ===
- "Put Yourself in My Place" b/w "That's All I Want" (21 January 1966)
- "When I Hear Trumpets Blow" b/w "True Love Is Funny (That Way)" (29 April 1966)
- "Here, There and Everywhere" b/w "Mighty Morris Ten" (19 August 1966)
- "I Will Warm Your Heart" b/w "Incense" (4 November 1966) (as Sheila Carter & Episode Six)
- "Love-Hate-Revenge" b/w "Baby, Baby, Baby" (3 February 1967)
- "Morning Dew" b/w "Sunshine Girl" (9 June 1967)
- "I Can See Through You" b/w "When I Fall In Love" (6 October 1967)
- "Little One" b/w "Wide Smiles" (3 May 1968) (as Episode)
- "Lucky Sunday" b/w "Mr. Universe" (25 October 1968)
- "Mozart Versus The Rest" b/w "Jak D'Or" (14 February 1969)

=== Albums ===
- Put Yourself in My Place (1987)
- The Complete Episode Six: The Roots of Deep Purple (1991)
- The Radio 1 Club Sessions, Live 68/69 (1997)
- Cornflakes and Crazyfoam (2002)
- Love, Hate, Revenge (2005)

All of the above were compilation albums of songs recorded between 1965 and 1969
