= The Thrill of It All (song) =

Single by Roxy Music

from the album Country Life
- B-side: "Your Applications Failed"
- Released: November 1974
- Recorded: July–August 1974 at AIR Studios, London
- Genre: Art rock
- Length: 3:20 (Single version); 6:23 (Album version); 4:20 (Greatest Hits version)
- Label: Island, Polydor
- Songwriter: Bryan Ferry
- Producers: Roxy Music, John Punter

Roxy Music singles chronology
"All I Want Is You" (1974)	"The Thrill of It All" (1974)	"Love Is the Drug" (1975)

"The Thrill of It All" is a song by English rock band Roxy Music, released as a single only in the US in November 1974, taken from their 1974 album Country Life. The single was backed by the "All I Want Is You" B-side, an instrumental track called "Your Application's Failed", which is the only track to date written by drummer Paul Thompson. The track was re-released on The Thrill of It All boxset.

== Personnel ==
- Bryan Ferry – vocals, keyboards
- John Gustafson – bass
- John Wetton – bass on "Your Application's Failed"
- Edwin Jobson – strings, synthesiser, keyboards
- Andrew Mackay – oboe, saxophone
- Phil Manzanera – guitar
- Paul Thompson – drums
