= Naked Thunder =

Studio album by Ian Gillan
- Released: 16 July 1990
- Recorded: December 1989 – January 1990
- Studio: Amazon Studios, Liverpool; Crescent Woodcray Studio, Duncans, Jamaica; Olympic Studios, London
- Genre: Hard rock
- Length: 48:53
- Label: EastWest; Teldec
- Producer: Leif Mases

Ian Gillan chronology
| Accidentally on Purpose (with Roger Glover) (1988) | Naked Thunder (1990) | Toolbox (1991) |

Professional ratings
Review scores
| Source | Rating |
|---|---|
| AllMusic | 3/5 stars |
| Collector's Guide to Heavy Metal | 4/10 |
| The Encyclopedia of Popular Music | 3/5 stars |
| MusicHound Rock: The Essential Album Guide | 1/5 stars |
| Select | 2/5 |

Naked Thunder is the debut solo album by Ian Gillan, released soon after his departure from Deep Purple in 1989. It features a varied selection of songs, with one of Gillan's most passionate and impressive performances on power ballad "Loving on Borrowed Time" and traditional field lament "No More Cane on the Brazos". It was also the first album to feature Ian Gillan's long time writing partner Steve Morris. Naked Thunder was produced by Leif Mases and features a number of notable guest musicians, including drummer Simon Phillips and former Grease Band and SAHB keyboard player Tommy Eyre along with the Sensational Alex Harvey Band rhythm section of Chris Glen (bass) and Ted McKenna (drums).

The album was available only as an import in the USA until 1998 when it was re-released for American market by Eagle Records.

Naked Thunder was preceded by a couple of singles which failed to chart. More successful was the tour that followed with a video documenting one of the shows (Ian Gillan Live, 1990).

In 2006 Ian Gillan re-recorded "Loving on Borrowed Time" for the Gillan's Inn album. In November 2016, he again performed "No More Cane on the Brazos" live during the tour of Eastern Europe with orchestra and Don Airey Band. It was the first time he has performed the song in twenty-five years.

== Track listing ==
All songs written by Ian Gillan and Steve Morris except where noted

1. "Gut Reaction" – 3:46
2. "Talking to You" – 3:36
3. "No Good Luck" – 4:12
4. "Nothing But the Best" – 3:46
5. "Loving on Borrowed Time" – 5:04 (duet with Carol Kenyon)
6. "Sweet Lolita" – 3:50
7. "Nothing to Lose" 6:17
8. "Moonshine" (Gillan, Morris, Mark Buckle) – 2:46
9. "Long and Lonely Ride" – 3:48
10. "Love Gun" – 3:29
11. "No More Cane on the Brazos" (Traditional) – 8:13

B-sides and outtakes

1. "Rock n' Roll Girls" – 3:20
2. "Hole in My Vest" – 3:42

== Personnel ==
Musicians

- Ian Gillan – vocals, harmonica
- Steve Morris – guitar, bass, keyboards
- Albie Donnelly – saxophone
- Tommy Eyre – synthesisers, Hammond organ
- Roger Glover – bass
- Simon Phillips – drums
- J. Peter Robinson – synthesisers, piano
- John Gustafson, Carol Kenyon, Dave Lloyd, Harry Shaw – backing vocals
- The A-Team Horns – brass

Production

- Leif Mases – producer
- Keith Andrews – engineer
- Al Stone – mixing

== Singles/EPs ==
- "Nothing but the Best / Hole in My Vest"
- "Nothing but the Best / Hole in My Vest / Moonshine"
- "No More Cane on the Brazos / Long and Lonely Ride"
- "No Good Luck / Love Gun"
- "No Good Luck / Love Gun / Rock N' Roll Girls"

== Charts ==
| Year | Chart | Position |
|---|---|---|
| 1990 | Swedish Albums Chart | 27 |
| 1990 | UK Albums Chart | 63 |
