= Quatermass (band) =

English progressive rock band

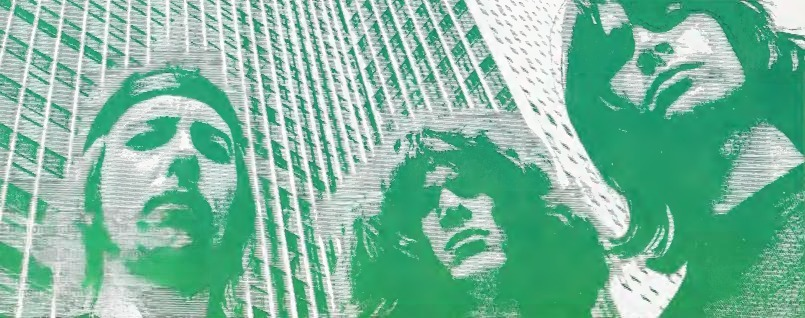
- The band in 1970; Left to right: Mick Underwood, J. Peter Robinson, John Gustafson

Background information
- Also known as: Quatermass II (1994–1999)
- Origin: London, England
- Genres: Progressive rock
- Years active: 1969–71 (as Quatermass); 1994–99 (as Quatermass II)
- Label: Harvest Records
- Past members: Mick Underwood; John Gustafson; J. Peter Robinson; Nick Simper; Peter Taylor; Bernie Tormé; Don Airey; Gary Davis; Bart Foley

Quatermass were an English progressive rock band from London, active between 1969 and 1971. A related band, Quatermass II, was active in the mid-1990s.

== Career ==
The trio consisted of bass player and vocalist John Gustafson, keyboardist J. Peter Robinson and Mick Underwood on drums. Underwood had previously played with Ritchie Blackmore in the Outlaws, while Gustafson had been a member of Cass and the Casanovas, the Big Three, the Seniors, and the Merseybeats. Underwood later became drummer with Episode Six, and was joined by Gustafson after Roger Glover and Ian Gillan left to join Deep Purple. The band took its name from Professor Bernard Quatermass, a fictional scientist who had been the hero of three science fiction serials produced by BBC Television in the 1950s, and were signed to Harvest Records.

The group formed as a power trio, with the Hammond organ as the main instrument. Their first and only album sold itself through "...compactness, wealth of ideas, forceful lead vocals and complicated arrangements, enriched by pianist Robinson's tasteful use of classical strings, which are on display along with spacious keyboard passages at their height in the mold of the Nice." One track, "Laughin' Tackle", includes 16 violins, 6 violas, 6 cellos, and 3 double basses, arranged by Robinson, and a drum solo by Underwood. Underwood remained in close contact with Blackmore, and visited Deep Purple in the studio while they were recording In Rock.

The group split in early 1971. Gustafson formed a new band, Hard Stuff (Bullet) with ex-members of Atomic Rooster.

The band's song "Black Sheep of the Family", a cover of Fat Mattress, was the first track to be recorded by Rainbow, having been rejected for the Deep Purple album Stormbringer.

Quatermass II

In 1994, Underwood, and founding Deep Purple member Nick Simper joined in a project titled Quatermass II. Gustafson contributed two songs on their album, Long Road (1997), which also involved Gary Davis and Bart Foley on guitars, with Don Airey on keyboards.

== Band members ==
=== Quatermass ===
- Mick Underwood – drums, percussion (1969–1971; died 2024)
- John Gustafson – bass, lead vocals (1969–1971; died 2014)
- J. Peter Robinson – keyboards (1969–1971)

=== Quatermass II ===
- Mick Underwood – drums, percussion (1994–1999)
- Nick Simper – bass (1994–1999)
- Peter Taylor – lead vocals (1994)
- Bernie Tormé – guitars (1994; died 2019)
- Don Airey – keyboards (1994–1999)
- Gary Davis – lead guitars (1994–1999)
- Bart Foley – rhythm guitars, lead vocals (1994–1999)
- Rob Sas - guitars (1998-1999)

== Discography ==
=== Albums ===
- Quatermass (1970)
- Quatermass II: Long Road (1997)

=== Singles ===
- "Black Sheep of the Family" / "Good Lord Knows" (1970)
- "One Blind Mice" / "Punting" (1971)
- "Gemini" / "Black Sheep of the Family" (1971)
