= The Big Three (English band) =

English Merseybeat group

- Origin: Liverpool, England
- Genres: Beat, rhythm and blues, pop, rock and roll
- Years active: 1961–1966, 1973
- Labels: Decca, Polydor
- Past members: Johnny Hutchinson; Johnny Gustafson; Brian Griffiths (for extended lineups, see below)

The Big Three were a Merseybeat musical group from Liverpool, England. They are best known for their 1963 recording of "Some Other Guy", their live EP The Big Three at the Cavern from the same year, and for being direct contemporaries of the Beatles.

== Career ==
The Big Three evolved from a group called Cass and the Cassanovas, formed in May 1959 by Brian Cassar as a trio comprising Cassar (rhythm guitar, lead vocals), Adrian Barber (lead guitar, vocals), and Brian J. Hudson (drums). The original line-up played at St George's Hall, Liverpool, on Friday, 15 May 1959. Johnny Hutchinson replaced Hudson in July 1959. In need of a bass guitarist, Hutchinson brought in Johnny Gustafson in December. At that time, Gustafson did not have a proper bass guitar, so Barber converted an acoustic for him. Gustafson's first gig was at The Tower Ballroom, New Brighton, on 31 December 1959.

In May 1960, the band auditioned for Larry Parnes at the Wyvern Social Club, Seel Street, Liverpool, with a number of other bands including The Silver Beetles (one of The Beatles' earlier names). Hutchinson sat in with the Silver Beetles when their drummer Tommy Moore failed to turn up. In December 1960, Cassar left the group and moved to London, reducing them to a trio again, and the band re-emerged in January 1961 as The Big Three. Despite being a three-piece they were known as "one of the loudest, most aggressive and visually appealing acts".

Brian Epstein signed them to his agency and sent them over to Hamburg's Star-Club. During that trip in July 1962 Brian Griffiths joined the group, and the best-known line-up of the Big Three - Griffiths, Gustafson and Hutchinson - was established. Barber later emigrated to the United States, where he became known as an in-house recording engineer and producer at Atlantic Records, where he produced the Allman Brothers Band's debut album in 1969.

Epstein arranged for them to audition for Decca Records, for which they recorded "Some Other Guy", a standard in the Merseybeat scene, which became a minor chart hit.

The Big Three and Epstein terminated their partnership in July 1963. Gustafson and Griffiths quit in November 1963, and with drummer Ian Broad from Rory Storm and the Hurricanes formed the Seniors and left for Germany. Hutchinson replaced them with Faron Ruffley and Paddy Chambers from Faron's Flamingos. Gustafson would go on to be a member of The Merseybeats, Quatermass, Roxy Music and The Ian Gillan Band.

Chambers left in March 1964 and was replaced by Paul Pilnick from Lee Curtis' Allstars. Pilnick only stayed a short time before moving on to Tony Jackson & The Vibrations in October 1964, with Ruffley leaving around the same time.

Various musicians passed through the band after Pilnick left, including bass players John Bradley, Adrian Lord (ex-Mojos), and Mike Bankes, while Ray Marshall and Howie Casey played saxophone on a trip to Germany. Barry Womersley was guitarist for a while, but was replaced by a returning Brian Griffiths during the time that they were managed by Chris Wharton. Wharton had hopes of re-enlisting Johnny Gustafson, but this came to nothing. Hutchinson had played with the Spidermen, but re-formed the group with Barry Womersley and Ray Marshall.

Between 1964 and 1966, the line-up consisted of John Hutchinson, Ray Marshall (vocals, bass) and Barry Womersley (lead guitar). During 1966 the band folded. Hutchinson received an offer to join Kingsize Taylor & the Dominoes but he declined, and retired from music.

Arty Davies of 'Liverpool Beat' says that following the demise of the Womersley/Marshall/Hutchinson line-up, a couple of bookings featured the following: Dave Blackstone (lead guitar), Johnny Hutchinson (drums) and Pete Mumford (bass guitar). There is an apocryphal story in Alan Clayson's book Beat Merchants that Hutchinson packed up his drums after a first set at the Blue Angel, collected his pay and went home, with another drummer taking his place. Presumably this was the band's last gig.

In 1973, Gustafson and Griffiths teamed up with Elton John drummer Nigel Olsson and Quatermass keyboardist J. Peter Robinson for a reunion album, Resurrection, released on Polydor Records. In 1999 Griffiths got together with another former Big Three member, Faron Ruffley, to do a small spot of Big Three numbers at the Merseycats charity night; the drummer for the get-together was Arty Davies (Faron's Flamingos).

In 2009, RPM Records issued the CD Cavern Stomp, which compiled the Big Three's entire recorded output.

In 2017 Bill Kenwright released and toured the sell-out musical Cilla The Musical, about Cilla Black; The Big Three (played by Jay Osborne, Chris Weeks and Tom Dunlea) appeared in the show and doubled as the show band. Following the tour the three players were 'handed down the baton' to become the next generation of The Big Three by original members Griffiths, Gustafson, and Hutchinson. The new Big Three were set to write and release new material in early 2020.

John Gustafson died on 12 September 2014. Johnny Hutchinson died on 12 April 2019.

== Members ==
- Johnny Hutchinson – drums, vocals (1961–1966)
- Johnny Gustafson – bass guitar, vocals (1961–1963, 1973)
- Adrian Barber – lead guitar, vocals (1961–1962)
- Brian Griffiths – guitar (1962–1963, 1973, 1999)
- Faron Ruffley – bass guitar (1963–1964, 1999)
- Paddy Chambers – guitar, vocals (1963–1964)
- Paul Pilnick – guitar, vocals (1964)
- Ray Marshall – bass guitar, vocals (1964–1966)
- Barry Womersley (known professionally as Barry Walmsley) – lead guitar (1964–1966)
- Nigel Olsson – drums (1973)

Related musicians

- Cilla Black and Beryl Marsden were backed by the Big Three
- J. Peter Robinson – piano (1973 Resurrection album recordings)
- Arty Davies – drums (1999 one-off gig)

Timeline

== Discography ==
=== Singles ===
- "Some Other Guy" (Leiber, Stoller, Barrett) / "Let True Love Begin" (Decca F 11614, 29 March 1963, UK No. 37)
- "By the Way" / "Cavern Stomp" (Decca F 11689, 28 June 1963, UK No. 22)
- "I'm With You" / "Peanut Butter" (Decca F 11752, 11 October 1963)
- "If You Ever Change Your Mind" / "You've Got to Keep Her under Your Hand" (Decca F 11927, 12 June 1964)
- "Some Other Guy" / "Let It Rock" / "If You Gotta Make a Fool of Somebody" (Polydor 2058 343, 16 March 1973)

=== EPs ===
- At the Cavern (live) ("What'd I Say" / "Don't Start Running Away" / "Zip A Dee Doo Dah" / "Reelin' and Rockin'") (Decca DFE 8552, 22 November 1963, UK No. 6)

=== Albums ===
- Resurrection (Polydor 2383199, March 1973)

=== Compilation albums ===
- Cavern Stomp (Edsel ED 111, 1982)
- Cavern Stomp (The Complete Recordings) (RPM Retrodisc Retro 862, 2009)
