= Bulletproof (Hard Stuff album) =

- Clockwise from bottom left – Gustafson, Hammond, Cann

Studio album by Hard Stuff
- Released: June 1972
- Recorded: London, August–September 1971
- Genre: Hard rock; proto-metal
- Label: Purple Records (UK); Harvest Records (Venezuela); Red Fox Records (2002 European CD reissue); Angel Air Records (2011 European CD remaster)
- Producer: Hard Stuff

Hard Stuff chronology
Bulletproof (1972)	Bolex Dementia (1973)

Professional ratings
Review scores
Source	Rating
Allmusic	3.5/5 stars

Bulletproof is the first album by the 1970s British rock band Hard Stuff. It was released on Purple Records, the Deep Purple-related record label.

It also featured vocalist Harry Shaw, formerly of Curiosity Shoppe (who recorded one single on Dream), but he had left the band by the time of its release and was uncredited. The record sleeve was re-designed to remove Shaw's image (originally shown on the bottom right hand side).

== Track listing ==
1. "Jay Time" (John Cann) – 2:50
2. "Sinister Minister" (John Gustafson) – 3:30
3. "No Witch at All" (Gustafson) – 5:38
4. "Taken Alive" (Gustafson) – 3:14
5. "Time Gambler (Rodney)" (Cann) – 6:11
6. "Millionaire" (Cann) – 6:04
7. "Monster in Paradise" (Gustafson, Ian Gillan, Roger Glover) – 4:33
8. "Hobo" (Cann) – 3:25
9. "Mr. Longevity – RIP" (Gustafson) – 4:35
10. "The Provider – Part One" (Cann) – 2:31

=== Bonus tracks (2011 Angel Air issue) ===
11. "Jay Time" (single version) (Cann) – 2:36
12. "The Orchestrator" (Cann, Gustafson) – 3:17
- Later releases showed John Cann's name as John Du Cann, as he later became known by this name.

== Cover version ==
The opening track "Jay Time" was covered in 2011 by American rock band White Denim.

"Monster in Paradise" was also recorded by co-writer Ian Gillan and released on his Cherkazoo album.

== Personnel ==
- John Cann – guitar, cello, vocals on tracks 1, 8 & 11
- John Gustafson – bass guitar, keyboards, vocals on tracks 2, 4, 7, 9 & 12
- Paul Hammond – drums, percussion
- Harry Shaw – vocals (uncredited) on tracks 3, 5, 6 & 10
- Tony Burrett – cover photo
- Louie Austin – engineer
