= Clear air turbulence (disambiguation) =

Clear-air turbulence is the erratic movement of air masses in the absence of any visual cues.

Clear Air Turbulence may also refer to:

- Clear Air Turbulence (album), an album by the Ian Gillan Band
- Clear Air Turbulence, a fictional space ship in the science fiction novel Consider Phlebas
