= The Javelins =

English rock band

The Javelins, sometimes also known as Ian Gillan & the Javelins, is a 1960s band fronted by singer Ian Gillan, later of Deep Purple. The other members included rhythm guitarist Tony Tacon, bass player Tony Whitfield, drummer Keith Roach and lead guitarist Gordon Fairminer. All members were based in the Hayes and Heston area of West London.

The Javelins' only album came when the band reunited in 1994, to record an LP of rock and roll covers. The result was the album Sole Agency and Representation. It was released in September 1994 by RPM Records.

The album was re-issued in 2000 by Purple Records.

In 2018 The Javelins reformed with the original members including Ian Gillan on lead vocals, and made a new album full of rock and roll covers from the 1950s/1960s era. It was released on 31 August 2018 in various formats.
