= Mark Nauseef =

American drummer

- Born: 11 June 1953 (age 73); Cortland, New York; United States
- Genres: Rock, jazz, world
- Occupation: Musician
- Instruments: Drums, percussion, vocals
- Years active: 1971–present

Mark Nauseef (born June 11, 1953) is an American drummer and percussionist who has enjoyed a varied career, ranging from rock music during the 1970s with his time as a member of the Ian Gillan Band and, temporarily with Thin Lizzy when Brian Downey was unable to travel because of health problems, to a wide range of musical styles in more recent times, playing with notable musicians from around the world.

== Career ==
Nauseef briefly toured the United Kingdom in 1972 as tour member of The Velvet Underground before joining Elf, fronted by Ronnie James Dio, in early 1975, but the group disbanded shortly afterwards. Accompanied by Elf keyboardist Mickey Lee Soule, Nauseef joined ex-Deep Purple singer Ian Gillan in his new jazz fusion group, simply named the Ian Gillan Band. After three albums, Gillan broke the group up in 1978. Nauseef stood in for Thin Lizzy drummer Brian Downey for two international tours, and then joined Gary Moore's short-lived band G-Force.

During the 1980s, Nauseef moved away from rock music towards a range of styles, including Javanese and Balinese gamelan, as well as music of Indian and Ghanaian origin. He has released several solo albums and worked with other musicians in a variety of projects.

Artists with whom Nauseef has performed or recorded include Joachim Kühn, Gary Moore, Jack Bruce, Bill Laswell, Glenn Hughes, Rabih Abou-Khalil, Trilok Gurtu, Steve Swallow, L. Shankar, Hamza El Din, The Velvet Underground, Joëlle Léandre, Ikue Mori, Ronnie James Dio, Markus Stockhausen, Kyai Kunbul (Javanese gamelan), Andy Summers, Tony Oxley, Tomasz Stanko, Kenny Wheeler, Edward Vesala's "Sound and Fury", Thelma Houston, David Torn, The Ladzekpo Brothers (Ghanaian music and dance), Charlie Mariano, The Gamelan Orchestra of Saba (Balinese gamelan), Kudsi Erguner, Philip Lynott, George Lewis, Evan Parker and Lou Harrison. Throughout most of these projects Nauseef has collaborated with Walter Quintus.

Nauseef attended the California Institute of the Arts where he studied Javanese gamelan with K.R.T. Wasitodiningrat, Balinese gamelan with I Nyoman Wenten, North Indian Pakhawaj drumming with Pandit Taranath Rao, North Indian music theory with Pandit Amiya Dasgupta, Ghanaian drumming and dance with Kobla and Alfred Ladzekpo, Dzidzorgbe Lawluvi and C.K. Ganyo, and 20th Century Western percussion techniques and hand drumming with John Bergamo. He also studied frame drum techniques of the Middle East, India and the Caucasus with Glen Velez. It was also at CalArts that Nauseef began a very creative and productive relationship, which continues to this day, with musical "alter ego", guitarist Miroslav Tadic. Together, they have composed, recorded and produced various styles of music in settings ranging from duo to large ensembles with musicians from around the world.

Nauseef has also worked as a producer. In addition to his own recordings, he has produced many records of various types of music including modern experimental forms as well as traditional forms. Traditional music productions include numerous recordings of traditional Balinese and Javanese music, including the award-winning "The Music of K.R.T. Wasitodiningrat" which was recorded in Java and features Wasitodiningrat's compositions. Other examples include the Balinese ensemble recordings "Gamelan Batel Wayang Ramayana" and "Gender Wayang Pemarwan" which were recorded in Bali. These and other recordings of Indonesian music were produced for the CMP 3000 "World Series" with the production team of Kurt Renker And Walter Quintus. The "Worlds Series", which Nauseef was instrumental in establishing, was founded by CMP owner and producer Kurt Renker and produces recordings from a variety of non-western countries including India, Turkey, Korea, Indonesia and others.

== Discography ==
Jack Bruce

- A Question of Time with Allan Holdsworth, Tony Williams, Ginger Baker, Albert Collins, Nicky Hopkins, Zakir Hussain, a.o., 1989
- Somethin Els with Dave Liebman, Eric Clapton, Trilok Gurtu, Clem Clempson, a.o., 1993
- The Jack Bruce Collector's Edition with Gary Moore, Ginger Baker, Eric Clapton, a.o., 1996
- Can You Follow?, Jack Bruce with John McLaughlin, Tony Williams, Frank Zappa, Cream, John Mayall, Chris Spedding, a.o., 2008

The Velvet Underground

- Disc 3 of Final V.U. 1971-1973, 2001

Elf

- Trying to Burn the Sun, 1975

Ian Gillan Band

- Child in Time, 1976
- Clear Air Turbulence, 1977
- Scarabus, 1977
- Live at the Budokan, 1978

Thin Lizzy

- The Boys Are Back in Town: Live in Australia, 1978

Gary Moore's G-Force

- G-Force, 1980 with Tony Newton, Willie Dee

Philip Lynott

- Solo in Soho, 1980 with Gary Moore, Mark Knopfler, a.o.
- The Philip Lynott Album, 1982 with Mark Knopfler, Mel Collins, Pierre Moerlen, a.o.

Solo and others

- Nightline New York, Joachim Kühn with Michael Brecker, Billy Hart, Bob Mintzer, Eddie Gómez, 1981
- Information, with Joachim Kühn and George Kochbeck, 1981
- Personal Note, with Joachim Kühn, Trilok Gurtu, Jan Akkerman, Detlev Beier, 1982
- Sura, with Joachim Kühn, Markus Stockhausen, Trilok Gurtu, Detlev Beier and David Torn, 1983
- I'm Not Dreaming, Joachim Kühn with Ottomar Borwitzky, Rolf Kühn, Herbert Försch, George Lewis, 1983
- Wun Wun, with Jack Bruce and Trilok Gurtu, 1985
- Dark, 1986
- Dark: Tamna Voda, with L. Shankar and David Torn, 1989
- Let's Be Generous, 1993
- Bracha, with Miroslav Tadić, David Philipson and John Bergamo, 1989
- Let's Be Generous, with Miroslav Tadić, Joachim Kühn, and Tony Newton, 1991
- Keys To Talk By, with Dušan Bogdanović and Miroslav Tadić, 1992
- The Snake Music, Miroslav Tadić, Jack Bruce, Markus Stockhausen, David Torn, Wolfgang Puschnig and Walter Quintus, 1994
- The Sultan's Picnic Rabih Abou-Khalil with Steve Swallow, Kenny Wheeler, Charlie Mariano, Milton Cardona, Nabil Khaiat, Howard Levy, Michel Godard, 1984
- Old Country, with Miroslav Tadić and Howard Levy, 1996
- Baby Universe, Jadranka Stojaković with Miroslav Tadic, Yasuhiro Kobayashi, Jumpei Sakuma, Yoshiko Sakata, Michel Godard, Howard Levy, 1996
- Still Light, with Miroslav Tadić and Markus Stockhausen, 1997
- Loose Wires, with Miroslav Tadić and Michel Godard, 1997
- Odd Times, Rabih Abou-Khalil with Howard Levy, Nabil Khaiat, Michel Godard
- OCRE with Sylvie Courvoisier, Pierre Charial, Michel Godard and Tony Overwater, 1996
- Birds Of A Feather with Sylvie Courvoisier, 1997
- Ottomania, with Kudsi Erguner, 1999
- Sarabande, Jon Lord, with Andy Summers, Paul Karass, Pete York, The Philharmonia Hungarica, Eberhard Schoener, LP 1976, CD 1999
- With Space in Mind, Solo 2000
- Venus Square Mars, with David Philipson and Hamza El Din, 2000
- Islam Blues, Kudsi Erguner with Nguyen Le and Renaud Garcia-Fons, 2001
- Gazing Point, with Kudsi Erguner and Markus Stockhausen, 2002
- Evident, with Joëlle Léandre, 2004
- Snakish, with Wadada Leo Smith, Miroslav Tadić, Walter Quintus, Katya Quintus, 2005
- Albert, with Ikue Mori, Walter Quintus and Sylvie Courvoisier, 2006
- At The Le Mans Jazz Festival, Joëlle Léandre with Maggie Nicols, Irene Schweizer, William Parker, India Cooke, Markus Stockhausen, Paul Lovens, Sebi Tramontana, Carlos Zingaro, 2006
- No Matter, with Bill Laswell, Markus Stockhausen and Kudsi Erguner, 2008
- Orte, Raymond Theler with Walter Quintus and Marcio Doctor, 2008
- Air, Dave Liebman with Marcio Doctor, Walter Quintus, Markus Stockhausen, a.o., 2011
- Aspiration, with Alice Coltrane, Carlos Santana, Kudsi Erguner, Zakir Hussain, Pharoah Sanders, a.o., 2011
- City Of Leaves, Sussan Deyhim with Bill Laswell, Kudsi Erguner, a.o., 2011
- Near Nadir, with Ikue Mori, Evan Parker and Bill Laswell, 2011
- Spaces & Spheres, with Stefano Scodanibbio, Tara Bouman, Fabrizio Ottaviucci, Markus Stockhausen, 2013
- as the wind, with Evan Parker, Toma Gouband, 2016
- All In All In All, with Arthur Jarvinen, Tony Oxley, Pat Thomas, Sylvie Courvoisier, Walter Quintus, Bill Laswell, Miroslav Tadić, 2018
- Locked Hybrids, Matthew Wright with Evan Parker, Toma Gouband, 2020
- Warszawa 2019, Evan Parker’s ElectroAcoustic Ensemble, 2020
- La Convivencia: Hommage To Flory Jagoda, with Merima Ključo, Jelena Milušić, Miroslav Tadić and Yvette Holzwarth, 2022
- Mongrels, with Tony Buck, 2023
- Etching The Ether, Trance Map+, with Evan Parker, Matt Wright and Peter Evans, 2023

== Bibliography ==
Arcana V: Musicians on Music, Magic & Mysticism, Hips Road: New York (ISBN 0978833791), Edited by John Zorn with writings by Meredith Monk, Fred Frith, Terry Riley, Pauline Oliveros, Alvin Curran, Gavin Bryars, a.o., 2010

The Drum and Percussion Cookbook: Creative Recipes for Players and Teachers, Meredith Music / Hal Leonard (ISBN 1574631012), Edited by Rick Mattingly with writings by Peter Erskine, Bill Bruford, Valerie Dee Naranjo, Anthony Cirone, Robin Engelman, Bill Cahn, She-e Wu, John Beck, Glenn Kotche, a.o., 2008

Shamanism and Tantra in the Himalayas, Inner Traditions (ISBN 0892819138) by Claudia Müller-Ebeling, Christian Rätsch and Surendra Bahadur Shahi, 2002

Practicing and Making Music...Without Your Instrument, Published in The Percussive Arts Society journal PERCUSSIVE NOTES (Oct. 1992)

Music Practice as Meditation, Published in The Percussive Arts Society journal PERCUSSIVE NOTES (Feb. 2007)

== Filmography ==
- Kibyoshi, Ikue Mori with Makigami Koichi, DVD 2011
- Unlimited 23, with Ikue Mori, Sylvie Courvoisier, Kazuhisa Uchihashi, Makigami Koichi, Lotte Anker, Maja Ratkje, Zeena Parkins, David Watson, Peter Evans, a.o., DVD 2011
- The Haunting of Julia (original title Full Circle), with Mia Farrow, Keir Dullea and Tom Conti. Music composed by Colin Towns. LP 1977 CD 1995
- Live At The Rainbow Theatre, London 1977, The Ian Gillan Band. VHS and DVD
