= Scarabus =

Studio album by Ian Gillan Band
- Released: 7 October 1977
- Recorded: July – August 1977
- Studio: Kingsway Recorders, London
- Genre: Jazz fusion; progressive rock
- Length: 41:20
- Label: Island
- Producer: Ian Gillan Band

Ian Gillan Band chronology
Clear Air Turbulence (1977)	Scarabus (1977)	Live at the Budokan (1978)

Alternative cover
- Cover of the 1989 release

Professional ratings
Review scores
Source	Rating
AllMusic	1.5/5 stars

Scarabus is the third and the last studio album by British jazz rock band Ian Gillan Band, released in October 1977.

The album was reissued in 1982 by Virgin Records in the height of popularity of Ian Gillan's group Gillan (a CD edition followed in 1989). The CD reissue included an extra track, "My Baby Loves Me". This track, recorded live at the Budokan Hall, Tokyo, Japan, on 22 September 1977, was originally part of the double LP set Live at the Budokan, and had been omitted from the UK release in error.

Ian Gillan re-used the vocal melody of the title track "Scarabus" on the song "Disturbing the Priest" six years later, on the album Born Again (1983) during his short tenure with the British hard rock/heavy metal band Black Sabbath. The guitar riff on "Mercury High" is the same as the one played by guitarist Ray Fenwick on "Back USA" from his 1971 solo album Keep America Beautiful, Get a Haircut.

== Cover ==
The "witch" on the US cover comes from an adaptation of the movie poster for the 1976 horror film The Witch Who Came from the Sea, which itself was based on an older Frank Frazetta painting.

== Track listing ==
All tracks written by Ian Gillan, John Gustafson, Ray Fenwick, Colin Towns and Mark Nauseef.

Side one

1. "Scarabus" – 4:53
2. "Twin Exhausted" – 4:08
3. "Poor Boy Hero" – 3:08
4. "Mercury High" – 3:31
5. "Pre-release" – 4:22

Side two

1. "Slags to Bitches" – 5:09
2. "Apathy" – 4:19
3. "Mad Elaine" – 4:15
4. "Country Lights" – 3:16
5. "Fool's Mate" – 4:19

== Personnel ==
- Ian Gillan – vocals
- Ray Fenwick – guitars and vocals
- John Gustafson – bass guitar and vocals
- Colin Towns – keyboards and vocals
- Mark Nauseef – drums and percussion

Production

- Produced by Ian Gillan Band
- Recorded and mixed at Kingsway Recorders, London, July–August 1977
- Recording engineer – Paul Watkins
- Assistant engineers – Bob Broglia, Mark Perry
