= Child in Time (album) =

Studio album by Ian Gillan Band
- Released: July 1976
- Recorded: Musicland Studios, Munich, December 1975 – January 1976, mixed at Mountain Studio, Montreux, February 1976
- Genre: Jazz fusion
- Length: 36:04
- Label: Polydor / Oyster
- Producer: Roger Glover

Ian Gillan Band chronology
Child in Time (1976)	Clear Air Turbulence (1977)

Singles from Child in Time
- 1. "You Make Me Feel So Good" Released: July 1976 (EU); 2. "Down the Road" Released: November 1976 (US/Japan)

Professional ratings
Review scores
Source	Rating
AllMusic	4/5 stars

Child in Time is the debut album by British jazz rock band Ian Gillan Band, released in 1976. The album took its title from the Deep Purple song "Child in Time", a version of which appears on the LP. The album reached No. 36 on Swedish charts and No. 55 in UK.

This was Ian Gillan's first release after leaving Deep Purple, and former Deep Purple bassist Roger Glover is the album's producer.

== Track listing ==
Side one

1. "Lay Me Down" (Ian Gillan, Ray Fenwick, Mark Nauseef, John Gustafson) – 2:55
2. "You Make Me Feel So Good" (Gillan, Mike Moran, Dave Wintour, Bernie Holland, Andy Steele) – 3:41
3. "Shame" (Gillan, Fenwick, Nauseef, Gustafson) – 2:47
4. "My Baby Loves Me" (Gillan, Fenwick, Nauseef, Roger Glover) – 3:35
5. "Down the Road" (Gillan, Fenwick, Nauseef, Gustafson, Glover) – 3:27

Side two

1. "Child in Time" (Ritchie Blackmore, Gillan, Glover, Jon Lord, Ian Paice) – 7:23
2. "Let It Slide" (Gillan, Fenwick, Nauseef, Gustafson, Moran) – 11:41

== Personnel ==
=== Ian Gillan Band ===
- Ian Gillan – vocals and harmonica
- Mike Moran – Fender Rhodes, Hohner Clavinet, Hammond organ, ARP 2600, acoustic and electric piano, ARP String Ensemble
- Ray Fenwick – electric, acoustic and slide guitars, vocals
- John Gustafson – bass guitar, vocals
- Mark Nauseef – drums, percussion

=== Additional musicians ===
- Roger Glover – ARP 2600 synthesizers, kalimba, vocals

== Charts ==
Chart (1976)	Peak position
Swedish Albums (Sverigetopplistan)	36
UK Albums (OCC)	55
