= At the Cavern =

Live album by The Big Three
- Released: 1963
- Recorded: 1963
- Venue: The Cavern Club (Liverpool, England)
- Genre: Beat
- Length: 10:00
- Label: Decca
- Producer: Noel Walker

The Big Three chronology
At the Cavern (1963)	Resurrection (1973)

At the Cavern is a live extended play 45 rpm record released in 1963 by The Big Three. It was released on Decca Records as DFE 8552 in mono and reached #6 in the UK EP charts in December 1963.

The liner notes are by Bob Wooler, the DJ at The Cavern Club in Liverpool where this live recording was recorded.

== Track listing ==
Side one
No.	Title	Writer	Length
1.	"What'd I Say"	Ray Charles	3:42
2.	"Don’t Start Running Away"	Johnny Hutchinson; John Gustafson; Brian Griffiths	1:43
Total length:			5:25

Side two
No.	Title	Writer	Length
1.	"Zip-A-Dee-Doo-Dah"	Allie Wrubel; Ray Gilbert	2:31
2.	"Reelin' and Rockin'"	Chuck Berry	2:04
Total length:			4:35

== Personnel ==
- Johnny Hutchinson – drums
- Johnny Gustafson – bass guitar
- Brian Griffiths – electric guitar
- Noel Walker – producer
- Terry Johnson – recording engineer
