= Forcefield (band) =

British hard rock band (1987–1992)

- Origin: United Kingdom
- Genres: Hard rock
- Years active: 1987–1992
- Label: President
- Past members: Cozy Powell (drums); Ray Fenwick (guitars); Mo Foster (bass); Graham Bonnet (vocals)

Forcefield was a late 1980s hard rock band focused on drummer Cozy Powell and guitarist Ray Fenwick. The band gave them the opportunity to play many covers including tracks from Jimi Hendrix, Cream, The Kinks and Deep Purple. Many other renowned musicians appeared as guests or were members of the band, including Tony Martin, Don Airey, Jan Akkerman, Laurence Cottle, Neil Murray, and Barry St John.

They released four albums for President Records and one album of instrumental tracks, taken from the four albums plus previously unreleased tracks.

== Album discography ==
Forcefield

1. "Set Me Free"
2. "Best Shot"
3. "Runaway"
4. "Sunshine Of Your Love"
5. "Shine It On Me"
6. "Whole Lotta Love"
7. "Black Cat"
8. "White Room"
9. "You Really Got Me"
10. "Fire In The City"
11. "Keep On Running"
12. "Smoke On The Water"

Forcefield II – The Talisman

1. "The Talisman"
2. "Year Of The Dragon"
3. "Tired Of Waiting For You"
4. "Heartache"
5. "Good Is Good"
6. "Carrie"
7. "Without Your Love"
8. "I Lose Again"
9. "The Mercenary"
10. "Black Night / Strange Kind Of Woman"
11. "I Lose Again (Instrumental Version)"

Forcefield III – To Oz and Back

1. "Hit And Run"
2. "Always"
3. "Stay Away"
4. "Desire"
5. "Tokyo"
6. "Who'll Be The Next In Line"
7. "Wings On My Feet"
8. "Firepower"
9. "Hold On"
10. "Rendezvous"

Forcefield IV – Let The Wild Run Free

1. "Let The Wild Run Free"
2. "Can't Get Enough Of Your Love"
3. "Money Talks"
4. "I Will Not Go Quietly"
5. "Women On Wings"
6. "Ball Of Confusion"
7. "Living By Numbers"
8. "The Wind Cries Mary"
9. "In A Perfect World"

Instrumentals (compilation/out-takes)

1. "Tokyo"
2. "The Talisman"
3. "Perfect World"
4. "I Lose Again"
5. "Secret Waters"
6. "Look Don't Touch"
7. "Three Card Shuffle"
8. "Rendezvous"
9. "Osaka"
