= Fancy (band) =

British pop group (1973–1975)

- Origin: England
- Genres: Pop
- Years active: 1973–1975
- Labels: Atlantic (Australia, Germany, Japan, Netherlands, UK); Arista (UK); Big Tree (USA); RCA Victor (USA); Angel Air (reissues - UK); Collectables (reissues - USA)
- Past members: Helen Caunt; Annie Kavanagh; Ray Fenwick; Mo Foster; Les Binks

Fancy were an early-mid-1970s pop group. The band was made up of session musicians produced by Mike Hurst. They had a surprise US hit single in 1974 with a version of the classic "Wild Thing", peaking at #14 on the Billboard Hot 100, #9 in Canada, and #31 in Australia. They also had a second US hit with "Touch Me", peaking at #19, #58 in Canada, and #97 in Australia. They were initially fronted by Penthouse Pet Helen Caunt and later Annie Kavanagh. Ray Fenwick, formerly of The Spencer Davis Group, joined Fancy in 1974. Fancy's song "Feel Good" from the album Wild Thing has been sampled over one hundred times, most notably by the Beastie Boys on the song "3-Minute Rule" off their album Paul's Boutique (1989). Les Binks, later of Judas Priest, played drums on Fancy's releases.

== Album discography ==
Wild Thing

1. "Wild Thing"
2. "Love for Sale"
3. "Move On"
4. "I Don't Need Your Love"
5. "One Night"
6. "Touch Me"
7. "U.S. Surprise"
8. "Between the Devil and Me"
9. "I'm a Woman"
10. "Feel Good"

Turns You On (UK release title: Something to Remember)

1. "She's Riding the Rock Machine"
2. "I Was Made to Love Him"
3. "You've Been in Love Too Long"
4. "Something to Remember"
5. "Everybody's Cryin' Mercy"
6. "The Tour Song"
7. "Stop"

Both albums were re-released on a single CD, circa 2002, on the UK-based Angel Air record label. Turns You On was expanded with additional tracks and B-sides for this release.

A U.S. CD release of Wild Thing came out on the Collectables reissue label in 2006.
