= Toolbox (album) =

Studio album by Ian Gillan
- Released: 14 October 1991
- Recorded: 1991
- Studio: Battery Studios, London
- Genre: Hard rock
- Length: 43:10
- Label: East West
- Producer: Chris Tsangarides

Ian Gillan chronology
Naked Thunder (1990)	Toolbox (1991)	Dreamcatcher (1997)

Professional ratings
Review scores
Source	Rating
AllMusic	3/5 stars
Collector's Guide to Heavy Metal	6/10

Toolbox is the second solo album by Ian Gillan originally released only in Europe, Japan and Brazil on the German label EastWest. It was his last album before his second comeback with Deep Purple in August 1992. The subsequent 10-month tour, which crossed Europe and South America, proved Gillan to be a strong live attraction. Although Toolbox was not a big commercial success, it is considered by many as one of Gillan's finest records. The album was released in the US in 1998 by Eagle Records.

== Track listing ==
All tracks are written by Ian Gillan and Steve Morris unless otherwise noted

No.	Title	Writer(s)	Length
1.	"Hang Me Out to Dry"	Ian Gillan, Leslie West	4:03
2.	"Toolbox"		4:15
3.	"Dirty Dog"		4:07
4.	"Candy Horizon"		4:17
5.	"Don't Hold Me Back"		4:37
6.	"Pictures of Hell"		3:56
7.	"Dancing Nylon Shirt (Part 1)"		3:39
8.	"Bed of Nails"		4:25
9.	"Gassed Up"		3:05
10.	"Everything I Need"		3:50
11.	"Dancing Nylon Shirt (Part 2)"		3:02

== Personnel ==
- Ian Gillan – lead vocals
- Steve Morris – guitar
- Brett Bloomfield – bass guitar
- Leonard Haze – drums

Guest musicians

- Leslie West – guitar on "Hang Me Out To Dry"

== Production notes ==
- Recorded at Battery Studios, London, 1991
- Produced, engineered and mixed by Chris Tsangarides.
