= One Eye to Morocco =

Studio album by Ian Gillan
- Released: 6 March 2009
- Recorded: March–June 2008
- Studio: Metalworks Studios, Mississauga, Ontario
- Genre: Blues rock
- Length: 40:00
- Label: Edel
- Producer: Nick Blagona

Ian Gillan chronology
Live in Anaheim (2008)	One Eye to Morocco (2009)

Professional ratings
Review scores
Source	Rating
AllMusic	3.5/5 stars
Jukebox:Metal	3/5 stars
Rockpages	(positive)

One Eye to Morocco is the fifth solo studio album by English Deep Purple vocalist Ian Gillan. The album material was written during the gap of Deep Purple's 2008 world tour, in the US. It was released on 6 March 2009 on Edel Records as CD, Limited Edition CD and Vinyl.

== Background ==
As Gillan himself tells, he was in the Jewish-quarter of Kraków listening to the related stories of Oskar Schindler when the voice faded – and then returned and somebody told him: 'Ah, Ian you have one eye to Morocco.' – It was Tomasz Dziubiński. Ian didn't understand the meaning of this Polish idiom, until he was told the whole idiom: "To have one eye to Morocco and another to Caucasus". The idiom describes a cross-eyed, or wandering eye person. This idiom inspired Gillan to make another solo album, and the title for the album was set to "One Eye to Morocco."

== Recording ==
In spring 2008 there was a gap between Purple's World Tour, as bassist Roger Glover's mother had died, so Gillan returned to Buffalo to do something new. In a short period of time, with his former bandmate Steve Morris, Ian wrote more than thirty songs. The recording of the album took place in Metalworks Studios, Mississauga, Ontario. Twelve songs were chosen for the album and all of them were recorded in just three days. Recording was mixed and engineered by Nick Blagona, who has previously worked with Deep Purple and mixed Purple's reunion album Perfect Strangers, as well as The House of Blue Light and Slaves & Masters. Also guitarist Michael Lee Jackson contributed to the album.

== Music style ==
Ian Gillan said himself:

"It was a conscious decision to avoid the use of a rock rhythm section and you will notice the complete absence of guitar and keyboard solos – we get the very best of all that from Deep Purple. So the instrumentation is perhaps more seductive than thrusting."

== Track listing ==
1. "One Eye to Morocco" (Gillan, Morris) – 4:05
2. "No Lotion for That" (Gillan, Morris) – 3:11
3. "Don't Stop" (Gillan, Appleby) – 2:35
4. "Change My Ways" (Gillan) – 3:26
5. "Girl Goes to Show" (Gillan, Morris) – 3:59
6. "Better Days" (Jackson) – 4:07
7. "Deal with It" (Gillan, Morris) – 3:44
8. "Ultimate Groove" (Jackson) – 3:48
9. "The Sky Is Falling Down" (Gillan, Morris) – 4:09
10. "Texas State of Mind" (Jackson) – 3:49
11. "It Would Be Nice" (Gillan, Morris) – 3:10
12. "Always the Traveller" (Gillan, Morris) – 3:17
13. "Lonely Days" (bonus track)
14. "She Thinks It's a Crime" (bonus track)

=== Singles ===
- "One Eye to Morocco / Better Days" (For promotional use only)

== Formats ==
One Eye To Morocco was released as CD, Vinyl LP and Limited Edition CD+Vinyl (Doppel CD).

== Band ==
- Ian Gillan – lead and backing vocals, harmonica
- Michael Lee Jackson – guitars
- Rodney Appleby – bass
- Howard Wilson – drums
- Steve Morris – guitars
- Joe Mennonna – saxophones
- Lance Anderson – Hammond organ
- Jesse O'Brien – keyboards
- Brownman Ali – flugelhorn
- Jaro Jarosil – cello
- The Gillanaires – backing vocals

== Production ==
- Produced, engineered, mixed and mastered by Nick Blagona –
- Executive producers: Michael Lee Jackson, Drew Thompson
- Basic tracks recorded at Metalworks Studios, Mississauga, Ontario, Canada
- Additional recordings at Psychotropic Studios, Dundas, Ontario, Canada
- Rehearsal at the Town Ballroom, Buffalo, New York
- Calligraphy: Katarina Dorch
- Photo: Bob Mussell
- Artwork: Patrizio Squeglia

== Chart performance ==
Year	Chart	Position
2009	Belgium	93
2009	Germany	97
