= Dreamcatcher (Ian Gillan album) =

Studio album by Ian Gillan
- Released: September 1997
- Studio: Ocean Reach Studio, Warrington and Parr St. Studios, Liverpool
- Genre: Rock
- Length: 49:35
- Label: Toshiba EMI (Japan); Ark 21 (Europe); Forbidden (US)
- Producer: Ian Gillan, Steve Morris

Ian Gillan chronology
Toolbox (1991)	Dreamcatcher (1997)	Gillan's Inn (2006)

Professional ratings
Review scores
Source	Rating
AllMusic	2.5/5 stars
Collector's Guide to Heavy Metal	6/10

Dreamcatcher is the third studio album by Ian Gillan, released in September 1997 in Japan, October 1997 in the United Kingdom and in May 1998 in the US. All songs were performed by Ian Gillan accompanied by Steve Morris. The album was being worked on between 1995 and 1997.

There are three different versions of the album. The basic European edition consists of twelve tracks. The US edition was remixed by Bob Katz, the order of the songs was changed and it has a different cover. The Japanese edition includes of two extra tracks.

Dreamcatcher is considered the most obscure album in Gillan's career. It features mostly acoustic songs, closer to folk and blues traditions than to rock, the genre for which Gillan is mainly known. It received little media attention and generally had rather disappointing reviews.

== Track listings ==
No.	Title	Writer(s)	Length
1.	"Chandra's Coriander"	Ian Gillan, Steve Morris	5:24
2.	"Prima Donna"	Gillan	3:59
3.	"All in My Mind"	Gillan, Morris	4:15
4.	"That's Why God Is Singing the Blues"	David Corbett	3:33
5.	"Gunga Din"	Gillan	2:50
6.	"Hard on You"	Brett Bloomfield, Gillan, Leonard Haze, Dean Howard	4:45
7.	"Sleepy Warm"	Gillan	3:56
8.	"Country Mile"	Gillan, Morris	3:47
9.	"You Sold My Love for a Song"	Gillan, Morris	4:04
10.	"A Day Late and a Dollar Short"	Bloomfield, Gillan, Haze, Howard	4:26
11.	"Sugar Plum"	Bloomfield, Gillan, Haze, Howard	4:54
12.	"Anyway You Want Me (That's How I Will Be)"	Aaron Schroeder, Cliff Owens	3:42

Japanese edition bonus tracks
No.	Title	Writer(s)	Length
13.	"High Ground"	Bloomfield, Gillan, Haze, Howard	4:40
14.	"Sleepy Warm" (alternative version)	Gillan	4:08
Total length:			58:23

=== US edition ===
1. "Hard on You" – 4:45
2. "You Sold My Love for a Song" – 4:04
3. "Sugar Plum" – 4:54
4. "A Day Late and a Dollar Short" – 4:26
5. "Chandra's Coriander" – 5:24
6. "All in My Mind" – 4:15
7. "Prima Donna" – 3:59
8. "Sleepy Warm" – 3:56
9. "Country Mile" – 3:47
10. "That's Why God Is Singing the Blues" – 3:33
11. "Gunga Din" – 2:50
12. "Anyway You Want Me" – 3:42

== Personnel ==
Personnel taken from Dreamcatcher liner notes.

- Ian Gillan – vocals, producer
- Steve Morris – guitars, accompaniment, producer
- Ken Nelson – engineer, mixer

== Production notes ==
- Produced by Ian Gillan and Steve Morris
- Mixed by Ken Nelson at Parr St. Studios, Liverpool
- Recorded at Ocean Reach Studio, Warrington, and Parr St. Studios, Liverpool
- US version remixed and mastered by Bob Katz at Digital Domain, Longwood, Florida
