= Live at the Budokan (Ian Gillan Band album) =

Live album by Ian Gillan Band
- Released: March 1978 (Japan); August 1983 (UK)
- Recorded: 22 September 1977
- Venue: Budokan Hall, Tokyo, Japan
- Genre: Jazz-rock fusion
- Label: Eastworld, Virgin
- Producer: Ian Gillan Band

Ian Gillan Band chronology
Scarabus (1977)	Live at the Budokan (1978)

Live at the Budokan is a live album by the Ian Gillan Band, recorded live on 22 September 1977 in Tokyo, Japan. Originally it was released only in Japan, in March 1978 by EastWorld Records, being Live at the Budokan (EWS-81112) and Live at the Budokan Vol. 2 (EWS81113). Each was a single LP in a gatefold sleeve. Several songs from the set did not make it to the albums, as evidenced by audience tapes.

In August 1983 it was re-issued as a double-album in the UK by Virgin Records, titled Live at the Budokan Volumes I & II (VGD3507), housed in a single LP sleeve. In Australia, it would also be released as a double-album in 1983 (Interfusion L45837). This had a gatefold sleeve, with different artwork to the UK release.

The first CD edition, in 1989, had a banner on the front reading 'The complete double set', yet dropped "My Baby Loves Me" and reordered some tracks. The 2007 remaster restored "My Baby Loves Me", but still finished with a different running order to the original vinyl release.

== Track listing ==
All songs written by Ian Gillan, Ray Fenwick, John Gustafson, Colin Towns and Mark Nauseef except where stated. Timings for the LPs are taken from the disc-labels of the UK vinyl release.

=== LP Volume 1 (1978) ===
Side one

1. "Clear Air Turbulence" – 12.56
2. "My Baby Loves Me" (Gillan, Fenwick, Gustafson, Nauseef) – 9.50

Side two

1. "Scarabus" – 5.32
2. "Money Lender" – 10.56
3. "Twin Exhausted" – 5.08

=== LP Volume 2 (1978) ===
Side One

1. "Over the Hill" – 8.41
2. "Child in Time" (Ritchie Blackmore, Gillan, Roger Glover, Jon Lord, Ian Paice) – 10.20

Side Two

1. "Smoke on the Water" (Blackmore, Gillan, Glover, Lord, Paice) – 9.50
2. "Mercury High" – 5.06
3. "Woman from Tokyo" (Blackmore, Gillan, Glover, Lord, Paice) – 4.46

=== CD reissue (1989) ===
1. "Clear Air Turbulence" – 12.49
2. "Scarabus" – 5.25
3. "Money Lender" – 10.53
4. "Twin Exhausted" – 5.05
5. "Over the Hill" – 8.35
6. "Mercury High" – 4.58
7. "Smoke on the Water" – 9.46
8. "Child in Time" – 10.16
9. "Woman from Tokyo" – 4.47

=== CD reissue (2007) ===
1. "Clear Air Turbulence" – 12.07
2. "My Baby Loves Me" (Gillan, Fenwick, Nauseef, Glover) – 8.01
3. "Scarabus" – 4.54
4. "Money Lender" – 10.52
5. "Twin Exhausted" – 4.37
6. "Over the Hill" – 8.30
7. "Mercury High" – 4.50
8. "Child in Time" – 9.58
9. "Smoke on the Water" – 9.47
10. "Woman from Tokyo" – 4.15

== Personnel ==
- Ian Gillan – vocals
- Ray Fenwick – guitar, vocals
- John Gustafson – bass guitar, vocals
- Colin Towns – keyboards, vocals
- Mark Nauseef – drums, percussion

== Production notes ==
- Produced by Ian Gillan Band
- Recorded live at the Budokan Hall, Tokyo, Japan on 22 September 1977 with the Tacamo Recording Mobile
- Engineered by Kenji Murata assisted by Hitoshi Matsubara
- Mixed by Paul 'Chas' Watkins at Kingsway Recorders Ltd, London, UK
- Mastered by Yoshiaki Hirasawa at Toshiba EMI, Tokyo
