= Edel SE & Co. KGaA =

German independent record company

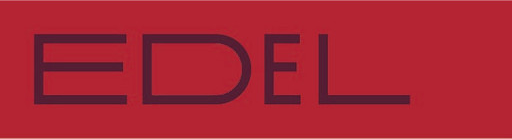
- Type: Privately held company
- Industry: Music, entertainment, publishing
- Genre: Pop music, rock, classical, entertainment for children, books
- Founded: 1986; 40 years ago
- Founder: Michael Haentjes
- Headquarters: Hamburg, Germany
- Area served: Worldwide
- Key people: Jonas Haentjes (CEO)
- Products: CD, vinyl, DVD & Blu-ray, book
- Revenue: ▲€214 million (2019/2020)
- Number of employees: 1,030
- Divisions: optimal media GmbH; Kontor Records; Kontor New Media earMUSIC; Edel Germany GmbH
- Website: edel.com

Edel SE & Co. KGaA is a German independent media company based in Hamburg. As a label and publishing group, it also operates marketing and sales for artists and smaller music labels. The repertoire of the Edel labels includes dance, rock and pop music to classical music and a children's catalogue. In addition to the development and marketing of music, the group also deals with the production, logistics and distribution of CDs, DVDs, vinyl records, and books at the production site of the subsidiary optimal media GmbH in Röbel/Müritz as well as with services in the online and book business.

== History ==
Edel was founded in 1986 by the current chairman of the board of directors and the majority shareholder Michael Haentjes as a one-man company under the name edel Gesellschaft für Produktmarketing mbH and initially dealt exclusively with mail order for film music. In 1992, the company name was changed to edel Company Music GmbH. In April 1993 Edel purchased the East German VEB Deutsche Schallplatten's classical music recording catalog of 2,000 recordings. Specifically, Edel's Berlin Classics imprint has carried the output of VEB's classical Eterna label. Edel grew steadily and recorded sales of more than 150 million Deutsche Mark in 1995. In 1998, under the new company name edel music AG, the IPO (WKN 564950) and the listing on the Neuer Markt followed. The first stock market listing was 101 DM. The IPO brought the company a gross capital inflow of almost 60 DM million. As part of a global strategy, investments were acquired abroad, for example the PIAS Group in Belgium, which also included Connected Music Vertrieb GmbH, founded by Haentjes in 1997, and Eagle Rock, London. In 2000, more than 1 billion DM in consolidated sales was achieved.

In July 1999, Edel purchased an 80% stake in RED Distribution from Sony Music Entertainment.

In connection with the general crisis in the music business, the collapse of the Neuer Markt and the high costs of integrating the additional companies, a crisis followed in 2001, which jeopardised the company's continued existence. In 2002, Edel and Roland Berger Strategy Consultants implemented an extensive corporate restructuring program. Parts of the company and shareholdings were repelled and loss-making companies were closed.

Of more than 1,700 employees, about 750 remained in the company. Thanks to this consolidation and the stable business of the manufacturer's subsidiary, positive business figures were again achieved. At the end of the short financial year 2001 (30.09.) Edel changed from listing in the Neuer Markt to the Regulated Market / General Standard of the Frankfurt Stock Exchange, which was transferred to the Regulated Market in 2007.

In February 2007, edel music AG took over the book division of Pabel-Moewig with cookbooks, guides, puzzle books, children's books and some licenses such as the silver volumes of the science fiction series Perry Rhodan, thus expanding its media division.

At the Annual General Meeting in May 2007 it was decided to remove the addition "music" in the company name. The company then operated under the name edel AG until 2010. In December 2009, the listing on the Regulated Market was revoked. The stock has since been traded on the Frankfurt Stock Exchange.

In 2010, Edel took over 75% of the then ZS publishing house, followed by the remaining 25% in October 2014.

In January 2011, the spelling of the company name changed to Edel AG.

In March 2011, Edel AG finally acquired the evaluation rights for the TV and cinema films around the cartoon characters Pettersson and Findus from the insolvent TV-Loonland AG.

In October 2012, Edel AG acquired 100% of the shares in Brilliant Classics B.V., which is one of the leading companies in the field of classical music. The label, based in Leeuwarden, Netherlands, sells its products through a worldwide network of distributors.

In July 2014, Edel acquired the catalogue of Jazz label MPS Records from Universal Music Group.

Since October 2015, Edel holds 75% of Pandastorm Pictures GmbH.

In March 2016, Jonas Haentjes, the son of the company's founder, took over the position of Director Corporate Development at Edel.

As of December 2017, Michael Haentjes and Jonas Haentjes jointly led Edel AG as co-CEOs, and Jonas Haentjes was appointed to the board of management of Edel AG.

Joerg Pfuhl, Charles Caldas and Joel Weinstein are members of the Edel supervisory board.

In April 2018, the executive board and supervisory board of Edel AG decided to convert the company into a limited partnership for shares (KGaA).

The change of form is intended to ensure the influence of the family after a generational succession. In addition, the general partner of KGaA should be given the legal form of a European Company (SE).

In March 2019, the generational transition was completed and the change of legal form to SE & Co. KGaA was completed. Jonas Haentjes has been the sole CEO ever since.

== Business divisions and participations ==
Sources: Business units and shares

100%: Edel Music & Entertainment GmbH with the divisions earMUSIC, Edel Motion, Edel Kids, Edel Kultur, Edel Distribution.

100%: optimal media GmbH with the areas of production and distribution of sound and data media, production and distribution of books. to

66.8%: Kontor Records GmbH, dance label with the brands Kontor Top of the Clubs and Kontor House of House.

100%: Kontor New Media GmbH with the areas Mobile Entertainment, Internet and Digital Distribution.

100%: Edel Verlagsgruppe GmbH, Publishing Group.

Furthermore, Edel holds 100% of the shares of Pandastorm Pictures GmbH and 100% of the Dutch Brilliant Classics B.V.

== earMUSIC ==
=== Overview ===
earMUSIC
- Industry: Music, entertainment, publishing
- Genre: Rock, pop, metal and alternative rock
- Headquarters: Germany
- Area served: Worldwide
- Key people: Max Vaccaro (General Manager), Jonas Haentjes (CEO)
- Products: CD, vinyl, DVD & Blu-ray, book
- Website: www.ear-music.net

earMUSIC is a European international record company based in Hamburg, Germany mainly dedicated to rock, pop, metal and alternative rock artists. The label's first release was Ian Gillan's album One Eye to Morocco in 2009. The label is a division of Edel Music & Entertainment GmbH.

=== Roster (earMUSIC) ===
- Albert Hammond
- Alice Cooper
- Annihilator
- Babymetal
- Blackmore's Night
- Bonnie Tyler
- Foreigner
- Deep Purple
- New Model Army
- Marillion
- Status Quo
- Gamma Ray
- Joe Jackson
- H.E.A.T
- Helmet
- MC5
- Hollywood Vampires
- Joe Satriani
- Last in Line
- Michael Schenker Group
- Myrath
- Once Human
- Savatage
- Sinsaenum
- The The
- The Damned
- Skid Row
- Stratovarius
- Tarja Turunen

=== Past roster (earMUSIC) ===
- Andre Matos
- Anette Olzon
- Angra
- Dagoba
- Dee Snider
- Def Leppard
- DragonForce
- Kamelot
- KMFDM
- Loudness
- Rainbow
- Sebastian Bach
- Sepultura
- Unisonic
- Van Canto
- Vision Divine
