= Bullet (American band) =

American rock band

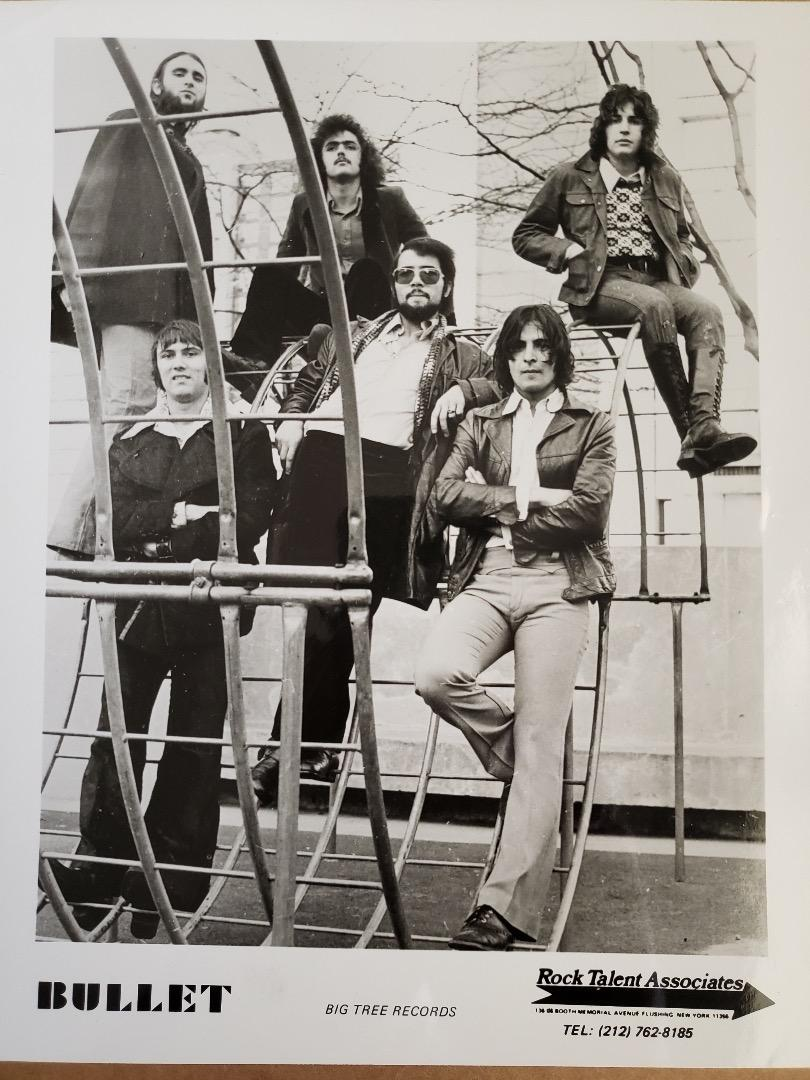
- Promotional photo for Bullet taken in Central Park in 1971

Background information
- Origin: New York City, U.S.
- Genres: Rock
- Years active: 1971–1972
- Labels: Big Tree Records
- Past members: Ernie Sorrentino; Paul Granato; Mike Micara; Roget Pontbriand; George Ruiz; Joey Stann

Bullet was a one-hit wonder American rock band. Their only hit, "White Lies, Blue Eyes", peaked at number 28 on the Billboard Hot 100 chart in January 1972.

== History ==
=== Sudden success ===
According to vocalist Ernie Sorrentino, he was asked to provide a lead vocal for the Lanny Lambert and Bobby Flax song, "White Lies, Blue Eyes," which had been recorded with studio instrumentalists some weeks before with Flax and Lambert singing harmony vocals. The producers, satisfied with the result, asked Sorrentino to record "Changes of Mind" for the B side, a song that he and drummer Mike Micara had written for their current band. The record was released on the Big Tree Records label under the name "Bullet" in December 1971. As "White Lies" quickly ran up the charts, guitarist Paul Granato was recruited along with keyboard/trumpet player Roget Pontbriand, and other members of the New York band Riverside Drive, to fill out a touring band. Pontbriand relates that "a booking agent named John Apostle was asked to put a band together. At that time, I had been playing with Joey Stann and the late George Ruiz at an upper-Manhattan club called Churchill's Plum. John knew us and asked us to be part of Bullet along with Sorrentino and a drummer named Mike Micara. ... We shot the promotional photos for Bullet in Central Park the day after we met Ernie." The new band appeared on American Bandstand on March 11, 1972, performing "White Lies" and "Willpower Weak, Temptation Strong."

=== After "White Lies" ===
Although the group toured for two years and recorded three more singles, only "Willpower Weak, Temptation Strong," another Lambert and Flax song, broke into the Billboard Top 100. Bullet disbanded some time before 1975. Pontbriand later played trombone for K.C. and the Sunshine Band and trumpet for Wild Cherry. He served as Director of Popular Music in the Music Department of Palm Beach Atlantic University in West Palm Beach, Florida, until his retirement in 2021. Micara went on to record and tour with Gary U.S. Bonds and play drums on film soundtracks before changing careers to public-school teaching. He died in 2017. Granato, Pontbriand, and Sorrentino are musically active in South Florida. Stann performs in Edison, New Jersey, with Southside Johnny.

On January 31, 2020. Sorrentino, Granato, and Pontbriand sang "White Lies" alongside music faculty at a concert of 1971 music at Palm Beach Atlantic University.

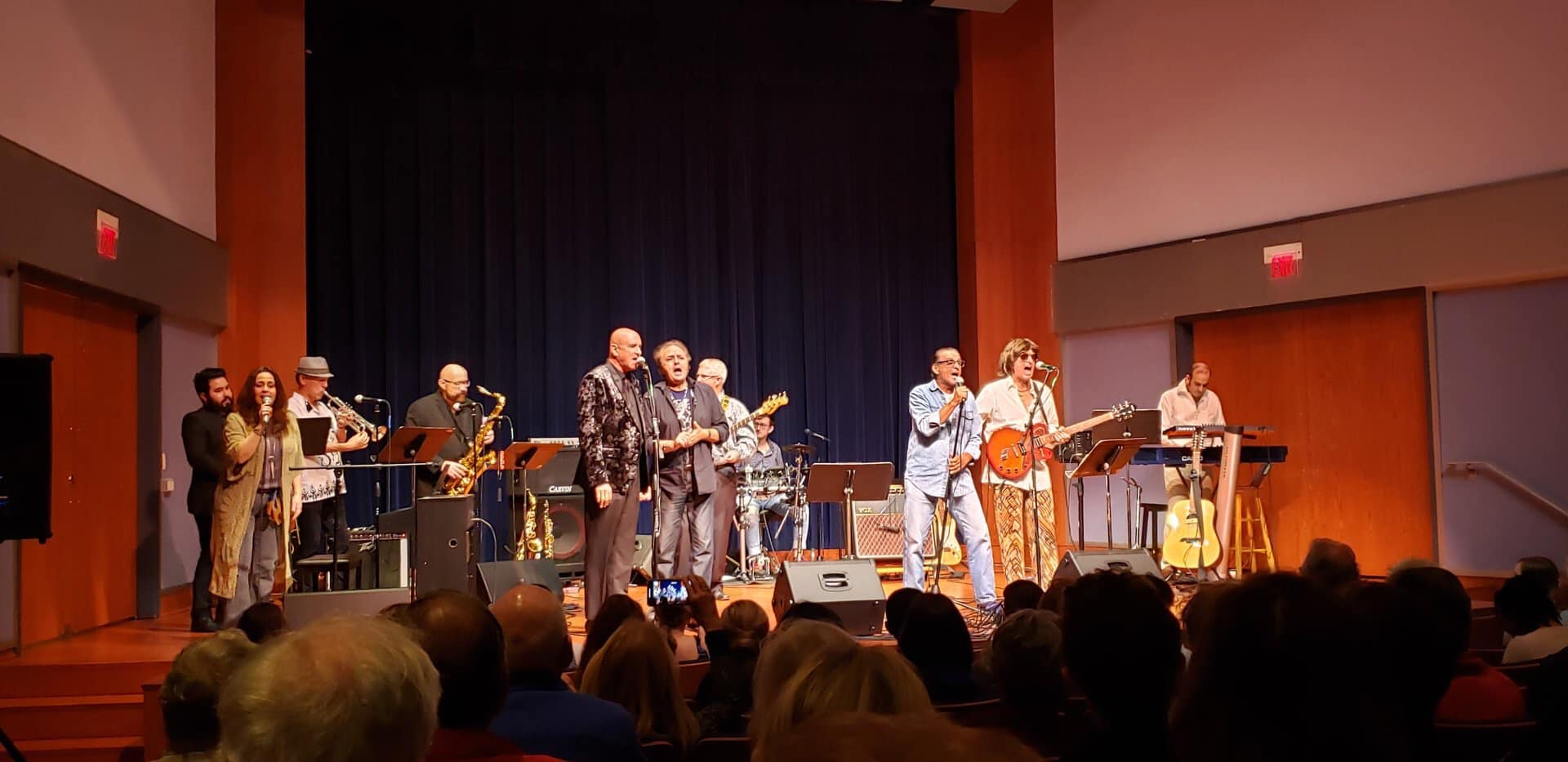
Sorrentino, Pontbriand, and Granato performing with Palm Beach Atlantic University faculty in January 2020

=== The "Other" Bullet ===
A British band, once known as "Bullet", often is mistakenly given credit for "White Lies, Blue Eyes". They changed their name to Hard Stuff after the song's American release in late 1971.

== Personnel (1971–1972) ==
- Ernie Sorrentino – lead vocals
- Paul Granato – guitar
- Roget Pontbriand – keyboards, trumpet, backing vocals
- Joey Stann – organ, sax
- George Ruiz – bass
- Mike Micara (1952–2017) – drums

== Discography ==
=== Singles ===
| Year | Title | Chart positions | |
| Year | Title | US | AUS |
|---|---|---|---|
| 1971 | "White Lies, Blue Eyes" | 28 | 62 |
| 1972 | "Willpower Weak, Temptation Strong" | 96 | - |
| 1972 | "Little Bit O' Soul" | 107 | - |
