= Hard Stuff =

English hard rock band

- Also known as: Bullet, Daemon
- Origin: England
- Genres: Hard rock, heavy metal
- Years active: 1971–1973
- Label: Purple
- Past members: John Cann; Paul Hammond; John Gustafson; Harry 'Al' Shaw

Hard Stuff were an English hard rock group which included John Du Cann and Paul Hammond, formerly of Atomic Rooster. Also in the line-up were vocalist Harry 'Al' Shaw, formerly of Curiosity Shoppe and latterly Export, and John Gustafson, formerly of Quatermass.

Du Cann and Hammond had left Atomic Rooster due to disagreements with Vincent Crane over the increasingly bluesy, soulful direction in which he wanted to take that band. Consequently, compared with Atomic Rooster's more progressive leanings, Hard Stuff were based more heavily on aggressive guitar.

Originally, Du Cann, Hammond and Shaw had formed a band provisionally entitled Daemon, with the intention of eventually touring and recording under the name Atomic Rooster. Gustafson was invited to join them on that basis, but after finding out that Crane retained the rights to the Atomic Rooster name, the quartet decided to continue anyway, but under the name Bullet instead.

After recording about half an album's worth of material together, Shaw was dismissed from the lineup and was not replaced with another frontman, his tracks being re-recorded and vocals for remaining tracks being handled by Du Cann and Gustafson, both of whom had served as lead vocalists in their prior bands. Prior to the release of their debut album, they were prompted to change their name yet again, this time to Hard Stuff, due to a legal threat from a US band also called Bullet.

Hard Stuff toured across Europe, particularly in Germany and Italy, often as support to Deep Purple and Uriah Heep. Their career was curtailed by a car crash in which Du Cann and Hammond were badly injured. Although the release of a second album went ahead, the band were soon to fold. Harry 'Al' Shaw eventually resurfaced in the early 1980s with Liverpool-based NWOBHM band Export.

== Bullet/Hard Stuff discography (all on Purple Records) ==
- "Hobo" / "Sinister Minister" (as Bullet, 1971)
- "Jay Time" / "The Orchestrator" (1972)
- Bulletproof (1972)
- "Inside Your Life" / "(It's) How You Do It" (1972)
- Bolex Dementia (1973)

Archival releases

- Bullet: The Entrance to Hell (Angel Air) (these recordings were previously unofficially released under the invented band name Daemon)

These recordings feature Harry Shaw on lead vocals, who left Bullet before they renamed to Hard Stuff.
