= Quatermass (album) =

Studio album by Quatermass
- Released: May 1970
- Studio: E.M.I., London
- Genre: Progressive rock; hard rock
- Length: 50:35
- Label: Harvest
- Producer: Anders Henriksson

Quatermass chronology
Quatermass (1970)	Quatermass II: Long Road (1997)

Alternative cover
- 1975 re-issue

Singles from Quatermass
- 1. "Black Sheep of the Family" Released: July 1970 (W. Germany); 2. "Gemini" Released: 1971 (Italy)

Professional ratings
Review scores
Source	Rating
AllMusic	4/5 stars

Quatermass is the only studio album by English progressive rock band Quatermass, released in May 1970 by Harvest Records. It was produced by Sweden's Anders "Henkan" Henriksson.

== Critical reception ==
Despite the album not performing well on the charts at the time of the release, it started to attract considerable attention in 1975, when guitarist Ritchie Blackmore covered the second track, "Black Sheep of the Family" on the debut album from Rainbow. As a consequence of the revived interest, Quatermass was re-released and sold a further 20,000 copies. Since then, it has gained a cult status and has received favorable retrospective reviews. Mike DeGagne has given the album a rating of four stars out of five on AllMusic. He called Quatermass "a must-have for prog rock enthusiasts, especially lovers of the keyboard-dominated style which flourished in the early '70s".

== Track listing ==
Side one
No.	Title	Writer(s)	Length
1.	"Entropy (instrumental)"	Pete Robinson	1:10
2.	"Black Sheep of the Family"	Steve Hammond	3:41
3.	"Post War Saturday Echo"	Robinson, John Gustafson, Graham Ross	9:43
4.	"Good Lord Knows"	Gustafson	2:54
5.	"Up on the Ground"	Gustafson	7:11

Side two
No.	Title	Writer(s)	Length
6.	"Gemini"	Hammond	5:54
7.	"Make Up Your Mind"	Hammond	8:44
8.	"Laughin' Tackle (instrumental)"	Robinson	10:35
9.	"Entropy (Reprise) (instrumental)"	Robinson	0:42
Total length:			50:35

1990 Repertoire Records CD edition bonus tracks
No.	Title	Writer(s)	Length
10.	"One Blind Mice"	Gustafson	3:17
11.	"Punting"	Gustafson	7:10
Total length:			61:01

2013 Esoteric Records CD edition
No.	Title	Length
1.	"One Blind Mice" (bonus track - 45 A-side)
2.	"Entropy"
3.	"Black Sheep of the Family"
4.	"Post War Saturday Echo"
5.	"Good Lord Knows"
6.	"Up on the Ground"
7.	"Gemini"
8.	"Make Up Your Mind"
9.	"What Was That"
10.	"Make Up Your Mind (reprise)"
11.	"Laughin Tackle"
12.	"Punting" (bonus track - 45 B-side)
13.	"Afraid Not" (bonus track - rehearsal)
14.	"Bluegaloo/Broken Chords/Scales" (bonus track - live 1974)

== Personnel ==
=== Quatermass ===
- J. Peter Robinson – keyboards
- John Gustafson – vocals, bass guitar
- Mick Underwood – drums

=== Technical personnel ===
- Anders Henriksson – producer
- Jeff Jarratt – engineer
- Andy Stevens – engineer
- Hipgnosis – cover design, photography
- Steve Newport – design, illustration (1975 re-issue)
