= Ray Fenwick =

English guitarist (1946–2022)

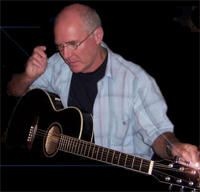
- Fenwick in 2007

Background information
- Born: Raymond John Fenwick; 18 July 1946; Romford, Essex, England
- Died: 30 April 2022 (aged 75)
- Genres: Hard rock, blues rock, progressive rock, heavy metal, jazz fusion
- Occupations: Musician, songwriter, producer
- Instruments: Guitar, keyboards, vocals
- Years active: 1962–2022
- Label: Angel Air
- Formerly of: Ray and the Red Devils, The Syndicats, Spencer Davis Group, Tee-Set, After Tea, Ian Gillan Band, Fancy, Forcefield, Steve Howe's Remedy
- Website: rayfenwick.com

Raymond John Fenwick (18 July 1946 – 30 April 2022) was an English guitarist and session musician, best known for his work in The Syndicats and in The Spencer Davis Group in the 1960s, and as the lead guitarist of Ian Gillan's post-Deep Purple solo project, the Ian Gillan Band.

== Career ==
Fenwick's first professional group was a ska and bluebeat group called Ray and the Red Devils. In 1964, he joined The Syndicats, replacing Steve Howe, and in turn being replaced by Peter Banks. In 1965, he joined the Dutch group Tee-Set, from which developed another group After Tea.

He was with The Spencer Davis Group from 1967 to 1969. He also co-wrote the theme music to the 1970s television series Magpie, which was credited to "The Murgatroyd Band", which was basically The Spencer Davis Group at the time. Fenwick wrote all songs on the group's 1969 album Funky (briefly released in the US in 1970; full release only in 1997) and recorded his own album Keep America Beautiful, Get a Haircut in 1971 with a similar line-up, albeit minus Davis.

In July 1972, he played guitar on a number of the tracks for Bo Diddley's Chess Records album The London Bo Diddley Sessions. During the 1970s, he was part of the Ian Gillan Band. He participated in Jon Lord's live album Windows (1974). He was also in the group Fancy, who had the hits "Touch Me" and a cover of Chip Taylor's "Wild Thing".

He also was a member of the studio project Forcefield (1987–1989) along with Tony Martin (Black Sabbath), Cozy Powell (Rainbow, Black Sabbath, Emerson, Lake and Powell), Jan Akkerman and Neil Murray (Whitesnake, Black Sabbath).

He returned to sessions and then featured on former Rainbow vocalist Graham Bonnet's album Here Comes the Night (1991).

In 2003, Fenwick toured with Yes guitarist Steve Howe as part of his band Steve Howe's Remedy, appearing on the live concert DVD of Steve Howe's Remedy Live released in 2005. He appears on Steve Howe's compilation Anthology 2: Groups and Collaborations, released 2016. The two guitarists play together on the track "Slim Pickings", recorded 2002, which closes the album.

Fenwick produced Jo Jo Laine's girl group single "When the Boy's Happy" on Mercury Records under the name Jo Jo Laine & The Firm.

== Personal life ==
Fenwick taught guitar and jazz grades at various colleges and schools in Britain, including Boston College, Lincolnshire. He died at home on 30 April 2022.

== Discography ==
Solo

- 1971 Keep America Beautiful, Get a Haircut
- 1979 Queen of the Night / Between the Devil and Me (SP)
- 1997 Groups and Sessions 1962–1978 (anthology)

with Ian Gillan Band

- 1976 Child in Time
- 1977 Clear Air Turbulence
- 1977 Scarabus
- 1977 Live at the Budokan (1983, European release)

Other projects

- 1967 National Disaster (After Tea)
- 1968 With Their New Face On (Spencer Davis Group)
- 1969 Funky (Spencer Davis Group)
- 1971 Magpie (Theme From Thames Television Programme) (The Murgatroyd Band)
- 1972 Hector and other Peccadillos (Mike Absalom)
- 1973 Gluggo (Spencer Davis Group)
- 1973 The London Bo Diddley Sessions (Bo Diddley)
- 1973 Living in a Back Street (Spencer Davis Group)
- 1974 The Butterfly Ball and the Grasshopper's Feast (Roger Glover)
- 1974 Windows (Jon Lord)
- 1974 Wild Thing (Fancy)
- 1976 Turns You On (Fancy)
- 1976 Wizard's Convention (Eddie Hardin)
- 1982 Circumstantial Evidence (Eddie Hardin)
- 1981 Finardi (Eugenio Finardi)
- 1982 Secret Streets (Eugenio Finardi)
- 1984 Life on Mars (Johnny Mars)
- 1985 Wind in the Willows (Eddie Hardin)
- 1987 Long Hot Night (Minute By Minute)
- 1989 Timewatch (Minute By Minute)
- 1991 Wind in the Willows – A Rock Concert (Eddie Hardin)
- 1993 First of the Big Band – BBC1 Live in Concert '74 (Ashton & Lord)
- 1995 Wizard's Convention 2 (Eddie Hardin)
- 1995 Still a Few Pages Left (Hardin & York)
- 1997 Musicians Union Band (recorded in 1971)
- 1997 24 Carat (Tee Set)
- 1997 Guitar Orchestra (recorded in 1971)
- 2003 The Fabulous Summer Wine (Summer Wine) (recorded in 1972)
- 2005 Live (Steve Howe's Remedy) - DVD
- 2016 Anthology 2: Groups and Collaborations (Steve Howe) - Fenwick and Howe play together on "Slim Pickings"
