= Clear Air Turbulence (album) =

- Art by Chris Foss

Studio album by Ian Gillan Band
- Released: 4 April 1977
- Recorded: July–September 1976
- Studio: Kingsway Recorders, London
- Genre: Jazz fusion; progressive rock
- Length: 40:38
- Label: Island
- Producer: Ian Gillan Band

Ian Gillan Band chronology
Child in Time (1976)	Clear Air Turbulence (1977)	Scarabus (1977)

The Rockfield Mixes
- Cover of the 1997 release on Angel Air Records

Professional ratings
Review scores
Source	Rating
Allmusic	3/5 stars

Clear Air Turbulence is the second studio album by British jazz rock band Ian Gillan Band, released in 1977 with cover by Chris Foss. The album was initially worked on during the period July 1976 to September 1976. A UK tour was promoted, though all of the dates were postponed until April 1977 in order that the new album could be rerecorded and remixed at Kingsway Recorders, London.

The album was reissued in 1989 by Virgin Records on CD, and in 2010 by Edsel Records.

== Track listing ==
All tracks written by Ray Fenwick, Ian Gillan, John Gustafson, Mark Nauseef, Colin Towns.

Side one

1. "Clear Air Turbulence" – 7:35
2. "Five Moons" – 7:30
3. "Money Lender" – 5:38

Side two

1. "Over the Hill" – 7:14
2. "Goodhand Liza" – 5:24
3. "Angel Manchenio" – 7:17

== The Rockfield Mixes ==
Ian Gillan became dissatisfied with the final mixes of the album and this delayed its eventual release. What eventually became the album Clear Air Turbulence was remixed at Kingsway before release, but the original mix had taken place at Rockfield Studios in Wales. In 1997 the original mix was released by Angel Air Records under the title The Rockfield Mixes and represents a "cleaner" (or at least earlier) version of the album. It also includes an extra track which didn't make it to the original release. The track list was altered as follows:

1. "Over the Hill" – 7:20
2. "Clear Air Turbulence" – 7:47
3. "Five Moons" – 7:34
4. "Money Lender" – 5:40
5. "Angel Manchenio" – 7:21
6. "This Is the Way" – 2:03
7. "Goodhand Liza" – 5:20

The 2004 release of the original mix

== The Rockfield Mixes Plus ==
In 2004 a further variant of the album was released as The Rockfield Mixes Plus containing four previously unreleased tracks and an interview with Ray Fenwick. The extra tracks were:

- "Apathy" (backing track) – 4:14
- "Over the Hill" (live) – 9:50
- "Smoke on the Water" (live) – 7:38
- "Mercury High" (backing track) – 3:33

== Personnel ==
Ian Gillan Band

- Ian Gillan – vocals
- Colin Towns – keyboards and flutes
- Ray Fenwick – guitars and vocals
- John Gustafson – bass guitar and vocals
- Mark Nauseef – drums and percussion

Additional musicians

- Phil Kersie – tenor saxophone solo on "Five Moons"
- Martin Firth – baritone saxophone
- John Huckridge – trumpets
- Derek Healey – trumpets
- Malcolm Griffiths – trombone
- Cy Payne – brass arrangements

== Production notes ==
- Produced by Ian Gillan Band
- Recorded and mixed at Kingsway Recorders, London
- Recording engineer – Brad Davis
- Remix engineer – Louis Austin
- Assistant engineers – Paul Watkins, Bob Broglia
- Brass arrangements – Cy Payne on "Clear Air Turbulence", "Money Lender" and "Goodhand Liza"
