= Ian Gillan =

English singer (born 1945)

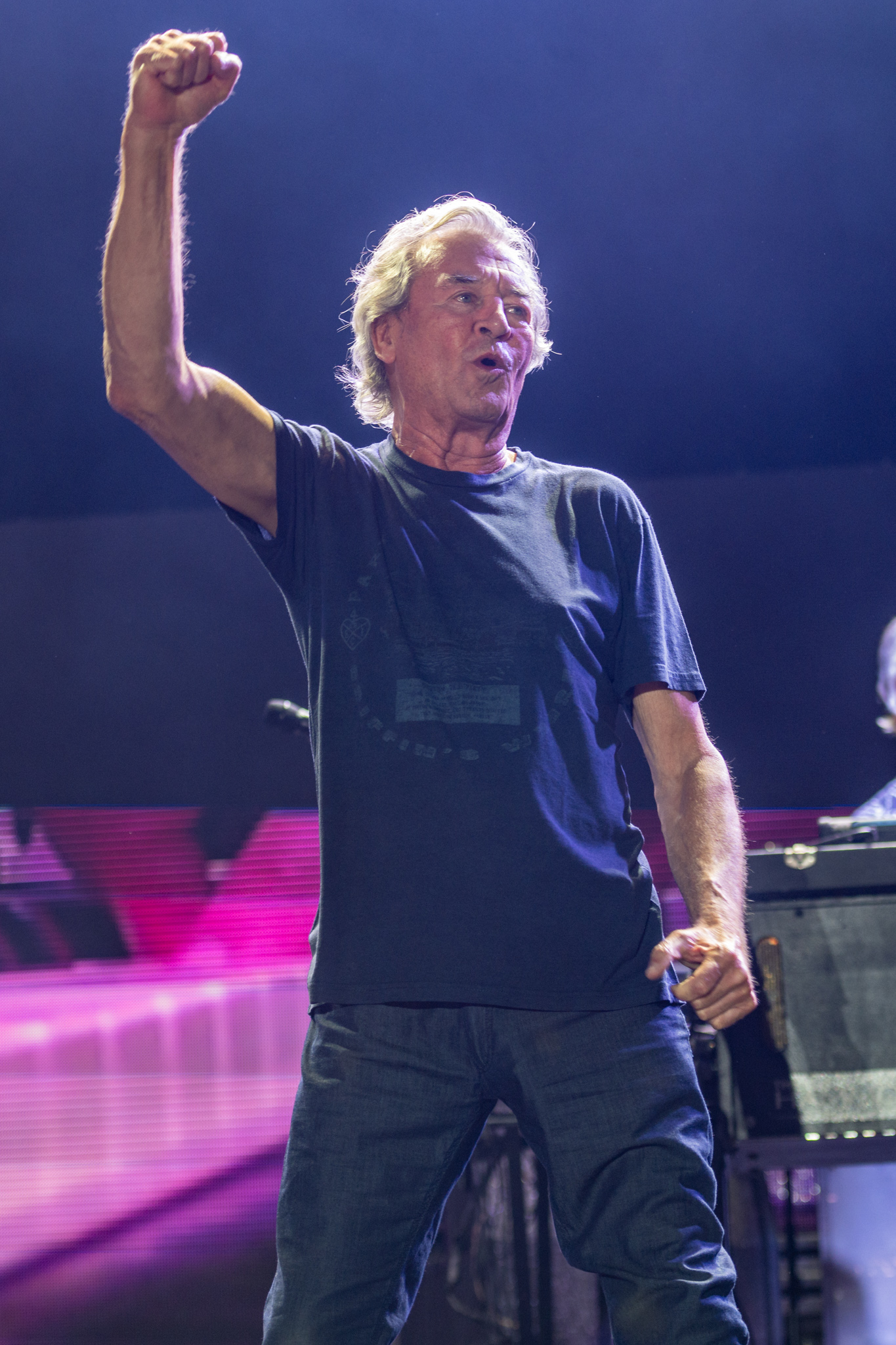
- Gillan performing live with Deep Purple in Germany, July 2022

Background information
- Born: 19 August 1945 (age 81); Chiswick, Middlesex, England
- Genres: Hard rock; heavy metal; jazz fusion; progressive rock
- Occupations: Singer; songwriter
- Years active: 1962–present
- Label: Independent
- Member of: Deep Purple
- Formerly of: The Javelins; Episode Six; Ian Gillan Band; Gillan; Black Sabbath; Gillan & Glover; WhoCares
- Website: gillan.com

Ian Gillan (born 19 August 1945) is an English singer who is best known as the lead singer and lyricist for the rock band Deep Purple. He is known for his powerful and wide-ranging singing voice.

Initially influenced by Elvis Presley, Gillan started and fronted several local bands in the mid-1960s, and eventually joined Episode Six when their original singer left. He first found widespread commercial success after joining Deep Purple in 1969. He resigned from the band in June 1973, having given a lengthy notice period to their managers. After a short time away from the music business, he resumed his music career with solo bands the Ian Gillan Band and Gillan, before a year-long stint as the vocalist for Black Sabbath in 1983. The following year, Deep Purple reformed and two more successful albums followed before he left in 1989. He returned to the group in 1992, and has remained its lead singer ever since.

In addition to his main work—performing with Deep Purple and other bands during the 1970s and 1980s—he sang the role of Jesus in the original recording of Andrew Lloyd Webber's rock opera Jesus Christ Superstar (1970), performed in the charity supergroup Rock Aid Armenia, and engaged in a number of business investments and ventures, including a hotel, a motorcycle manufacturer, and music recording facilities at Kingsway Studios.

More recently, he has performed solo concerts concurrently with his latter career in Deep Purple, and his work and affinity with Armenia, combined with his continued friendship with Tony Iommi since his brief time in Black Sabbath, has led him to form the supergroup WhoCares with Iommi. His solo career outside of Deep Purple was given a comprehensive overview with the Gillan's Inn box set in 2006.

== Early life ==
Gillan was born on 19 August 1945 at Chiswick Maternity Hospital in Middlesex (now West London) and grew up in Hounslow. His father, Bill, was a storekeeper at a factory in London, who came from Govan, Glasgow and left school at 13, while his mother, Audrey, was the eldest of four children, who all enjoyed music and singing, and whose father had been an opera singer and amateur pianist. Gillan was a Boy soprano at St Paul's Church Hounslow, his sister, Pauline, was born in 1948. One of Gillan's earliest musical memories was of his mother playing "Rondo alla Turca" on the piano.

He grew up moving between council flats before settling in a three-bedroom semi-detached on a council estate in Cranford, Middlesex. He was fond of animals in his early life, and enjoyed reading Dan Dare comic strips. His parents separated after Audrey discovered that Bill had had an affair that started while he was stationed in the army during World War II.

Ian began attending Hounslow College and stayed there through his early teenage years. He was influenced by Elvis Presley by hearing his records at home and at the local youth club. Gillan briefly attended Acton County Grammar School (now Acton High School) to take his O Levels but became distracted from studies after leaving the local cinema having watched a Presley film, deciding that he wanted to be a movie actor. He subsequently took a job manufacturing ice machines in Hounslow.

== Career ==
=== Early years ===
Gillan's first attempt at a band was called Garth Rockett and the Moonshiners, and consisted of himself on vocals and drums, alongside guitarist Chris Aylmer, who later went on to work with Bruce Dickinson. The band covered songs such as Tommy Roe's "Sheila" and The Shadows' "Apache". He discovered he couldn't sing and play drums at the same time, so settled on the role of lead vocalist, performing regularly at St Dunstan's Hall, the local youth club. He soon switched to another local band who also played at Dunstan's Hall, Ronnie and the Hightones, who renamed themselves "the Javelins" after he joined. The band played covers of Sonny Boy Williamson, Chuck Berry, Jerry Lee Lewis and Little Richard, and were early customers of then-local music shop owner Jim Marshall. The Javelins disbanded in March 1964, with guitarist Gordon Fairminer leaving to join what eventually became the group Sweet.

After the Javelins, Gillan joined a soul band, Wainwright's Gentlemen, which included another future Sweet member, drummer Mick Tucker. The band recorded a number of tracks including a cover of The Hollies hit "Ain't That Just Like Me". Although the band played several local popular music venues, they did not find success, so in April 1965, he decided to join Hatch End-based Episode Six.

=== Episode Six ===
Gillan had been contacted by Episode Six's manager Gloria Bristow, who worked for Helmut Gordon, original manager of The Detours, later to become the Who. He replaced original lead singer Andy Ross, who left to get married, and joined keyboardist and singer Sheila Carter, guitarists Graham Carter and Tony Lander, bassist Roger Glover and drummer Harvey Shields. Gillan considers Episode Six to be his first truly professional band, and in their early days they were sponsored and championed by Tony Blackburn, who occasionally accompanied Gillan on stage. Later, as well as performing concerts in the UK, Episode Six also toured Germany and Beirut, and had regular appearances on the BBC Light Programme. During his time with Episode Six, Gillan began writing songs together with Glover, forming an ultimately long-lasting partnership. After a strained tour of Beirut, Shields left the band and was replaced first by John Kerrison, then by Mick Underwood. Underwood had previously played in The Outlaws with Ritchie Blackmore, and it was via him that Ian knew about Deep Purple. By 1969, after having released nine singles, none of which charted in the UK, and finding their style of music too restrictive for him, he decided to leave Episode Six.

=== Deep Purple, 1969–1973 ===
By spring 1969, Deep Purple had had a top 5 US hit with "Hush", but the band, particularly Ritchie Blackmore, Jon Lord and Ian Paice, decided their future lay in hard rock, rather than the psychedelic pop sound of the early band. In June 1969, Blackmore, Lord and Paice went to see Episode Six perform at a pub gig and subsequently offered Gillan the job as new lead singer, asking him if he also knew any good bassists. Since Glover was by this point a reasonably experienced songwriter, he was also recruited. They were both accepted into the band on 16 June 1969, replacing singer Rod Evans and bassist Nick Simper, respectively. The old line up of Deep Purple continued to do several concerts until the end of The Book of Taliesyn Tour. Evans and Simper were both fired by managers Tony Edwards and John Coletta after the last show of that tour, which was at the Top Rank Club in Cardiff on 4 July.

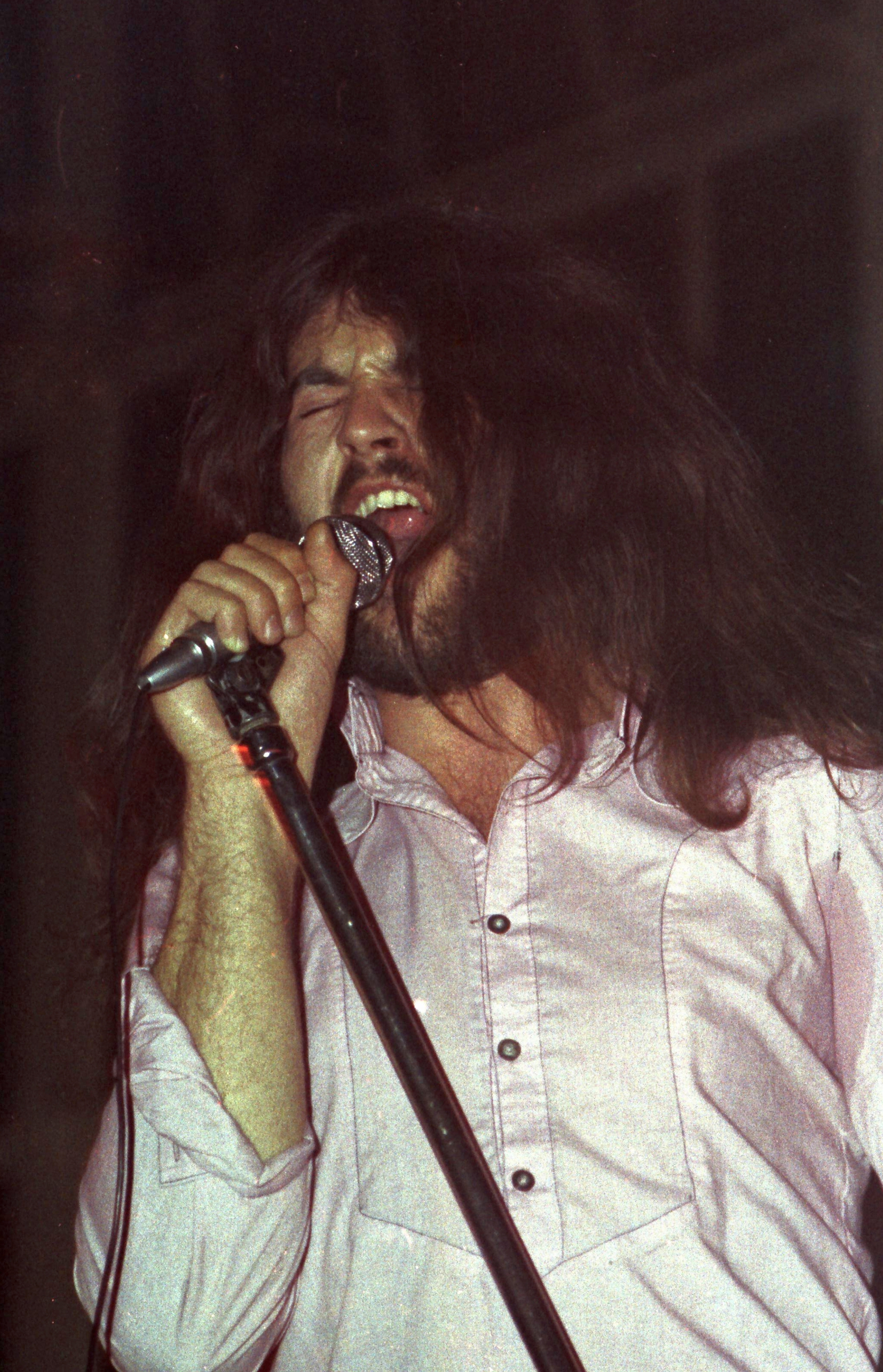
Gillan onstage with Deep Purple in Hamburg, 1971

Gillan made his first onstage appearance with Deep Purple at the Speakeasy in London's West End on 10 July. As the band had only been rehearsing for a few weeks, they relied on older instrumentals such as "Wring That Neck" and "Mandrake Root" to fill in a set. Unsure of what to do, Gillan found a pair of congas onstage, and decided to play them during these instrumental sections.

Deep Purple Mk.II continued rehearsing at Hanwell Community Centre. One of Gillan's first contributions to the band during these rehearsals was the vocal melody and lyrics to "Child in Time". At Hanwell, the band wrote what would eventually become most of In Rock during 1969, though they were interrupted in September to perform Lord's Concerto for Group and Orchestra, a one-off performance in September at the Royal Albert Hall with the Royal Philharmonic Orchestra. Gillan, along with Blackmore, was initially unhappy at having to perform the concerto, and wrote the lyrics to the second movement on the afternoon of the performance on a napkin in an Italian restaurant.

Gillan has said he was inspired by Arthur Brown to incorporate screaming into his own style: "He changed my life".

In 1970, Gillan received a call from Tim Rice, asking him to perform the part of Jesus on the original 1970 album recording of Jesus Christ Superstar, having been impressed with his performance on "Child in Time". After rehearsing a few times with Rice and Andrew Lloyd Webber, he recorded his entire vocal contributions in three hours. He was subsequently offered the lead role in the 1973 film adaptation. Gillan demanded to not only be paid £250,000 for his role in the movie, but also insisted, without the consent of his manager, that the entire band be paid because filming would conflict with a scheduled tour. The producers declined, instead casting Ted Neeley in the Jesus role, and Gillan continued on in the band.

After 1971, particularly after the release of Fireball, Gillan started to become disillusioned with the workload of the band, who had not had any holiday since their initial rehearsals at Hanwell. He started drinking heavily, and relationships between him and the rest of the band became strained, particularly with Blackmore. On 6 November 1971, he collapsed with hepatitis while waiting to board a plane in Chicago, cancelling the remainder of a US tour.

By December 1972, having recorded Machine Head, Made in Japan and the yet-to-be-released Who Do We Think We Are with Deep Purple, Gillan finally decided the workload had driven him to exhaustion. Unlike some band members, he was unhappy about Made in Japan, and disliked live albums in general. He tended to go into the studio after the rest of the band had recorded and finished the backing tracks, particularly for Who Do We Think We Are, to lay down his vocals separately. He had been continually at loggerheads with Blackmore, disagreeing about music regularly, which culminated in Gillan writing "Smooth Dancer" about him. While on tour in Dayton, Ohio, he sat down and wrote a resignation letter to the band's managers, stating he intended to leave the band, effective from 30 June 1973.

=== After Deep Purple ===
After his departure from Deep Purple, Gillan retired from performing to pursue various unsuccessful business ventures. These included a £300,000 investment in a hotel near Oxford. A second was the Mantis Motor Cycles project, which suffered from the collapse of the British motorcycle industry in the mid-1970s, culminating in Gillan being forced to file for liquidation. A more successful opportunity, however, came with his investment in Kingsway Studios in 1974. This led to a live performance of the Butterfly Ball on 16 October 1975, replacing Ronnie James Dio at the last minute.

=== Ian Gillan Band ===
In 1975, Gillan formed the Ian Gillan Band with guitarist Ray Fenwick, keyboardist Mike Moran, quickly replaced with Mickey Lee Soule and then Colin Towns on keyboards, Mark Nauseef on drums and John Gustafson on bass. Their first album, Child in Time, was released in July 1976, followed by Clear Air Turbulence in April 1977 and Scarabus in October. The sound of the band had a distinct jazz-rock aspect which, although interesting to Gillan, proved commercially unsuccessful, particularly since punk rock was popular at the time.

=== Gillan ===
Gillan then formed a new band, simply called Gillan, retaining Towns (who would co-write most of the material), and adding guitarist Steve Byrd, bassist John McCoy and drummer Pete Barnacle. Byrd and Barnacle were quickly replaced by Bernie Tormé and by former Episode Six bandmate Mick Underwood, after Gillan saw Torme playing with his punk trio. This band had a more high-powered hard rock sound, and the release of Mr. Universe in October 1979 saw Ian Gillan back in the UK charts although the independent record company the album came out on – Acrobat Records – folded soon after the album was released, prompting a contract with Richard Branson's Virgin Records.

Some time earlier, around Christmas 1978, Gillan was visited by Blackmore, who offered him the position of lead vocalist in Rainbow, following Dio's departure from it. Gillan declined due to the smaller workload the band had compared to his own. However, the pair did jam together for three nights at Marquee Club – the first time the two men had shared a stage since 1973.

Gillan continued releasing Glory Road in 1980, which resulted in the band making the first of several appearances on Top of the Pops. He considered the album to be his best work since Machine Head nearly a decade earlier. Following subsequent album Future Shock, Tormé left following disagreements over the band’s finances and after missing an appearance on Top of the Pops. He was replaced by Janick Gers. Tormé later sued Gillan for music royalties and won. Gers appeared on the band's next two albums, Double Trouble and Magic.

In 1982 Ian Gillan announced the band would fold, as he needed to rest his damaged vocal cords. The rest of the band Gillan, particularly McCoy and Towns, were not happy at the sudden disbanding of the group so soon after the success of Magic.

=== Black Sabbath ===
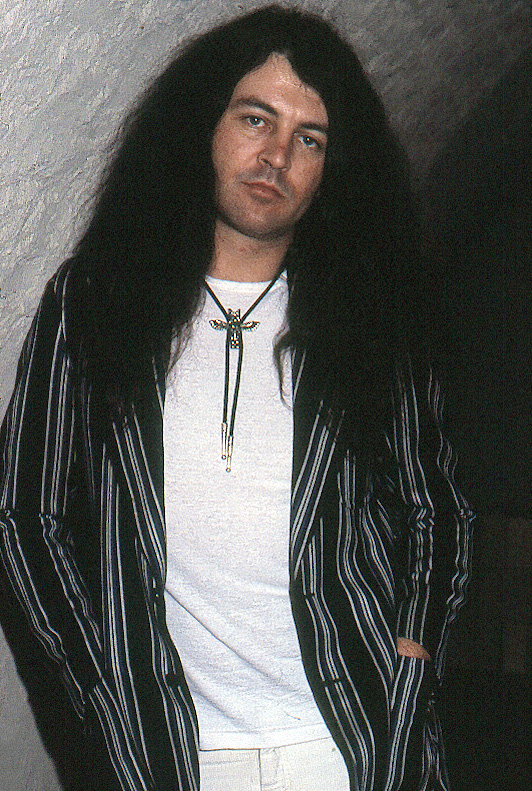
Gillan in Barcelona, 1983

In 1983, manager Don Arden invited Gillan to join Tony Iommi, Geezer Butler and Bill Ward – founding members of Black Sabbath – in a supergroup. Although the band had reservations, on 6 April 1983, it was formally announced that Gillan had replaced Ronnie James Dio in Sabbath. The group recorded Born Again at the Manor Studios in Oxfordshire. Ward recalled that he "didn't particularly like some of the lyrics that Ian was bringing forward and putting into the songs. Not because Ian doesn't write good lyrics or anything like that; I think Ian is an excellent performer, great singer and often at times I think his lyrics can be quite brilliant. But I just have a personal difference in what I like to hear in the way of lyrics, and so I felt terribly disconnected."

Citing health problems, Ward decided not to accompany the others during the subsequent tour, and was replaced by Bev Bevan.

Gillan was required to learn Sabbath's back catalogue, but had difficulty remembering the words. His solution was to write the lyrics on a perspex folder and put it on the stage floor, turning the pages with his feet. Unfortunately dry ice on stage made it impossible to read the words, resulting in the audience catching glimpses of him peering over the microphone to sing a few lines and then disappearing below the dry ice to read the next set. Along with material from Born Again and older Sabbath numbers, the band regularly played Deep Purple's "Smoke on the Water" as an encore. Gillan decided that he could not have a long-term role as Sabbath's singer and quit after a second North American tour. "We did an album and world tour and I loved every minute of it," he reflected. "It was the longest party I'd ever been to."

=== Reunion of Deep Purple, 1984–1989 and 1992–2026-present ===
After the disappointment of Black Sabbath, Gillan joined a reunited Deep Purple in April 1984, announcing their comeback on Tommy Vance's radio show. The reformed band rehearsed in Stowe, Vermont and recorded the album Perfect Strangers which was followed by a highly successful world tour. Another studio album with this formation, The House of Blue Light followed in 1987 but Gillan was concerned with the final results, stating "There's something missing in the overall album. I can't feel the spirit of the band."

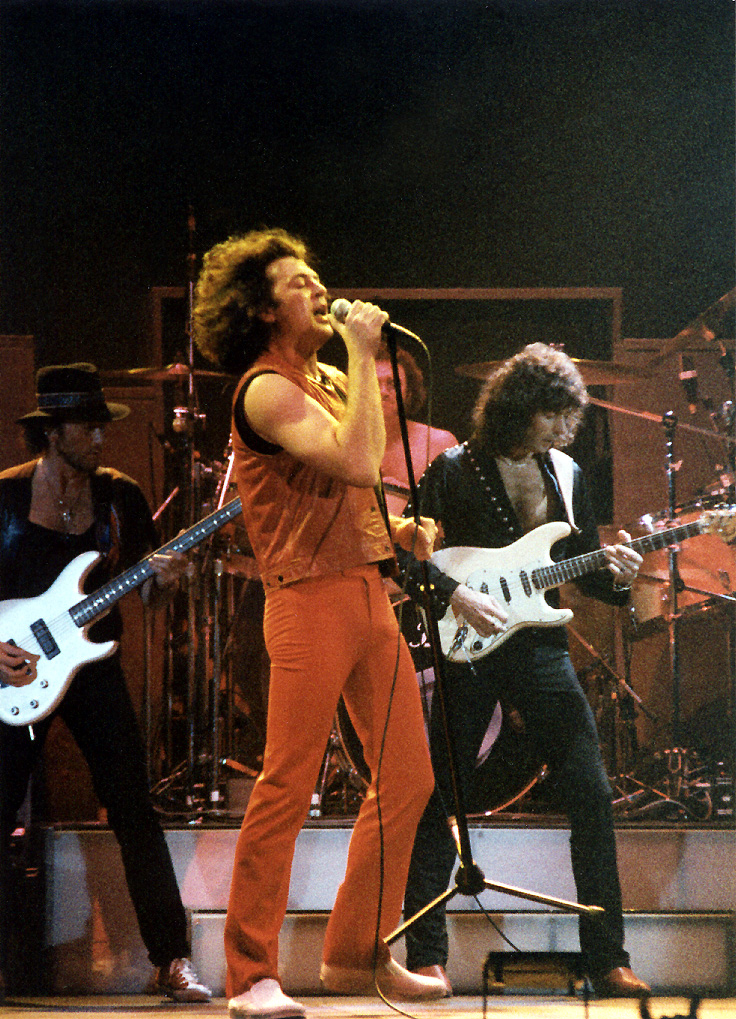
Gillan performing live with Deep Purple at the Cow Palace, San Francisco, 1985

This was followed by the live album Nobody's Perfect in 1988. The live album also featured a studio re-recording of the 1968 hit "Hush" with Gillan on vocals, to commemorate Deep Purple's 20th anniversary. (The original 1968 release had been sung by Rod Evans). Gillan later remarked that the album was "the embodiment of all the things wrong with Purple."

In contrast to his experiences with Deep Purple in the 1970s, Gillan felt frustrated that the band were no longer working enough. To fulfill his contract with Virgin, he formed a side project with Glover, writing and recording songs which didn't fit Purple's established hard rock style, which resulted in the album Accidentally on Purpose. By 1989, tensions between Gillan and Blackmore had resurfaced, due to the former's greater enthusiasm for touring and differences over the music – the song "Mitzi Dupree" on The House of Blue Light is the original demo as Blackmore refused to re-record it. This culminated in Blackmore calling a rehearsal session without Gillan. After an acrimonious argument Glover told Gillan, "Ian you've gone too far this time," and he was fired.

Gillan, meanwhile, formed a new version of Garth Rockett and the Moonshiners with keyboardist Mark Buckle, bassist Keith Mulholland, drummer Louis Rosenthal and guitarists Harry Shaw and Steve Morris. The band toured regularly through 1989, and recorded the album Naked Thunder. Gillan later expressed dissatisfaction with the album, calling it "rather hum-de-dum". During this time, Gillan also made an appearance on a re-recording of "Smoke on the Water" with Rock Aid Armenia, consisting of himself with Bryan Adams, Tony Iommi, David Gilmour, Roger Taylor, Brian May, Bruce Dickinson and Paul Rodgers as a charity record for aid relief in Armenia following the then-recent earthquake. He continued to tour with his solo band, albeit with several line-up changes throughout Europe, the US and Russia.

At the urging of Glover, Lord and Paice, who wanted him in the fold for the band's 25th anniversary tour, Gillan rejoined Deep Purple in 1992 to record the album The Battle Rages On. Gillan was unhappy with working on the album, as it had already been partially completed with Joe Lynn Turner, and he was only required to write replacement lyrics and vocal melodies, which, unsurprisingly, drew criticism from Blackmore. Blackmore left Deep Purple after the European tour promoting the album in 1993. Gillan and Blackmore subsequently repaired their relationship with each other decades later. On 22 June 1992, Gillan released a compilation of his solo work titled Cherkazoo and Other Stories.

Gillan was especially enthusiastic about carrying on after Blackmore's departure, and after a brief stint with Joe Satriani, Deep Purple recruited Dixie Dregs/Kansas guitarist Steve Morse. Gillan was keen to make changes to the live set immediately, adding the then-seldom played "Maybe I'm a Leo" (named after his birth sign) and "When a Blind Man Cries" – the latter becoming a mainstay in the band's setlist ever since. He said that their first album with Morse, Purpendicular, "was a such important record for Deep Purple that without that [other records] couldn't have been possible." He has remained Purple's lead singer, and the band has found more success touring than with producing records.

Gillan pays particular interest to the lyrics in Deep Purple and considers it his prime composing role within the band. Discussing the importance of lyrics, he said: "Words have to sound good. They have to sound like an instrument, they have to have the right percussive value." He described the words of 2003's Bananas as "politics mostly."

I haven't ever had any ambition in my life. I just drift from day to day with a stupid grin on my face.

— Ian Gillan

In July 2026, Deep Purple's latest album, the 13 track recording, Splat!, was released, celebrated on their 86 show World tour, across 28 countries on three continents. Gillan also launched plans for his first ever public speaking series of engagements, Talking Gib'rish Tour, scheduled for April/May 2027, a personal reflection on his more than six decades of experiences, music and his outlook on life.

=== Later solo activity ===
Though Gillan has kept touring with Deep Purple regularly since 1994, he has found time to commit to other projects.

On 31 March 2006 Gillan appeared at the Tommy Vance tribute concert in London. He was accompanied by Roger Glover, Steve Morris, Dean Howard, Michael Lee Jackson, Harry James, Sim Jones and Richard Cottle.

In April 2006 Gillan released a CD/multimedia project to document his 44-year career called Gillan's Inn. Tony Iommi, Jeff Healey, Joe Satriani, Dean Howard, as well as current and former members of Deep Purple such as Jon Lord, Roger Glover, Ian Paice, Don Airey and Steve Morse are featured on this 2006 CD and DVD. The project, produced by Nick Blagona, includes a re-recorded selection of his Deep Purple, Black Sabbath and solo tracks. At the same time as Gillan's Inn, Gillan announced that his solo albums with the Ian Gillan Band and Gillan from the 1970s and 1980s would be re-issued late in 2006 and early 2007 through Demon Records.

Gillan performed the vocals in the song Eternity from the 2006 video game Blue Dragon, composed by Nobuo Uematsu.

Ian Gillan sang on two songs off the Jon Lord & Hoochie Coochie Men studio album, Danger: White Men Dancing, released in late 2007. On 2 April 2007 Gillan released a DVD Highway Star – A Journey in Rock. The DVD has 6 hours of footage including documentaries and music clips. This was followed in February 2008 by a double live album on Edel Records, Live in Anaheim that features Gillan and Deep Purple classic songs and several rarities. A companion DVD was released in May 2008.

On 3 May 2008 Ian Gillan performed at the Jeff Healey memorial concert in Toronto, Canada. He had previously played live with Healey in Toronto in February 2005. He released a studio album titled One Eye to Morocco in March 2009.

In the 2010s, Gillan performed occasionally with orchestras in Europe, including rearrangements of Deep Purple songs.

=== WhoCares ===
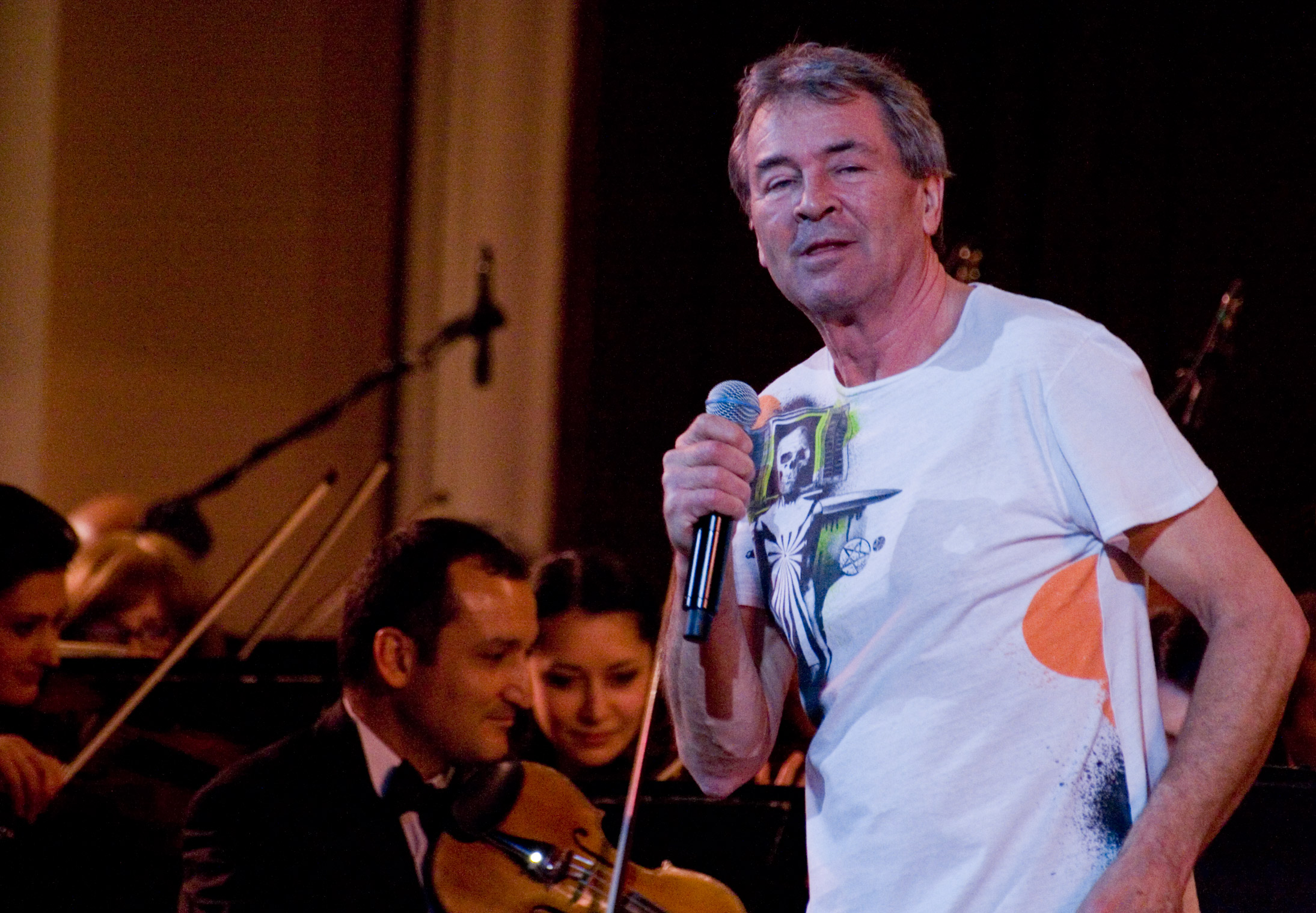
Gillan performing with the State Philharmonic Orchestra of Armenia in 2010

Gillan has expressed particular fondness for Armenia and has maintained popularity there since Rock Aid Armenia in 1989, which has led to him forming the supergroup WhoCares as a side-project to Deep Purple. On 2 October 2009, in honour of the 20th anniversary of Rock Aid Armenia, Gillan together with Tony Iommi, Geoff Downes, and the project organiser Jon Dee were received by the Prime Minister of Armenia who awarded them with the republic's Orders of Honour.

On 26 and 27 March 2010, in Yerevan, Gillan performed with State Philharmonic Orchestra of Armenia. At a press conference in Yerevan on 27 March, Gillan said he considers Armenia his spiritual motherland.

In 2010, Ian Gillan met Tony Iommi, Nicko McBrain and Jon Lord, Mikko Lindström from HIM and Jason Newsted at a studio in London to finish recording a song called "Out of my Mind", which was released the following year. This was for the benefit of the music school to be built in Gyumri, Armenia – a project Ian Gillan has been working on with others since his 1990 solo concerts in Yerevan.

On the flight back from Armenia in 2011, after each receiving the Armenian Presidential medal of Honour, Gillan and Iommi decided to form the side project WhoCares for ad hoc recordings (and possible performances) dedicated to raising money for specific causes. On 20 September 2013 Ian Gillan participated in the opening of the Octet Music School in Gyumri. The Eastern Diocese of the Armenian Church of America named Ian Gillan as its 2014 "Friend of the Armenians" and presented him the award at the 112th Diocesan Assembly in New York City.

=== Non-musical side projects ===
In 2010 Ian Gillan hosted a documentary about the Polish composer and pianist Frédéric Chopin in Poland directed by Jerzy Szkamruk. Chopin's Story is about the rise of the composer and documents his Polish years. The film has won several international awards, including the Best Documentary award at Tourfilm International Festival in Florianopolis, Brazil. It was aired on the Polish channel Discovery Historia on 21 June 2011. It was subsequently released on DVD.

== Personal life ==
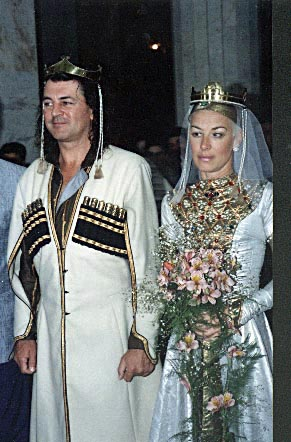
Ian and Bron, dressed in Georgian national wedding costumes celebrate their wedding during Gillan's 1990 visit to Tbilisi, Georgia

Gillan was in a relationship with Zoe Dean from 1969 to 1978. They had known each other since his time in Episode Six. In 1984, Gillan married his girlfriend Bron (1955 – 19 November 2022), to whom he had dedicated "Keep It Warm" from Black Sabbath's 1983 album Born Again. Twice they renewed their marriage vows, during forty-years together until her death in Exeter Hospital of heart failure. Their daughter Grace Gillan is also a singer who has performed with her father and for the band Papa LeGal. Gillan lives near Lyme Regis, Dorset and has a home in southern Portugal.

Gillan supports Queens Park Rangers and is a cricket fan.

His surname is sometimes misspelled as "Gillian". Gillan himself made light of this in the lyrics to "MTV", a track from Deep Purple's 2005 album Rapture of the Deep, when he sang about "Mr. Grover 'n' Mr Gillian".

=== Health ===
In a November 2025 interview with Uncut, Gillan confirmed that he has only 30% vision and that his eyesight "won't get better". He also opened up about potentially retiring from music: "I think if I lose my energy I'm going to stop. I don't want to be an embarrassment to anyone. We're not far off that. It creeps up on you – you don't really notice."

On 31 October 2026, it was announced that Gillan had been hospitalized after a medical emergency that prompted Deep Purple to postpone the rest of their European/UK Tour until further notice. That includes the shows in Germany on 31 October in Leipzig (at the QI Arena) and on 1 November in Hamburg (at the Sporthalle), then in Dortmund, Berlin, Frankfurt, Nuremberg; in Amsterdam (in The Netherlands) ; in Strasbourg, Bordeaux, Nantes and Lyon (in France) as well as Newcastle-upon-Tyne, Glasgow, Birmingham, Manchester and London (in the UK). The Latin America leg of their tour due to begin in December 2026 remains on schedule so far.

On 7 November 2026, Gillan announced that he was recovering after "successful" surgery:

I had a procedure yesterday which was successful. I now have to rest, in order to make a complete recovery and ensure that I'm as fit as can be before getting back to work [...]

The exact nature of the medical emergency and the subsequent surgery has not been disclosed (yet).

== Selected discography ==
Jesus Christ Superstar (1970) By Andrew Lloyd Webber and Tim Rice. With Murray Head, Yvonne Elliman, John Gustafson, and musicians such as Neil Hubbard, Henry McCullough, J. Peter Robinson, Karl Jenkins and John Marshall.

with Deep Purple

- Concerto for Group and Orchestra (1969) (Live)
- Deep Purple in Rock (1970)
- Fireball (1971)
- Machine Head (1972)
- Made in Japan (1972) (Live)
- Who Do We Think We Are (1973)
- Perfect Strangers (1984)
- The House of Blue Light (1987)
- The Battle Rages On (1993)
- Purpendicular (1996)
- Abandon (1998)
- Bananas (2003)
- Rapture of the Deep (2005)
- Now What?! (2013)
- Infinite (2017)
- Whoosh! (2020)
- Turning to Crime (2021)
- =1 (2024)
- Splat! (2026)

with Black Sabbath

- Born Again (1983)

with The Javelins

- Sole Agency and Representation (1994)
- Ian Gillan and the Javelins (2018)

with Ian Gillan Band & Gillan

- Child in Time (1976)
- Clear Air Turbulence (1977)
- Scarabus (1977)
- Live at the Budokan (1977/1983)
- Gillan (1978)
- Mr. Universe (1979)
- Glory Road (1980)
- Future Shock (1981)
- Double Trouble (live) (1981)
- Magic (1982)

Solo

- Accidentally on Purpose (1988, with Roger Glover)
- Naked Thunder (1990)
- Toolbox (1991)
- Dreamcatcher (1997)
- Gillan's Inn (2006)
- Live in Anaheim (2008)
- One Eye to Morocco (2009)

with Michalis Rakintzis

- Get Away and I think I know (1993), from the album Etsi Maresei

with WhoCares (also known as Ian Gillan, Tony Iommi & Friends)

- Ian Gillan & Tony Iommi: WhoCares (2012)

Rock Aid Armenia (1990): With Bryan Adams, Bruce Dickinson, Paul Rodgers, Geoff Beauchamp, Keith Emerson, Geoff Downes, Brian May, David Gilmour, Ritchie Blackmore, Alex Lifeson, Chris Squire and Roger Taylor

== Timelines ==
=== Solo band timeline ===
- Ian Gillan – lead vocals
- Colin Towns – keyboards, flute (1976–1982), backing vocals (1977–1978)
- Ray Fenwick – guitars, backing vocals (1975–1978)
- John Gustafson – bass, backing vocals (1975–1978)
- Mark Nauseef – drums (1975–1978)
- Mike Moran – keyboards (1975–1976)
- Mickey Lee Soule – keyboards (1976)
- John McCoy – bass (1978–1982)
- Steve Byrd – guitar (1978–1979; died 2016)
- Liam Genockey – drums (1978)
- Pete Barnacle – drums (1978–1979)
- Mick Underwood – drums (1979–1982; died 2024)
- Bernie Tormé – guitar (1979–1981; died 2019)
- Janick Gers – guitar (1981–1982)
- Dean Howard – guitar (2006)
- Michael Lee Jackson – guitar (2006–2009)
- Rodney Appleby – bass, backing vocals (2006–2009)
- Michael Lee – drums (2006–2009)
