= Ian Gillan Band =

English progressive jazz-rock band (1975–1978)

- L-R: Towns, Nauseef, Gillan, Gustafson, Fenwick

Background information
- Also known as: Shand Grenade
- Origin: England
- Genres: Progressive rock; jazz fusion
- Years active: 1975–1978
- Label: Island
- Spinoffs: Gillan
- Spinoff of: Deep Purple
- Past members: Ian Gillan; Ray Fenwick; John Gustafson; Mark Nauseef; Mike Moran; Mickey Lee Soule; Colin Towns

The Ian Gillan Band were an English progressive jazz-rock band formed by singer Ian Gillan of Deep Purple in 1975. Their sound is a departure from the heavy metal of Deep Purple by featuring a progressive jazz fusion sound, more similar to bands such as Brand X.

== History ==
After leaving Deep Purple in June 1973, Ian Gillan had retired from the music business to pursue other business ventures, including motorcycle engines, a country hotel / restaurant (with a guitar shaped swimming pool), and ownership of the Kingsway Recorders studio, where from April 1974 he began to work on his first post-Deep Purple solo tracks. These ventures, apart from the recording studio, all ended in failure. This fact, combined with a warm reception to his guest appearance at Roger Glover's Butterfly Ball live show at the Royal Albert Hall, London, on 16 October 1975 (he sang "Sitting in a Dream" as a substitute for Ronnie James Dio, who was banned by Ritchie Blackmore to take part in it) prompted him to resume a singing career and form a new band.

Initially called Shand Grenade, a combination of Shangri-la and Grenade, Gillan was persuaded by the management to change the band's name to the Ian Gillan Band. He recruited guitarist Ray Fenwick, bass player John Gustafson, keyboard player Mike Moran and Elf percussionist Mark Nauseef on drums. Using Roger Glover as producer and session musician, this line-up recorded their first album Child In Time in December 1975 / January 1976. In February 1976 Moran was replaced by Mickey Lee Soule (ex-Elf and Rainbow), but for the recording of follow-up album Clear Air Turbulence he was dropped in May 1976 in favour of Colin Towns.

The band had some success in Japan but none at all in North America and only cult status in Europe, their jazz fusion direction unappealing to pop and rock fans alike. Their first album, Child In Time, reached 55 on the UK charts and 36 in Sweden. Their third album, Scarabus (1977), had more of a rock sound but retained the jazz fusion direction. Released at the height of punk rock, there was no success beyond Japan and their label Island Records dropped them.

The following year Gillan dissolved the band but retained Colin Towns and formed a new band called simply Gillan. A live album was released after the breakup. John Gustafson said: "Gillan decided he didn’t like the band’s direction and wanted to do more rock stuff. In reality, he should have put his foot down a lot earlier. I personally was expecting Deep Purple stuff, but he let us do whatever we wanted."

== Members ==
=== Ian Gillan Band ===
- Ian Gillan – lead vocals (1975–1978)
- Ray Fenwick – guitars, backing vocals (1975–1978)
- John Gustafson – bass guitar, backing vocals (1975–1978)
- Mark Nauseef – drums (1975–1978)
- Mike Moran – keyboards (1975–1976)
- Mickey Lee Soule – keyboards (1976)
- Colin Towns – keyboards (1976–1978), backing vocals (1977–1978)

== Discography ==
=== Studio albums ===
- Child in Time (1976, Oyster)
- Clear Air Turbulence (1977, Island)
- Scarabus (1977, Virgin Records)

=== Live albums ===
- Live at the Budokan (1978, Eastworld)
- Live: Yubin Chokin Hall, Hiroshima (2001, Angel Air)
- Live at the Rainbow 1977 (2002, Angel Air)

=== Compilation albums ===
- Anthology (2002)
- Rarities 1975–1977, (2003)

=== Singles ===
- "You Make Me Feel So Good" / "Shame" (Europe, 1976)
- "Down the Road" / "Lay Me Down" (US/Japan, 1976)
- "Country Lights / Poor Boy Hero" (Japan, 1977)
- "Twin Exhausted / Five Moons" (Japan, 1977)
- "Mad Elaine" / "Mercury High" (UK, 1978)
- "Smoke on the Water" (live) / "Mad Elaine" (Japan, 1978)
