= John Gustafson (musician) =

English musical artist (1942–2014)

- Also known as: Johnny Gustafson, Johnny Gus
- Born: John Frederick Gustafson; 8 August 1942; Liverpool, Lancashire, England
- Died: 12 September 2014 (aged 72)
- Genres: Rock; hard rock; pop rock; beat; jazz fusion; folk rock
- Occupations: Musician, songwriter, producer
- Instruments: Bass guitar, vocals, guitar, piano
- Years active: 1960s–2014

John Frederick "Johnny" Gustafson (8 August 1942 – 12 September 2014) was an English bass guitar player and singer, who had a lengthy recording and live performance career. During his career, he was a member of the bands The Big Three, The Merseybeats, Quatermass, Roxy Music, The Pirates and Ian Gillan Band.

== Career ==
Born in Liverpool to a father of Swedish descent and mother of Irish descent, he is known for his work with 1960s bands The Big Three and The Merseybeats, and for singing on the original recording of Jesus Christ Superstar as Simon Zealotes. He made an appearance on Roger Glover's The Butterfly Ball and the Grasshopper's Feast album track, "Watch Out for the Bat", as a vocalist.

He is also known for playing bass guitar for several incarnations of the Ian Gillan Band and for his earlier participation in the progressive rock band, Quatermass. He also re-formed The Pirates, originally the backing band for Johnny Kidd.

Gustafson performed on three studio albums for Roxy Music in the period from 1973 through 1975. He was frequently not with the band on live dates, getting replaced by John Wetton or Sal Maida as he was touring a lot with Shawn Phillips (as can be heard on Shawn Phillips live in the 70's). His last record with the band, Siren, included their only American top 40 hit single, "Love Is the Drug". Front man Bryan Ferry later called Gustafson a "wonderful player", adding, "“Love Is the Drug” wouldn't have been anything without the bass playing. It really b[r]ought that track alive."

He was bassist on several tracks for Flamenco guitarist Juan Martin's 1981", "The Aficionado" and "Girls of Algiers". Also played on Kevin Ayers' album The Confessions of Dr Dream, released in 1974. In 1983, he was in the group Rowdy, which included Ray Fenwick and Billy Bremner.

Married to Anne for over thirty years, Gustafson died on 12 September 2014 from cancer.

== Discography ==
With The Big Three

- At the Cavern Decca EP (1963)
- Resurrection Polydor (1973)

With The Merseybeats

- The Merseybeats Fontana (1964)
- On Stage Fontana EP (1964)
- Wishin' and Hopin' Fontana EP (1964)
- The Merseybeats Greatest Hits Look (compilation album) (1977)
- Beats and Ballads Edsel (compilation) (1982)

With Quatermass

- Quatermass Harvest (1970)

With Bullet / Hard Stuff

- "Hobo" / "Sinister Minister" – Single (1971) Purple Records (as Bullet)
- Bulletproof Purple Records (1972)
- Bolex Dementia Purple Records (1973)
- The Entrance to Hell – different mix of Bulletproof (2010) (as Bullet)

With Roxy Music

- Stranded Island (1973)
- Country Life Island (1974)
- Siren Island (1975)
- Viva! Island (1976)

With Ablution
With Peter Robinson, Jayson Lindh, Jan Schaffer, Malando Gassama, Barry De Souza, Ola Brunkert.

- Ablution CBS (1974)

With Ian Gillan Band

- Child in Time Oyster (1976)
- Clear Air Turbulence Island (1977)
- Scarabus Island (1977)
- Live at the Budokan Virgin (1978)
- The Rockfield Mixes Angel Air (1997)
- Live at the Rainbow Angel Air (1978)

With The Pirates

- Lights Out/I'm into Something Good EP (1986), with Mick Green and Frank Farley
- Still Shakin Magnum/Thunderbolt (1988), with Mick Green and Geoff Britton
- Live in Japan Thunderbolt (2001), with Mick Green and Les Sampson

=== As contributor ===
- Jesus Christ Superstar (1970) On vocals.
- Joseph And The Amazing Technicolor Dreamcoat (1974) On bass.

With Roger Glover And Guests

- The Butterfly Ball and the Grasshopper's Feast (1974) John vocals on Watch Out For The Bat.

With Shawn Phillips

- Furthermore (1974)
- Rumplestiltskin's Resolve (1976)
- Live in the 70's

With Steve Hackett

- Voyage of the Acolyte (1975) Bass on Star of Sirius

With Ian Hunter

- Ian Hunter (1975) Bass on Lounge Lizard

With Bryan Ferry

- Let's Stick Together (1976) Bass on Re-Make/Re-Model

With Gordon Giltrap

- The Peacock Party PVK (1981)
- Live Electric (1981)

With Joe Jammer

- Headway Angel Air (2015), recorded 1974 with Mitch Mitchell on drums

With Ian Paice, Tony Ashton, Jon Lord

- Malice in Wonderland (1977).the bassist was Paul Martinez

=== Solo album ===
- Goose Grease Angel Air (1997)
