= Ian Gillan discography =

Ian Gillan discography comprises the recorded output of English rock vocalist Ian Gillan, best known as the lead singer of Deep Purple across multiple tenures.

== With Wainwright's Gentlemen ==
- Rare Mod – Vol. 3 (2010, compilation, "Ain't That Just Like Me")

== With Episode Six (Compilation albums of songs recorded between 1965 and 1969) ==
- Put Yourself in My Place (1987)
- The Complete Episode Six (1991)
- BBC Radio 1 Live 1968/1969 (1997)
- Cornflakes and Crazyfoam (2002)
- Love, Hate, Revenge (2005)

== With Deep Purple (1969-1973, 1984-1988),(1993-) ==
Numerical values indicate highest position achieved in the United Kingdom album charts.

=== Studio albums ===
- Deep Purple in Rock (1970, No. 4 UK)
- Fireball (1971, No. 1 UK)
- Machine Head (1972, No. 1 UK)
- Who Do We Think We Are (1973, No. 4 UK)
- Perfect Strangers (1984, No. 5 UK)
- The House of Blue Light (1987, No. 10 UK)
- The Battle Rages On (1993, No. 21 UK)
- Purpendicular (1996, No. 58 UK)
- Abandon (1998, No. 76 UK)
- Bananas (2003, No. 85 UK)
- Rapture of the Deep (2005, No. 81 UK)
- Now What?! (2013, No. 19 UK)
- Infinite (2017, No. 6 UK)
- Whoosh! (2020, No. 4 UK)
- Turning to Crime (2021, No. 28 UK)
- =1 (2024)

=== Live albums ===
- Concerto for Group and Orchestra (1969)
- Made in Japan (1972)
- Deep Purple in Concert (1980) (Live 1970 & 1972)
- Scandinavian Nights (1988) (Live 1970)
- Nobody's Perfect (1988)
- In the Absence of Pink (1991) (Live 1985)
- Gemini Suite Live (1993) (Live 1970)
- Live in Japan (1993) (Live 1972)
- Come Hell or High Water (1994)
- Live at the Olympia '96 (1997)
- Total Abandon: Live in Australia (1999)
- The Soundboard Series (2001)
- In Concert with The London Symphony Orchestra (2000)
- Live at the Rotterdam Ahoy (2001)
- Live in Europe 1993 (2006)
- Live at Montreux 1996 (2006) (Live 1996 & 2000)
- They All Came Down To Montreux (2007)
- Live at Montreux 2011 (2011)
- The Now What?! Live Tapes (2013)
- Live in Verona (2014)
- From The Setting Sun... (In Wacken) (2015)
- ...To The Rising Sun (In Tokyo) (2015)
- The Infinite Live Recordings, Vol 1 (2017)

== With Ian Gillan Band ==
Year	Title	Peak chart positions	
Year	Title	UK	SWE
1976	Child in Time: Date: July 1976; Label: polydor records	55	36
1977	Clear Air Turbulence: Date: 4 April 1977; Label: Island	—	—
1977	Scarabus: Date: 7 October 1977; Label: Island	—	—
1978	Live at the Budokan: Date: March 1978; Label: Eastworld, Virgin	—	—

== With Gillan ==
Year	Title	Peak chart positions	Certifications (sales thresholds)
Year	Title	UK	Certifications (sales thresholds)
1978	Gillan: Date: September 1978; Label: East World	—	
1979	Mr. Universe: Date: 12 October 1979; Label: Acrobat	11	
1980	Glory Road: Date: 8 August 1980; Label: Virgin	3	UK: Silver
1981	Future Shock: Date: 17 April 1981; Label: Virgin	2	UK: Silver
1981	Double Trouble (live): Date: 30 October 1981; Label: Virgin	12	
1982	Magic: Date: September 1982; Label: Virgin	17	
1990	Live at Reading '80: Date: 1990; Label: Raw Fruit	—	
1998	The BBC Tapes Vol 1: Dead of Night 1979: Date: 1998; Label: RPM	—	
1998	The BBC Tapes Vol 2: Unchain Your Brain 1980: Date: 1998; Label: RPM	—	
2007	The Gillan Singles Box Set: Date: 23 October 2007; Label: Phantom Sound & Vision	—	
2008	The Glory Years (DVD): Date: 8 April 2008; Label: Eagle Rock	—	
2009	Live: Triple Trouble: Date: 9 November 2009; Label: Edsel	—	

== With Black Sabbath ==
Year	Title	Peak chart positions	
Year	Title	UK	USA
1983	Born Again: Date: 9 September 1983; Label: Vertigo	4	39

== Solo ==
=== Studio albums ===
Year	Title	Peak chart positions				
Year	Title	GER	SWE	UK	FIN	JPN
1988	Accidentally on Purpose (as Gillan & Glover, with Roger Glover): Date: February 1988; Label: Virgin Records	–	–	–	–	–
1990	Naked Thunder: Date: 16 July 1990; Label: Teldec, Eagle	–	27	63	–	–
1991	Toolbox: Date: 14 October 1991; Label: East West	–	–	–	–	–
1992	Cherkazoo and Other Stories (archive recordings): Date: 22 June 1992; Label: RPM Records	–	–	–	–	–
1997	Dreamcatcher: Date: October 1997; Label: Ark 21, Forbidden	–	–	–	–	–
2006	Gillan's Inn: Date: 18 April 2006; Label: Immergent	72	–	–	30	176
2009	One Eye to Morocco: Date: 6 March 2009; Label: Edel	97	–	–	–	–

=== Live albums ===
- Chris Tetley Presents: Garth Rockett & The Moonshiners (1989) [mini-album]
- Live at the Ritz '89 (2000, as Ian Gillan & The Moonshiners)
- Live in Anaheim (2008)
- Contractual Obligation #1: Live In Moscow (2019, with The Don Airey Band and Orchestra)
- Contractual Obligation #2: Live In Warsaw (2019, with The Don Airey Band and Orchestra)
- Contractual Obligation #3: Live In St. Petersburg (2019, with The Don Airey Band and Orchestra)

=== Compilations ===
- What I Did on My Vacation (1986)
- Trouble – The Best of Ian Gillan (1991)
- The Japanese Album (1993) (including different versions of 3 songs)
- The Best of Ian Gillan (1992)
- Rock Profile (1995)
- Mercury High - The Story Of Ian Gillan (2004)

=== Video ===
- Garth Rockett & The Moonshiners Live at the Ritz (1990)
- Ian Gillan Live (1990)
- Highway Star - A Journey in Rock (2007)
- Live in Anaheim (2008)

=== Singles ===
- South Africa (1988) [special single]

== With The Javelins ==
- Sole Agency and Representation (1994) (rereleased as Raving with Ian Gillan & The Javelins in 2000)
- Ian Gillan and The Javelins (2018)

== With WhoCares ==
(also known as Ian Gillan, Tony Iommi & Friends)

=== Albums ===
Year	Title	Peak chart positions			
Year	Title	NOR	BEL	SWE	GER
2012	Ian Gillan & Tony Iommi: WhoCares: Date: 13 July 2012 (Europe), 28 August 2012 (North America); Label: EarMusic	29	184	26	60

=== Singles ===
Year	Title	Peak chart positions
Year	Title	GER
2011	Out of My Mind	86

== Other projects ==
=== Performances ===
- Jesus Christ Superstar (1970)
- Rock Aid Armenia (1990)
- Pretty Maids – In Santa's Claws [EP] (1990)
- The Bolland Project – Darwin (The Evolution) (1991)
- Michalis Rakintzis – Get Away (1993)
- Ray Slijngaard & Ian Gillan – Smoke on the Water Rock 'N' Rap Extravaganza (1997)
- Jill Towers – Miserably Happy (2001)
- Dean Howard – Volume One (2004)
- Rock School [TV series soundtrack album] (2005)
- Leslie West – Guitarded (2005)
- Michael Lee Jackson – In a Heartbeat [SP] (2006)
- Nobuo Uematsu with Ian Gillan – Eternity (2006)
- Hoochie Coochie Men & Jon Lord – Danger. White Men Dancing (2007)
- Light My Fire: A Classic Rock Salute to the Doors (2014)
- Celebrating Jon Lord (2014, with Deep Purple)

=== Production ===
- Sammy – Sammy (1972)
- Jerusalem – Jerusalem (1972)
- Pussy – Feline Woman/Ska Child [SP] (1972)
- Cliff Bennett – Nightride (1981)
- Zero Nine – Blank Verse (1982)
- Jill Towers – Welcome to Dreamfield (1999)

== Selected film and TV appearances ==
- The Butterfly Ball (1977)
- Deep Purple – Heavy Metal Pioneers (1991)
- The Making of Bolland Project (1991)
- The Black Sabbath Story, Vol. 2 (1992)
- Tony Iommi: The Guitar That Drives Black Sabbath (1992)
- Rock Family Trees, ep. Deep Purple (1995)
- Pat Boone: In A Metal Mood (1996)
- Classic Albums, ep Deep Purple: Machine Head (2002)
- Roger Glover – Made in Wales (2004)
- Ian Gillan – Highway Star: A Journey in Rock (2007)
- Seven Ages of Rock, ep. Never Say Die: Heavy Metal (2007)
- Heavy Metal Britannia (2010)
- The Seventies, ep. 1970 (2010)
- Chopin's Story (2011)
- Behind The Music Remastered, ep. Deep Purple (2013)
- Heaven on Their Minds: The Creation of Jesus Christ Superstar (2015)
