= Ray Staff =

British mastering engineer

- Born: Ray Staff
- Origin: United Kingdom
- Occupation: Mastering Engineer

Ray Staff is a British mastering engineer, best known for his work with a diverse mix of artists including Led Zeppelin, The Rolling Stones, The Clash and Black Sabbath. Most recently he has mastered albums for Muse.

== Biography and career ==
Joining Trident Studios (a recording facility originally located at 17, St. Anne's Court in London's Soho district) in 1970, Ray Staff became part of the newly formed Mastering Department contributing to projects such as: David Bowie, Aladdin Sane, Ziggy Stardust and Elton John. Staff moved on to become Trident's first Chief Mastering Engineer.

For Monty Python, Staff created the world's first three-sided album by cutting two spirals on one side of the disc, creating the "hidden" third side. This was topped later with a Johnny Moped album for Ace Records, where the first track on the A-side was double cut, the two spirals then joined to play the remaining side of the album.

Whilst Senior Mastering Engineer at Sony's UK Studios, Staff became part of the international team developing Sony's proprietary archiving system.

Other classics mastered by Staff include Physical Graffiti and Presence by Led Zeppelin, Crime of the Century by Supertramp, It's Only Rock 'n Roll by The Rolling Stones and Hemispheres by Rush.

== Recent years ==
He is regularly featured in Hi-Fi publications for his work on audiophile vinyl releases. He is also much sought after by labels Alchemy Soho from the worlds of jazz, world music, classical and crossover. Staff is also building an increasing number of surround mastering projects to his portfolio, including Gary Moore, Deep Purple, Nick Cave and the Bad Seeds and Alice Cooper released during the past few months.

== Discography ==
| Year | Album | Artist | Role |
|---|---|---|---|
| 2016 | Use Less U | Mosquito-B | Mastering |
| 2002 | 24 Hour Party People; Soundtrack | Various artists | Remastering |
| 1997 | Sueños en tránsito | Nicole | Mastering |
| 2001 | 37 Brits 2001 Hits: Brit Awards | Various artists | Mastering |
| 2005 | Adam Ant Remasters; Remastered, limited-edition box set | Adam Ant | Remastering, digital remastering |
| 2000 | African Fantasy | Trilok Gurtu | Mastering |
| 1988 | African Typic Collection | Various artists | Mastering |
| 2004 | Afterlife | Joe Jackson | Mastering |
| 2004 | Afterlife; Bonus CD | Joe Jackson | Mastering |
| 2000 | The A-List | A1 | Mastering |
| 1996 | Alive at Ronnie Scott's | Carol Grimes | Engineer |
| 1972 | All The Young Dudes | Mott the Hoople | Mastering |
| 2006 | Amaral; Christmas edition | Amaral | Mastering |
| 2004 | AM-FM | The Gift | Mastering |
| 2001 | Aura | Asia | Mastering |
| 1996 | Authentic | Tim Whitehead | Mastering |
| 2000 | Balengu Village | Brice Wassy | Mastering |
| 1997 | Beautiful World | Paul Carrack | Mastering |
| 2002 | Becoming Something Else | Sugarcoma | Mastering |
| 2004 | Belle-Issima!: Sweet Memories... | The Belle Stars | Mastering |
| 1993 | Benga Blast! | Daniel Owino Misiani | Mastering |
| 2007 | Betcha Bottom Dollar | The Puppini Sisters | Mastering |
| 2006 | Betcha Bottom Dollar; UK edition | The Puppini Sisters | Mastering |
| 2001 | Biografias Do Amor | Sérgio Godinho | Remastering |
| 2001 | Bitter Suites to Succubi | Cradle of Filth | Mastering |
| 1970 | Black Sabbath; Japan bonus tracks | Black Sabbath | Remastering |
| 1972 | Black Sabbath Vol. 4 | Black Sabbath | Remastering |
| 1998 | Black to the Future | Hugh Masekela | Mastering |
| 1995 | Blue Valentine | Sarah Jane Morris | Mastering |
| 1983 | Born Again | Black Sabbath | Remastering |
| 2001 | British Steel; Bonus tracks | Judas Priest | Cut |
| 2002 | California | Perry Blake | Mastering |
| 1998 | The Cappuccino Songs | Tanita Tikaram | Mastering |
| 1976 | Child in Time | Ian Gillan Band | Mastering |
| 1991 | Clash on Broadway | The Clash | Remastering |
| 2004 | Clash on Broadway; 2004 reissue | The Clash | Remastering |
| 2002 | The Clash / London Calling / Combat Rock | The Clash | Remastering |
| 2000 | Code: Brasil - Target: Recipe | Various artists | Mastering |
| 2001 | Coincidências | Sérgio Godinho | Remastering |
| 2005 | The Collection: British Steel / Point of Entry / Screaming for Vengeance | Judas Priest | Cut, mastering |
| 2004 | The Collection: The Clash / London Calling / Combat Rock; 2004 long box set | The Clash | Remastering |
| 2005 | The Collection: The Clash / London Calling / Combat Rock; 2005 small box set | The Clash | Remastering |
| 1982 | Combat Rock | The Clash | Remastering |
| 2005 | Concrete and Street Lamps | Jake Searson | Mastering |
| 2003 | Conversations with the Unseen | Soweto Kinch | Mastering |
| 1998 | Convocatoria | Claudio Gabis | Mastering |
| 2007 | Trinity Revisited; Vinyl | Cowboy Junkies | Mastering |
| 2006 | The Cradle of Filth Box Set | Cradle of Filth | Mastering |
| 2003 | Crossing the Stone | Catrin Finch | Mastering |
| 1996 | Cuando te vi Partir | Claudia Puyo | Mastering |
| 1995 | The Curse of the Cat People: The Film Music of Roy Webb | Roy Webb | Supervisor |
| 2005 | Dakshina | Deva Premal | Mastering |
| 2003 | Damnation and a Day | Cradle of Filth | Mastering |
| 2003 | Damnation and a Day; Japan bonus tracks | Cradle of Filth | Mastering |
| 2006 | Desafio | Malú | Mastering |
| 1991 | Direction Ov Travel | PTV3 | Engineer |
| 1978 | Disguise in Love | John Cooper Clarke | Mastering |
| 2005 | Disguise in Love; Bonus tracks | John Cooper Clarke | Mastering |
| 1990 | Don't Fret | Martin Taylor | Mastering |
| 2007 | Double Trouble; Bonus tracks | Gillan | Mastering |
| 2003 | Dream Soldier | Des'ree | Mastering |
| 1980 | Duke | Genesis | Mastering |
| 1998 | Dum Dum Baby | Baby Fox | Mastering |
| 1998 | Dum Dum Baby; Japan | Baby Fox | Mastering |
| 2006 | The Early Years; Bonus CD | The Early Years | Mastering |
| 1998 | Educating Rita; Soundtrack | David Hentschel | Mastering |
| 2006 | "Eighteen" | ¡Forward, Russia! | Mastering |
| 2007 | Eighteen; 6 tracks | ¡Forward, Russia! | Mastering |
| 2000 | El Alquimista (The Alchemist) | Juan Martín | Mastering |
| 2003 | The Essential Clash; UK bonus track | The Clash | Remastering |
| 2003 | Estrella de mar | Amaral | Mastering |
| 2004 | Estrella de mar Bonus tracks | Amaral | Mastering |
| 2003 | Evolution: The Hits | Dead or Alive | Remastering |
| 2003 | Evolution: The Hits; Limited edition | Dead or Alive | Digital remastering |
| 2005 | Exits | The Boxer Rebellion | Mastering |
| 1995 | Exuberancia | Irakere | Engineer |
| 2001 | No More Shall We Part | Nick Cave and the Bad Seeds | Mastering |
| 2002 | Film Works | Ryuichi Sakamoto | Mastering |
| 2000 | "Freedom"; Australia CD | Erasure | Mastering |
| 2000 | "Freedom, Pt. 1" | Erasure | Mastering |
| 2005 | Friend or Foe; Bonus tracks | Adam Ant | Remastering |
| 1998 | Fruit Cocktail | Various artists | Engineer, mixing |
| 2007 | Future Shock; Bonus tracks | Gillan | Mastering |
| 2004 | Gaze | The Beautiful South | Mastering |
| 1944 | Get with Cab | Cab Calloway | Cutting engineer |
| 1992 | Ghostsongs | Ian Shaw | Mastering, mixing |
| 1984 | Give Daddy the Knife Cindy | Naz Nomad and the Nightmares | Post production, post producer |
| 1978 | Give 'em Enough Rope | The Clash | Remastering |
| 2006 | Give Me a Wall | ¡Forward, Russia! | Mastering |
| 2007 | Glory Road; Bonus tracks | Gillan | Mastering |
| 2004 | Golddiggas, Headnodders and Pholk Songs | The Beautiful South | Mastering |
| 1992 | Groovin' | Zachary Breaux | Engineer, mastering |
| 1990 | Guitar Paradise of East Africa | Various artists | Mastering |
| 1999 | Healing Angel | Touched by an Angel | Mastering |
| 1978 | Hemispheres | Rush | Mastering |
| 2004 | Heroes; Sony | Various artists | Remastering |
| 2000 | Highland Cathedral | Phil Coulter | Mastering |
| 2001 | History | Penguin Cafe Orchestra | Remastering |
| 1989 | Home Ground | Battlefield Band | Mastering |
| 1996 | Hot | Roy Ayers | Engineer, mastering |
| 1994 | Hot House | Reykjavik Jazz Quartet | Mastering |
| 1996 | I Gotta Right to Sing | Marion Montgomery | Engineer, mastering |
| 1999 | I Gotta Right to Sing / Nice and Easy | Marion Montgomery | Engineer |
| 2007 | I Love the Future | Caufield | Mastering |
| 2004 | I Only Wrote this Song for You: A Tribute to Johnny Thunders; Diesel Motor | Various artists | Duplication |
| 1995 | I Only Wrote this Song for You: A Tribute to Johnny Thunders; Essential | Various artists | Mastering |
| 1965 | In a Mellow Tone | Ben Webster | Mastering, preparation |
| 1996 | In Memory of Thunder | José Neto | Mastering |
| 1986 | The Indestructible Beat of Soweto | Various artists | Mastering |
| 1995 | Indestructible Beat of Soweto, Vol. 3: Thunder Before Dawn | Various artists | Mastering |
| 2005 | It Was Not Here | The Afterthought | Mastering |
| 2005 | Jazz Warrior | Abram Wilson | Mastering |
| 2001 | Kilas o Mau da Fita | Sérgio Godinho | Remastering |
| 1991 | The Kings and Queens of Township Jive: Modern Roots of the Indestructible Beat of Soweto | Various artists | Mastering |
| 1996 | Kon'ko Man | Madala Kunene | Mastering |
| 1997 | Ladies and Gentlemen We Are Floating in Space | Spiritualized | Mastering |
| 2001 | Lake of Shadows | Phil Coulter | Mastering |
| 2006 | Last Dance | The Alps | Mastering |
| 2003 | Let Freedom Ring! | Denys Baptiste | Mastering |
| 1979 | Life on the Ceiling | Michael Chapman | Editing |
| 2000 | Linn Box One | Martin Taylor | Mastering |
| 2000 | The Linn Box: 3 | Claire Martin | Mastering |
| 2006 | Live at Montreux | Rory Gallagher | Mastering |
| 2006 | Live at Montreux 1996 | Deep Purple | Mastering |
| 2007 | Live at Montreux 2002 | UB40 | Mastering |
| 1991 | Live at Ronnie Scott's | Irakere | Mastering |
| 2007 | Live at the Budokan; Special Edition | Ian Gillan Band | Mastering |
| 1994 | Live at the Point | Christy Moore | Mixing |
| 1998 | Live Evil; Remastered | Black Sabbath | Remastering |
| 2007 | Live in Asia | Asia | Mastering |
| 2004 | London Calling; 25th Anniversary Legacy Edition | The Clash | Remastering |
| 2002 | Love Is Here | Starsailor | Mastering |
| 2006 | The Love That Whirls (Diary of a Thinking Heart); Import Bonus Tracks | Bill Nelson | Mastering |
| 2000 | Loveboat | Erasure | Mastering |
| 1996 | Lozko | Maanam | Mastering |
| 2007 | Magic; Edsel Bonus Tracks | Gillan | Mastering |
| 1997 | Majoun | Richard Horowitz | Mastering |
| 2000 | Maroon | The Webb Brothers | Mastering |
| 1971 | Master of Reality | Black Sabbath | Remastering |
| 2002 | Me Without You: Music from the Motion Picture; Original Soundtrack | Various artists | Remastering |
| 2003 | Mediterraneo | Marc Antoine | Mastering |
| 2004 | Meets Scientist in a Midnight Rock Dub, Vol. 1 | King Tubby | Mastering |
| 2004 | Melek | Candan Erçetin | Mastering |
| 1989 | Mettle | Hugo Largo | Mastering |
| 2006 | Mettle; Bonus tracks | Hugo Largo | Mastering |
| 1999 | Michael Flatley's Feet of Flames | Ronan Hardiman | Mastering |
| 1979 | Mick Taylor | Mick Taylor | Mastering |
| 2000 | Midian | Cradle of Filth | Mastering |
| 2002 | Mods Mayday '79; 2 Disc | Various artists | Cutting engineer |
| 2001 | "Moon & the Sky" | Erasure | Mastering |
| 1977 | Moroccan Roll | Brand X | Mastering |
| 1977 | Motörhead | Motörhead | Post production |
| 1990 | Motörhead; Bonus tracks | Motörhead | Post production |
| 2007 | Mr. Universe; Bonus track | Gillan | Mastering |
| 2005 | MTV Unplugged | Giorgia | Mastering |
| 2005 | Multitudes | Illapu | Engineer |
| 1996 | Murder Ballads | Nick Cave and the Bad Seeds | Mastering |
| 2007 | Music for Astronauts and Cosmonauts | Húbert Nói and Howie B | Mastering |
| 2005 | Music for Films III; Bonus tracks | Brian Eno | Mastering |
| 1995 | Naked Flame | Tony O'Malley | Mastering |
| 1994 | Nebuchadnezzar | Alec Dankworth | Mastering |
| 1978 | Never Say Die! | Black Sabbath | Remastering |
| 1996 | N'ga Funk | Brice Wassy | Mastering |
| 2005 | Nice Guy | Jake Searson | Mastering |
| 1963 | Night and Day | Tubby Hayes | Mastering, preparation |
| 1986 | A Night at Ronnie Scott's, Vol. 3 | Various artists | Mastering |
| 2002 | Nil Dünyası | Nil Karaibrahimgil | Mastering |
| 2006 | Nine | ¡Forward, Russia! | Mastering |
| 2001 | No More Shall We Part | Nick Cave and the Bad Seeds | Mastering |
| 2001 | No More Shall We Part; Bonus tracks | Nick Cave and the Bad Seeds | Mastering |
| 1996 | A Normal Family | Baby Fox | Mastering |
| 2005 | Nova Latino, Vol. 4 | Various artists | Mastering |
| 2006 | Now Listen | Shakin' Stevens | Mastering |
| 2005 | Nude | Iconcrash | Mastering |
| 2000 | Obsession | Tony Hadley | Mastering |
| 2010 | Oh Vanille/Ova Nil; 180g audiophile vinyl [2010 Reissue] | Diane Cluck | Mastering |
| 2000 | Open Mind | Glen Matlock | Mastering |
| 2001 | Origin of Symmetry | Muse | Mastering |
| 2006 | Out in the Sun; Bonus track | Patrick Moraz | Cut |
| 1979 | Over the Rainbow | Trevor Watts | Cutting engineer |
| 2003 | Overgrown Eden; Japan bonus tracks | InMe | Mastering |
| 1971 | Paranoid | Black Sabbath | Remastering |
| 2004 | Pastora | Pastora | Mastering |
| 2001 | De Pequenino Se Torce O Destino | Sérgio Godinho | Remastering |
| 1998 | Perfect Time | Moya Brennan | Mastering |
| 1980 | Permanent Waves | Rush | Mastering |
| 1998 | The Philosopher's Stone | Van Morrison | Mastering |
| 2005 | Picture | Kino | Mastering |
| 2007 | The Pirate Queen; Soundtrack | Claude-Michel Schönberg | Mastering |
| 2007 | Platinum Collection; EMI Bonus Tracks | Lesley Garrett | Mastering |
| 1978 | Pleasure Signals | Wilding-Bonus | Mastering |
| 2001 | Point of Entry; Bonus tracks | Judas Priest | Mastering |
| 2001 | Pré-Histórias | Sérgio Godinho | Remastering |
| 1979 | Product | Brand X | Mastering |
| 2007 | Prog | The Bad Plus | Mastering |
| 2001 | À Queima-Roupa | Sérgio Godinho | Remastering |
| 1997 | Quiet Nights | Django Bates | Mastering |
| 2015 | Reaching For The Light | King King | Mastering |
| 2015 | Reflections | The Mentulls | Mastering |
| 1996 | Rocket | Primitive Radio Gods | Mastering |
| 1996 | Rocket; Edited, clean | Primitive Radio Gods | Mixing |
| 1977 | Round the Back | Café Jacques | Mastering |
| 2005 | Rush Hour | Sean Hargreaves Trio | Mastering |
| 1973 | Sabbath Bloody Sabbath | Black Sabbath | Remastering |
| 1996 | Sabotage; ESM | Black Sabbath | Remastering |
| 1993 | Sabroso! | Various artists | Mastering |
| 1989 | Sabroso!: Havana Hits | Various artists | Mastering |
| 2001 | Salão de Festas | Sérgio Godinho | Remastering |
| 1982 | Scatterlings | Juluka | Mastering |
| 1981 | Scientist Meets the Space Invaders | Scientist | Mastering |
| 1999 | Searchin' / Hot | Roy Ayers | Mastering |
| 1986 | Seventh Star | Black Sabbath | Remastering |
| 1990 | The Sheltering Sky | Ryuichi Sakamoto | Mastering |
| 1991 | The Sheltering Sky; Capitol | Ryuichi Sakamoto | Mastering |
| 1976 | Shouting and Pointing | Mott | Mastering |
| 1990 | Shumba | Thomas Mapfumo | Mastering |
| 1998 | Silence Between Waves | Tim Whitehead | Mastering |
| 2004 | Sixties Rebellion, Vol. 7: The Backyard Patio | Various artists | Mastering, cutting engineer |
| 1998 | Slain By Urusei Yatsura | Urusei Yatsura | Mastering |
| 2001 | Smiling & Waving | Anja Garbarek | Mastering |
| 2001 | Os Sobreviventes | Sérgio Godinho | Remastering |
| 1991 | Solo Piano | Chucho Valdés | Mastering |
| 1983 | Sonero | Henry Fiol | Mastering |
| 1964 | Sonny's Blues; Live st Ronnie Scott's | Sonny Stitt | Mastering, preparation |
| 2005 | Soul Providence | Carleen Anderson | Mastering |
| 1995 | Spirit of the Eagle | Various artists | Mastering |
| 2005 | Standard Issue | Liane Carroll | Mastering |
| 1978 | Stižemo | Laza & Ipe | Cutting engineer |
| 2006 | Stranger on the Sofa | Barry Adamson | Mastering |
| 2005 | Strip; Bonus tracks | Adam Ant | Digital remastering |
| 1997 | Sueños en tránsito | Nicole | Mastering |
| 2006 | Superbi | The Beautiful South | Mastering |
| 1996 | S'Wonderful | Elaine Delmar | Engineer, mastering |
| 2004 | Thank You for the Years | Shirley Bassey | Mastering |
| 2007 | The Elements; Standard version | Second Person | Mastering |
| 2007 | The Elements; Limited Edition version | Second Person | Mastering |
| 1977 | The Clash; UK version, [UK | The Clash | Remastering |
| 1979 | The Clash; US Version, US | The Clash | Remastering |
| 1995 | The Violin Player | Vanessa-Mae | Mastering |
| 2007 | Live at Montreux 2006: They All Came Down To Montreux | Deep Purple | Mastering |
| 2007 | Live at Montreux 2006: They All Came Down To Montreux; DVD | Deep Purple | Mastering |
| 2004 | Timeless: Daniel O'Donnell and Mary Duff | Daniel O'Donnell and Mary Duff | Mastering |
| 1997 | To Have & to Hold; Soundtrack | Various artists | Mastering |
| 2000 | Trabendo | Les Négresses Vertes | Mastering |
| 2006 | Truth and Lies | Jake Searson | Mastering |
| 2005 | "Truth and Lies"; Single | Jake Searson | Mastering |
| 1996 | Under Wheels of Confusion: 1970–1987 | Black Sabbath | Remastering |
| 1994 | The Unspoken Word | Chico Freeman | Engineer |
| 2006 | Until the Next Time | Daniel O'Donnell | Mastering |
| 2002 | Up the Bracket | The Libertines | Mastering |
| 2002 | Up the Bracket | The Libertines; US Bonus Tracks | Mastering |
| 1998 | Victim of Circumstance | David Newton | Mastering |
| 1999 | The Violin Player; Limited Edition Bonus CD-ROM | Vanessa-Mae | Mastering |
| 1993 | Virunga Volcano | Samba Mapangala | Mastering |
| 2005 | Vive Le Rock; Bonus tracks | Adam Ant | Digital remastering |
| 2007 | Wait for Me | The Pigeon Detectives | Mastering |
| 1995 | The Waiting Game | Claire Martin | Mastering |
| 2003 | War Child: Hope | Various artists | Mastering |
| 2002 | Warriors; Bonus tracks | Gary Numan | Original mastering |
| 2001 | Welcome to the Madhouse | Shy | Mastering |
| 1997 | Welcome to the World | Psycho Motel | Mastering |
| 2003 | The Well's on Fire | Procol Harum | Mastering |
| 2007 | When I Fall in Love | Lesley Garrett | Mastering |
| 1999 | Whisper to the Wild Water | Máire Brennan | Mastering |
| 2004 | Wide Eyed And Legless: The A&M Recordings | Andy Fairweather Low | Mastering |
| 1983 | Work for All | Juluka | Mastering |
| 2007 | Xitintoday; Bonus track | Nik Turner's Sphynx | Mastering |
| 1978 | Zimbabwe Frontline, Vol. 2: Spirit of the Eagle | Various artists | Mastering |
