= Gillan's Inn =

Studio album by Ian Gillan
- Released: 18 April 2006
- Studio: Metalworks Studios in Mississauga, Ontario
- Genre: Hard rock
- Length: 62:48
- Label: Immergent
- Producer: Nick Blagona, Michael Lee Jackson, Drew Thompson, John Trickett

Ian Gillan chronology
Dreamcatcher (1998)	Gillan's Inn (2006)	Live in Anaheim (2008)

Professional ratings
Review scores
Source	Rating
AllMusic	3/5 stars
Classic Rock	7/10 stars

Gillan's Inn is the fourth solo album by Ian Gillan in celebration of his 40 years as a singer. The first release was a DualDisc composed of both a CD and a DVD side. The CD featured re-recorded tracks from all eras of Ian Gillan's singing career. In a recent interview Gillan observed that, despite the number of participants and guest appearances, this was the easiest project he ever put together.

A "Deluxe Tour Edition" was released in 2007 containing bonus tracks and an expanded version of the DVD side of the original DualDisc release. The correct bonus tracks included on most versions of the disc are live versions of "Have Love Will Travel" and "Wasted Sunsets", both recorded at the House of Blues in Anaheim on 14 September 2006 (the show which would later be released on the Live in Anaheim CD). There was, however, an error in the manufacturing at one of the plants, where an early version of the master tape was sent by mistake containing a previously unreleased cover version of Marvin Gaye's "Can I Get a Witness?" at track 16 and not including the live bonus tracks. The record label, Immergent, offered to send all owners of the incorrect CD a copy of the proper disc free of charge, and let them keep the original, which is now a collector's item. The CD booklet lists the live bonus tracks on all versions. The album cover depicts an iconic bar in Buffalo, New York called "The Pink Flamingo", also known as "The Old Pink" (destroyed by fire in 2024). The album cover art was created by Don Keller.

This edition also re-instates the new version of Deep Purple's "Demon's Eye" to the CD, which was previously only included on the DVD side of the DualDisc release.

A short American tour commenced to support the release of the album. The set contained various tracks from Ian Gillan's solo work, Gillan and Deep Purple numbers performed with his live band, including songs rarely performed by Deep Purple, such as 'Wasted Sunsets' and 'Not Responsible'. Metallica's Lars Ulrich guested as a drummer during a performance in San Francisco. The set "Live in Anaheim" was released in 2008 on CD & DVD. An Australian 'Gillan's Inn' tour was planned for 2007 but bassist Rodney Appleby got shot by his unsound neighbour. He later would recover in hospital. Because of this, the Australian tour was cancelled.

== Track listing ==
=== Original CD-side of DualDisc release ===
1. "Unchain Your Brain" (Ian Gillan, Bernie Tormé, John McCoy) – 3:19
  - featuring Joe Satriani, Don Airey & Michael Lee (original version from the Gillan album Glory Road)
2. "Bluesy Blue Sea" (Gillan, Janick Gers) – 4:27
  - featuring Janick Gers (original version from the Gillan album Magic)
3. "Day Late and a Dollar Short" (Brett Bloomfield, Gillan, Leonard Haze, Dean Howard) – 5:12
  - featuring Uli Jon Roth, Dean Howard, Michael Lee & Ronnie James Dio (original version from the Ian Gillan solo album Dreamcatcher)
4. "Hang Me Out to Dry" (Gillan, Leslie West) – 3:59
  - featuring Joe Satriani & Don Airey (original version from the Ian Gillan solo album Toolbox)
5. "Men of War" (Gillan, McCoy) – 4:38
  - featuring Steve Morse & Johnny Rzeznik (original version from the Gillan album Double Trouble)
6. "When a Blind Man Cries" (Ritchie Blackmore, Gillan, Roger Glover, Jon Lord, Ian Paice) – 4:21
  - featuring Jeff Healey, Tommy Z, Jon Lord, Vasyl Popadiuk & Howard Wilson (original version by Deep Purple, b-side to Never Before)
7. "Sugar Plum" (Bloomfield, Gillan, Haze, Howard) – 4:54
  - featuring Dean Howard, Roger Glover, Don Airey & Ian Paice (original version from the Ian Gillan solo album Dreamcatcher)
8. "Trashed" (Tony Iommi, Geezer Butler, Bill Ward, Gillan) – 4:07
  - featuring Tony Iommi, Roger Glover & Ian Paice (original version from the Black Sabbath album Born Again)
9. "No Worries" (Gillan, Michael Lee Jackson) – 5:02
  - featuring Jerry Augustyniak (previously unreleased)
10. "Smoke on the Water" (Blackmore, Gillan, Glover, Lord, Paice) – 5:48
  - featuring Steve Morse, Johnny Rzeznik, Sim Jones, Ian Paice, Roger Glover, Robby Takac (original version from the Deep Purple album Machine Head)
11. "No Laughing in Heaven" (Gillan, McCoy, Tormé, Colin Towns, Mick Underwood) – 4:33
  - featuring Don Airey, Roger Glover & Ian Paice (original version from the Gillan album Future Shock)
12. "Speed King" (Blackmore, Gillan, Glover, Lord, Paice) – 3:48
  - featuring Joe Satriani, Don Airey, Rick McGirr & Michael Lee Jackson (original version from the Deep Purple album In Rock)
13. "Loving on Borrowed Time" (Gillan, Steve Morris) – 5:37
  - featuring Steve Morris, Steve Morse, Uli Jon Roth, Howard Wilson, Jaro Jarosil, Nick Blagona & Mary Jane Russell (original version from the Ian Gillan solo album Naked Thunder)
14. "I'll Be Your Baby Tonight" (Bob Dylan) – 3:03
  - featuring Joe Elliott, Ron Davis, Redd Volkaert, Charlie Quill, Mickey Lee Soule & Howard Wilson (previously unreleased cover version of the Bob Dylan classic)

=== Deluxe Tour Edition bonus tracks ===
1. "Demon's Eye" (Blackmore, Gillan, Glover, Lord, Paice) – 4:40
  - featuring Jeff Healey, Jon Lord, Michael Lee Jackson, Rodney Appleby & Michael Lee (original version from the Deep Purple album Fireball – inserted at track 10)
2. "Can I Get a Witness?" – previously unreleased cover version of the Marvin Gaye song (only included in error on rare early pressings)
3. "Have Love Will Travel" (Richard Berry) – 3:40
  - featuring Randy Cooke, Michael Lee, Dean Howard & Joe Mennonna (live at House of Blues, Anaheim, CA 14 Sep 2006)
4. "Wasted Sunsets" (Blackmore, Gillan, Glover) – 4:04
  - featuring Randy Cooke, Michael Lee, Dean Howard & Joe Mennonna (live at House of Blues, Anaheim, CA 14 Sep 2006)

Michael Lee Jackson played guitar on all tracks except 14. Rodney Appleby played bass on all tracks except 7, 8 and 11.

== Chart performance ==
Year	Chart	Position
2006	Finland	30
2006	Australia	30
2006	Germany	72
2006	Japan	176

== Personnel ==
Personnel taken from Gillan's Inn liner notes.

- Ian Gillan – vocals
- Joe Satriani – lead guitar (1, 4, 13)
- Michael Lee Jackson – rhythm guitar (1–8, 10–14), lead guitar (2–5, 10, 12), backwards guitar (3), guitar (9)
- Don Airey – keyboards (1, 4, 7, 12, 13), Hammond organ (11)
- Rodney Appleby – bass guitar (1–6, 9–11, 13–15)
- Michael Lee – drums (1–5, 10, 13), backing vocals (11)
- Uli Jon Roth – guitar fills (3), lead guitar (14)
- Dean Howard – lead guitar (3, 7), backing vocals (11)
- Ronnie James Dio – harmony vocals (3)
- Steve Morse – lead guitar (5, 11), guitar (14)
- John Rzeznik – guitar (5), additional rhythm guitar (11), backing vocals (11)
- Jeff Healey – lead guitar (6, 10)
- Tommy Z – additional rhythm guitar (6)
- Jon Lord – Hammond organ (6, 10, 11)
- Vasyl Popadiuk – violin (6)
- Howard Wilson – drums (6, 14, 15)
- Nick Blagona – tambourine (6, 14), percussion (11)
- Roger Glover – bass guitar (7, 8, 12), backing vocals (11)
- Tony Iommi – lead and rhythm guitar (8)
- Ian Paice – drums (8, 11, 12)
- Jerry Augustyniak – drums (9)
- Sim Jones – violin (11)
- Robby Takac – bass (11)
- Emil Latimer – percussion (11)
- Allen Farmelo – percussion (11)
- Cliff Bennett – backing vocals (11)
- Steve Morris – backing vocals (11), lead guitar (14)
- The Mississauga Singers – (11)
- Fanny Craddock – additional rhythm guitar (12)
- Rick McGirr – keyboards (13)
- Jaro Jarosil – cello (14)
- Mary Jane Russell – backing vocals (14)
- Ron Davis – accordion (15)
- Redd Volkaert – lead guitar (15)
- Charlie Quill – rhythm guitar (15)
- Mickey Lee Soule – piano (15)
- Joe Elliott – harmony vocals (15)

Production

- Mike Exeter – engineer, guitar engineering
