= The Glory Years =

Live album by Gillan
- Released: April 8, 2008
- Recorded: Oxford Polytechnic, February 18, 1981
- Genre: Hard rock, Heavy metal
- Label: Eagle Rock
- Producer: Terry Shand and Geoff Kempin

Ian Gillan Video chronology
| Highway Star – A Journey in Rock (2007) | The Glory Years (2008) | Live in Anaheim (2008) |

The Glory Years is a DVD of the rock group Gillan, released in 2008 by Eagle Rock Entertainment. It consists of a live concert recorded at Oxford Polytechnic, England on February 18, 1981 for the BBC series 'Rock Goes to College', and several of the band's guest performances on German TV and BBC's TV chart show Top of the Pops.

== Track listing ==
1. "Unchain Your Brain" (Gillan/McCoy/Torme)
2. "Mr. Universe" (Gillan/Towns)
3. "No Easy Way" (Gillan/McCoy/Torme)
4. "Trouble" (Leiber/Stoller)
5. "Mutually Assured Destruction" (Gillan/McCoy/Torme/Towns/Underwood)
6. "On The Rocks" (Gillan/Towns)
7. "Vengeance" (Gillan/Towns)
8. "New Orleans" (Frank Guida/Joseph Royster)

Live at Oxford Polytechnic, Feb 18, 1981 (first transmitted on Feb 23, 1981)

9. "Vengeance" (Gillan/Towns)

German TV

10. "Sleeping On The Job" (Gillan/Towns)

Promotional video

11. "Trouble" (Leiber/Stoller)
12. "New Orleans" (Guida/Royster)
13. "No Laughing in Heaven" (Gillan/McCoy/Torme/Underwood)
14. "Mutually Assured Destruction" (Gillan/McCoy/Torme/Towns/Underwood)

Top of the Pops (BBC TV)

== Personnel ==
- Ian Gillan - Lead vocals.
- Bernie Torme - Guitar.
- John McCoy - Bass guitar.
- Colin Towns - Keyboards.
- Mick Underwood - Drums.
