= What I Did On My Vacation =

What I Did on My Vacation

Compilation album by Ian Gillan
- Released: 30 June 1986
- Recorded: 1977–1982
- Length: 93:29
- Label: 10 Records (UK); Virgin (USA); Toshiba EMI (Japan)

Ian Gillan chronology
| Magic (1982) | What I Did on My Vacation (1986) | Toolbox (1991) |

What I Did on My Vacation is an official compilation album from Ian Gillan, released in 1986 in UK by 10 Records. The album covers Gillan's recordings between 1977 and 1982 and was released in three formats (2LP, CD, MC). All songs from the album had been previously released. Although not credited on the cover, "Scarabus" is preceded by an instrumental piece by Colin Towns, which was used as the intro to "On The Rocks" (from the Glory Road album). The LP version set boasts four more tracks than the CD version.

== Critical reception ==
Jeff Clark-Meads, reviewer of British music newspaper Music Week, left neutral review on album. He simply stated that the album contains "Gillan's finer moments with bands that have borne his name" within "a period between leaving and re-joining Deep Purple."

== Track listing ==
LP
Side one

1. "Scarabus" - 1977
2. "Money Lender" - 1977
3. "Puget Sound" - 1979
4. "Mad Elaine" - 1977

Side two

1. "Time and Again" - 1980
2. "Vengeance" - 1979
3. "No Easy Way" - 1980
4. "If I Sing Softly" - 1981

Side three

1. "I'll Rip Your Spine Out" - 1981
2. "New Orleans" - 1981
3. "Mutually Assured Destruction" - 1981
4. "Unchain Your Brain" - 1980
5. "You're So Right" - 1982
6. "No Laughing In Heaven" - 1981

Side four

1. "Long Gone" - 1982
2. "If You Believe Me" - 1981
3. "Trouble" - 1981
4. "Bluesy Blue Sea" - 1982
5. "Lucille" - 1980

CD

1. "Scarabus"
2. "Money Lender"
3. "Puget Sound"
4. "No Easy Way"
5. "If I Sing Softly"
6. "I'll Rip Your Spine Out"
7. "New Orleans"
8. "Mutually Assured Destruction"
9. "You're So Right"
10. "No Laughing In Heaven"
11. "Long Gone"
12. "If You Believe Me"
13. "Trouble"
14. "Bluesy Blue Sea"
15. "Lucille"

== Personnel ==
- Ian Gillan - lead vocals, harmonica (1978-1982)
- Colin Towns - keyboards (1978-1982)
- Ray Fenwick - guitar, backing vocals (1977)
- Bernie Tormé - guitar (1979-1981)
- Janick Gers - guitar (1981-1982)
- John Gustafson - bass guitar, backing vocals (1977)
- John McCoy - bass guitar (1979-1982)
- Mark Nauseef - drums, backing vocals (1977)
- Mick Underwood - drums (1979-1982)

Production notes

- Compiled by Harris
- Engineered by Steve Smith, Mick Glossop
- Engineered by Paul "Chas" Watkins
- Album digitally re-mastered at Tape One Studios, London
