= Edsall =

Edsall may refer to:

- Edsall (surname), a list of people so named
- Edsall Walker (1910-1997), American pitcher in Negro league baseball
- Edsall-class destroyer escort, a class of US Navy ships built for World War II
  - USS Edsall (DE-129), the lead ship of the class, in commission from 1943 to 1946
- USS Edsall (DD-219), a destroyer in commission from 1920 to 1942
- William S. Edsall House, a historic home in Fort Wayne, Indiana.

== See also ==
- Edsel (disambiguation)
- Wilson C. Edsell (1814-1900), American politician, lawyer and banker
