= Magic (Gillan album) =

Studio album by Gillan
- Released: September 1982
- Recorded: July–August 1982
- Studio: Kingsway (London)
- Genre: Hard rock, heavy metal
- Length: 38:45
- Label: Virgin
- Producer: Mick Glossop

Gillan chronology
Double Trouble (1981)	Magic (1982)

Singles from Magic
- 1. "Living for the City" Released: 20 August 1982; 2. "Long Gone" Released: 29 October 1982

Professional ratings
Review scores
Source	Rating
AllMusic	2.5/5 stars
Collector's Guide to Heavy Metal	10/10

Magic is the sixth and final studio album by English rock band Gillan, released in September 1982. It features eight original songs, mostly co-written by Ian Gillan and Colin Towns, and a cover of Stevie Wonder's 1973 hit single "Living for the City". This cover was released as a 7" single, in both picture-bag and picture-disc editions, and was accompanied by a promotional video.

Although the album was generally accepted by Gillan's staunch UK following, it failed to achieve the chart success of Glory Road or Future Shock, peaking at No. 17 in the UK chart.

Allegedly, many of the album's lyrics cryptically predict the end of the band.

Magic was reissued in 1989 and in 2007 with seven bonus tracks, including cover versions and B-sides.

== Track listing ==
- All songs written by Ian Gillan and Colin Towns except where noted.

Side one

1. "What's the Matter" (Gillan, John McCoy, Janick Gers) – 3:33
2. "Bluesy Blue Sea" (Gillan, Gers) – 4:48
3. "Caught in a Trap" – 3:34
4. "Long Gone" – 3:59
5. "Driving Me Wild" – 3:05

Side two

6. "Demon Driver" – 7:15
7. "Living a Lie" – 4:27
8. "You're So Right" (Gillan, McCoy) – 2:55
9. "Living for the City" (Stevie Wonder) – 4:27
10. "Demon Driver (reprise)" – 0:42

=== 1989 Re-release bonus tracks ===
In 1989 Virgin re-released the album in CD format. The revised track listing was as follows:

11. "Breaking Chains" (Gillan, Gers) – 3:28
12. "Fiji" (Gillan, McCoy) – 5:21
13. "Purple Sky" (Gillan, McCoy) – 3:24
14. "South Africa" (Bernie Marsden) – 4:03
15. "John" (Gillan) – 4:44
16. "South Africa" (12" extended version) (Marsden) – 7:18
17. "Helter Skelter" (John Lennon, Paul McCartney) – 3:26*
18. "Smokestack Lightning" (Chester Burnett) – 4:08*

Total running time 74:50

* Previously unreleased

=== 2007 Re-release bonus tracks ===
In 2007 the album was re-released in CD format again on the Edsel Records label.

11. "Breaking Chains" – 3:28
12. "Purple Sky" – 3:24
13. "Fiji" – 5:21
14. "Helter Skelter" – 3:26
15. "Smokestack Lightning" – 4:08
16. "South Africa" – 4:03
17. "John" – 4:44
18. "South Africa" (12" extended version) – 7:18

== Personnel ==
Gillan

- Ian Gillan – vocals, harmonica, producer on "South Africa"
- Janick Gers – guitar
- Colin Towns – keyboards
- John McCoy – bass guitar
- Mick Underwood – drums

Production

- Mick Glossop – producer, engineer
- Bob Broglia – assistant engineer
- Kingsway Recorders Ltd. – executive producer
- Paul "Chas" Watkins – producer and engineer on "Purple Sky"
- Nick Davis – engineer on "South Africa"
- James "Jimbo" Barton – remix on "South Africa"
- Dave Dragon – illustration
- Bitter & Twisted – design

== Charts ==
=== Album ===
Chart (1982)	Peak position
UK Albums (OCC)	17

=== Singles ===
Living for the City

Chart (1982)	Peak position
UK Singles (OCC)	50
