= Guy McCoy Tormé =

- Origin: UK
- Genres: Hard rock, Heavy metal, Punk rock
- Years active: 2006–2019
- Members: Robin Guy; John McCoy; Bernie Tormé

Guy McCoy Tormé (also known by its initials, GMT) is a British rock band, formed by Robin Guy and former Gillan members John McCoy and Bernie Tormé.

== Career ==
In 2005, Bernie Tormé and John McCoy reunited with the idea of forming a new band, taking advantage of successful sales of the Gillan material published by Angel Air Records between 1997 and 2000.

In 2006, with the release of Gillan's Live – Edinburgh 1980 DVD, an extra video clip for the song "Cannonball" made by GMT marked the start of the group. This was followed by a debut three-track EP called Cannonball, released on 21 August 2006. The band then released its first album, Bitter & Twisted.

In 2007, GMT toured widely throughout the UK, including the RBCS 2007 Rock and Blues Festival in Pentrich. The following year, on 17 November 2008 GMT released Evil Twin, their second album, with Dee Snider performing as a guest vocalist.

Between 2009 and 2011, GMT performed various shows, finally releasing their first live album Raw – Live in 2011.

=== Hiatus ===
In late 2011, due to John McCoy's health problems, the band went on hiatus. Meanwhile, Bernie Tormé recorded and toured again as a solo act, accompanied by Chris Heilmann on bass guitar and with various drummers, including Ian Harris, and featuring Bernie's son Eric at a number of shows.

John McCoy worked with Tyla Gang in 2012, and Robin Guy continued to work with other artists, including Tatiana DeMaria.

Bernie Tormé died on 17 March 2019, and Robin Guy died on 13 September 2024.

== Personnel ==
- Bernie Tormé – Guitar and vocals
- John McCoy – Bass
- Robin Guy – drums and percussion

== Discography ==
- Cannonball (2006, EP)
- Bitter & Twisted (2006)
- Evil Twin (2008)
- Raw – Live (2011)
