= Double Trouble (Gillan album) =

Studio album by Gillan
- Released: 30 October 1981
- Recorded: August 1981 (studio)
- Venue: Reading Festival, 29 August 1981; Rainbow Theatre, London, UK, 4 March 1981
- Studio: Kingsway Recorders, London, UK
- Genre: Hard rock, heavy metal
- Length: 77:06
- Label: Virgin
- Producer: Steve Smith for K.R. Productions Ltd.

Gillan chronology
Future Shock (1981)	Double Trouble (1981)	Magic (1982)

Singles from Double Trouble
- 1. "Nightmare" Released: 2 October 1981; 2. "Restless" Released: 8 January 1982

Professional ratings
Review scores
Source	Rating
AllMusic	2/5 stars
Collector's Guide to Heavy Metal	10/10

Double Trouble is the fifth studio album by the British hard rock band Gillan, released in 1981. It was released as a double album, the first disc containing studio material, and the second containing live recordings. The production of the new material was consciously radio friendly and more US-oriented, which Gillan himself was uncertain about in interviews. But it reached No. 12 in the UK charts. It is the first album to feature Janick Gers, Bernie Tormé having left the group during the tour of Germany in 1981. Gers came in for the rest of the tour, his first show being on 25 June 1981.

In 1989, Virgin issued the album in CD format, with the same track listing. In 2007, Edsel Demon Music Group released the album with bonus material.

"Nightmare" was covered by Lionheart on their 1984 album, Hot Tonight.

== Track listing ==
=== Studio LP ===
Side one

1. "I'll Rip Your Spine Out" (Ian Gillan, John McCoy, Mick Underwood) – 4:30
2. "Restless" (Gillan, McCoy) – 3:19
3. "Men of War" (Gillan, McCoy) – 4:31
4. "Sunbeam" (Gillan, Janick Gers, McCoy, Underwood) – 5:11

Side two

5. "Nightmare" (Colin Towns) – 3:15
6. "Hadely Bop Bop" (Gillan, McCoy) – 2:50
7. "Life Goes On" (Gillan, Towns) – 4:12
8. "Born to Kill" (Gillan, Towns) – 9:28

=== Live LP ===
Side one

1. "No Laughing in Heaven" (Gillan, McCoy, Bernie Tormé, Underwood) – 6:26
2. "No Easy Way" (Gillan, McCoy, Tormé) – 10:32
3. "Trouble" (Leiber, Stoller) – 3:04

Side two

4. "Mutually Assured Destruction" (Gillan, McCoy, Tormé, Towns, Underwood) – 5:13
5. "If You Believe Me" (Gillan, McCoy, Tormé, Underwood) – 8:26*
6. "New Orleans" (Frank Guida, Joseph Royster) – 6:03

Live tracks recorded at Reading Festival on 29 August 1981, except for * which was recorded at the Rainbow Theatre on 4 March 1981. This track is the only one on the album which features former guitarist Bernie Tormé.

=== 2007 Re-release bonus tracks ===
Disc one - Studio

9. "Spanish Guitar" (Gillan, Towns) – 3:24

Disc two - Live

7. "Bite the Bullet" (Gillan, Towns) – 5:20
8. "On the Rocks" (Gillan, Towns) – 6:32
9. "Mr. Universe" (Gillan, Towns) – 7:13**
10. "Vengeance" (Gillan, Towns) – 4:26**
11. "Smoke on the Water" (Ritchie Blackmore, Gillan, Roger Glover, Jon Lord, Ian Paice) – 8:55**

Live tracks recorded at Reading Festival on 29 August 1981

** Recorded at the Reading Festival 22 August 1980

The 2007 re-issue live bonus tracks originally appeared on the 1989 Virgin Records CD release of the Mr. Universe album

== Personnel ==
Gillan

- Ian Gillan – lead vocals
- Janick Gers – guitars (on all studio tracks and live tracks 1–4 and 6–8)
- Bernie Tormé – guitars (on live tracks 5 and 9–11)
- John McCoy – bass
- Colin Towns – keyboards
- Mick Underwood – drums

Production

- Steve Smith – producer, live tracks engineer on the Rolling Stones Mobile Studio
- Paul "Chas" Watkins – studio tracks engineer, mixing at Abbey Road Studios, London
- Mike McKenna – live tracks engineer on the Rolling Stones Mobile Studio
- Chris Blake – live track 5 engineer on the Manor Mobile Studio

== Charts ==
=== Album ===
Chart (1981–1982)	Peak position
UK Albums (Official Charts)	12

Chart (2007)	Peak position
UK Independent Albums (Official Charts)	30

=== Singles ===
Nightmare

Chart (1981)	Peak position
UK Singles (Official Charts)	36

Restless

Chart (1982)	Peak position
UK Singles (Official Charts)	25
