= Mr. Universe (album) =

Studio album by Gillan
- Released: 12 October 1979
- Recorded: June–July 1979
- Studio: Kingsway Recorders, London, UK
- Genre: Hard rock, heavy metal
- Length: 44:19
- Label: Acrobat (UK); Eastworld (Japan); Interfusion (Australia)
- Producer: Paul "Chas" Watkins, Ian Gillan, Colin Towns, John McCoy

Gillan chronology
| Gillan (1978) | Mr. Universe (1979) | Glory Road (1980) |

Singles from Mr. Universe
- 1. "Vengeance" Released: 5 October 1979

Alternative cover
- Cover of the Japanese release

Audio sample
- "Secret of the Dance"; This sample from the album clearly demonstrates the band's dramatic departure from the jazz-rock fusion sound of the Ian Gillan Band: file; help

Professional ratings
Review scores
| Source | Rating |
|---|---|
| AllMusic | 4/5 stars |
| Collector's Guide to Heavy Metal | 10/10 |

Mr. Universe is the second studio album by the British hard rock band Gillan, and the first with the classic line-up with Ian Gillan, Colin Towns, John McCoy, Bernie Tormé and Mick Underwood. Released in October 1979. The album reached No. 11 in the UK Albums Chart, and sold over 2 million copies worldwide.

Mr. Universe features several songs also on the band's previous album, Gillan: "Secret of the Dance," "Roller," "Vengeance," "Dead of Night," "Message in a Bottle," and "Fighting Man." Along with these, "Street Theatre," "Move with the Times," and "Sleeping on the Job," from the alternate version of Mr. Universe also originally appeared on Gillan. These versions range from slightly different to complete re-recordings

== Track listing ==
All songs written by Ian Gillan and Colin Towns except where noted.

Side One
| No. | Title | Writer(s) | Length |
|---|---|---|---|
| 1. | "Second Sight" | Towns | 2:33 |
| 2. | "Secret of the Dance" | | 2:54 |
| 3. | "She Tears Me Down" | Towns | 5:07 |
| 4. | "Roller" | | 4:43 |
| 5. | "Mr. Universe" | | 6:14 |

Side Two
| No. | Title | Writer(s) | Length |
|---|---|---|---|
| 6. | "Vengeance" | | 3:34 |
| 7. | "Puget Sound" | Gillan, Towns, John McCoy, Bernie Tormé, Mick Underwood | 4:23 |
| 8. | "Dead of Night" | | 4:04 |
| 9. | "Message in a Bottle" | | 3:09 |
| 10. | "Fighting Man" | | 7:28 |

=== Alternate version ===
An alternate album also called Mr. Universe was released on September 20, 1979 in Japan by Toshiba-EMI's (Eastworld) billed as Ian Gillan as opposed to "Gillan" and later in the year in Australia (Interfusion) and New Zealand (Parlophone). This release contained several tracks that were not on the version as above.

Side one

1. "Vengeance" – 3:34
2. "Mr. Universe" – 6:14
3. "She Tears Me Down" – 5:08
4. "Your Sister's on My List" – 4:09***

Side two

"Street Theatre" (Towns) – 2:42*
1. "Roller" – 4:37
2. "Puget Sound" – 4:26
3. "Move with the Times" (Gillan, Towns, McCoy) – 5:00*
4. "Sleeping on the Job" – 3:34**

Total running time 39:24

* These appear on the 1993 RPM release Gillan – The Japanese Album, see Gillan
** This version has not yet been released on CD
***Used as a B-side to the UK "Trouble" single and appears on the first release of Future Shock on CD as a bonus track

=== 1989 re-release bonus tracks ===
In 1989 the album was re-released on CD by Virgin Records, produced by Ian Gillan and Paul "Chas" Watkins, and mixed by John McCoy and Watkins. It followed the original UK track listing and included six bonus tracks:

11. "On the Rocks" (live) – 6:38**
12. "Bite the Bullet" (live) – 5:38**
13. "Mr. Universe" (live) – 7:20***
14. "Vengeance" (live) – 4:42***
15. "Smoke on the Water" (live) (Ritchie Blackmore, Gillan, Roger Glover, Jon Lord, Ian Paice) – 10:10***
16. "Lucille" (live) (Richard Wayne Penniman, Albert Collins) – 2:32****

Total running time 80:02

** Recorded at the Reading Festival, 29 August 1981

*** Recorded at the Reading Festival, 22 August 1980

**** Recorded at Nottingham Rock City, 4 March 1981, previously unreleased, in 2009 was included on Live: Triple Trouble album

Tracks 11 - 15 appear as live bonus tracks on the 2007 Edsel Demon Music Group re-issue of Double Trouble

=== 2007 re-release bonus track ===
In 2007, the album was re-released in remastered format with new sleevenotes by Ian Gillan by Demon Music Group and one bonus track:

11. "Smoke on the Water" (live at Kingsway Recorders) – 8:25

Total running time 52:34

== Personnel ==
Gillan

- Ian Gillan – vocals, harmonica, producer
- Bernie Tormé – guitar
- Colin Towns – keyboards, flute, producer
- John McCoy – bass, producer
- Mick Underwood – drums, percussion

additional track from The Japanese album

- Ian Gillan – vocals, production
- Steve Byrd – guitars
- Colin Towns – keyboards, flutes, arrangement, production
- John McCoy – bass
- Liam Genockey – drums, percussion (on the album)

Production

- Paul "Chas" Watkins – producer, engineer
- George Peckham – mastering

== Charts ==
| Chart (1979) | Peak position |
|---|---|
| UK Albums (OCC) | 11 |

| Chart (2007) | Peak position |
|---|---|
| UK Independent Albums (OCC) | 33 |
