= Gillan (album) =

Studio album by Gillan
- Released: September 1978 (Japan)
- Recorded: July – August 1978
- Studio: Kingsway Recorders, London, UK
- Genre: Hard rock, heavy metal
- Length: 42:56
- Label: Eastworld (Japan and New Zealand); Interfusion (Australia)
- Producer: Paul "Chas" Watkins, Ian Gillan, Colin Towns

Gillan chronology
Gillan (1978)	Mr. Universe (1979)

Professional ratings
Review scores
Source	Rating
AllMusic	3/5 stars
Collector's Guide to Heavy Metal	8/10

Gillan is the debut studio album by British hard rock band Gillan, released in September 1978 only in Japan then later in Australia and New Zealand. Although not released domestically in the UK, the album sold well as an import, aided by positive press reviews. The sleeve notes of the original release credit Liam Genocky as playing drums and percussion, while the 1993 release "Gillan – The Japanese Album" instead credits Pete Barnacle.

== Track listings ==
All songs written by Ian Gillan and Colin Towns except where noted.

Side one

1. "Second Sight" (Colin Towns) – 2:36*
2. "Secret of the Dance" – 2:50**
3. "I'm Your Man" – 4:25
4. "Dead of Night" – 4:10**
5. "Fighting Man" (Towns) – 7:35*

Side two

6. "Message in a Bottle" – 3:08**
7. "Not Weird Enough" – 4:05
8. "Bringing Joanna Back" – 3:39
9. "Abbey of Thelema" – 4:56
10. "Back in the Game" – 5:25

* These appear on the standard UK LP and CD formats of the Mr. Universe album

** Different versions from those on the standard UK LP and CD formats of the Mr. Universe album

=== CD reissue ===
In 1993 an album combining tracks from the Japan/Australia/New Zealand version of the Gillan and the Mr. Universe was released in CD format by the RPM record label under the title "Gillan – The Japanese Album". The revised track listing was as follows:

1. "Street Theatre" (Towns) – 2:40 (instrumental)*
2. "Secret of the Dance" – 2:51
3. "I'm Your Man" – 4:25
4. "Dead of Night" – 4:11
5. "Fighting Man" (Towns) – 7:37
6. "Message in a Bottle" – 3:11
7. "Not Weird Enough" – 3:51
8. "Bringing Joanna Back" – 3:41
9. "Abbey of Thelema" – 4:57
10. "Back in the Game" – 5:28
11. "Vengeance" – 3:30**
12. "Move with the Times" (Gillan, Towns, John McCoy) – 5:02*
13. "Sleeping on the Job" – 3:12**
14. "Roller" – 4:06**

Total running time 58:43

* from the Japanese/Australian/New Zealand version of Mr. Universe LP
** previously unreleased version of tracks from Mr. Universe (UK) LP
There is another 'lost' song from Mr. Universe recording sessions: "Parliament Square"

== Personnel ==
- Ian Gillan – vocals, production
- Steve Byrd – guitars
- Colin Towns – keyboards, flutes, arrangement, production
- John McCoy – bass
- Liam Genockey – drums, percussion (on the album)
- Pete Barnacle – drums, percussion (live shows)
