= Glory Road (Gillan album) =

Studio album by Gillan
- Released: 8 August 1980
- Recorded: April–May 1980
- Studio: Kingsway Recorders, London, UK
- Genre: Hard rock, heavy metal
- Length: 43:26
- Label: Virgin
- Producer: Gillan, John McCoy, Paul "Chas" Watkins

Gillan chronology
Mr. Universe (1979)	Glory Road (1980)	Future Shock (1981)

Singles from Glory Road
- 1. "Sleeping on the Job" Released: 6 June 1980; 2. "No Easy Way" Released: 25 July 1980

Audio sample
- "On the Rocks": file; help

Professional ratings
Review scores
Source	Rating
AllMusic	3/5 stars
Collector's Guide to Heavy Metal	9/10 (Glory Road)
Collector's Guide to Heavy Metal	6/10 (For Gillan Fans Only)

Glory Road is the third studio album by the British hard rock band Gillan, released on 8 August 1980. The album reached No. 3 in the UK album charts.

== Track summary ==
The US version of the album had a slightly different running order and included "Your Mother Was Right" instead of "Sleeping on the Job". The song "Unchain Your Brain" was re-recorded and released on Ian Gillan's 2006 release Gillan's Inn.

Glory Road was also released in the UK as a limited edition double LP and contained the free LP For Gillan Fans Only. When Glory Road was eventually released on CD, most of the For Gillan Fans Only material was included as bonus tracks. However, "Higher and Higher", "Egg Timer" (a spoof of Samson's "Vice Versa" from the Head On album) and "Harry Lime Theme" failed to make it to CD until the two-CD 2007 Edsel Records remaster, which contains both the album and the whole of For Gillan Fans Only. This latter release also has retrospective comments by Ian Gillan and the original artwork, plus pictures of various single covers. A different version of "Trying to Get to You" can be heard on Ian Gillan's album Cherkazoo and Other Stories.

== Track listings ==
All songs written by Ian Gillan, Bernie Tormé and John McCoy, except where noted.

=== Glory Road ===
Side one

1. "Unchain Your Brain" – 3:11
2. "Are You Sure?" – 4:05
3. "Time and Again" – 5:05
4. "No Easy Way" – 6:34
5. "Sleeping on the Job" (Gillan, Colin Towns) – 3:11

Side two

6. "On the Rocks" (Gillan, Towns) – 6:39
7. "If You Believe Me" (Gillan, McCoy, Tormé, Mick Underwood) – 7:33
8. "Running, White Face, City Boy" (Towns) – 3:11
9. "Nervous" (Gillan, Towns) – 3:44

=== For Gillan Fans Only ===
Side one

1. "Higher and Higher" – 3:42
2. "Your Mother Was Right" (Gillan, Towns) – 7:23
3. "Redwatch" (Tormé, Underwood) – 3:42
4. "Abbey of Thelema" (Gillan, Towns) – 6:06
5. "Trying to Get to You" (Rose Marie McCoy, Charles Singleton) – 3:17

Side two

6. "Come Tomorrow" (McCoy, Tormé) – 2:52
7. "Dragon's Tongue" (Towns) – 5:32
8. "Post-Fade Brain Damage" – 6:03
9. "Egg Timer (Vice Versa)" (Paul Samson, Thunderstick, Chris Aylmer, Bruce Bruce) – 7:11
10. "Harry Lime Theme" (Anton Karas) – 9:27

=== 1989 Re-release ===
In 1989 the album was released in CD format again on the Virgin label, with some tracks from For Gillan Fans Only.

1. "Unchain Your Brain" – 3:11
2. "Are You Sure?" – 4:05
3. "Time and Again" – 5:05
4. "No Easy Way" – 6:34
5. "Sleeping on the Job" – 3:11
6. "On the Rocks" – 6:39
7. "If You Believe Me" – 7:33
8. "Running, White Face, City Boy" – 3:11
9. "Nervous" – 3:44
10. "Your Mother Was Right" – 7:23
11. "Redwatch" – 3:42
12. "Abbey of Thelema" – 6:06
13. "Trying to Get to You" – 3:17
14. "Come Tomorrow" – 2:52
15. "Dragon's Tongue" – 5:32
16. "Post-Fade Brain Damage" – 6:03
- Total running time 78:23

=== 2007 Re-release ===
In 2007 the full 19-track double album was rereleased in two-CD format on the Edsel label. The For Gillan Fans Only CD has two bonus tracks:

11. "Handles on Her Hips" – 2:09
12. "I Might As Well Go Home (Mystic)" (Gillan, Towns) – 2:19

== Personnel ==
Gillan

- Ian Gillan – vocals, harmonica
- Bernie Tormé – guitar, lead vocals on "Come Tomorrow"
- Colin Towns – keyboards, flute, lead vocals on "Egg Timer" (Vice Versa)
- John McCoy – bass guitar, producer, mixing
- Mick Underwood – drums

Production

- Gillan – producer, arrangements
- Paul "Chas" Watkins – producer, engineer, mixing
- Kingsway Recorders Ltd. – executive producer
- Cooke Key – sleeve design

== Charts ==
=== Album ===
Chart (1980–1981)	Peak position
UK Albums (Official Charts)	3
US Billboard 200	183

Chart (2007)	Peak position
UK Independent Albums (Official Charts)	31

=== Singles ===
Sleeping on the Job

Chart (1980)	Peak position
UK Singles (Official Charts)	55

== Certifications ==
Region	Certification	Certified units/sales
United Kingdom (BPI)	Silver	60,000^{^}
^{^} Shipments figures based on certification alone.
