= The Early Years (band) =

British rock band

- Origin: Hackney, London, England
- Genres: Alternative rock; Krautrock; Electronic; Shoegazing
- Years active: 2004–present
- Labels: Beggars Banquet; Sonic Cathedral
- Members: David Malkinson; Roger Mackin; Brendan Kersey; Philip Raines; Alexander Theakston

The Early Years are an English rock band from Hackney, London, England, consisting of David Malkinson, Roger Mackin, Brendan Kersey, Philip Raines and Alexander Theakston.

== Biography ==
The band came together as a three piece in 2004 through a mutual love of German krautrock, early electronica, art rock, noise and psychedelia. Other shared influences encompassed elements of noise, repetition, sonics and song which became key elements in The Early Years sound. The band were initially championed by Radio 1 DJs Steve Lamacq and Huw Stephens and XFM's John Kennedy, and subsequent radio play brought them to the attention of Beggars Banquet Records. After signing a three-album deal in late 2005, the band released three EPs and their self-titled debut album, all to critical acclaim.

Pitchfork reviewer Adam Moerder gave the album a rating of 6.4 and stated, "By album's end, however, Early Years makes sure to leave a wistful taste in your mouth."

Following their debut album release in 2006, Kersey joined on bass to bolster their live sound and they embarked on numerous UK tours and performed at festivals including ), Bestival, Truck and Standon Calling. They recorded various live sessions for Radio 1 and XFM, and toured Europe and the United States including a string of shows in New York and a number of performances at the South By Southwest festival in Austin, Texas.

The band went on hiatus in 2008, after which various members recorded two further albums, both of which remain incomplete and unreleased. The full band reformed in 2011 with a new double A-side single "Complicity" / "Fallen Star" on Sonic Cathedral and a concert in London. Marc Riley invited the band in for a live session on his BBC 6Music show and Paul Weller – on hearing the band's latest disc – asked them to remix tracks from his kraut-infused album Sonik Kicks. Later that year the band were invited to perform at the inaugural Festival Number 6 in Portmerion, North Wales. In 2014, they performed at the Liverpool International Festival of Psychedelia and the 100 Club in London, releasing a limited edition of 100 cassettes to coincide with the 100 Club show.

The band released their second album – simply titled II – in September 2016, ten years after their debut. Self-recorded and self-produced at home in London and Cheshire, it was mixed at Abbey Road Studios. It was released on Sonic Cathedral Records on Double LP, CD and Digital formats earning widespread critical acclaim, with Shindig Magazine hailing it 'a classic from the first track to the last'. The band were invited back to play at the Liverpool International Festival of Psychedelia and a small UK tour was performed in November 2016.

2017 saw the band make festival appearances at Standon Calling in Hertfordshire, Bluedot at Jodrell Bank and Bristol's Simple Things festival as well as a one off London Show to promote the release of their Remixes EP. After helping the band tour album II, musician Mylar Melodies joined the band as a full-time member at the start of 2018.

== Discography ==
=== Albums ===
- The Early Years (Beggars Banquet, 2006)
- Live / The 100 Club (Sonic Cathedral, 2014)
- II (Sonic Cathedral, 2016)
- Modern Moonlight (2026)
