= Edsall (surname) =

Edsall is the surname of:

- James K. Edsall (1831−1892), American politician
- John Tileston Edsall (1902−2002), an early protein scientist
- Joseph E. Edsall (1789−1865), American politician
- Norman Edsall (1873−1899), US Navy sailor
- Randy Edsall (born 1958), American college football head coach
- Samuel Cook Edsall (1860−1917), American Episcopal bishop
- Thomas B. Edsall (born 1941), American journalist and academic
