= William S. Edsall House =

Historic house in Indiana, United States

- U.S. National Register of Historic Places
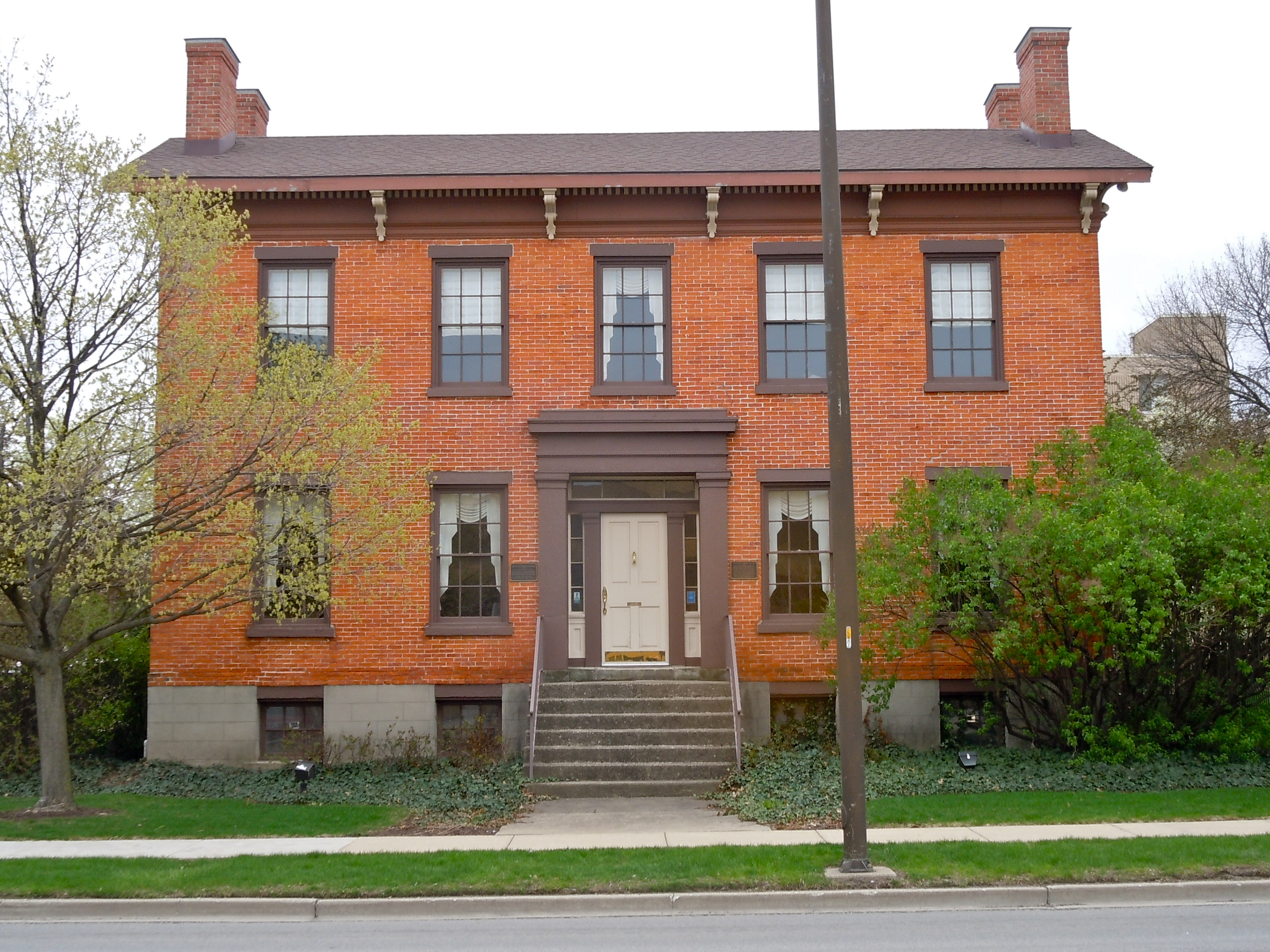
- William S. Edsall House, April 2011

- Location within Indiana Location within the United States
- Location: 305 W. Main St., Fort Wayne, Indiana
- Coordinates: 41°4′46″N 85°8′38″W
- Area: 1 acre (0.40 ha)
- Built: 1839-1840
- Architectural style: Greek Revival, Federal
- NRHP reference No.: 76000032
- Added to NRHP: October 8, 1976

William S. Edsall House is a historic home located at Fort Wayne, Indiana. It was built in 1839–1840, and is a two-story, five-bay, transitional Federal / Greek Revival style brick dwelling. It measures 44 feet wide and 20 feet deep, sits on a raised basement, and has four interior end chimneys.

The home is named for its original owner, William S. Edsall (1809–1876). Edsall worked as a fur trader, miller, contractor, and surveyor for the Wabash and Erie Canal. He was also prominent in local politics. He served on Fort Wayne's first Common Council. Later, he served as register of the city's U.S. land office and as Allen County Clerk.

It was listed on the National Register of Historic Places in 1976.
