= Baby Fox =

Trip hop band

Baby Fox were a 1990s British trip hop band made up of members Christine Ann Leach, Alex Gray and Dwight Clarke. They produced two albums.

== Discography ==
- A Normal Family (1996)
  - Tracks:
1. Johnny Lipshake
2. Celebrate
3. Curlylocks
4. Ladybird
5. Alienway
6. A Normal Family
7. Girl
8. Black Twister
9. In Your Dreams
10. Our Face Is Not A Jackal
11. Za Za (Get Ready)
12. Gloria Graham
13. Rain (In Memory Of Rain)
- Dum Dum Baby (1998)
  - Tracks:
1. Dum Dum Baby
2. Heaven's Gate
3. The Rookery, Pt. 1
4. The Rookery, Pt. 2
5. Nearly Beautiful
6. Zodiac
7. Bad Girl Love
8. Bluebird - co-writer: Tennessee Williams
9. Fury to Forgiveness
10. Rainy London Sunday
11. Hallow'een
12. Still Point
13. That's the Way It Is - written by and ft. Christine Leach
14. The Line's Cleared
15. Naked Hour
