= Mick Underwood =

English drummer (1945–2024)

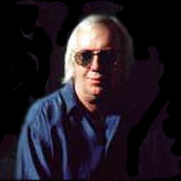

Background information
- Born: Michael John Underwood; 5 September 1945; Middlesex, England
- Died: 28 July 2024 (aged 78)
- Genres: Hard rock; blues rock; heavy metal; progressive rock
- Occupations: Musician, songwriter, producer
- Instruments: Drums
- Years active: 1961–2020
- Formerly of: The Outlaws; The Herd; Episode Six; Quatermass; Gillan
- Website: mickunderwoodsgloryroad.com

Michael John Underwood (5 September 1945 – 28 July 2024) was an English drummer. He first played drums at the age of 14 and was a professional musician by the time he left school.

Underwood collaborated with a number of notable musicians and groups, including Jet Harris, the Outlaws (with Ritchie Blackmore), the Herd (with Peter Frampton), Episode Six (with Ian Gillan and Roger Glover), Quatermass (with John Gustafson), and Gillan (again with Gillan). He was also the drummer for Mick Underwood's Glory Road and Raw Glory.

== Early life ==
Underwood was born in Middlesex on 5 September 1945. At the age of 14 he was given his first drum, a second-hand snare drum, and added a third-hand bass drum shortly after. He received drum tuition from Jim Marshall, who went on to become the inventor and manufacturer of the Marshall amplifier. During this period, Underwood met Ritchie Blackmore (then known as Ricky Blackmore) and the two played together in a band called the Dominators, although Underwood was eventually asked to leave the band for "...playing too loud!"

Underwood's next band was the Satellites, until he was invited to join the Crescents, who were playing residencies at large ballrooms. Underwood left school at 16 to work with Jet Harris, and joined a tour of Britain with Sam Cooke and Little Richard. It was at the end of this tour that Screaming Lord Sutch (in whose band, the Savages, Blackmore now played) suggested he approach the independent record producer Joe Meek for further session work.

== Career ==
=== 1963–1965 ===
Meek's studio, RGM Sound, was based in North London, where he used a band called the Outlaws as his permanent studio musicians, also allowing them to record material under their own name. When Underwood arrived to audition for Meek, the Outlaws were also recruiting for a lead guitarist and it was Underwood who suggested Ritchie Blackmore should fill the role, an invitation he duly accepted.

Between January 1963 and June 1965, the Outlaws released six singles, as well as playing on hundreds of Meek's recording sessions with various artists. They also headlined at the Star-Club in Hamburg with both Jerry Lee Lewis and Gene Vincent. In 1964, they appeared in the movie Live It Up!, performing their single "Law & Order", mislabelled "Law and Disorder" on the end screen credits.

A reviewer of Underwood's work at this time described his drumming style as "...coupling Charlie Watts type steadiness with little Jim McCarty style flourishes." Blackmore eventually moved to another of Meeks' bands, joining Heinz Burt's backing band the Wild Boys, but he and Underwood still collaborated in recording sessions with Meek's engineer Derek Lawrence. One of the Derek Lawrence sessions produced Blackmore's first official release, the now highly sought-after single "Get Away" / "Little Brown Jug", released in July 1965. They also recorded "Earthshaker" and "Satan's Holiday, " which were released on the Titan label, credited to the Lancasters. "Satan's Holiday" was a fast, rock adaptation of Grieg's "In the Hall of the Mountain King", a tune that stayed in Blackmore's stage repertory right into the 1990s. Shortly afterwards, Underwood also left the Outlaws to take up an offer to join the Herd.

=== 1965–1968 ===
With the Herd, Underwood began playing at all the major venues on the circuit, such as the Marquee Club and Eel Pie Island. Despite their busy schedule and the release of three singles, Underwood grew increasingly frustrated at the band's lack of success, and in 1966 he resigned from the band and the music business. A year later he accepted an invitation from singer James Royal as a session drummer for a two-week residency at Hatchets in London's West End. At the end of the residency, Underwood decided to stay with the band, the James Royal Set to tour with Johnny Cash.

At the end of this tour, Underwood spoke with Peter Grant, whom he knew from the time that Grant had been tour manager for Gene Vincent when the Outlaws had been his backing band. Grant explained that he was currently working with guitarist Jimmy Page, and was recruiting musicians to form a new band around him. Underwood considered the offer, but instead accepted one to join established act Episode Six. Grant had asked one of his other acts, singer Terry Reid, to join the project, who had also turned down the offer. Undeterred, Grant went on to recruit two previously unknown musicians, the singer Robert Plant and drummer John Bonham, and the band became Led Zeppelin.

Underwood joined ex-the Authentics frontman Henry Turtle in psychedelic rock outfit the Doves from 1967 to 1968 alongside former the Herd guitarist Terry Clark plus Brian Curtis, Ian McGlynn, and Harvey Hinsley (formerly of the Outlaws and later a member of Hot Chocolate). Underwood departed in July 1968 after EMI declined to release intended single She's Not There, with Decca having done the same with the band's planned debut single, Smokeytime, Springtime, the previous autumn.

=== 1968–1970 ===
Roger Glover, bass player for Episode Six, said of their new drummer: "Mick represented a step up for us because he had been around in other bands. The Herd had one fairly big hit so it was as if we had been connected with success." Also in the band was singer Ian Gillan.

Despite numerous BBC sessions and two singles, commercial success never came for the band and there was a feeling that they were failing to move with the times as the music scene rapidly changed at the close of the 1960s. Along with Gillan, Underwood was drawn to the heavier sound of the emergent new bands, in particular Deep Purple (Ritchie Blackmore's new band) and Led Zeppelin. When Blackmore contacted Underwood for a recommendation for a singer, he immediately gave them Gillan's name. Along with Jon Lord, Blackmore attended an Episode Six gig to listen to Gillan, and shortly afterwards recruited both him and Roger Glover into Deep Purple. Following this shake-up, bassist/singer John Gustafson and keyboard player Pete Robinson were called in to shore up the band, but shortly afterwards the two newcomers left, along with Underwood, to form their own band, Quatermass.

=== 1970–1979 ===
After several showcase gigs, Quatermass were signed by George Martin's Air London company and began to put together their first album, using their own material plus several songs written by Steve Hammond. Recorded at EMI's Abbey Road Studios the band's eponymous album was released on EMI's progressive rock label Harvest Records. One of the Hammond tracks on the album was titled "Black Sheep of the Family", later covered by Blackmore on the first Rainbow album. To promote the album the band undertook a European tour, with performances on radio and TV timed to coincide with the release of the album in various countries. Despite wide critical acclaim, the project had insufficient financial backing however, and there were many problems on their subsequent tour of the United States. On their return to the UK the band dissolved.

In the summer of 1971, Underwood began discussions with Paul Rodgers who was looking to form a new band after the initial break up of Free, and along with bass player Stuart McDonald they formed the band Peace. Signed to Island Records, Peace began to write and record material for a debut album and also embarked on a UK tour supporting Mott the Hoople but in January 1972 Free reformed, and Underwood formed another new band, called Sammy.

It was around this time that Underwood was offered the position of drummer with Hot Chocolate but he declined and successfully recommended Tony Connor – who had recently left Audience – for a position which was then held, temporarily, by session drummer Cozy Powell.

Underwood called on Gillan to produce their first single, and the band then went into rehearsals for their debut album, which was then recorded in a single 72-hour session. As in previous projects, there was little commercial success and Underwood dissolved the band, returning to session drumming.

His next band was Strapps. Their eponymous debut album was recorded in 1976 at Ian Gillan's Kingsway Recorders studio in London, produced by former Episode Six colleague Roger Glover. They then toured as support act on Deep Purple's tour of the UK, and went on to release three further albums.

Underwood worked again with Gillan as the support act on the UK tour of the Ian Gillan Band, whose line-up included former Quatermass colleague John Gustafson, on bass and backing vocals. Underwood sometimes took the opportunity to view the show from within the audience after playing his own set, and recalled that he "really picked up this bewildered vibe. The fans just couldn't connect with the music, however well it was played."

Strapps fourth and final album Ball of Fire was recorded at Ian Gillan's Kingsway studios and during recording Underwood was asked by Gillan if he could use a couple of hours of their studio time to lay down a vocal with his latest band, Gillan. Several weeks later Gillan invited him to be the drummer in this new venture.

=== 1979–1982 ===
Former Deep Purple drummer Ian Paice had also auditioned for Gillan but according to guitarist Bernie Torme "...he had some difficulty after playing "Secret of the Dance" due to his only having one lung, and being a bit out of practice. He played it brilliantly but he had to lie down on the floor for five minutes afterwards. He did not want to join because of our fast tracks, he said he no longer wanted to play stuff like that. I think the fact that he had been offered to join Whitesnake with his old friend Jon Lord made a big difference. Meeting Gillan again at the studio had obviously put Underwood's name on the list of potentials for the job, and as Torme revealed "...we finally found the magnificently solid and under-appreciated Mick Underwood. The day after he accepted the job, Underwood and the band began to record the Mr. Universe album, released in October 1979.

=== 2006 onwards ===
In 2006, Underwood along with bassist Johnny Heywood and former Heavy Metal Kids guitarist Cosmo Verrico formed the band Raw Glory, who released an album, City Life in 2007. In 2012, he formed Mick Underwood's Glory Road, initially with Rob Cooksley as the singer (followed by Paul Manzi, who also sang with Raw Glory), Jeff Summers on guitar, Gary Summers on bass and backing vocals, and Roy Shipston on keyboards, performing songs from the Gillan era.

In 2023, it was announced on Underwood's "Glory Road" Facebook page that he had "mixed dementia" and would no longer be contributing to the page.

A memorial concert for Mick Underwood was arranged at The Cavern in Raynes Park, London on 18 April 2025, featuring members of his former bands, with all proceeds going to charity.

== Illness and death ==
In August 2023, Underwood's wife Sue stated that he was battling dementia.

Underwood died on 28 July 2024, at the age of 78.

== Discography ==
"Redwatch"
A sample of Underwood's distinctive style taken from his 1980 "Earthquake at the Savoy" release— 577 KB

Underwood performed as a session musician on hundreds of recordings, and much of his catalogue of later works has been reissued on retrospective compilations of other artists' works. This discography covers the work of Underwood in his own bands."

- With the Outlaws
  - "Poppin' (Part 1.)" / "Poppin' (Part Two)" (Released as The Chaps) (single) (1962)
  - "The Return of the Outlaws" / "Texan Spiritual" (single) (1963)
  - "That Set the Wild West Free" / "Hobo" (single) (1963) note : Underwood does not play on "Hobo")
  - "Law and Order" / "Do-Da-Day" (single) (1963)
  - "Keep a Knockin'" / "Shake with Me" (single) (1964)
  - "Only for You" / "Don't Cry" (single) (1965)
  - The Outlaws Ride Again (retrospective compilation album) (1990)
- With the Herd
  - "She Was Really Saying Something" / "Here Comes the Fool" (single) (1965)
  - "So Much in Love" / "This Boy's Always Been True" (single) (1966)
- With Episode Six
  - "Lucky Sunday" / "Mr Universe" (single) (1968)
  - "Mozart Versus the Rest" / "Jack D'Or" (single) (1969)
- With Quatermass
  - "One Blind Mice" / "Punting" (single) (1970)
  - "Black Sheep of the Family" / "Good Lord Knows" (single) (1970)
  - "Gemini" / "Black Sheep of the Family" (single) (1971)
  - Quatermass (1970)
- With Peace
  - The Free Story (album) (1973) – Underwood performs on the track "Lady"
  - Live at the BBC – (22 December 1971)
- With Sammy
  - "Goo Ger Woogie" / "Big Lovin' Woman" (single) (1972)
  - "Sioux Eyed Lady" / "70 Days" (single) (1972)
  - Sammy (1972)
- With Graham Bonnet
  - No Bad Habits (1976)
- With Strapps
  - "All Thru the Night" / "Understand It" (single) (1977)
  - "In Your Ear" / "Rita B" (single) (1977)
  - "Child of the City" / "Soft Touch" (single) (1978)
  - "Turn Out Alright" / "Take It Break It" (single) (1978)
  - Strapps (1976)
  - Secret Damage (1977)
  - Prisoner of Your Love (1978)
  - Ball of Fire (1979)
  - Live at the Rainbow 1977 (2008)
- With Gillan
  - Mr. Universe (1979)
  - Glory Road (1980)
  - Future Shock (1981)
  - Double Trouble (1981)
  - Magic (1982)
  - The Gillan Tapes Vol. 1 (1997)
  - The Gillan Tapes Vol. 2 (1999)
  - The Gillan Tapes Vol. 3 (2000)
  - Triple Trouble (2009) (Recorded live 1981/1982)
- As Mick Underwood
  - "Earthquake at the Savoy" / "Redwatch" (single) (1980)
- With Ian Gillan
  - What I Did on My Vacation (1986)
  - Cherkazoo and Other Stories (1992)
- With Quatermass II
  - Long Road (1997)
- With Raw Glory
  - City Life (2007)
