= Future Shock (Gillan album) =

Studio album by Gillan
- Released: 17 April 1981
- Recorded: January 1981
- Studio: Kingsway Recorders, London, UK
- Genre: Hard rock, heavy metal
- Length: 43:24
- Label: Virgin
- Producer: Gillan

Gillan chronology
Glory Road (1980)	Future Shock (1981)	Double Trouble (1981)

Singles from Glory Road
- 1. "New Orleans" Released: March 1981; 2. "No Laughing in Heaven" Released: 12 June 1981

Future Shock is the fourth studio album by the British hard rock band Gillan. Released by Virgin in 1981, it reached number 2 in the UK album chart; this would remain the band's highest placing.

The title is taken from Alvin Toffler's book Future Shock.

The original vinyl LP had a gatefold sleeve, with centre pages. Cover painting is by Alan Daniels for Young Artists.

== Reception ==
Professional ratings
Review scores
Source	Rating
AllMusic	4/5 stars
Collector's Guide to Heavy Metal	9/10

In 2005, Future Shock was ranked number 467 in the German Rock Hard magazine's book of The 500 Greatest Rock & Metal Albums of All Time.

== Track listing ==
Side one

1. "Future Shock" (Ian Gillan, John McCoy, Bernie Tormé) – 3:06
2. "Night Ride Out of Phoenix" (Gillan, Colin Towns) – 5:06
3. "(The Ballad Of) The Lucitania Express" (Gillan, McCoy, Tormé) – 3:10
4. "No Laughing in Heaven" (Gillan, McCoy, Tormé, Towns, Mick Underwood) – 4:58
5. "Sacre Bleu" (Gillan, McCoy, Tormé) – 3:03
6. "New Orleans" (Frank Guida, Joseph Royster) – 2:37 (Gary U.S. Bonds cover)

Side two

7. "Bite the Bullet" (Gillan, Towns) – 4:50
8. "If I Sing Softly" (Gillan, McCoy, Tormé) – 6:10
9. "Don't Want the Truth" (Gillan, McCoy, Tormé) – 5:40
10. "For Your Dreams" (Gillan, Towns) – 5:04

=== 1989 re-release bonus tracks ===
In 1989 the album was re-released in CD format on the Virgin label. The revised track listing featured several bonus tracks:

11. "One for the Road" (Gillan, Towns) – 3:03
12. "Bad News" (Gillan, McCoy, Tormé, Underwood) – 3:08
13. "Take a Hold of Yourself" (Gillan, McCoy, Towns, Underwood) – 4:42
14. "Mutually Assured Destruction (M.A.D.)" (Gillan, McCoy, Tormé, Towns, Underwood) – 3:13
15. "The Maelström (Longer Than the A Side)" (Gillan, McCoy, Tormé, Towns, Underwood) – 5:07
16. "Trouble" (Leiber, Stoller) – 2:39
17. "Your Sister's on My List" (Gillan, Towns) – 4:07
18. "Handles on Her Hips" (Gillan, McCoy, Tormé) – 2:10
19. "Higher and Higher" (Gillan, McCoy, Tormé) – 3:42
20. "I Might As Well Go Home (Mystic)" (Gillan, Towns) – 2:16

=== 2007 re-release bonus tracks ===
In 2007 the album was re-released in CD format again on the Edsel label. This has retrospective comments by Ian Gillan and the original artwork, plus pictures of various single picture sleeves. The revised track listing, similar to the 1989 release, had the following bonus tracks:

11. "Trouble" – 2:40
12. "Your Sister's on My List" – 4:07
13. "Mutually Assured Destruction" – 3:13
14. "The Maelström (Longer Than the A Side)" – 5:16
15. "Take a Hold of Yourself" – 4:42
16. "One for the Road" – 3:02
17. "Lucille" (Richard Wayne Penniman, Albert Collins) – 2:39
18. "Bad News" – 3:06

=== Other notable re-releases ===
In August 2012 a new collectors edition of the album was released on vinyl. The release was produced as a 12-inch hardback book, with all the lyrics, images, photos and art from the original. The records themselves are housed in black holders within the book, each in a special bag with sleeve notes detailing the story of the album. The discs were pressed at 45 rpm for clarity of sound. This edition was limited to just 1,000 copies.

== Personnel ==
Gillan

- Ian Gillan – vocals
- Bernie Tormé – guitar
- Colin Towns – keyboards
- John McCoy – bass
- Mick Underwood – drums

Production notes

- Recorded and mixed at Kingsway Recorders, London, January 1981
- Produced by K.R.
- Engineered by Paul Watkins
- Mixed by Paul Watkins, John McCoy with contributions from Colin Towns, Bernie Tormé and Mick Underwood

== Charts ==
=== Album ===
Chart (1981)	Peak position
Australian Albums (Kent Music Report)	64
Swedish Albums (Sverigetopplistan)	45
UK Albums (OCC)	2

Chart (2007)	Peak position
UK Independent Albums (OCC)	23
UK Rock & Metal Albums (OCC)	36

=== Singles ===
New Orleans

Chart (1981)	Peak position
UK Singles (OCC)	17

No Laughing in Heaven

Chart (1981)	Peak position
UK Singles (OCC)	31

== Certifications ==
Region	Certification	Certified units/sales
United Kingdom (BPI)	Silver	60,000^{^}
^{^} Shipments figures based on certification alone.
