= Edsel (disambiguation) =

The Edsel was an automobile manufactured by Ford Motor Company.

Edsel or Edsell may also refer to:

== People ==
- Edsel (given name), a list of people
- Edsel Dope (born 1974), stage name of singer and songwriter Brian Charles Ebejer
- Robert M. Edsel (born 1956), American writer and businessman
- Wilson C. Edsell (1814–1900), American politician, lawyer and banker

== Music ==
- The Edsels, an American doo-wop group of the late 1950s and early 1960s
- Edsel (band), an American indie rock/post-hardcore band
- Edsel Records, a London reissue label formed in 1979, now owned by Demon Music Group

== Places ==
- Edsel, Kentucky, an unincorporated community, US

== See also ==
- Edsall (disambiguation)
