= Gillan (band) =

English rock band fronted by Ian Gillan (1978–1982)

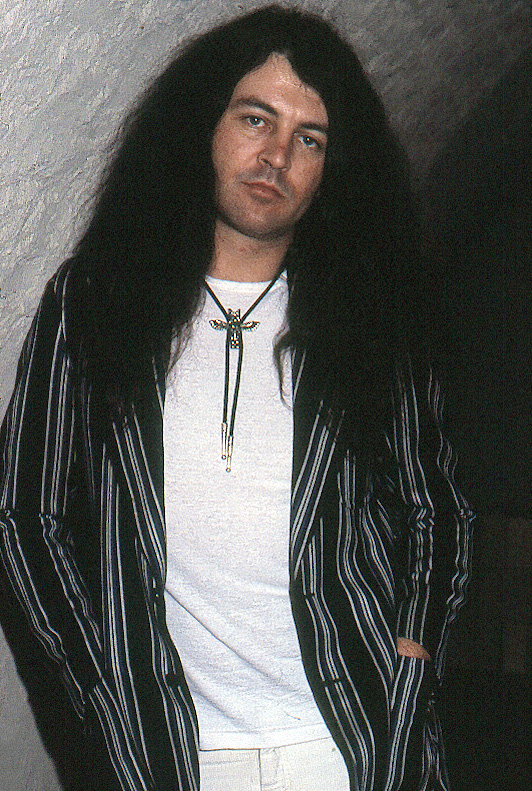
- Ian Gillan, frontman and leader of the band, in 1983

Background information
- Origin: London, England
- Genres: Hard rock; heavy metal
- Years active: 1978–1982
- Labels: Virgin, RSO, Acrobat, Edsel, Angel Air
- Past members: Ian Gillan; Colin Towns; Steve Byrd; Liam Genockey; John McCoy; Pete Barnacle; Bernie Tormé; Mick Underwood; Janick Gers

Gillan was an English rock band formed in 1978 by then-former Deep Purple vocalist Ian Gillan. Gillan was one of the hard rock bands to make a significant impact and achieve commercial success in the United Kingdom during the late 1970s and early 1980s, with five top 20 albums and six top 40 singles. The band split in late 1982 when Gillan joined Black Sabbath, before re-joining Deep Purple in 1984.

== History ==
=== 1978: Formation ===
In July 1978 Ian Gillan had become dissatisfied with the jazz fusion style of his band Ian Gillan Band and dissolved it, retaining only keyboard player Colin Towns, and formed this new band entitled Gillan. He added Steve Byrd on guitar, Liam Genockey on drums and John McCoy on bass, and initially pursued a progressive rock direction, releasing their eponymous debut in September 1978, although they could get a record deal only in Japan, Australia and New Zealand. This recording has subsequently become more widely available as The Japanese Album as a CD re-issue by RPM Records in 1994. However, the RPM CD issue replaces the original opening instrumental "Second Sight" with another instrumental, "Street Theatre". Genocky was unable to commit to the band beyond the recording of the album and the band's live debut at the Reading Festival in 1978. He was replaced for the subsequent tour by Pete Barnacle.

At Christmas 1978, Ian Gillan turned down an offer from Ritchie Blackmore to join Rainbow, but Blackmore did make a guest appearance for Gillan at their Christmas show. It was the first time Ian Gillan and Blackmore had performed together since 1973.

=== 1979–1981: The glory era ===
The album was sufficiently successful to attract more attention and in 1979 the band secured a European deal with Acrobat Records. Before a new album was recorded, Byrd was replaced by Bernie Tormé and Barnacle by drummer Mick Underwood, Ian Gillan's former colleague in Episode Six. Torme's "screaming guitar" sound fundamentally altered the dynamics and Gillan took a more heavy metal direction. This line-up's first album was released as Mr. Universe and contained many re-worked songs from The Japanese Album. The album went straight into the UK album charts but stalled as Acrobat Records went bankrupt. This led to a multi-album deal with Virgin Records.

Meanwhile, in Japan, Australia and New Zealand a version of Mr. Universe was released with a different track selection to avoid repeating the Gillan tracks used on the Mr. Universe album. Several of the alternative tracks are included on the Japanese Album release.

The band caught the rise of the NWOBHM at just the right time and the group gained popularity in Europe.

In 1980 Gillan reached the peak of their success, releasing the album Glory Road, with initial copies containing the free album For Gillan Fans Only. However, the band remained unknown in North America and were unable to raise any interest there despite a long and difficult 1980 US tour.

As with most of the post-Deep Purple bands, money remained very tight. By 1981 the band members were beginning to wonder why their European and Japanese success was not translating into increased financial rewards. Rumours also circulated that band funds were being diverted to pay for problems with Ian Gillan's failing hotel. Following the Future Shock album, whilst on tour in Germany, Torme left, just before the band were due to fly back to the UK to appear on Top of the Pops.

=== 1982: Struggles and final shows ===
Tormé was replaced by White Spirit guitarist Janick Gers (who would later join Iron Maiden) and this line-up released the live/studio double album Double Trouble at the end of 1981. In August 1982, the final album Magic followed. By this time, tension over money had reached fever pitch and Ian Gillan needed time to have surgery as a result of damage to his vocal cords. After the Magic tour, the band performed a final show at the Wembley Arena on 17 December, and then Ian Gillan dissolved the group while he underwent surgery. He then accepted an offer to front Black Sabbath to the incredulity of the Gillan band members, particularly McCoy, and the acrimony remains to the present day.

McCoy subsequently released compilations of studio out-takes to which he had the rights, known as The Gillan Tapes. Bernie Tormé and John McCoy collaborated on the GMT (Guy McCoy Tormé) band project, releasing two albums in 2006 and 2008. Tormé died in 2019, Underwood in 2024.

== Band members ==
- Ian Gillan – vocals (1978–1982)
- Colin Towns – keyboards (1978–1982)
- Steve Byrd – guitar (1978–1979; died 2016)
- Liam Genockey – drums (1978)
- John McCoy – bass (1978–1982)
- Pete Barnacle – drums (1978–1979)
- Bernie Tormé – guitar (1979–1981; died 2019)
- Mick Underwood – drums (1979–1982; died 2024)
- Janick Gers – guitar (1981–1982)

== Discography ==
=== Studio albums ===
Year	Title	Album details	Peak chart positions			Certifications (sales thresholds)
Year	Title	Album details	UK	AUS	SWE	Certifications (sales thresholds)
1978	Gillan (aka The Japanese Album)	Date: September 1978; Label: East World	—	—	—	
1979	Mr. Universe	Date: October 1979; Label: Acrobat	11	—	—	
1980	Glory Road	Date: August 1980; Label: Virgin	3	—	—	BPI: Silver
1981	Future Shock	Date: April 1981; Label: Virgin	2	64	45	BPI: Silver
1981	Double Trouble	Date: October 1981; Label: Virgin	12	—	—	
1982	Magic	Date: September 1982; Label: Virgin	17	—	—	
"—" denotes releases that did not chart.

- All Gillan albums recorded between 1979 and 1982 (excluding The Japanese Album) have been re-released as remastered editions with bonus tracks in 2007

=== Live albums ===
- Live at Reading '80 (1990), Raw Fruit
- The BBC Tapes Vol 1: Dead of Night 1979 (1998), RPM
- The BBC Tapes Vol 2: Unchain Your Brain 1980 (1998), RPM
- Live at the BBC - 79/80 (1999), Angel Air
- Live Tokyo Shinjuku Koseinenkin Hall (2001), Angel Air
- On The Rocks - Live in Germany, June 1981 (2002), Angel Air
- Live Wembley 17 December 1982 (2002), Angel Air
- Mutually Assured Destruction Glasgow 1982 (2006), Angel Air
- Live at the Marquee 1978 (2008), Angel Air
- No Easy Way - Live Hammersmith 1980 (CD), Live Edinburgh 1980 (DVD, 2008), Angel Air
- Triple Trouble (2009) (recorded live 1981/1982), Edsel

=== Compilation albums ===
- Trouble - The Best of Gillan (1991), Virgin
- The Gillan Tapes Vol. 1 (1997), Angel Air
- The Gillan Tapes Vol. 2 (1999), Angel Air
- The Gillan Tapes Vol. 3 (2000), Angel Air
- Unchain Your Brain: The Best Of Gillan (2007), Music Club
- The Gillan Singles Box Set (2007), Edsel
- The Vinyl Collection 1979-1982 (2016)

=== DVDs ===
- Live Edinburgh 1980 (2006), Angel Air
- The Glory Years (2008) (Recorded live 1981), Eagle Rock

=== Singles ===
Year	Title	Peak chart positions	Album
Year	Title	UK	Album
1979	"Vengeance"	—	Mr. Universe
1980	"Sleeping on the Job"	55	Glory Road
1980	"No Easy Way"	—	Glory Road
1980	"Trouble"	14	Non-album single
1981	"Mutually Assured Destruction"	32	Non-album single
1981	"New Orleans"	17	Future Shock
1981	"No Laughing in Heaven"	31	Future Shock
1981	"Nightmare"	36	Double Trouble
1982	"Restless"	25	Double Trouble
1982	"Living for the City"	50	Magic
1982	"Long Gone"	—	Magic
"—" denotes releases that did not chart.
