= Trouble (Elvis Presley song) =

Song by Elvis Presley

from the album King Creole
- Released: July 29, 1958
- Recorded: January 15, 1958
- Genre: Rock and roll, blues, proto-punk
- Length: 2:16
- Label: RCA Victor
- Songwriter: Jerry Leiber and Mike Stoller

"Trouble" is a blues song written by Jerry Leiber and Mike Stoller, originally performed by Elvis Presley in 1958 and covered by a number of artists in later years.

== Background ==
Elvis Presley performed the song in the 1958 motion picture King Creole, and his recording was included on the soundtrack of the same name. "Trouble", featuring Scotty Moore on guitar, was one of only three songs written by Leiber and Stoller for the feature. Presley's performance in the film alludes to Muddy Waters and Bo Diddley. "If you're looking for trouble," he intones, "then look right in my face. Because I'm evil. My middle name is Misery." Music critic Maury Dean suggests that "Trouble", with Presley's "growling snarl", is one of the earliest proto-punk rock songs.

Ten years later, Presley opened his 1968 comeback special with this number. With dark, moody lighting highlighting his sneer, the sequence alluded to Presley's checkered past and "dangerous" image and served to prove that the singer was still "sexy, surly and downright provocative". The piece then segued into "Guitar Man" against a "Jailhouse Rock" backdrop featuring male dancers in cells.

In the 2022 film Elvis, Presley is portrayed as performing “Trouble” at Russwood Park in Memphis, Tennessee on July 4, 1956, but the truth is that he did not sing the song at that concert because it hadn't been written yet. They used it in the movie because the lyrics fit the scene depicted. As we know, “Trouble” was not played by Elvis before he recorded it in 1958 for his film, King Creole.

Presley performed the song several times on tour in the early 1970s and unofficial recordings of these performances have circulated. In 1975, Presley recorded "T-R-O-U-B-L-E" for a single, but this is a completely different song.

The song was included in the musical revue Smokey Joe's Cafe.

== Composition ==
The song uses the same "stop-time" riff as Muddy Waters' 1954 song "Hoochie Coochie Man" written by Willie Dixon. This particular riff is one of the most recognizable lick in blues, and is also heard in Bo Diddley's "I'm A Man" (1955) and Muddy Waters' "Mannish Boy" (1955).

Indeed, the key feature of the song is the use of stop time, or pauses in the music, during the first half of the progression. This musical device is commonly heard in New Orleans jazz, when the instrumentation briefly stops, allowing for a short instrumental solo before resuming.

== Notable cover versions ==
- Jackie DeShannon released the earliest cover version of this song as "Jackie Shannon" on PJ 101 and Dot 15980 in 1959.
- Suzi Quatro covers it on her second album, Quatro, released in October 1974.
- A cover version by Gillan peaked at No. 14 in the UK Singles chart in October 1980.
- A cover version by Danzig was released on their EP Thrall-Demonsweatlive in 1993.
- Broadway actress/singer Brenda Braxton performed the song in the Broadway musical revue Smokey Joe's Cafe from 1995 to 2000.
- A cover version by the jam band Goose from their live show on 11/19/21 at the Belly up in Aspen Colorado
- Actor Austin Butler performed the song in the 2022 film, Elvis.

== Usage ==
Figure skating world champion Javier Fernández performed part of his Elvis Presley free program to "Trouble" during the 2016–17 season, when he won his fifth consecutive European Championships gold medal. The program also included sections of "Fever" and "Jailhouse Rock".

American pop singer Britney Spears performed part of the first verse during her infamous comeback performance at the 2007 MTV Video Music Awards before segueing into "Gimme More".
