= Bernie Tormé =

Irish musician (1952–2019)

- Born: Bernard Joseph Tormey; 18 March 1952; Ranelagh, Dublin, Ireland
- Died: 17 March 2019 (aged 66) London, England
- Genres: Hard rock, heavy metal, punk rock, blues rock
- Occupations: Musician, songwriter
- Instrument: Guitar
- Years active: 1970–2019
- Website: http://www.bernietormeofficial.com

Bernie Tormé (born Bernard Joseph Tormey; 18 March 1952 – 17 March 2019) was an Irish rock guitarist, songwriter, record label and recording studio owner. Tormé is best known for his work with Gillan, as well as his brief stint with Ozzy Osbourne replacing Randy Rhoads. After two solo albums, he formed the band Tormé. He also became the lead guitarist of the band Desperado with Twisted Sister singer Dee Snider. From 2014 to 2018, Tormé released four solo albums.

== Early career ==
The Ranelagh-born Tormé was inspired by the likes of Jimi Hendrix, Jeff Beck, Rory Gallagher, and Gary Moore. He formed his first band at a young age. His first paid performance came when Don Harris, a 14-year-old drummer he played alongside when he was 17, secured a gig at the local Girl Guides' dance in Kilmainham in Dublin. Tormé then played in Dublin band The Urge in the early 1970s, before relocating to London in 1974, where he initially played with heavy rockers Scrapyard, whose bass player, John McCoy would later be re-united with Tormé in Gillan. Inspired by England's burgeoning mid-1970s punk rock scene, Tormé formed the Bernie Tormé Band in 1976. With this group, Tormé toured with successful groups of that period such as The Boomtown Rats and Billy Idol's Generation X, among many others. Tormé later revealed that his band secured the supporting slot with the Boomtown Rats by agreeing to go around London putting up posters advertising the tour.

In 1977 the band were asked to contribute two tracks to the Live at the Vortex album, "Streetfighter" and "Living for Kicks". This led to them being signed to the Jet Records label, who "...paid us forty quid a week each for the next 18 months... Apart from that they just sat on us pretty much, they were more into ELO."

== Gillan and Ozzy Osbourne ==
Tormé accepted the invitation of former Deep Purple vocalist Ian Gillan in 1979 to join his band Gillan. Over the next two years, Gillan enjoyed three Top Ten UK albums (Mr. Universe, Glory Road, and Future Shock), in addition to extensive worldwide tours of Europe, Japan, and the United States.

In 1981 Tormé left Gillan, citing frustration over a lack of money despite the success the band was seeing. He was replaced by guitarist Janick Gers. He played as a live session man for Atomic Rooster and was hired in March 1982 by Jet Records, to replace the recently deceased Randy Rhoads in Ozzy Osbourne's band.

== Solo career ==
Immediately prior to joing Ozzy, Tormé formed the band Electric Gypsies with guitarist Derwood Andrews and drummer Mark Laff (both formerly of Generation X and Empire) and ex-Bethnal bassist Everton Williams. The band rehearsed for a tour, before Tormé got the call to join Ozzy. On his return, Andrews and Laff had moved on, so he and Williams recruited ex-Def Leppard drummer Frank Noon to tour Tormé's solo album Turn Out The Lights, which reached no.50 in the UK album chart. The second album, Electric Gypsies (1983), was critically acclaimed. He also formed a band called Tormé, with singer Phil Lewis, formerly of Girl and later with L.A. Guns.

Tormé spent the last few years of the decade writing and recording with his new band Desperado, co-founded with former Twisted Sister singer Dee Snider. Their debut album was released in 1996. Snider later re-used a number of the songs for a subsequent project, Widowmaker (not to be confused with the 1970s English band of the same name).

Tormé played guitar on René Berg's solo album, The Leather, The Loneliness... And Your Dark Eyes, released in 1992.

In addition to the continued re-issuance of his back catalogue titles, Tormé recorded three new albums: Demolition Ball (with a revamped lineup of the band Tormé), Wild Irish (1997) and White Trash Guitar (1999). Tormé also became involved with the project called 'Silver', which also included former Michael Schenker Group vocalist Gary Barden. They recorded three albums, released in 2001-2003.

In 2006, Tormé announced the formation of Guy McCoy Tormé (aka "GMT"), with former Gillan bassist John McCoy and drummer Robin Guy. In 2007, Tormé contributed lead guitar and sitar parts to "Smile in Denial", track No. 4 of Yoni, a solo album from Wildhearts frontman Ginger.

Bernie successfully released 4 albums via the Pledgemusic platform between 2014 and 2018, and his last album Shadowland, featuring drummer Mik Gaffney (The Last Resort) and Sy Morton on bass, was released in November 2018, followed by the 'Final Fling' UK tour starting on 22 November. Unfortunately Pledgemusic did not honour their outstanding payments to Bernie Tormé on his last release.

Tormé also ran his own record label, Retrowrek Records, and recording studios, Barnroom Studios in Kent.

== Death ==
In February 2019, it was reported that Tormé was "extremely ill with virulent double pneumonia". He died on 17 March 2019, a day before he would have turned 67. He is survived by his wife Lisa Valder and their three children, Jimi, Eric and Tallulah, and his sister Cliodna Murphy.

== Discography ==
=== Studio Albums ===
Bernie Tormé Band

- Live at the Vortex Vol. 1 (2 tracks contributed to compilation) (1977)
- I'm Not Ready (7") (1978)
- Bernie Tormé Band (EP, with Phil Spalding and Mark Harrison) (1979)

Bernie Tormé

- Turn Out The Lights (1982) – UK No. 50
- Electric Gypsies (1983)
- Wild Irish (1997, a project with Anti-Nowhere League members Chris Jones and John Pearce)
- Punk Or What (recordings from 1977 to 1979, released in 1998)
- Flowers & Dirt (2014, double album)
- Blackheart (2015)
- Dublin Cowboy (2017, triple album)
- Shadowland (2018)

Tormé

- Back To Babylon (1985)
- Die Pretty, Die Young (1987)
- Demolition Ball (1993)

Bernie Tormé & the Electric Gypsies

- White Trash Guitar (1999)

Gillan

- Mr. Universe (1979)
- Glory Road (1980)
- Future Shock (1981)

Desperado

- Bloodied, But Unbowed (1996, rereleased in 2006)

René Berg

- The Leather, The Loneliness... And Your Dark Eyes (1992)

Silver (band fronted by Gary Barden)

- Silver (2001)
- Dream Machines (2002)
- Intruder (2003)

Guy McCoy Tormé (GMT)

- Cannonball (2006, EP)
- Bitter & Twisted (2006)
- Evil Twin (2008)

=== Live albums ===
- Bernie Tormé - Live (1984)
- Tormé - Official Bootleg (1987)
- Bernie Tormé/Electric Gypsies - Scorched Earth - Live 1999-2001 (2001)
- Bernie Tormé - Live Sheffield 1983 (2002)
- GMT - Raw - Live (2011)
- Bernie Tormé - Final Fling (2022)

=== Box Sets ===
- Lightning Strikes: 1982-1983 (2023)
- Tormé: The Bernie Tormé Archives Vol 2 - 1985-1993 (2024)
