= John McCoy (musician) =

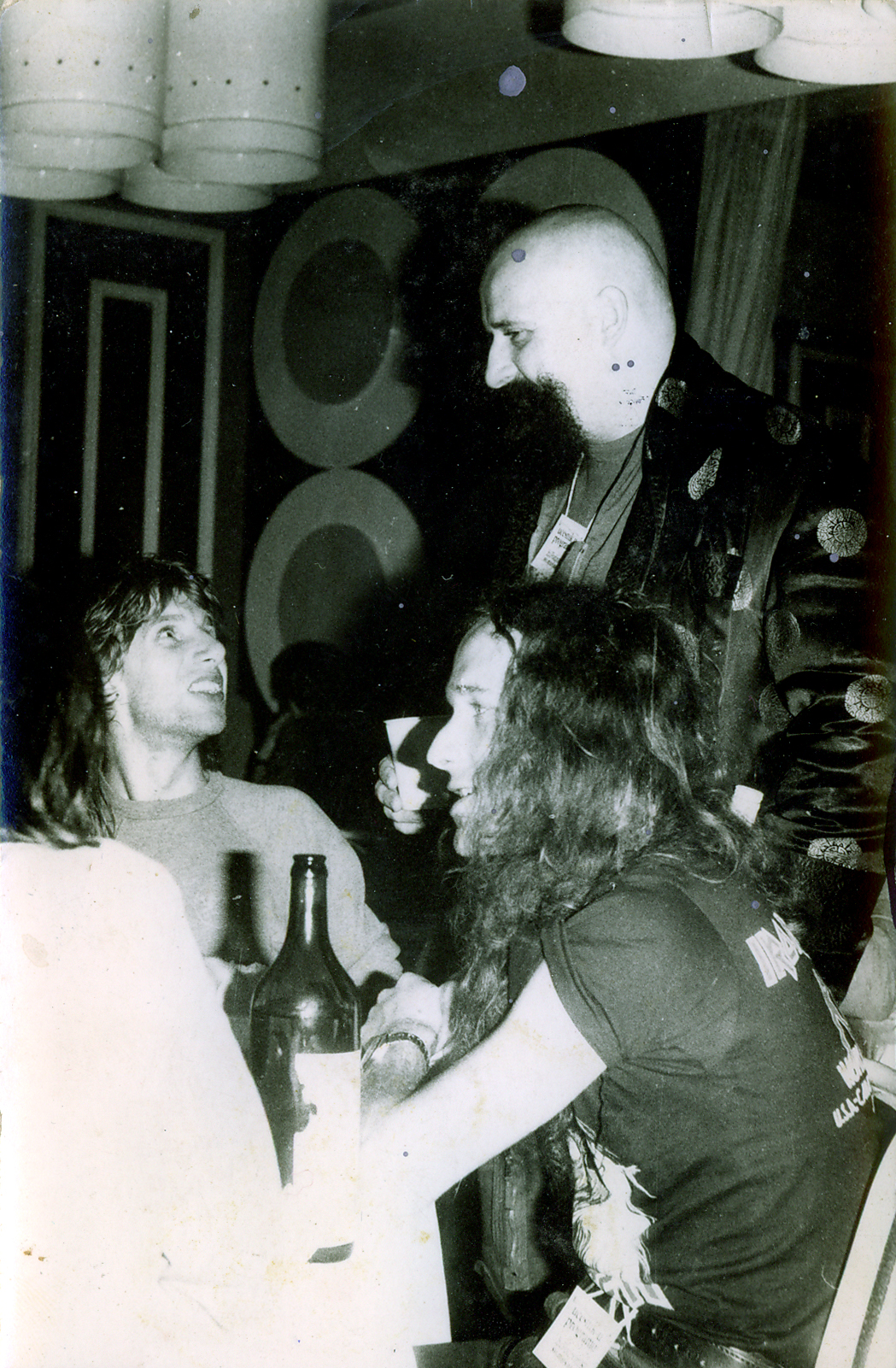
- McCoy (standing) backstage with Iron Maiden in 1981

Background information
- Born: John Matthew McCoy; 9 March 1950 (age 76); Huddersfield, Yorkshire, England
- Genres: Rock; hard rock; heavy metal; blues rock; punk rock
- Occupations: Musician; songwriter; record producer
- Instruments: Bass; guitar; drums; percussion; vocals
- Years active: 1960s–present
- Labels: Angel Air; Fantasy Island; Edel; Virgin; Metal Blade

John Matthew McCoy (born 9 March 1950) is an English bass guitarist, who is best known for his work with Ian Gillan and Mammoth as well as numerous other bands and sessions since the late 1960s. He also played in British rock trio Guy McCoy Tormé with former Gillan/Ozzy guitarist Bernie Tormé and Bruce Dickinson/Sack Trick drummer Robin Guy. He is also an accomplished guitar, drum, trumpet, cello, and double bass player. Nearly as well known as his music is his appearance: he is always pictured wearing sunglasses, with the striking contrast of bald head and robust chin beard. Along with guitarist Vic Elmes and ZZebra colleague Liam Genockey on drums, McCoy can also be heard playing in the intro and end titles theme of the 1970s cult TV series Space: 1999.

== Early career ==
In the 1960s, when he was 13, whilst still at school, McCoy began playing as lead guitarist with a working beat group, The Drovers. In 1966 he responded to an advertisement in the Yorkshire Post newspaper for a guitarist to join a band called Mamas Little Children who were about to begin touring Germany. McCoy went to audition only to find they had just given someone else the position, but still needed a bass player. He auditioned on a spare bass that was there and was given the job. In 1968 he was forced to resign from the band because he was working illegally underage. On his return to Britain, he went to London where he found work as a session musician with former Drifters member Clyde McPhatter touring the UK.

In 1974, McCoy was playing with London-based band Scrapyard when they recruited Irish-born lead guitarist Bernie Tormé. Although Tormé eventually left to form his own punk rock band, the two were later reunited in former Deep Purple singer Ian Gillan's band.

On 18 July 2009, John McCoy performed at the Furnace in Swindon Wiltshire, England Performing in a group G.M.T with Bernie Tormé, Robin Guy (former drummer with Iron Maiden's Bruce Dickinson and Faith No More). More recently John has played with Tyla Gang, appearing on a live album recorded in Sweden.

== Career with Gillan ==
In July 1978, the jazz-rock fusion Ian Gillan Band were altering direction, under the influence of keyboards player Colin Towns in a return to Ian Gillan's hard rock roots. Towns had begun writing new material, and Gillan gave him the task of recruiting the new line-up. Towns recruited session drummer Liam Genockey, McCoy and guitarist Richard Brampton, who was replaced by Steve Byrd - a former colleague of McCoy's from ZZebra - almost immediately. Within a month of their formation the band had recorded their first album, Gillan, and they made their live debut at the Reading Festival on 16 August 1978. They were originally listed there as the Ian Gillan Band but, in a move away from the jazz-rock connotations, they renamed the band, Gillan.

Gillan underwent a further three line-up changes, but McCoy remained as bass player until the band eventually split acrimoniously in 1982. John released a mini album in 1983 with T Bone Rees on vocals, Steve Linton guitar, Liam Genockey on Drums and Colin Towns on Keyboards. The single ‘Oh Well’ was taken from the album with the b side ‘Because You Lied’ in reference to the acrimonious split. Steve Linton plays guitar on both tracks.

== Mammoth ==
In late 1986, McCoy recruited session drummer Vinnie "Tubby" Reed, guitarist "Big" Mac Baker and vocalist Nicky Moore to form a band initially called Dinosaur. The name was already in use by a Californian band, so McCoy renamed his new band Mammoth. The name was also a tongue-in-cheek reference to the large size of the band members: McCoy weighed 120 kg (19 st) or 265 pounds, Reed 140 kg (22 st) or 309 pounds, Baker 152 kg (23.9 st) or 355 pounds, and Moore 127 kg (20.0 st) or 280 pounds.

The band toured with Whitesnake and Marillion and were well received by fans. They released three singles, "Fatman", "All The Days" and 'Can't Take The Hurt"; and two albums, Mammoth (1988) and Larger And Live (previously known as XXXL, 1997). In 1988, the entire band appeared in the film Just Ask For Diamond, playing the henchmen. Musically, commercial success eluded them however and the band eventually split in 1989, with McCoy becoming an independent producer.

== Equipment ==
McCoy usually uses a traditional four string fretted Fender Precision bass and predominantly Marshall amplification in various configurations. Although he has used Trace Elliot, he has described it as "...a bit clean for my personal taste..." Currently he uses a Marshall 200w integrated amp driving a 2x15 cab and a Marshall 100w lead amp driving 4x12 cabs.

His playing style utilises both pick and fingers, although he plays mostly with picks, preferring Fender extra heavy large triangles "...for greater precision and attack."

== List of bands and artists worked with ==
- The Drovers
- Mamas Little Children
- Clyde McPhatter
- Welcome
- Curtiss Maldoon
- Julie Felix
- V.H.F.
- Scrapyard
- Samson
- John Du Cann
- Riblja Čorba
- Francis Rossi
- Andy Bown
- Pete Kircher
- Neo
- Mike Hugg
- ZZebra
- McCoy
- Quadrant
- The Coolies
- Curved Air
- Atomic Rooster
- Bernie Tormé
- Gillan
- Colin Towns
- Sledgehammer
- U.K. Subs
- Mammoth
- Sun Red Sun
- Joey Belladonna
- Rafi Weinstock
- The Split Knee Loons
- Skintight Jaguars
- G.M.T.
- Twin Dragons
- Tyla Gang
- Steve Linton
- Riblja Čorba
