= Colin Towns =

- Born: Colin William Towns; 13 May 1948 (age 78); West Ham, London, England
- Genres: Classical; jazz; progressive rock; heavy metal; hard rock; ambient
- Occupations: Musician; composer; producer; arranger
- Instruments: Keyboards; piano; guitar; bass; vocals; string arrangements
- Years active: 1976–present
- Website: colintowns.com

Colin William Towns (born 13 May 1948) is an English composer and keyboardist. He was noted for playing in bands formed by ex-Deep Purple singer Ian Gillan, and later worked extensively in composing soundtracks for film, television and commercials. Learning piano as a child, by the age of 13 he was earning money playing at weddings and birthdays in his neighbourhood of the East End of London. He went on to play in numerous dance bands, jazz ensembles and also became a session musician. His main musical passion is jazz and he has made several well-received albums together with his big band, the Mask Orchestra. He has also founded an independent record label, Provocateur.

== Career ==
In 1976 he was recruited as keyboardist to replace Mickey Lee Soule in the Ian Gillan Band. Over the time he developed an increasing interest in composing, and Gillan credits the Towns-penned 'Fighting Man' as pointing the direction in which Gillan should go. Gillan dissolved the band, with its jazz-rock leanings, and retained only Towns, putting together the rockier Gillan. Encouraged by Gillan, Towns co-wrote many of the songs for the new band. Whilst with the band he used his free time to seek opportunities to compose music beyond the heavy metal direction of Gillan. His 1980 solo album remains unreleased, although one track was reworked for the 'For Gillan Fans Only' LP, and Making Faces was released in 1982. He composed the soundtrack for the 1977 Mia Farrow-starring film Full Circle, which received reviews praising the music. With bassist John McCoy, Towns guested on Samson's 1979 album Survivors.

In 1982, Towns played with the Spanish rock band Barón Rojo, when they recorded Volumen Brutal.

In 1982, Ian Gillan dissolved the band, and Towns decided to pursue soundtrack composing full-time. In that year he won the commission to write the score for the film Slayground. From then on he was in constant demand, particularly in British television, where his body of work is extensive, and includes Chiller, An Unsuitable Job for a Woman, The Buccaneers, The Crow Road, Dalziel and Pascoe, Ghostboat, Rockface, Into the Blue, The Blackheath Poisonings, Bodyguards, Cadfael, Clarissa, Capital City, Noah's Ark, Pie in the Sky, The Beggar Bride, Our Friends in the North, Between the Lines, Mobile, Cold Blood, Anglo-Saxon Attitudes, Doc Martin, Half Broken Things, Foyle's War, Ivanhoe, Hot Money, Deceit and Imogen's Face.

In 1993, he composed the music for the idents and bumpers of the TSI's masked troubadour.

He also composed the music for the popular children's animation series Angelina Ballerina as well as several other animation series and films for children including The World of Peter Rabbit and Friends, The Story Store, Truckers, The Wind in the Willows, The Willows in Winter, The Tale of Jack Frost, Oi! Get Off our Train, Toot and Puddle, Fungus the Bogeyman, The Sandman and Faeries.

His other film credits include Rawhead Rex (1986), Bellman and True (1987), Vampire's Kiss (1988, starring Nicolas Cage), Getting It Right (1989), The Wolves of Willoughby Chase (1989), Hands of a Murderer (1990, starring Edward Woodward), The Puppet Masters (1994, featuring Donald Sutherland), Captives (1994, featuring Tim Roth), Space Truckers (1996, featuring Dennis Hopper), Guest House Paradiso (1999), Essex Boys (2000), Man Dancin' (2003), Crimson Rivers II: Angels of the Apocalypse (2004), and Red Mercury (2005). Several times he has worked for the German director Claudia Garde for the TV series Tatort.

His work for television is extensive and includes the score for the highly successful UK series Doc Martin, starring Martin Clunes as the grumpy doctor of the fictional Cornish town Port Wen.

Towns' principal musical passion is jazz and has released several albums with the big band he founded, the Mask Orchestra. A long-term collaboration with the Italian-born jazz singer Maria Pia De Vito began in 1996.

In 2010 Towns formed Blue Touch Paper with German and UK musicians. Alongside Towns were Mark Lockheart (Polar Bear, Loose Tubes), Chris Montague (Troyka, Kit Downes), Benny Greb (Stoppok, Ron Spielman), Stephan Maass (Randy Brecker, Kruder & Dorfmeister), and Edward Maclean (Peter Fox, Nils Wülker). Blue Touch Paper released their debut album 'Stand Well Back' in May 2011. Their second album 'Drawing Breath' was released in October 2013.
