= List of Atomic Rooster members =

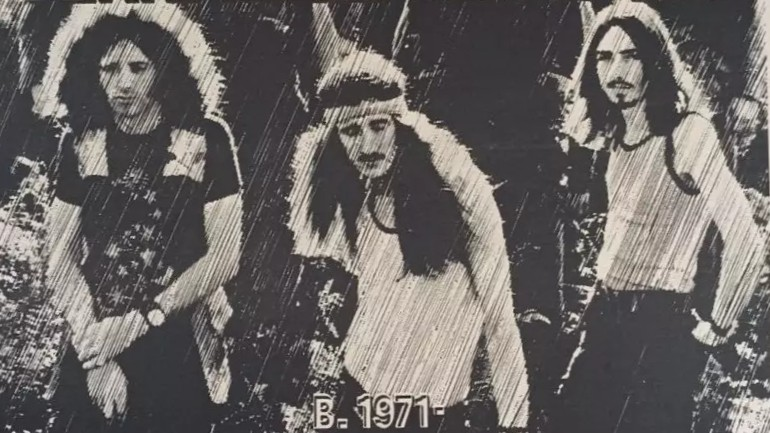
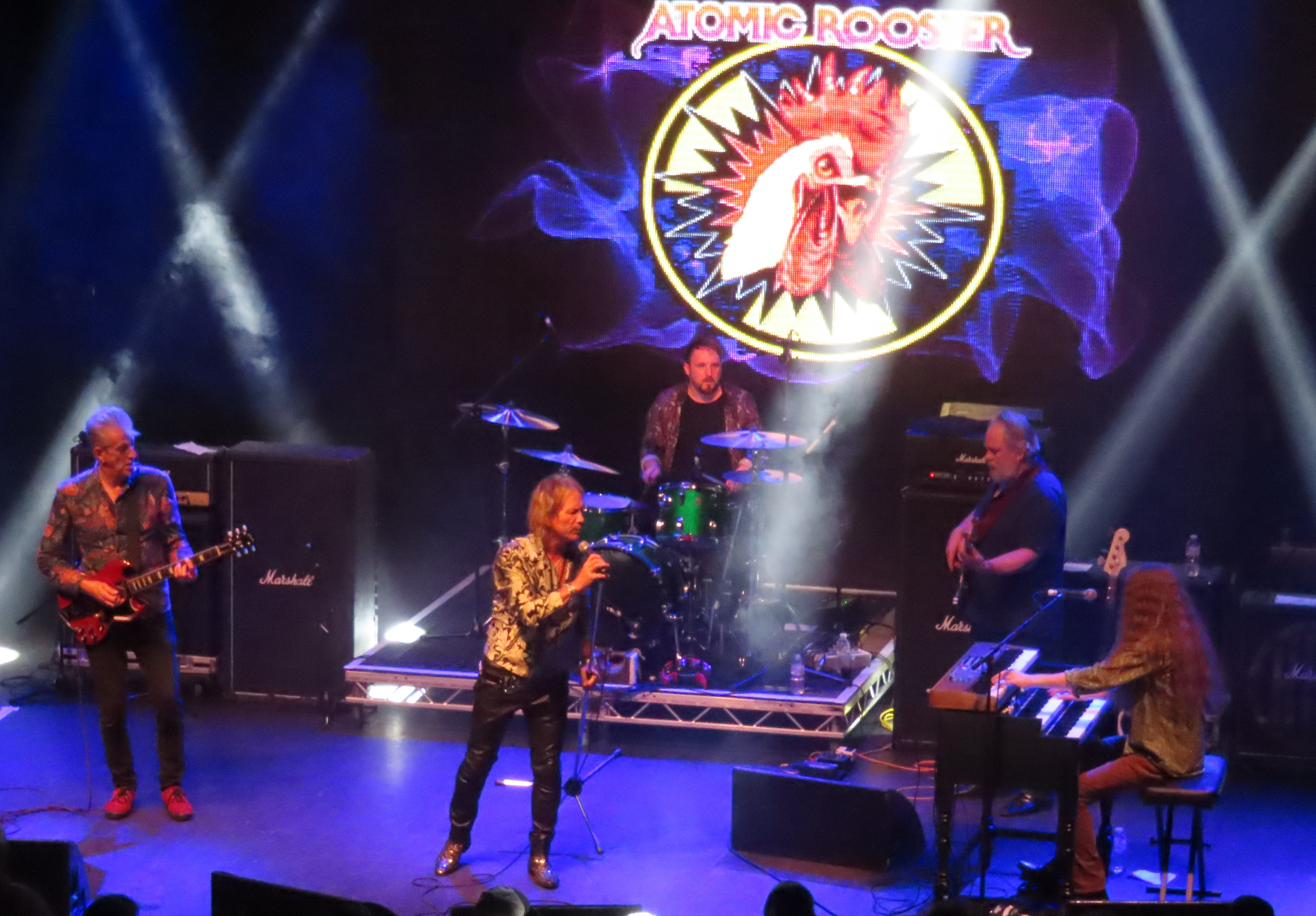
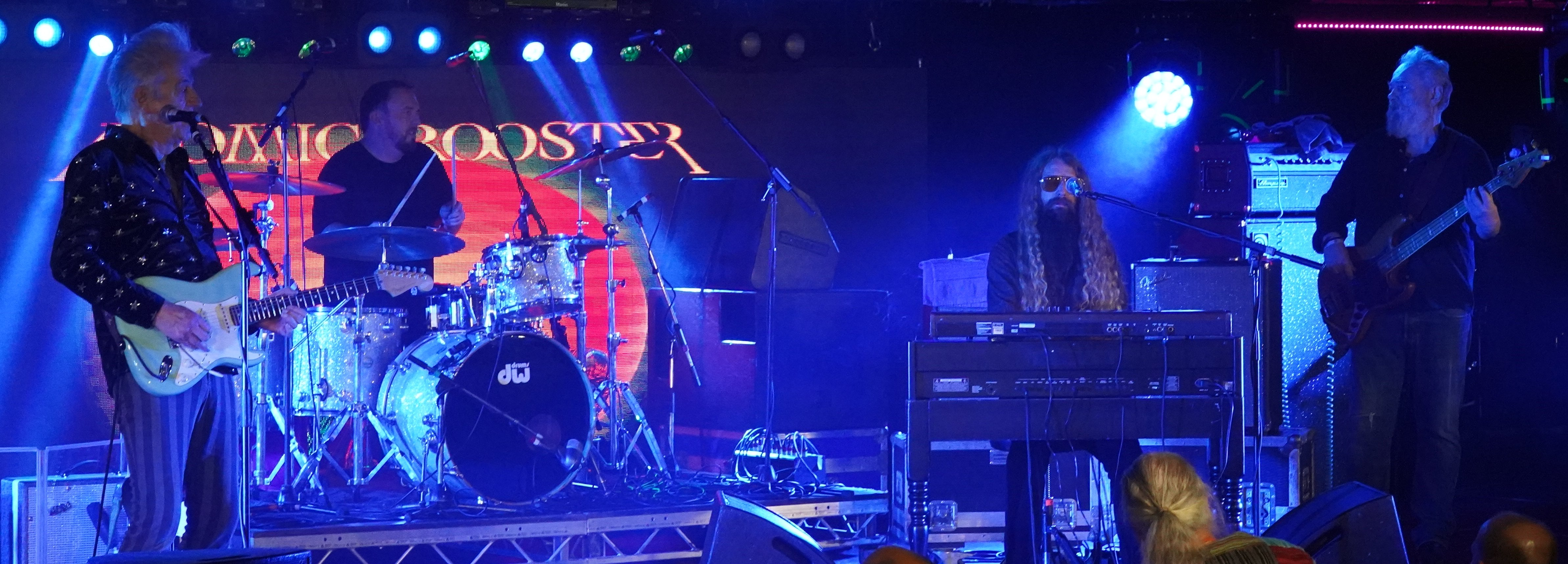
Atomic Rooster in 1971, 2021 and 2025

Atomic Rooster are an English progressive rock band from London. Formed in 1969, the group originally included former Crazy World of Arthur Brown keyboardist Vincent Crane and drummer Carl Palmer, in addition to bassist, flautist and vocalist Nick Graham. Shortly after the release of the band's debut album Atomic Roooster, guitarist John Du Cann joined the group and took over on lead vocals, as Graham departed. Palmer left later in the year to form Emerson, Lake & Palmer, with Ric Parnell temporarily taking his place. Paul Hammond later joined in time for the recording of Death Walks Behind You. During the recording of 1971's In Hearing of Atomic Rooster, Pete French was brought in as the band's new lead vocalist. Du Cann was subsequently fired by Crane, with Hammond choosing to leave alongside him.

Du Cann and Hammond were replaced by Steve Bolton and Parnell, respectively. Chris Farlowe took over from French in early 1972, first contributing to the album Made in England. Bolton had left the group by the end of the year, with John Goodsall (under the name Johnny Mandala) taking his place for the 1973 release Nice 'n' Greasy. By early 1974, everyone but Crane had left Atomic Rooster; the keyboardist continued to tour under the name "Vincent Crane's Atomic Rooster", adding former Sam Apple Pie members Sam "Tomcat" Sampson (vocals), Andy Johnson, Denny "Pancho" Barnes (both guitars), Bob "Dog" Rennie (bass) and Lee Baxter Hayes (drums) before disbanding the group in early 1975. Following the band's breakup, Crane worked on music for plays and radio dramas, as well as collaborating with former bandmate Arthur Brown.

In mid-1980, Crane reformed Atomic Rooster with former guitarist and vocalist Du Cann. Preston Heyman performed drums on the band's self-titled comeback album. Former Cream drummer Ginger Baker joined for a brief period in September, but had left within a month to join Hawkwind. Paul Hammond had returned to the band by the end of the year, marking a reunion of the Death Walks Behind You lineup. Du Cann left in 1982, with guitars on the band's seventh album Headline News performed by new member Bernie Tormé and Pink Floyd's David Gilmour. After a few months of touring, with more lineup changes, Atomic Rooster disbanded again in late 1983. Crane committed suicide in 1989, while Hammond died of an accidental drug overdose in 1992, and Du Cann died after a heart attack in 2011.

Over 30 years after the band's breakup, Atomic Rooster reformed in 2016 with the blessing of Crane's widow Jean, with former members Pete French and Steve Bolton joined by bassist Shug Millidge, keyboardist Christian Madden and drummer Bo Walsh. Madden was replaced by Adrian Gautrey in 2017, after the former joined Liam Gallagher's touring band. In late 2023, French departed the group and Gautrey took over lead vocals.

== Members ==
=== Current ===
Image	Name	Years active	Instruments	Release contributions
	Steve "Boltz" Bolton	1971–1972; 2016–present	guitar; vocals (2016–present)	Made in England (1972); BBC Radio 1 Live in Concert (1992); Devil's Answer (1998); Circle the Sun (2025)
	Shug Millidge	2016–present	bass guitar	Circle the Sun (2025)
	Adrian Gautrey	2017–present	keyboards; vocals	Circle the Sun (2025)
	Paul Everett	2020–present	drums	Circle the Sun (2025)

=== Former ===
Image	Name	Years active	Instruments	Release contributions
	Vincent Crane	1969–1975; 1980–1983 (died 1989)	keyboards; piano; synthesizer; vocals; keybass (1970–1974, 1980–1982, 1983)	all Atomic Rooster releases to date
	Carl Palmer	1969–1970	drums; percussion	Atomic Roooster (1970); Devil's Answer (1998); Live and Raw 70/71 (2000)
	Nick Graham	1969–1970	bass guitar; vocals; flute; guitar (studio)	Atomic Roooster (1970)
	John Du Cann	1970–1971; 1980–1982 (died 2011)	guitar; vocals; bass guitar	Atomic Roooster (1970) – overdubs on reissue; Death Walks Behind You (1970); In Hearing of Atomic Rooster (1971); Atomic Rooster (1980); Devil's Answer (1998); Live and Raw 70/71 (2000); Live at the Marquee 1980 (2002)
	Ric Parnell	1970; 1971–1974 (died 2022)	drums; percussion	Made in England (1972); Nice 'n' Greasy (1973); BBC Radio 1 Live in Concert (1992); Devil's Answer (1998)
	Paul Hammond	1970–1971; 1980–1983 (died 1992)	drums; percussion	Death Walks Behind You (1970); In Hearing of Atomic Rooster (1971); Headline News (1983); Live and Raw 70/71 (2000); Live in Germany 1983 (2000); Live at the Marquee 1980 (2002)
	Pete French	1971; 2016–2023	vocals	In Hearing of Atomic Rooster (1971)
	Chris Farlowe	1972–1974	vocals	Made in England (1972); Nice 'n' Greasy (1973); BBC Radio 1 Live in Concert (1992); Devil's Answer (1998)
	John Goodsall (as Johnny Mandala)	1972–1974 (died 2021)	guitar	Nice 'n' Greasy (1973)
	Sam "Tomcat" Sampson	1974–1975	vocals	none
	Andy "Snakehip" Johnson	1974–1975 (died 2010)	guitar	none
	Denny "Pancho" Barnes	1974–1975	guitar	none
	Bob "Dog" Rennie	1974–1975	bass guitar	none
	Lee Baxter Hayes	1974–1975	drums	none
	Preston Heyman	1980	drums	Atomic Rooster (1980)
	Ginger Baker	1980 (died 2019)	drums	none
	Mick Hawksworth	1982	bass guitar	none
	John McCoy	1982–1983	bass guitar	none
	Bernie Tormé	1983 (died 2019)	guitar	Headline News (1983); Live in Germany 1983 (2000)
	John Mizarolli	1983	guitar	Headline News (1983)
	Christian Madden	2016–2017	keyboards	none
	Bo Walsh	2016–2020	drums	none

== Line-ups ==
Period	Members	Releases
1969–1970	Vincent Crane – keyboards, backing vocals; Nick Graham – bass, flute, vocals, guitar; Carl Palmer – drums, percussion	Atomic Roooster (1970)
1970	Vincent Crane – keyboards, backing vocals, keybass; Carl Palmer – drums, percussion; John Du Cann – guitar, vocals	Devil's Answer (1998); Live and Raw 70/71 (2000)
1970	Vincent Crane – keyboards, backing vocals, keybass; John Du Cann – guitar, vocals; Ric Parnell – drums, percussion	
1970–1971	Vincent Crane – keyboards, backing vocals, keybass; John Du Cann – guitar, vocals; Paul Hammond – drums, percussion	Death Walks Behind You (1970); Live and Raw 70/71 (2000); Devil's Answer (1998)
1971	Vincent Crane – keyboards, backing vocals, keybass; John Du Cann – guitar, backing vocals; Paul Hammond – drums, percussion; Pete French – vocals	In Hearing of Atomic Rooster (1971)
1971 (briefly)	Vincent Crane – keyboards, backing vocals, keybass; Pete French – vocals; Steve Bolton – guitar; Ric Parnell – drums, percussion	none
1971–1972	Vincent Crane – keyboards, vocals, keybass; Steve Bolton – guitar; Ric Parnell – drums, percussion	none
1972	Vincent Crane – keyboards, backing vocals, keybass; Steve Bolton – guitar; Ric Parnell – drums, percussion; Chris Farlowe – vocals	Made in England (1972); BBC Radio 1 Live in Concert (1993); Devil's Answer (1998)
1972–1974	Vincent Crane – keyboards, backing vocals, keybass; Ric Parnell – drums, percussion; Chris Farlowe – vocals; Johnny Mandala – guitar	Nice 'n' Greasy (1973)
1974–1975	Vincent Crane – keyboards, backing vocals; Sam Sampson – vocals; Andy Johnson – guitar; Denny Barnes – guitar; Bob Rennie – bass; Lee Baxter Hayes – drums	none
Band Inactive 1975–1980
1980	Vincent Crane – keyboards, backing vocals, keybass; John Du Cann – guitar, vocals; Preston Heyman – drums	Atomic Rooster (1980)
1980	Vincent Crane – keyboards, backing vocals, keybass; John Du Cann – guitar, vocals, bass; Ginger Baker – drums	none
1980–1982	Vincent Crane – keyboards, backing vocals, keybass; John Du Cann – guitar, vocals; Paul Hammond – drums, percussion	Live at the Marquee 1980 (2002)
1982	Vincent Crane – keyboards, vocals; Paul Hammond – drums, percussion; Mick Hawksworth – bass	none
1982–1983	Vincent Crane – keyboards, vocals; Paul Hammond – drums, percussion; John McCoy – bass	none
1983	Vincent Crane – keyboards, vocals, keybass; Paul Hammond – drums, percussion; Bernie Tormé – guitar	Headline News (1983); Live in Germany 1983 (2000)
1983	Vincent Crane – keyboards, vocals, keybass; Paul Hammond – drums, percussion; John Mizarolli – guitar	Headline News (1983)
Inactive 1983–2016
2016–2017	Pete French – vocals; Steve Bolton – guitar, backing vocals; Christian Madden – keyboards; Shug Millidge – bass; Bo Walsh – drums	none
2017–2020	Pete French – vocals; Steve Bolton – guitar, backing vocals; Shug Millidge – bass; Bo Walsh – drums; Adrian Gautrey – keyboards, backing vocals	none
2020–2023	Pete French – vocals; Steve Bolton – guitar, backing vocals; Shug Millidge – bass; Adrian Gautrey – keyboards, backing vocals; Paul Everett – drums	none
2023–present	Steve Bolton – guitar, backing vocals; Shug Millidge – bass; Adrian Gautrey – keyboards, vocals; Paul Everett – drums	Circle the Sun (2025)
