= Resurrection (Atomic Rooster album) =

Compilation album by Atomic Rooster
- Released: 12 February 2002
- Genre: Hard Rock
- Length: 169:08
- Label: Akarma

Atomic Rooster chronology
Heavy Soul (2001)	Resurrection (2002)	Anthology (2002)

Professional ratings
Review scores
Source	Rating
AllMusic	4.5/5 stars

Resurrection is the 2002 compilation album from English progressive rock band Atomic Rooster. The album comes as a three-disc set, which features songs from Atomic Roooster (1970), Death Walks Behind You (1970) and In Hearing of Atomic Rooster (1971).

== Track listing ==
DISC ONE
No.	Title	Length
1.	"Friday the 13th"	3:31
2.	"And So to Bed"	4:11
3.	"Broken Wings"	5:46
4.	"Before Tomorrow"	5:50
5.	"Banstead"	3:33
6.	"S.L.Y."	4:56
7.	"Winter"	6:59
8.	"Decline and Fall"	5:48
9.	"Play the Game"	4:46
10.	"VUG"	4:33
11.	"Devil's Answer"	4:00

DISC TWO
No.	Title	Length
1.	"Death Walks Behind You"	7:23
2.	"VUG"	5:00
3.	"Tomorrow Night"	4:00
4.	"7 Streets"	6:44
5.	"Sleeping for Years"	5:27
6.	"I Can't Take No More"	3:34
7.	"Nobody Else"	5:01
8.	"Gershatzer"	7:59

DISC THREE
No.	Title	Length
1.	"Breakthrough"	6:18
2.	"Break the Ice"	5:01
3.	"Decision/Indecision"	3:51
4.	"A Spoonful of Bromide Helps the Pulse Rate Go Down"	4:39
5.	"Black Snake"	6:00
6.	"Head in the Sky"	5:40
7.	"The Rock"	4:33
8.	"The Price"	5:17
9.	"Devil's Answer"	3:29
10.	"Breakthrough"	6:09
11.	"Stand by Me"	4:57
12.	"People You Can't Trust"	4:29
13.	"All in Satan's Name"	3:55
14.	"Devil's Answer"	5:49
