= Atomic Rooster (disambiguation) =

Atomic Rooster is a British rock band.

Atomic Rooster may also refer to:

- Atomic Roooster, their 1970 album
- Atomic Rooster (1980 album), their 1980 album
