= Devil's Answer =

1998 live album by Atomic Rooster

Live album (compilation) by Atomic Rooster
- Released: 1998
- Recorded: 1970–1981
- Label: Hux Records

Devil's Answer is a single by British rock band Atomic Rooster from their album, In Hearing of Atomic Rooster (1971). It reached #4 in the UK charts in 1971 - their second hit. It is also a compilation of their live recordings, released in 1998 by Hux Records.

The compilation includes every extant in-studio session the band recorded for BBC Radio, as well as three live in-concert tracks.

All of its contents, except for the three tracks recorded for the Friday Rock Show in 1981, have since been included on Castle Communications' 2004 reissues of Atomic Rooster's first four studio albums. The 1981 tracks remain exclusive to this disc.

The mastering of all in-studio tracks on this disc renders them slower-sounding. The same problem exists on the selections that were used on the 2004 Castle Communications reissues.

In addition, the original lineup of the band, with Nick Graham on bass guitar and vocals, recorded their first BBC session on Alexis Korner's World Service Rhythm & Blues show in December 1969. They performed three tracks from their upcoming first album: "Friday the 13th", "S.L.Y." and "Decline and Fall". This session is now lost.

== Track listing ==
1. "Friday the 13th" (Crane) 4:28 – Mike Harding Show 26.5.70, 1st tx 2.6.70
2. "Seven Lonely Streets" (Du Cann) 6:15 – as above
3. "Tomorrow Night" (Crane) 5:27 – Peel Session 14.1.71
4. "Shabooloo" a.k.a. "Before Tomorrow" (Crane) 6:10 – Mike Harding Show 22.3.71, 1st tx 30.3.71
5. "Death Walks Behind You" (Du Cann, Crane) 6:04 – as above
6. "Stand by Me" (Crane) 3:23 – Johnnie Walker Show 12.6.72, 1st tx 26.6.72
7. "Breakthrough" (Crane, Pat Darnell) 3:06 – as above
8. "Save Me" (Crane) 3:40 – retitled, rearranged "Friday the 13th; "Johnnie Walker Show 7.12.72
9. "Close Your Eyes" (Crane) 2:48 – as above
10. "Play it Again" (Du Cann, Crane) 4:04 – Friday Rock Show 16.10.81, tx 6.11.81
11. "In the Shadows" (Du Cann) 10:01 – as above
12. "Devil's Answer" (Du Cann) 3:46 – as above
13. "People You Can't Trust" (Crane) 4.41 – Live in Concert 27.7.72
14. "A Spoonful of Bromide Helps the Pulse Rate Go Down" (Crane) 4:46 – as above
15. "All in Satan's Name" (Parnell) 4:03 – as above

== Personnel ==
Atomic Rooster

- Vincent Crane – Hammond organ, piano, backing vocals – all tracks
- Carl Palmer – drums, percussion – No. 1, 2
- John Du Cann – guitars, vocals – #1–5, 10–12
- Paul Hammond – drums, percussion – #3–5, 10–12
- Chris Farlowe – vocals – #6–9, 13–15
- Steve Bolton – guitars – #6–9, 13–15
- Ric Parnell – drums, percussion – #6–9, 13–15
