= Live at the Marquee 1980 =

Live album by Atomic Rooster
- Released: 19 November 2002
- Recorded: Marquee Club in 1980
- Genre: Hard rock
- Length: 1:14:46
- Producer: Vincent Crane

Live at the Marquee 1980 is a live album by British rock band Atomic Rooster, recorded at London's Marquee Club. No known live soundboard recordings exist of the 1980 (Crane/Du Cann/Hammond) lineup of Atomic Rooster and the source cassette tape, belonging to Du Cann, was recorded via a single onstage microphone.

== Track listing ==
Live at the Marquee 1980 track listing
No.	Title	Length
1.	"They Took Control of You"	7:15
2.	"Death Walks Behind You"	6:40
3.	"Watch Out!"	4:48
4.	"Tomorrow Night"	6:29
5.	"Seven Lonely Streets"	8:37
6.	"Gershatzer"	10:04
7.	"I Can't Take No More"	8:51
8.	"In the Shadows"	11:24
9.	"Devil's Answer"	5:58
10.	"Do You Know Who's Looking for You?"	4:40
Total length:		74:46

== Personnel ==
Atomic Rooster

- Vincent Crane – Hammond organ, bass pedals
- John Du Cann – guitars, vocals¨¨
- Paul Hammond – drums, percussion
