= The Devil Hits Back =

Compilation album by Atomic Rooster
- Released: 1989
- Genre: Rock

Atomic Rooster chronology
Home to Roost (1977)	The Devil Hits Back (1989)	The Best of Atomic Rooster Volumes 1 & 2 (1992)

The Devil Hits Back is a compilation album by British rock band Atomic Rooster.

Shortly after the death in 1989 of Atomic Rooster founder member Vincent Crane, it was compiled as a tribute by his widow, Jean, and former bandmate John Du Cann.

As well as containing a dozen latter-era Atomic Rooster tracks, all its reissues are rounded out by Atomic Rooster's three Beat-Club appearances, dating from 1971 and 1972. The Beat-Club tracks were later included, with video, on the Masters from the Vaults DVD.

It was originally released by Demi Monde Records in 1989 as a 10-track LP and a 12-track CD. Subsequently, it was reissued on the Pilot/Burning Airlines label in 1999, with the same cover as before, but adding the three live tracks. Most recently, it was reissued in 2008 by Plastic Head Records with a new cover, but the same 15-track listing.

== Track listing ==
The Devil Hits Back track listing
No.	Title	Length
1.	"Devil's Answer"	4:04
2.	"Start to Live" (aka "Rebel with a Clause")	2:56
3.	"Play It Again"	3:14
4.	"They Took Control of You"	4:48
5.	"Lost in Space"	5:51
6.	"Do You Know Who's Looking for You?"	3:04
7.	"Watch Out!"	4:08
8.	"Tomorrow Night"	4:50
9.	"Living Underground" (aka "Night Living")	3:36
10.	"End of the Day"	3:28
11.	"Don't Lose Your Mind"	3:34
12.	"In the Shadows"	6:54
13.	"Friday the 13th" (live 1970)	4:04
14.	"Tomorrow Night" (live 1971)	4:56
15.	"Breakthrough" (live 1972)	4:54
Total length:		64:31
