= The Best of Atomic Rooster Volumes 1 & 2 =

Compilation album by Atomic Rooster
- Released: 20 November 1992
- Recorded: 1971–1982
- Genre: Rock, Progressive rock
- Length: 101:18
- Label: Blueprint

Atomic Rooster chronology
The Devil Hits Back (1989)	The Best of Atomic Rooster Volumes 1 & 2 (1992)	In Satan's Name: The Definitive Collection (1997)

Professional ratings
Review scores
Source	Rating
AllMusic	4/5 stars

The Best of Atomic Rooster Volumes 1 & 2 is a double compilation album by British rock band Atomic Rooster.

It is unofficial and unlicensed; like other such collections, it consists mostly of latter-era, John Du Cann-penned recordings. It was, however, made without any involvement from Du Cann, nor has he ever received any royalties from its sales.

It is particularly notable for the fact that, besides being more representative of that era than similar compilations, it also contains a quantity of previously unissued recordings, of great interest to keen collectors of the band.

It has been issued on at least three separate occasions; the first time was in 1992 on Saraja Records, a subsidiary of Satellite Music Ltd. Satellite Music is owned by Ray Dorset, of Mungo Jerry fame.

As this is only a semi-official release, it could be considered a bootleg of sorts; indeed it has itself been bootlegged twice:

It was repackaged, retitled The Millennium Collection and re-released in 1999 by Digimode Entertainment Ltd. Secondly, in 2000 it was repackaged yet again, retitled simply Anthology and released on the Double Classics/Delta Music label.

Both latter versions used crude noise filtering to suppress the inherent ‘hissiness’ of the source material, but this had the added effect of making them sound duller and less distinct than the original CD issue.

== Track listing ==
=== CD 1 ===
1. "Devil's Answer" 4:12 - dubbed ("live") studio version 1981
2. "Play it Again" 3:12
3. "End of the Day" 3:31
4. "Tomorrow Night" 4:52 - dubbed ("live") studio version 1981
5. "Lost in Space" 5:53
6. "Lose Your Mind" 3:36
7. "Control of You" 4:49
8. "She's My Woman" 3:15
9. "Death Walks Behind You" 7:12 - Death Walks Behind You album version; dubbed from LP
10. "Sleeping for Years" 5:25 - as above; as above
11. "I Can't Take No More" 3:24 - as above; as above

=== CD 2 ===
1. "Do You Know Who's Looking for You" 3:04
2. "Don't Lose Your Mind" 3:36
3. "Watch Out!" 4:06
4. "I Don't Need You Anymore" a.k.a. "I Can’t Stand It" 3:49
5. "He Did it Again" 4:04
6. "The Show" 3:54
7. "Start to Live" a.k.a. "Rebel With a Clause" 2:58
8. "Living Underground" a.k.a. "Night Living" 3:38
9. "End of the Day" 5:25 - full alternate/demo version, incorporating "Moonrise" instrumental 1980
10. "Take it for Granted" a.k.a. "It's so Unkind" 4:07 - unreleased track 1979
11. "Sleepless Nights" a.k.a. "When You go to Bed" 3:46 - unreleased track 1979
12. "Hold it Through the Night" 3:13 - unreleased track 1981
13. "No Change by Me" 3:19 - unreleased track 1981
14. "Throw Your Life Away" 2:54 - "Do You Know Who's Looking for You?" single B-side
