= Assortment =

Assortment may refer to:

- Assortment (assortiment), the parts of a clockwork movement other than the ébauche
- Assortment (album), by Atomic Rooster, 1973

== See also ==
- Law of independent assortment in genetics
- Retail assortment strategies
