= Heavy Soul (Atomic Rooster album) =

Compilation album by Atomic Rooster
- Released: 2001
- Genre: Rock

Atomic Rooster chronology
The First 10 Explosive Years Volume 2 (2001)	Heavy Soul (2001)	Close Your Eyes: A Collection 1965-1986 (2008)

Heavy Soul is a licensed compilation album by Atomic Rooster, a British rock band.

Unlike most other Atomic Rooster compilations, especially those that are unlicensed, it covers the entire period from 1970 to 1974.

It is the first in Castle Communications' definitive series of seven remastered Atomic Rooster CDs, the other five consisting of their studio albums from 1970 to 1973 and a Vincent Crane career overview. All were compiled by music journalist Colin Harper, who also supplied extensive sleeve notes.

It contains the only CD issue to date of both sides of the 1974 Vincent Crane/Chris Farlowe-only 7", "Tell Your Story (Sing Your Song)"/"O.D.". However, these two tracks, originally released on Decca, were subject to a short-term licensing deal between Castle and Universal. This meant that they could not be included on the 2004 reissue of Nice 'n' Greasy; indeed, they were also removed from later pressings of Heavy Soul itself.

In 2005, Heavy Soul was also released as a DVD-Audio DualDisc on Silverline Records, Atomic Rooster's only such disc to date. This version was retitled The Best of and though retaining the same packaging and boasting remixed 5.1 surround sound, it omitted many of the tracks in order to facilitate issue as a single disc.

== Track listing ==
CD 1

1. "Banstead" (Crane/Graham/Palmer) 3:31
2. "Winter" (Crane) 6:58 *
3. "Broken Wings" (Jerome/Grun) 5:46 *
4. "Friday the 13th" (Crane) 3:29 - US version
5. "Tomorrow Night" (Crane) 3:14 - early faded single version
6. "Nobody Else" (Crane/Du Cann) 4:58 *
7. "Devil's Answer" (Du Cann) 3:26
8. "Sleeping for Years" (Du Cann) 5:24 *
9. "Death Walks Behind You" (Du Cann/Crane) 7:28
10. "Breakthrough" (Crane/Darnell) 6:15 *
11. "Break the Ice" (Du Cann) 5:03 *
12. "Black Snake" (Crane/Darnell) 5:57
13. "The Price" (Crane) 5:13 *
14. "Decision/Indecision" (Crane/Darnell) 3:49

CD 2

1. "Head in the Sky" (Du Cann) 5:37
2. "The Rock" (Crane) 4:29
3. "Close Your Eyes" (Crane) 3:47 *
4. "Time Take My Life" (Crane) 5:59 *
5. "Stand by Me" (Crane) 3:45 *
6. "Introduction"/"Breathless" (Crane) 5:16 *
7. "People You Can't Trust" (Crane) 3:52 *
8. "Can't Find a Reason" (Crane) 4:25
9. "Save Me" (Crane) 3:13 – rerecorded, retitled version of "Friday the 13th"
10. "Ear in the Snow" (Crane) 6:12
11. "Never to Lose" (Bolton) 3:16 *
12. "Take One Toke" (Crane) 4:59
13. "All Across the Country" (Crane) 5:09 *
14. "Moods" (Crane) 4:23
15. "Tell Your Story (Sing Your Song)" (Crane) 3:33 +*
16. "O.D." (Crane) 3:12 +*

+Omitted from later CD pressings

*Omitted from 2005 DVD-Audio version
