= Tomorrow Night =

Tomorrow Night may refer to:

In music:

- Tomorrow Night, an album by Charlie Rich
- "Tomorrow Night" (Coslow and Grosz song), 1939
- "Tomorrow Night" (Atomic Rooster song), a song from the 1970 album Death Walks Behind You by Atomic Rooster
- "Tomorrow Night" a 1978 single by Shoes (band)
- "Tomorrow Night", a song from the 1983 film Yentl
- "Tomorrow Night", a song from the 1995 album Coast to Coast Motel by G. Love & Special Sauce

In film:

- Tomorrow Night (film), a 1998 film, screenplay and directed by Louis C.K.

See also

- "Tomorrow Night in Baltimore", a 1971 country song by Roger Miller
