= The First 10 Explosive Years =

Compilation album by Atomic Rooster
- Released: 1999
- Genre: Rock
- Label: Angel Air

Atomic Rooster chronology
In Satan's Name: The Definitive Collection (1997)	The First 10 Explosive Years (1999)	Rarities (2000)

The First 10 Explosive Years is a 1999 compilation album by British rock band Atomic Rooster. It is on the Angel Air record label and, like all their Atomic Rooster and related-artists releases, is derived from original tapes owned and remastered by John Du Cann.

Whilst prog-reviewers cite it as a good compilation that captures some highlights of the band's career, it consists entirely of unlicensed tracks, whose copyright is owned by Sanctuary (who purchased the B&C and Dawn catalogues), EMI and Polydor Records.

It has been reissued and repackaged at least twice: In 2004, it was teamed with The First Ten Explosive Years Volume 2 and released on the Recall Records label (a subsidiary of Snapper Music) as a double CD titled Tomorrow Night.

In 2005, it was reissued on the German Ambitions/Membran International label as disc one in a two-disc set entitled Rebel with a Clause. The second disc was the 11 track reissue of Headline News.

The album features live versions of two of the band's most successful singles, "Devil's Answer" and "Tomorrow Night."

== Track listing ==
The First 10 Explosive Years track listing
No.	Title	Length
1.	"Sleeping for Years"	5:26
2.	"Seven Streets"	6:41
3.	"I Can't Take No More"	3:31
4.	"Taken You Over" (also known as "They Took Control of You")	4:48
5.	"Lost in Space"	5:51
6.	"Play It Again"	3:10
7.	"Devil’s Answer" (live in Milan 1981)	4:09
8.	"Rebel with a Clause" (also known as "Start to Live")	2:56
9.	"Night Living" (also known as "Living Underground")	3:36
10.	"Death Walks Behind You"	7:18
11.	"It's So Unkind"	4:05
12.	"When You Go to Bed"	3:42
13.	"Head in the Sky"	5:38
14.	"Break the Ice"	4:57
15.	"Play the Game"	4:45
16.	"Tomorrow Night" (live studio version 1981)	4:50
Total length:		81:53
