= Made in England (Atomic Rooster album) =

Studio album by Atomic Rooster
- Released: October 1972
- Recorded: 1972
- Studios: Trident Studios, London
- Genres: Blues rock; funk rock; blue-eyed soul
- Length: 44:23
- Labels: Dawn (original UK release); Elektra (original USA release); Brain (original German release); Pye (original Brazilian release); Repertoire (1991 German reissue); Sequel (1991 UK CD reissue); Castle (2004 UK CD reissue)
- Producer: Vincent Crane

Atomic Rooster chronology
In Hearing of Atomic Rooster (1971)	Made in England (1972)	Nice 'n' Greasy (1973)

Alternative cover
- Later pressing

Professional ratings
Review scores
Source	Rating
Allmusic	link

Made in England is the fourth album by British rock band Atomic Rooster. It saw the band moving from their previous generally progressive rock style in more of a funk/soul direction, largely influenced by new singer Chris Farlowe. The album was recorded by an entirely different lineup, apart from founder member Vincent Crane, to that of the band's prior effort, In Hearing of Atomic Rooster. Previous members John Du Cann and Paul Hammond had departed in protest at Crane's intended new musical direction.

In the UK and Germany, original copies of the LP came wrapped in an actual denim sleeve. Later pressings came in a standard art sleeve. In the US, the record was issued on Elektra in the standard sleeve. It was further reissued in Germany in 1977, this time in yet another new sleeve and retitled This is Atomic Rooster.

The only UK single from Made in England was "Stand by Me".

The album reached #60 in Canada.

== Track listing ==
Side one

1. "Time Take My Life" (Crane) 6:01
2. "Stand by Me" (Crane) 3:47
3. "Little Bit of Inner Air" (Parnell) 2:39
4. "Don't Know What Went Wrong" (Crane) 4:00
5. "Never to Lose" (Bolton) 3:17

Side two

1. "Introduction" (Crane) 0:26 - indexed together with "Breathless" on all CDs
2. "Breathless" (Crane) 4:51
3. "Space Cowboy" (Bolton) 3:20
4. "People You Can't Trust" (Crane) 3:53
5. "All in Satan's Name" (Parnell) 4:44
6. "Close Your Eyes" (Crane) 3:49

=== 2004 Castle Music CD reissue bonus tracks ===
11. "Stand by Me" (Crane) 3:24 - BBC Radio Session, 12 June 1972
12. "Breakthrough" (Crane/Pat Darnell) 3:07 - BBC Radio Session, 12 June 1972
13. "Save Me" aka "Friday the 13th" (Crane) 3:42 - BBC Radio Session, 7 December 1972
14. "Close Your Eyes" (Crane) 2:41 - BBC Radio Session, 7 December 1972
15. "Stand by Me" (Crane) 5:00 - BBC Radio 1 Live in Concert, 27 July 1972
16. "People You Can't Trust" (Crane) 4:40 - BBC Radio 1 Live in Concert, 27 July 1972
17. "All in Satan's Name" (Parnell) 4:01 - BBC Radio 1 Live in Concert, 27 July 1972
18. "Devil's Answer" (Du Cann) 7:12 - BBC Radio 1 Live in Concert, 27 July 1972
- Tracks 15 to 18 were previously released on BBC Radio 1 Live in Concert

=== 1991 (and 1995 remastered Digipack) Repertoire Records / 2003 Akarma Records unlicensed CD reissue bonus tracks ===
11. "Goodbye Planet Earth" (Mandala) 4:09 - Nice 'n' Greasy album track
12. "Satan's Wheel" (Crane) 6:40 - as above

== Personnel ==
Atomic Rooster

- Vincent Crane - Hammond organ, piano, ARP synthesizer, keyboard bass
- Chris Farlowe - vocals
- Steve Bolton - guitars
- Ric Parnell - drums, percussion, vocals on "Little Bit of Inner Air"

Additional personnel

- Bill Smith - bass guitar on "Stand by Me"
- Doris Troy and Liza Strike - backing vocals on "Stand by Me" and "People You Can't Trust"

== Charts ==
Chart (1972)	Peak position
Australian Albums (Kent Music Report)	42
Canada Top Albums/CDs (RPM)	60
US Billboard 200	149
