= Circle the Sun =

Studio album by Atomic Rooster
- Released: October 10, 2025
- Genre: Progressive rock, hard rock
- Label: Cherry Red
- Producer: Phil Wilson

Atomic Rooster chronology
Headline News (1983)	Circle the Sun (2025)

Circle the Sun is the eighth studio album by the English rock band Atomic Rooster. The album is the band's first in 42 years since the release of Headline News in 1983. The album was announced on 28 July, 2025 and was released 10 October 2025 through Cherry Red Records.

== Track list ==
Track list adopted from Spotify:

All tracks are written by Steve Bolton and Adrian Gautrey.

No.	Title	Length
1.	"Fly Or Die"	3:45
2.	"Circle The Sun"	3:19
3.	"Never 2 Lose"	5:09
4.	"Walk With Me"	3:01
5.	"Rebel Devil"	3:32
6.	"No More"	3:52
7.	"Pillow"	3:47
8.	"Last Night"	3:05
9.	"First Impression"	4:04
10.	"Blow That Mind"	4:05

== Reception ==
Reviewing the album in Get Ready To Rock, Brian McGowan rated the album 3 1/2 stars, concluding his review with "Fans of the band will enjoy this musical resurrection" and saying "There are no art-rock pretensions with yesterday's or today's Atomic Rooster, and for that we breathe a huge sigh of relief."

Bob Mulvey reviewed the album for The Progressive Aspect, saying "the Rooster feels leaner, meaner, and ready to carry the legacy forward", and praised current keyboardist Adrian Gautrey for his style reminiscent of late Atomic Rooster keyboardist Vincent Crane.

Laurence Todd at Ramzine called it "a fine album indeed" and concluded his review saying it " has the sound and feel of an album Vincent Crane and John DuCann would have been pleased to be involved with. There's no overkill, no extensive soloing, just fine playing from four guys who've captured the early seventies Zeitgeist rather nicely."

== Personnel ==
=== Lineup ===
- Steve Bolton - guitar, vocals
- Adrian Gautrey - keyboards, vocals
- Shug Millidge - bass
- Paul Everett - drums

=== Other personnel ===
- Phil Wilson - producer, additional percussion
