= Close Your Eyes: A Collection 1965–1986 =

Close Your Eyes: A Collection 1965-1986

Compilation album by Vincent Crane
- Released: 2008
- Genre: Rock
- Label: Sanctuary

Vincent Crane chronology
Heavy Soul (2001)	Close Your Eyes: A Collection 1965-1986 (2008)	Anthology 1969-81 (2009)

Close Your Eyes: A Collection 1965–1986 is a career-spanning compilation of Vincent Crane recordings. He was the founder and only constant member of British progressive rock band Atomic Rooster. As well as having 21 of its 37 tracks culled from all of Atomic Rooster's studio albums, it includes several rare and previously unreleased cuts from various Vincent Crane solo and side projects. As with all previous Castle Communications/Sanctuary Records Atomic Rooster CDs, it was compiled by music journalist Colin Harper, who also supplied a detailed biography.

Except where noted, all tracks are performed by Atomic Rooster.

== Track listing ==
Close Your Eyes: A Collection 1965–1986: CD 1 track listing
No.	Title	Length
1.	"Breakthrough"	6:18
2.	"The Rock"	4:31
3.	"Decision/Indecision"	3:50
4.	"Breathless"	4:51
5.	"Tomorrow Night"	3:56
6.	"Gershatzer"	7:58
7.	"Black Snake"	5:59
8.	"Close Your Eyes"	3:49
9.	"Banstead"	3:29
10.	"Satan's Wheel"	6:40
11.	"Nobody Else"	4:58
12.	"Save Me" (retitled, re-recorded version of "Friday the 13th")	3:14
13.	"Can't Find a Reason"	4:34
14.	"Don't Know What Went Wrong"	4:00
15.	"Time Take My Life"	6:01
16.	"Moods"	4:21
Total length:		78:29

Close Your Eyes: A Collection 1965–1986: CD 2 track listing
No.	Title	Length
1.	"My Babe" (Vincent Crane Big Sound 1964)	3:29
2.	"The Silver Meter" (edit; Word Engine 1965)	2:48
3.	"Fanfare/Fire Poem" (Crazy World of Arthur Brown 1968)	2:02
4.	"Fire" (as above)	2:54
5.	"Rest Cure" (as above)	2:46
6.	"Wave Myself Goodbye" (Rory Gallagher 1971)	3:30
7.	"I'm Not Surprised" (as above)	3:37
8.	"Fire Fighter" (Green Goddess, with Rob Burns and Eike Erzmoneit, 1977)	2:39
9.	"Crazy About My Baby" (as above)	3:03
10.	"Taro Rota" (edit; solo demo version 1976)	2:45
11.	"Taro Rota" (Vincent Crane and Arthur Brown 1979)	10:08
12.	"Throw Your Life Away"	2:50
13.	"He Did It Again"	4:03
14.	"Taking a Chance"	3:12
15.	"Land of Freedom"	3:47
16.	"Time"	6:29
17.	"Crane's Train Boogie" (Katmandu, also featuring Peter Green and Ray Dorset, 1984)	3:17
18.	"Sweet Sixteen" (as above)	3:32
19.	"One of Those Things" (Dexys Midnight Runners 1985)	6:01
20.	"Because of You" (as above 1986)	3:11
21.	"Solar Myth/Extro Boogie" (edit; Word Engine 1983)	2:47
Total length:		78:47
