= Anthology 1969–81 =

Anthology 1969-81

Compilation album by Atomic Rooster
- Released: 2009
- Genre: Rock
- Label: Angel Air

Atomic Rooster chronology
Close Your Eyes: A Collection 1965-1986 (2008)	Anthology 1969-81 (2009)

Anthology 1969–81 is a 2009 compilation album by British rock band Atomic Rooster.

It consists mostly of unlicensed tracks, whose copyright is owned by Sanctuary (who purchased the B&C and Dawn catalogues), EMI and Polydor Records.

Professional ratings
Review scores
Source	Rating
Record Collector	3/5 stars

== Track listing ==
Anthology 1969–81: CD 1 track listing
No.	Title	Length
1.	"Devil's Answer" (1970 demo with Carl Palmer)	4:00
2.	"Death Walks Behind You" (Death Walks Behind You album version)	7:18
3.	"VUG" (1970 demo with Carl Palmer)	4:32
4.	"Friday the 13th" (US version; also known as "Save Me")	3:28
5.	"A Spoonful of Bromide Helps the Pulse Rate Go Down" (In Hearing of Atomic Rooster album version)	4:37
6.	"Sleeping for Years" (Death Walks Behind You album version)	5:25
7.	"Seven Lonely Streets" (Death Walks Behind You album version)	6:41
8.	"It's So Unkind" (unreleased track 1979)	4:05
9.	"Head in the Sky" (In Hearing of Atomic Rooster album version)	5:37
10.	"Break the Ice" (In Hearing of Atomic Rooster album version)	4:57
11.	"I Can't Take No More" (Death Walks Behind You album version)	3:31
12.	"Play the Game" (standard single version)	4:45
13.	"When You Go to Bed" (unreleased track 1979)	3:42
14.	"They Took Control of You"	4:48
Total length:		71:35

Anthology 1969–81: CD 2 track listing
No.	Title	Length
1.	"Do You Know Who's Looking for You?"	3:04
2.	"Broken Window"	3:47
3.	"Hold It Through the Night" (unreleased track 1981)	3:09
4.	"No Change by Me" (unreleased track 1981)	3:15
5.	"Play It Again"	3:11
6.	"End of the Day"	3:28
7.	"The Rock" (In Hearing of Atomic Rooster album version)	4:22
8.	"Gershatzer" (Death Walks Behind You album version)	8:00
9.	"Shabooloo" (also known as "Before Tomorrow"; Atomic Roooster album version)	5:47
10.	"Nobody Else" (Death Walks Behind You album version, without backwards vocal intro)	4:42
11.	"Don't Lose Your Mind"	3:35
12.	"She's My Woman"	3:12
13.	"Devil's Answer" (live in Milan 1981)	4:10
14.	"Death Walks Behind You" (live studio version 1981)	5:35
15.	"Tomorrow Night" (live studio version 1981)	4:49
Total length:		68:07
