= Go Your Way =

Go Your Way may refer to:

- "Go Your Way" (CNBlue song), a 2014 single by CNBLUE
- "Go Your Way", a 1969 single by Andromeda
- "Go Your Way", a 1965 song by Les Surfs
- "Go Your Way", a 1975 song by Marion Rung
- "Go Your Way", original 1971 song by Anne Briggs from Anne Briggs
