= Rarities (Atomic Rooster album) =

Compilation album by Atomic Rooster
- Released: 2000
- Genre: Rock
- Label: Angel Air

Atomic Rooster chronology
| The First 10 Explosive Years (1999) | Rarities (2000) | The First 10 Explosive Years Volume 2 (2001) |

Rarities is a compilation album of rare and unreleased material by the British rock band Atomic Rooster.

Whilst being a very good compilation for fans of the band, it includes several unlicensed tracks whose copyright is owned variously by Elektra, EMI, Sanctuary (who purchased the B&C and Dawn catalogues) and Polydor Records. While it is 'endorsed' by former band member John Du Cann, he does not actually own the rights to the 'Atomic Rooster' name; this resides with the estate of late founder member Vincent Crane. Also, although not credited, drummer Preston Heyman appears on the demo versions of the songs that appeared on the 1980 self-titled album.

== Track listing ==
Rarities track listing
| No. | Title | Length |
|---|---|---|
| 1. | "Moonrise" (edited "End of the Day" intro; featured in full on *The Best of Atomic Rooster Volumes 1 & 2*) | 1:06 |
| 2. | "Atomic Alert" (US 1950s B-movie style radio ad 1971) | 0:34 |
| 3. | "Death Walks Behind You" (live studio version 1981) | 5:35 |
| 4. | "VUG" (demo with Carl Palmer 1970) | 4:33 |
| 5. | "Broken Window" (unreleased intended single B-side 1980) | 3:47 |
| 6. | "Alien Alert" (US alien spoof radio ad 1971) | 0:28 |
| 7. | "Throw Your Life Away" (mislabelled 'different mix'; actually standard B-side version 1980) | 2:49 |
| 8. | "Devil’s Alert" (US radio ad 1971) | 0:26 |
| 9. | "Devil’s Answer" (demo with Carl Palmer 1970) | 4:00 |
| 10. | "Do You Know Who’s Looking for You?" (demo 1980) | 2:42 |
| 11. | "Don’t Lose Your Mind" (demo 1980) | 3:32 |
| 12. | "He Did It Again" (demo 1980) | 3:40 |
| 13. | "Backward/Forward Revealed" (intro to "Nobody Else" played backwards and forwards; includes chant with expletives referencing manager Robert Masters) | 0:28 |
| 14. | "End of the Day" (edited, over-modulated alternate/demo version; featured in full on *The Best of Atomic Rooster Volumes 1 & 2*) | 3:45 |
| 15. | "Lost in Space" (demo 1980) | 3:42 |
| 16. | "Hold It Through the Night" (unreleased track 1981) | 3:10 |
| 17. | "No Change by Me" (unreleased track 1981) | 3:15 |
| 18. | "Play It Again" (demo 1981) | 3:58 |
| 19. | "I Can’t Take No More" (live at the Marquee 1980) | 8:57 |
| Total length: | | 69:08 |
