= Heavy Soul =

Heavy Soul may refer to:

- Heavy Soul (Paul Weller album)
- Heavy Soul (Ike Quebec album)
- Heavy Soul (Atomic Rooster album)
