= Nice 'n' Greasy =

Studio album by Atomic Rooster
- Released: September 1973
- Studio: Trident Studios, London; Command Studios, London
- Genre: Blues rock; funk rock; blue-eyed soul
- Length: 42:20
- Label: Dawn (original UK release); Elektra (original USA release); Brain (original German release); Repertoire (1991 German reissue); Sequel (1991 UK CD reissue); Castle (2004 UK CD reissue)
- Producer: Vincent Crane

Atomic Rooster chronology
Made in England (1972)	Nice 'n' Greasy (1973)	Atomic Rooster (1980)

Atomic Rooster IV
- US version

Professional ratings
Review scores
Source	Rating
AllMusic	3/5 stars

Nice 'n' Greasy is the fifth studio album by British rock band Atomic Rooster. It is the only album to include John Goodsall on guitars after the departure of Steve Bolton the previous year. The album failed to chart and the band was dropped from Dawn Records which led to Vincent Crane eventually disbanding the band in 1975 after a tour. The band would enter a hiatus until reforming in 1980.

In the US, the record was issued on Elektra in a different sleeve (pictured) to most territories and retitled Atomic Rooster IV, as their first album, Atomic Roooster (1970), failed to secure a US release. The US album also had a somewhat different track list to the UK version. The German release Nice & Greasy followed the US track listing, but with a phallic art sleeve. It was further reissued in Germany in 1977, this time in yet another new sleeve and retitled This is Atomic Rooster Vol. 2.

== Track listing ==
=== Original UK version ===
Side one

1. "All Across the Country" (Vincent Crane) – 5:10
2. "Save Me" (Crane) – 3:14 re-recorded, retitled version of "Friday the 13th"
3. "Voodoo in You" (Jackie Avery) – 7:04
4. "Goodbye Planet Earth" (Johnny Mandala) – 4:09

Side two

1. "Take One Toke" (Crane) – 4:59
2. "Can't Find a Reason" (Crane) – 4:34
3. "Ear in the Snow" (Crane) – 6:13
4. "Satan's Wheel" (Crane) – 6:39

==== 2004 Castle Music CD reissue bonus tracks ====
9. "What You Gonna Do?" (Farlowe) – 5:23
10. "Moods" (Crane) – 4:20 "Can't Find a Reason" single B-side
11. "The Devil's Answer" (John Du Cann) – 4:09 live in Milan 1981
12. "Throw Your Life Away" (Crane, Du Cann) – 2:49
13. "Do You Know Who’s Looking for You?" single B-side 1980

=== Original US / German version ===
Side one

1. "All Across the Country" (Vincent Crane) – 5:10
2. "Save Me" aka "Friday the 13th" (Crane) – 3:14
3. "Voodoo in You" (Jackie Avery) – 7:04
4. "Moods" (Crane) – 4:20

Side two

1. "Take One Toke" (Crane) – 4:59
2. "Can't Find a Reason" (Crane) – 4:34
3. "Ear in the Snow" (Crane) – 6:13
4. "What You Gonna Do" (Chris Farlowe) – 5:23

== Personnel ==
Atomic Rooster

- Chris Farlowe – vocals
- Vincent Crane – Hammond organ, piano, ARP synthesizer, keyboard bass
- John Goodsall (under the pseudonym Johnny Mandala) – guitars
- Ric Parnell – drums, percussion
