= Atomic Rooster (1980 album) =

Studio album by Atomic Rooster
- Released: September 1980
- Genre: Hard rock; progressive rock; heavy metal
- Length: 42:57
- Label: EMI
- Producer: John Du Cann and Vincent Crane

Atomic Rooster chronology
Nice 'n' Greasy (1973)	Atomic Rooster (1980)	Headline News (1983)

Professional ratings
Review scores
Source	Rating
Allmusic	link

Atomic Rooster is the sixth studio album by British rock band Atomic Rooster. It was recorded when the band regrouped after breaking up for five years, and they embarked on a raw muscular hard rock style, which was in marked contrast to that of their past few albums. In addition, its heavier sound fit in better with the new wave of British heavy metal scene.

Two tracks, "She's My Woman" and "Where's the Show?", were originally recorded by John Du Cann for his solo album, The World's Not Big Enough, in 1977. The album was not released at the time and the songs were later reworked by Atomic Rooster. Du Cann's solo album was eventually released in 1992.

"Do You Know Who's Looking for You?" has been covered by Finnish rock band YUP, who recorded it with new lyrics in their native language and retitled it "Keittoruoka" ("Soup Meal"). It was included on their 2001 album Hajota ja hallitse ("Divide and Conquer").

The 2005 CD reissue, whilst being welcomed by fans of the band's latter era, is, nonetheless, unlicensed. The copyright in the recording is held by the original label, EMI. The Angel Air release featured extensive sleevenotes by Record Collector magazine's Joe Geesin, which included a new interview with John Du Cann. Some of the songs exist in demo form (with Preston Heyman on drums, although not properly credited) on the compilation CD Rarities.

== Track listing ==
Side one

1. "They Took Control of You" (John Du Cann, Clara Du Cann) 4:48
2. "She's My Woman" (Du Cann) 3:12
3. "He Did It Again" (Vincent Crane, Du Cann) 4:03
4. "Where's the Show?" (Du Cann) 3:54
5. "In the Shadows" (Du Cann) 6:55

Side two

1. "Do You Know Who's Looking for You?" (Crane, Du Cann) 3:04
2. "Don't Lose Your Mind" (Du Cann) 3:35
3. "Watch Out!" (Crane) 4:04
4. "I Can't Stand It" (Du Cann) 3:49
5. "Lost in Space" (Crane, Du Cann) 5:51

=== 2005 Angel Air CD reissue bonus tracks ===
11. "Throw Your Life Away" (Crane, Du Cann) 2:54 - "Do You Know Who's Looking for You?" single B-side
12. "Broken Windows" (Crane, Du Cann) 3:49 - unreleased "Don't Lose Your Mind" single B-side

== Personnel ==
Atomic Rooster

- Vincent Crane – Hammond organ, keyboard bass
- John Du Cann – guitars, bass guitar, vocals
- Preston Heyman – drums, percussion

== Singles ==
- "Do You Know Who's Looking for You?" / "Throw Your Life Away" (June 1980). An often rumoured 12" single featuring an extended version of "Do You Know Who's Looking for You?" was never released. No such extended version of the A-side exists.
