= Tomorrow Night (Atomic Rooster song) =

Single by Atomic Rooster

from the album Death Walks Behind You
- B-side: "Play the Game"
- Released: 1970
- Recorded: August 1970
- Genre: Hard rock
- Length: 3:17
- Label: B & C Records
- Songwriter(s): Vincent Crane
- Producer(s): Atomic Rooster

"Tomorrow Night" is a song and single written by Vincent Crane and performed by Atomic Rooster. Released in 1970 and taken from their 1970 album Death Walks Behind You, it reached 11 on the UK charts in 1971, staying there for 12 weeks. It was the first of the group's two UK chart hits. The song is described as "riff-laden" and "gutsy".
