= Stand by Me (Atomic Rooster song) =

Single by Atomic Rooster

from the album Made in England
- Released: 26 May 1972
- Recorded: 1972
- Genre: Rock
- Songwriter(s): Vincent Crane

"Stand by Me" is a 1972 song by English rock band Atomic Rooster. The song was written by the band's keyboard player Vincent Crane. The song was considered the best track off the 1972 Made in England album, and was a hit all over Europe, but narrowly missed the charts in the UK. The song produced a second wave of interest in the band, but was the penultimate single before Atomic Rooster disbanded.
