= The World's Not Big Enough =

Album by John Du Cann

Studio album by John Du Cann
- Released: 1992
- Recorded: 1977
- Genre: Hard rock, proto punk, garage rock, punk rock, new wave
- Label: Angel Air
- Producer: Francis Rossi, John Du Cann

The World's Not Big Enough is the only solo album by John Du Cann, who was best known as guitarist and vocalist with Atomic Rooster and Hard Stuff in the 1970s. The album was recorded in 1977, but remained unreleased until 1992, and was remastered in 1999.

== Recording ==
During the mid-1970s, Du Cann was signed to Quarry Management, who also handled Status Quo. When Du Cann presented some demo tracks to Arista Records, it was suggested that he record them in a studio with Status Quo guitarist Francis Rossi acting as producer. A group was assembled to record the album, including bass guitarist John McCoy, who later played with Ian Gillan; Liverpool Express and Original Mirrors and future Status Quo drummer Pete Kircher, and keyboard player Andy Bown who was signed to EMI Records but also performed with Status Quo, prior to being a full member in 1982. Ex-Atomic Rooster drummer Paul Hammond also played on several tracks. The band subsequently performed concerts in London, but Arista ultimately decided not to release the album.

The album was eventually released in 1992, and featured Du Cann's 1979 UK hit single "Don't Be a Dummy", which he performed on Top of the Pops. The 1999 CD version also featured a number of bonus tracks, mostly demos and rough versions of songs not featured on the original album.

"She's My Woman" and "Where's the Show!" were re-recorded when Du Cann rejoined Atomic Rooster, and were released on the band's 1980 album Atomic Rooster.

== Reception ==
Professional ratings
Review scores
Source	Rating
Allmusic	3/5 stars

Richie Unterberger of Allmusic described The World's Not Big Enough as "peculiar, though not half-bad, power pop/new wave with a mainstream slant", although he described the bonus tracks as "closer to hard rock in mood".

== Track listing ==
- All tracks written by John Du Cann unless stated.
1. "Don't Be a Dummy" (Ronnie Bond) – 3:05
2. "You Didn't Know Any Better" – 3:23
3. "Fashion Fantasy" – 2:34
4. "When I Was Old" – 2:35
5. "Only One Night" – 3:00
6. "Where's the Show!" – 2:25
7. "She's My Woman" – 2:30
8. "Throw Him in Jail" – 2:28
9. "Evil You (Part 1)" – 2:42
10. "Don't Talk" – 2:25
11. "Your Application Failed" – 2:52
12. "If I'm Makin'" – 2:58
13. "Street Strutter" – 2:22
14. "Evil You (Part 2)" – 2:42
15. "Hesitation" – 2:26

=== Bonus tracks ===
16. "Exodus (Johnny and His Epic Guitars)" (Ernest Gold) – 2:41
17. "Moody Child" – 3:24
18. "Truck Stop" – 2:48
19. "Well Let's Go" – 3:56
20. "Paradise" – 2:47
21. "I Want to Be Alone" – 2:28
22. "Ode to Mai West" – 2:30
23. "Wise Man" – 2:56
24. "Ooh Be Doo" – 3:39
25. "Thanx for Nothing" – 3:59
26. "Who Cares?" – 2:07
27. "The Door" – 0:21

== Personnel ==
- John Du Cann – guitar, vocals; bass guitar on tracks 16–25
- Francis Rossi – guitar on tracks 1–15 & 26
- John McCoy – bass guitar on tracks 1–15 & 26
- Andy Bown – keyboards on tracks 1–15 & 26
- Pete Kircher – drums, percussion on tracks 1–15 & 26
- Paul Hammond – drums, percussion on tracks 13 & 16–25
- Produced by Francis Rossi and John Du Cann
- Remastered by Nick Watson
