= In Hearing of Atomic Rooster =

In Hearing of

Studio album by Atomic Rooster
- Released: August 1971
- Recorded: Summer 1971
- Genres: Progressive rock; hard rock
- Length: 41:42
- Labels: Pegasus (original UK release); Elektra (original USA release); Philips (original European release); Repertoire (1990 & 1995 German CD reissues)
- Producers: Vincent Crane & Atomic Rooster

Atomic Rooster chronology
Death Walks Behind You (1970)	In Hearing of (1971)	Made in England (1972)

Professional ratings
Review scores
Source	Rating
Allmusic	link

In Hearing of is the third album by British rock band Atomic Rooster. It went to number 18 on the UK chart, helped along by the band's "Devil's Answer" single, which was not included on the album, but was released just prior to it and became the band's highest chart success at number 4 in the UK. The album reached #45 in Canada.

The four musicians pictured on the inside cover never played together. Half the songs were written by Crane and his first wife, Pat Darnell, who assisted with the lyrics. The backing tracks (and some vocals) were recorded by Vincent Crane, John Cann and Paul Hammond, but Cann and Hammond were let go from the group soon after vocalist Pete French was drafted in. The album's overall sound is dominated by Crane and Hammond, with many of Cann's guitar parts either not used or placed lower in the mix. However, Cann's guitars are still prominent on his compositions (tracks 2 and 6) and the instrumentals (tracks 4 and 7).

== Track listing ==
=== Original version ===
Side one

1. "Breakthrough" (Vincent Crane, Pat Darnell) 6:18
2. "Break the Ice" (John Cann) 4:59
3. "Decision/Indecision" (Crane, Darnell) 3:50
4. "A Spoonful of Bromide Helps the Pulse Rate Go Down" (Crane) 4:38

Side two

1. "Black Snake" (Crane, Darnell) 6:00
2. "Head in the Sky" (Cann) 5:38
3. "The Rock" (Crane) 4:31
4. "The Price" (Crane, Darnell) 5:16

=== Original U.S. version ===
Side one

1. "Breakthrough"
2. "Break the Ice"
3. "Decision/Indecision"
4. "A Spoonful of Bromide Helps the Pulse Rate Go Down"
5. "Devil's Answer" – U.S. Version with Pete French overdubbed vocals

Side two

1. "Black Snake"
2. "Head in the Sky"
3. "The Rock"
4. "The Price"

==== 1990 (and 1995 remastered Digipack) Repertoire Records CD reissue bonus track ====
9. "Devil's Answer" (Cann) 3.28 – original single version 1971

==== 2004 Castle Music CD reissue bonus tracks ====
9. "Devil's Answer" (Cann) 3:28 – US version with overdubbed Pete French vocals 1971
10. "Breakthrough" 7:20 – Live in Concert 1972
11. "A Spoonful of Bromide Helps the Pulse Rate Go Down" 4:46 – Live in Concert 1972

==== 2001 Akarma Records unlicensed CD reissue bonus tracks ====
9. "Devil's Answer" (Cann) 3.28 – original single version 1971
10. "Breakthrough" (Crane, Darnell) 6:10 – Live in Concert 1972
11. "Stand by Me" (Crane) 4:57 – as above
12. "People You Can't Trust" (Crane) 4:29 – as above
13. "All in Satan's Name" (Ric Parnell) 3:56 – as above
14. "Devil's Answer" (Cann) 5:39 – as above

== Personnel ==
Atomic Rooster

- Vincent Crane – Hammond organ, keyboard bass (all tracks), piano (1, 3, 4), vocals (5, 8)
- John Cann – guitars (all but 3)
- Pete French – vocals (1–3, 6, 8)
- Paul Hammond – drums, percussion (all tracks)

North American Tour, 1971

- Vincent Crane – Hammond organ, electric piano, keyboard bass
- Pete French – vocals
- Steve Bolton – guitar
- Ric Parnell – drums

== Charts ==
Chart (1971)	Peak position
Canada Top Albums/CDs (RPM)	45
UK Albums (Official Charts)	18
US Billboard 200	167
