= Andromeda (English band) =

English psychedelic rock group formed in 1966

- Origin: London, England
- Genres: Psychedelic rock, freakbeat, acid rock, progressive rock, hard rock
- Years active: 1966–1969
- Past members: John Du Cann; Mick Hawksworth; Jack McCulloch; Ian McLane

Andromeda were an English psychedelic rock group, that formed in 1966. However, soon after formation, the band changed lineup, and led by John Du Cann a new line-up recorded their eponymous album in 1969, with backing vocals by Eddie Dyche.

The group split upon Du Cann's departure to join Atomic Rooster in 1970.

Du Cann, Hawksworth, and Collins also comprised the one-off studio band The Five Day Week Straw People. Hawksworth later briefly joined Killing Floor and was a member of Fuzzy Duck.

In September 2017, a copy of their first album sold for over £1,000 (US$1,200) on Discogs.

== Band members ==
- John Du Cann – lead vocals, guitar
- Mick Hawksworth – bass (born Michael Hawksworth, 1948, England died 28 January 2017 near Axminster, Devon)
- Jack McCulloch (aka Jack Collins) – drums
- Ian McLane – drums

== Discography ==
=== Singles ===
- "Go Your Way" / "Keep out 'Cos I'm Dying" (RCA Victor) 1969

=== Albums ===
- Andromeda (RCA Victor) 1969
- 7 Lonely Street (Reflection) 1990
- Anthology 1966-1969 (Kissing Spell) 1994
- Live at Middle Earth (Kissing Spell) 1994
- Originals (Angel Air) 2005
- Beginnings 1967-68 (Angel Air) 2007

=== Compilation albums ===
- See into the Stars (SAR.CD 003-4) 1990
- Return to Sanity (Background) 1992
- Definitive Collection (Angel Air) 2000

The original album was re-released in 2000 as a two disc set that contained that album and a number of demos, singles, and live recordings under the name of Definitive Collection.
