= Paul Hammond (musician) =

English drummer (1952–1992)

Background information
- Born: 1952; Marlow, Buckinghamshire, England
- Died: 1992 (aged 39–40) London, England
- Genres: Progressive rock, hard rock
- Occupations: Drummer, composer
- Instruments: Drums, percussion
- Years active: 1964–1992
- Formerly of: Atomic Rooster, Hard Stuff

Paul Hammond (1952–1992) was an English rock drummer who was a member of the progressive rock band Atomic Rooster and the hard rock band Hard Stuff during the 1970s.

== Career ==
Born in Marlow, Buckinghamshire, Hammond began playing drums aged 12, and joined his first band, The Farm, after winning a competition in the Melody Maker music newspaper.

When Atomic Rooster drummer Carl Palmer left the group to form Emerson, Lake & Palmer in the summer of 1970, he was replaced briefly by Ric Parnell before Hammond was recruited as a permanent replacement in August, joining vocalist / guitarist John Cann and keyboard player Vincent Crane. The band subsequently recorded the Death Walks Behind You album in September of that year, followed by the hit singles "Tomorrow Night" and "Devil's Answer". After the recording of In Hearing of Atomic Rooster in the summer of 1971, Hammond left the band after Cann was fired by Crane. Parnell subsequently rejoined the band as drummer.

Hammond and Cann joined forces with singer Al Shaw and bass guitarist John Gustafson to form Daemon, later changing the name to Bullet, and then Hard Stuff. Hammond recorded two albums with Hard Stuff before the band split up in 1973. That year he suffered serious leg injuries in a car accident in Belgium, and spent two years recovering.

In 1977 Hammond was a member of T.H.E. with Pete Newnham (Cockney Rebel) and Mike Marchant (Third Ear Band), and an unsuccessful single, "Rudi", was released under the name of Pete Newnham. Hammond later joined The Intellektuals, an art punk band from London, led by Jack Hues and Nick Feldman. After the group split in 1978, Hues and Feldman formed Wang Chung. Hammond then worked on John Du Cann's solo album (Cann having added the "Du" to his name), and in 1980 he rejoined Atomic Rooster, which now once again consisted of Hammond, Du Cann and Crane. After Du Cann had left again, and the band recorded the unsuccessful Headline News album in 1983, they disbanded for good.

Hammond died in 1992 or 1993 in London from an accidental drug overdose, having suffered with alcoholism for many years.

== Discography ==
=== Atomic Rooster ===
- Death Walks Behind You (1970)
- In Hearing of Atomic Rooster (1971)
- Headline News (1983)

=== Hard Stuff ===
- Bulletproof (1972)
- Bolex Dementia (1973)

=== John Du Cann ===
- The World's Not Big Enough (1977, released 1992)
