= Steve Bolton =

Musician

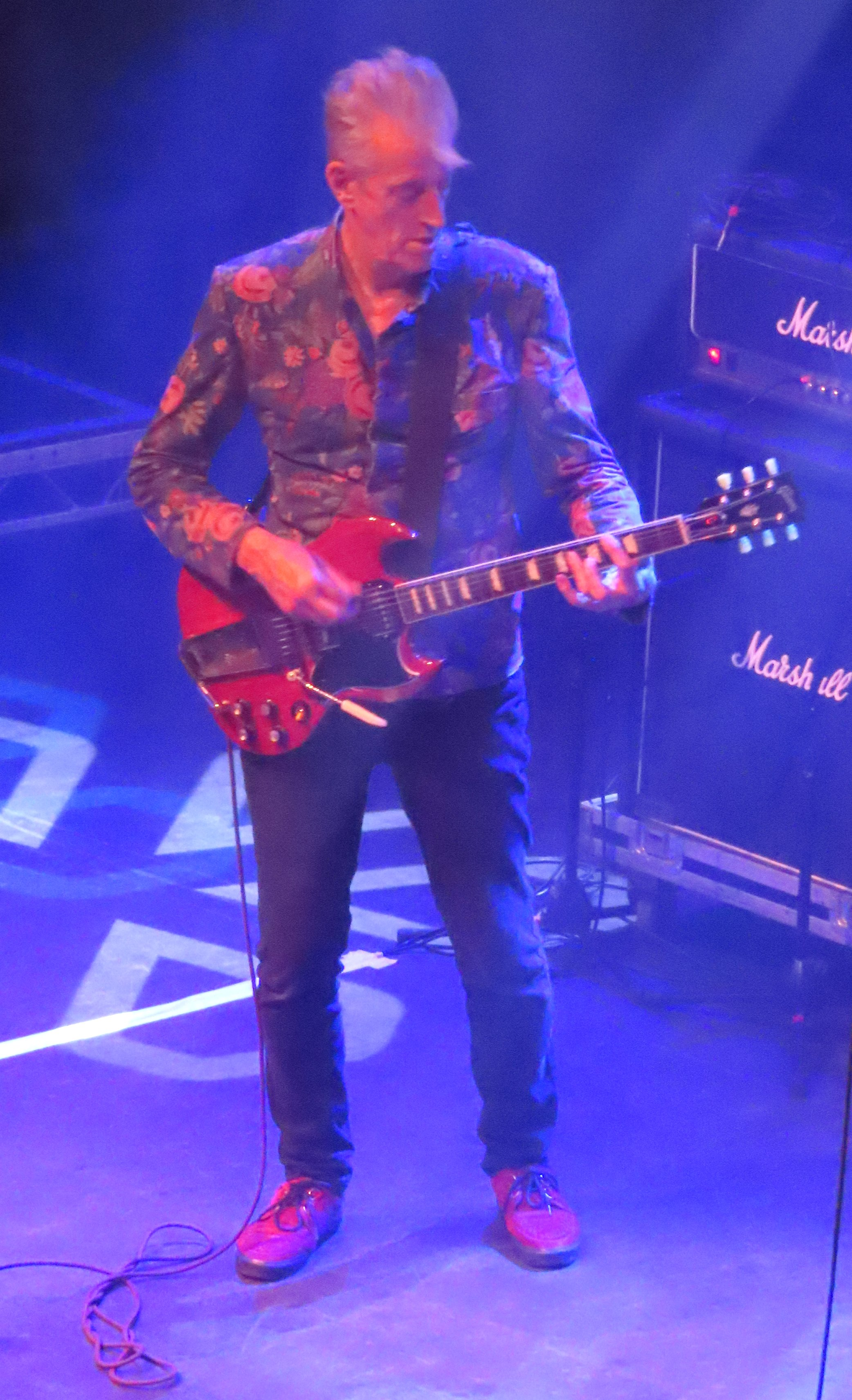
- Bolton with Atomic Rooster in 2021.

Background information
- Also known as: Boltz
- Born: Stephen Bolton; 8 November 1949 (age 76); Manchester, England
- Genres: Progressive rock, hard rock
- Occupation: Musician
- Instrument: Guitar
- Member of: Atomic Rooster
- Formerly of: The Who
- Spouse: Louise Bolton
- Website: www.steveboltz.co.uk

Steve Bolton (born 8 November 1949), also known as Boltz, is an English rock musician who, since the start of his career in the 1960s, has played guitar on video, film and television and recorded as well as toured with a number of well-known artists.

== Music career ==
A native of Manchester, Steve Bolton played rhythm guitar with The Dominators, The Phantom 4, Modrox from 1963, and lead guitar in Puzzle from 1966, Jimmy Powell and The Dimensions, The Dimensions. In 1971 he was recruited into the band Atomic Rooster, part of a new line-up for a tour supporting the band's third album In Hearing of Atomic Rooster and their No. 4 charting single "The Devil's Answer". The tour was successful, and included a charity gig where the band supported The Who. The band was also recording their fourth LP Made in England which was released in 1972 with a more funky sound replacing their original progressive rock leanings. Bolton also appeared on Devil's Answer: Live on the BBC released in 1998, and on the release of In Satan's Name: The Definitive Collection.

Bolton left Atomic Rooster at the end of 1972 and joined the band Headstone, appearing on their albums Bad Habits in 1974 and Headstone in 1975. After leaving Headstone, he played with 20th Century and then continued working as a musician, recording and touring with a number of different artists. In 1982, he joined the band Vampire Bats, also in the 1980s he was a member of Paul Young band The Royal Family and played on some of his albums including No Parlez, in 1984 he played with K4, and in 1988 Richard Strange and the Engine Room.

In 1989 Bolton went on tour with The Who, playing lead guitar as one of twelve supporting musicians on the band's 25th Anniversary tour. A performance of the rock opera Tommy at Los Angeles' Universal Amphitheatre, including special guests Elton John, Billy Idol, Phil Collins, Patti LaBelle and Steve Winwood, was broadcast on television and later released as a video.

In the 1990s Bolton formed his own band 6Foot3 with Jim Kimberley (drums) and brother Bob Kimberley (bass) as well as session work/tours with artists including Belinda Carlisle, William Sheller and Scott Walker. He also performed on several tracks for the album 'Water Under the Bridge' by Peter Marsh, notably New Man.

In July 2016, Steve played in a reformed line-up of Atomic Rooster with vocalist Pete French. Currently has his own original trio Dead Man's Corner. He is happily married to his second wife Louise.

== Discography ==
Steve Bolton has recorded with a number of well-known artists. His discography includes:

With The Who

- Join Together (1990)
- Thirty Years of Maximum R&B [Disc 4, track 19] (1994)
- Greatest Hits Live [Disc 2, tracks 1–5] (2010)

With Atomic Rooster

- Made in England (1972)
- Devil's Answer (1972)
- In Satan's Name: The Definitive Collection (1997)
- Circle the Sun (2025)

With Paul Young

- No Parlez (1983)
- The Secret of Association (1985)
- Between Two Fires (1986)
- Other Voices (1990)
- Come Back and Stay (single remix version)/Yours (single) (1983)
- Love of the Common People (Extended Club Mix) (maxi, single) (1983)
- Wherever I Lay My Hat (1983)
- I'm Gonna Tear Your Playhouse Down (maxi, single) (1984)

With others

- "High on You" (7", promo) (1974)
- "International Language" (single) (1981)
- The Phenomenal Rise of Richard Strange (LP, album) (1981)
- "Tomb of Memories" (Maxi, Single) (1985)
- Going, Gone (LP, Album) (1986)
- Inside (CD, Album) (1986) (Matthew Sweet)
- My Place (Album) (1989)
- Bowling in Paris (Album, 1989) (Stephen Bishop)
- Engelberg (Album) (1991)
- Privilège (CD) (1992)
- Rock Legends (4xCD, Comp + Box)(1992)
- Albion (Album) (1994) (William Sheller)
- "Diggin' On You" (Maxi) (1995)
- Broken China (Album) (1996) (Rick Wright)
- Other People's Lives (CD) (2006)
- Other People's Lives (CD, Promo) (2006)
- Water Under the Bridge (Album by Peter Marsh, recorded in the 1990s, released in 2021)

== Filmography ==
Steve Bolton has appeared in musical films and videos, including:

- Tommy and Quadrophenia Live: The Who (2005)
- The Who Live at Giants Stadium (1989)
- The Who Live, Featuring the Rock Opera Tommy (1989)
- Hearts of Fire (1987)
- The Who: Thirty Years of Maximum R&B Live (1994)
- Masters from the Vaults (Atomic Rooster DVD, 2003)
