= Headline News (album) =

Studio album by Atomic Rooster
- Released: June 1983
- Recorded: 1982–1983
- Genre: Progressive rock; new wave
- Label: Towerbell Records

Atomic Rooster chronology
Atomic Rooster (1980)	Headline News (1983)	Circle the Sun (2025)

Headline News is the seventh studio album by British rock band Atomic Rooster.

It has been released on CD several times: firstly in 1994 on Voiceprint, secondly in 1997 on Blueprint and in 2002 on Eagle. In 2004 it was repackaged by Dutch label MCP as Future Shock. In addition, in 2005 the German Ambitions/Membran International label packaged it alongside The First Ten Explosive Years as a two-disc set entitled Rebel with a Clause.

All CD issues feature two bonus tracks not included on the original LP.

Vincent Crane's wife, Jean, contributes lyrics to three tracks, including "Watch Out!/Reaching Out", an adaptation of the Atomic Rooster album cut. The album was recorded at the Cranes' home in Maida Vale, with the help of a mobile studio parked outside, and the sessions engineered by Tom Newman, remembered for his production work on Mike Oldfield's Tubular Bells album. Paul Hammond used electronic Yamaha drums for the recording of the drum tracks.

== Track listing ==
All tracks composed by Vincent Crane; except where noted

Side one

1. "Hold Your Fire" - 4:51
2. "Headline News" - 5:16
3. "Taking a Chance" - 3:08
4. "Metal Minds" (Vincent Crane, Jean Crane) - 4:27
5. "Land of Freedom" - 3:47

Side two

1. "Machine" - 5:26
2. "Dance of Death" - 4:29
3. "Carnival" - 4:34
4. "Time" (Vincent Crane, Jean Crane) - 6:30

=== CD reissue bonus tracks ===
10. "Future Shock" (John Mizarolli) - 4:23
11. "Watch Out!/Reaching Out" (Vincent Crane, Jean Crane) - 5:09

== Singles ==
- "Land of Freedom" / "Carnival" (May 1983). A 12" single was released with an extended version of "Land of Freedom".

== Personnel ==
Atomic Rooster

- Vincent Crane - lead vocals (all tracks), backing vocals (track 2), Hammond organ, piano, Prophet 5, minimoog, clavinet, keyboard bass, percussion (track 7)
- Paul Hammond - drums (all tracks), percussion (tracks 5, 6, 9)

Additional personnel

- David Gilmour - guitars (tracks 1, 4, 5, 9)
- John Mizarolli - guitars (tracks 2, 3, 10)
- Bernie Tormé - guitars (track 5, 6, 8, 11)
- Tareena Craze - backing vocals (tracks 5, 6, 8), choir (track 7)
- Jean Crane - choir (track 7)
- Jon Field - percussion (track 7)
