= Retail assortment strategies =

Assortment strategies are used by retailers in brick-and-mortar and ecommerce to decide on a daily basis how to allocate inventory to their stores as part of their merchandise planning processes. Such strategies are integral for retailers because they directly affect how their customers interact with their merchandise, and therefore, their brand. The decisions that these strategies help make are what to sell, where to sell it, when to sell it, whom to sell it to, and how much to sell.

== Deep assortment ==
A company that utilizes a deep assortment to compete in a market does so by carrying a vast array of colors, sizes and other options of a particular category. An example of this could be an athletic shoe store. They will carry a large assortment of athletic shoes in a wide range of sizes and colors, sometimes to the point of exhausting all possible options, but they will not carry a women's sandal.

== Wide assortment ==
Conversely, a wide assortment strategy is one that aims to have at least one of every product category. The product categories themselves are not meant to be very specialized. An example of this could be found at a neighborhood hardware store. They will likely have a toilet seat available for sale there, but it would not be anywhere the number available through a plumbing store or a Home Depot. The goal here is to provide a little of everything rather than a lot of one thing.

== Scrambled assortment ==
A scrambled assortment strategy is used to attract customers outside of a company's main target audience by offering products outside of its core offering. An example of this might be an ice cream shop that chooses to also offer frozen yogurt or Italian ice in order to attract people who are not looking for ice cream. By doing so, they are able to provide service to more people than they otherwise would by pulling in members from other markets as well.

== Localized assortment ==
A localized assortment strategy is one that optimizes inventory based on a particular store's location. A location of a store in Nashville for example would carry different products than a store in Seattle. Clothing stores do this often for seasonality reasons, as well as hardware stores – selling boots and shovels in cold climates and sandals and sprinklers in more temperate areas. This can often be difficult to successfully implement because of all the numerous nuances in anticipating changes in cultures, climates, and local events. When it is done successfully, however, customers feel like they are getting a more specialized assortment offering because it has essentially been personalized for their anticipated needs. Companies that utilize these types of assortments also typically will use predictive analytics to assist in their decisions.

== Mass market assortment ==
Stores that want to offer an assortment that appeals to the mass market, in that there is a large assortment of products available in a wide variety of options, aims to cover all bases so that anyone looking for something could come in find what they need. Examples of stores that utilize a mass market assortment would be Walmart, Target, Amazon, or Home Depot. The goal here is to offer as much as possible to as many people as possible.

== Assortment optimization ==
Assortment planning is the process to determine what and how much should be carried in a merchandise category. Retail assortment can also respond to local competition. A study of Best Buy and Circuit City stores found that product variety increased when a rival was present in the market, but decreased when competing stores were located within one mile of each other; nearby rivals also differentiated their product ranges more strongly. Assortment plan is a trade-off between the breadth and depth of products that a retailer wishes to carry. Assortment optimization refers to the problem of selecting a set of products to offer to a group of customers to maximize the revenue that is realized when customers make purchases according to their preferences. Assortment affects costs because it drives inventory decisions. Poorly conceived inefficient assortments raise inventory costs and waste valuable shelf space. Assortment optimization is essential to a wide variety of application domains that includes retail, online advertising, and social security. The process brings order out of the mind-numbing complexity of thousands of SKUs across scores of markets and retailers. This process demands internal alignment within manufacturers and retailers before they enter into a collaborative process with one another. Like inventory optimization, assortment optimization too takes demand and supply volatility into account.
