= Death Walks Behind You =

Studio album by Atomic Rooster
- Released: September 1970
- Recorded: August 1970
- Genres: Progressive rock; hard rock; proto-metal
- Length: 45:27
- Labels: B&C (original UK release); Elektra (original USA release); Philips (original German release); Repertoire (1990 & 2000 German reissues); Akarma (2006 Italian reissue)
- Producer: Atomic Rooster

Atomic Rooster chronology
Atomic Roooster (1970)	Death Walks Behind You (1970)	In Hearing of Atomic Rooster (1971)

Professional ratings
Review scores
Source	Rating
AllMusic	4.5/5 stars
The Rolling Stone Record Guide	1/5 stars

Death Walks Behind You is the second studio album by British rock band Atomic Rooster, released in September 1970. It was their first album to receive a US release, albeit in a different sleeve. It is commonly thought of as the archetypal Atomic Rooster album, recorded by the 'classic' line-up of Vincent Crane, John Du Cann and Paul Hammond. Certainly it is their most successful album, critically and commercially, and often hailed as a classic of the progressive rock genre. It produced the hit single "Tomorrow Night" (UK No. 11), which became one of the band's best-known songs. The album cover features the William Blake monotype Nebuchadnezzar. Band photos were taken at Churchfield Road Cemetery, Acton W3, by former actor-turned photographer Richard Lyon.

== Reception ==
In a retrospective review of 2011, Raffaella Berry wrote, "Though not exactly flawless, Death Walks Behind You is an impressive offering that is almost a must-listen for Hammond fans and anyone who likes their prog with a harder edge (though not necessarily metal). A fascinating, almost addictive album by an underrated band, whose long but chequered career ended tragically with Vincent Crane's death in 1989."

== Track listing ==
Side 1
No.	Title	Writer(s)	Length
1.	"Death Walks Behind You"	John Du Cann, Vincent Crane	7:28
2.	"Vug"	Crane	4:57
3.	"Tomorrow Night"	Crane	3:56
4.	"7 Streets (also called "Seven Lonely Streets")"	Du Cann	6:40

Side 2
No.	Title	Writer(s)	Length
5.	"Sleeping for Years"	Du Cann	5:24
6.	"I Can't Take No More"	Du Cann	3:32
7.	"Nobody Else"	Crane, Du Cann	4:58
8.	"Gershatzer"	Crane	7:58
Total length:			45:27

2004 Castle Music CD reissue bonus tracks
No.	Title	Writer(s)	Notes	Length
9.	"Play the Game"	Du Cann	Tomorrow Night B-side 1971	4:42
10.	"The Devil's Answer"	Du Cann	Demo with Carl Palmer 1970	3:59
11.	"Tomorrow Night"	Crane	BBC Radio Session 1971	5:28
12.	"Shabooloo aka Before Tomorrow"	Crane, Du Cann	BBC Radio Session 1971	6:05
13.	"Death Walks Behind You""	Crane, Du Cann	BBC Radio Session 1971	6:06
14.	"Devil's Answer"	Du Cann	original single version 1971	3:26
Total length:				–

2006 Akarma Records unlicensed CD reissue bonus tracks
No.	Title	Writer(s)	Notes	Length
15.	"Tomorrow Night"	Crane	BBC Radio Session 1971	5:27
16.	"Shabooloo"	Crane, Du Cann	BBC Radio Session 1971	6:10
17.	"Death Walks Behind You"	Crane, Du Cann	BBC Radio Session 1971	6:04
18.	"The Rock"	Crane	In Hearing of Atomic Rooster album track	4:32
Total length:				–

== Personnel ==
Atomic Rooster

- John Du Cann – guitars, lead vocals
- Vincent Crane – Hammond organ, piano, keyboard bass, backing vocals
- Paul Hammond – drums, percussion

== Charts ==
Chart (1971)	Peak position
Australian Albums (Kent Music Report)	13
Canada Top Albums/CDs (RPM)	44
German Albums (Offizielle Top 100)	40
UK Albums (Official Charts)	12
US Billboard 200	90
