= Nick Graham (musician) =

British musician

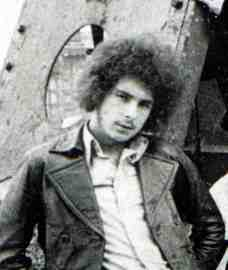

Background information
- Genres: Progressive rock
- Occupations: Musician; songwriter
- Instruments: Vocals; bass; flute; keyboards; guitar

Nick Graham is a British vocalist, songwriter, flautist, pianist and bassist. He was one of the original members of the English progressive rock band Atomic Rooster from 1969 to 1970.

== Career ==
Graham founded Atomic Rooster with Vincent Crane and Carl Palmer in 1969, and appeared on the band's first album. He then joined Skin Alley, with whom he performed on three albums before the band broke up in 1974. Afterward, he toured with Edwin Starr.

In 1977, Graham formed Alibi, as a songwriting project with drummer Tony Knight, who was later replaced by Charlie Morgan. The group recorded an album produced by Muff Winwood and Rhett Davies at Island’s Basing Street Studio, which was never released. Much of it was re-recorded with Chris Rea as producer in 1980 and this became the album “Friends” released on the Magnet label. The title song "Friends" became a radio hit.

In 1985, Graham performed as part of the Explorers with former Roxy Music members Phil Manzanera and Andy Mackay. He subsequently began songwriting for other artists, including the Cheap Trick No.1 US and International hit single "The Flame", which he co-wrote with Bob Mitchell in 1988, as well as "Remember My Name" for House of Lords, which reached No. 72 on the Hot 100 in 1990. Other notable writing credits include “I'll Cry for You” for Europe (co-written with Joey Tempest), and songs on Toyah’s 1987 Album Desire.

He has since performed with David Jackson, Jess Roden, the Reduced Shakespeare Company and the Jim Capaldi and The Outside.
