= Preston Heyman =

British drummer and percussionist

- Genres: Pop; rock
- Occupation: Musician
- Instruments: Drums, percussion
- Years active: 1971–present

Preston Heyman is a British record producer, drummer and percussionist.

He is credited on the Kate Bush album Never for Ever. Not too long afterwards, he was recruited to be the drummer for Atomic Rooster's reformation, and appeared on their self-titled comeback album Atomic Rooster (1980).

In May 1983, he played with the Waterboys on their first public appearance on The Old Grey Whistle Test. He also played on "The Three Day Man" on the 12 inch single of "December"

He played Oriental percussion instruments on the track "Blood Sucking" of Mike Oldfield's soundtrack for the film The Killing Fields, released in 1984.

He played drums on the single "Wishing Well" from the 1987 album Introducing the Hardline According to Terence Trent D'Arby.
