= Atomic Roooster =

Studio album by Atomic Rooster
- Released: February 1970
- Recorded: December 1969 – January 1970
- Genre: Progressive rock
- Length: 40:14
- Labels: B&C (original UK release); Fontana (original European release); Repertoire (1991 German reissue)
- Producers: Atomic Rooster; Tony Colton (tracks 1 and 7)

Atomic Rooster chronology
Atomic Roooster (1970)	Death Walks Behind You (1970)

Singles from Atomic Roooster
- 1. "Friday the 13th" Released: 13 March 1970

Professional ratings
Review scores
Source	Rating
Allmusic	link

Atomic Roooster [sic], also spelled Atomic Ro-o-oster on some later CD reissues, is the first album by British rock band Atomic Rooster, with keyboardist Vincent Crane, bassist and vocalist Nick Graham and drummer Carl Palmer.

A few weeks after its release, guitarist and vocalist John Du Cann joined and Nick Graham, the original vocalist and bassist, left. Du Cann subsequently overdubbed three of the album's tracks for a projected US release. However, the album never saw US release and the overdubbed tracks eventually surfaced on a second pressing of the album in the UK (though with no corrections to the album credits), and subsequent CD reissues.

On the Australian pressing on Interfusion, the rooster's breasts were painted over with feathers on the cover. The South African edition was similarly censored, albeit only the rooster's nipples were airbrushed over.

The album was reissued on vinyl in 2016.

== Track listing ==
=== Original UK LP and 2016 reissue ===
Side one

1. "Friday the 13th" (Crane) 3:31
2. "And So to Bed" (Crane) 4:09
3. "Broken Wings" (John Mayall) 5:47
4. "Before Tomorrow" (Crane) 5:52

Side two

5. "Banstead" (Crane, Graham, Palmer) 3:29
6. "S.L.Y." (Crane) 4:43
7. "Winter" (Crane) 6:53
8. "Decline and Fall" (Crane, Graham, Palmer) 5:45
9. "Play the Game" (Du Cann) 4:45 – "Tomorrow Night" B-side 1971, bonus track on 1990 CD release

On the 2004 CD reissue of the album, tracks 3 and 4 on the A-side were transposed with tracks 3 and 4 on the B-side.

==== 2004 Castle Music CD reissue ====
1. "Friday the 13th" (Crane) 3:31
2. "And So to Bed" (Crane) 4:09
3. "Winter" (Crane) 6:53
4. "Decline and Fall" (Crane, Graham, Palmer) 5:45
5. "Banstead" (Crane, Graham, Palmer) 3:29
6. "S.L.Y." (Crane) 4:43
7. "Broken Wings" (John Mayall) 5:47
8. "Before Tomorrow" (Crane) 5:52
9. "Friday the 13th" (Crane) 3:28 – US version: original vocals and piano overdubbed with Du Cann's vocals and guitar
10. "Before Tomorrow" (Crane) 5:47 – US version: original piano, flute and congas overdubbed with Du Cann's guitar
11. "S.L.Y." (Crane) 4:53 – US version: original piano overdubbed with Du Cann's guitar
12. "Friday the 13th" (Crane) 4:28 – BBC Radio Session 1970
13. "Seven Lonely Streets" (Du Cann) 6:15 – BBC Radio Session 1970

==== 2006 Akarma Records unlicensed CD reissue bonus tracks ====
9. "Play the Game" (Du Cann) 4:45
10. "VUG" (Crane) 4:32 – demo with Carl Palmer 1970
11. "Devil's Answer" (Du Cann) 3:59 – demo with Carl Palmer 1970
12. "Friday the 13th" (Crane) 4:28 – BBC Radio Session 1970
13. "Seven Lonely Streets" (Du Cann) 6:15 – BBC Radio Session 1970

== Personnel ==
Atomic Rooster

- Vincent Crane – Hammond organ, Rhodes piano, backing vocals (tracks 1, 2, 7)
- Nick Graham – bass guitar, lead vocals, flute (tracks 4, 7), guitar (track 6)
- Carl Palmer – drums, percussion, congas (tracks 4, 9), glockenspiel (track 7)

On tracks overdubbed for US release

- John Du Cann – guitar, vocals

== Charts ==
Chart (1970)	Peak position
UK Albums (Official Charts)	49
