= Atomic Rooster =

British rock band

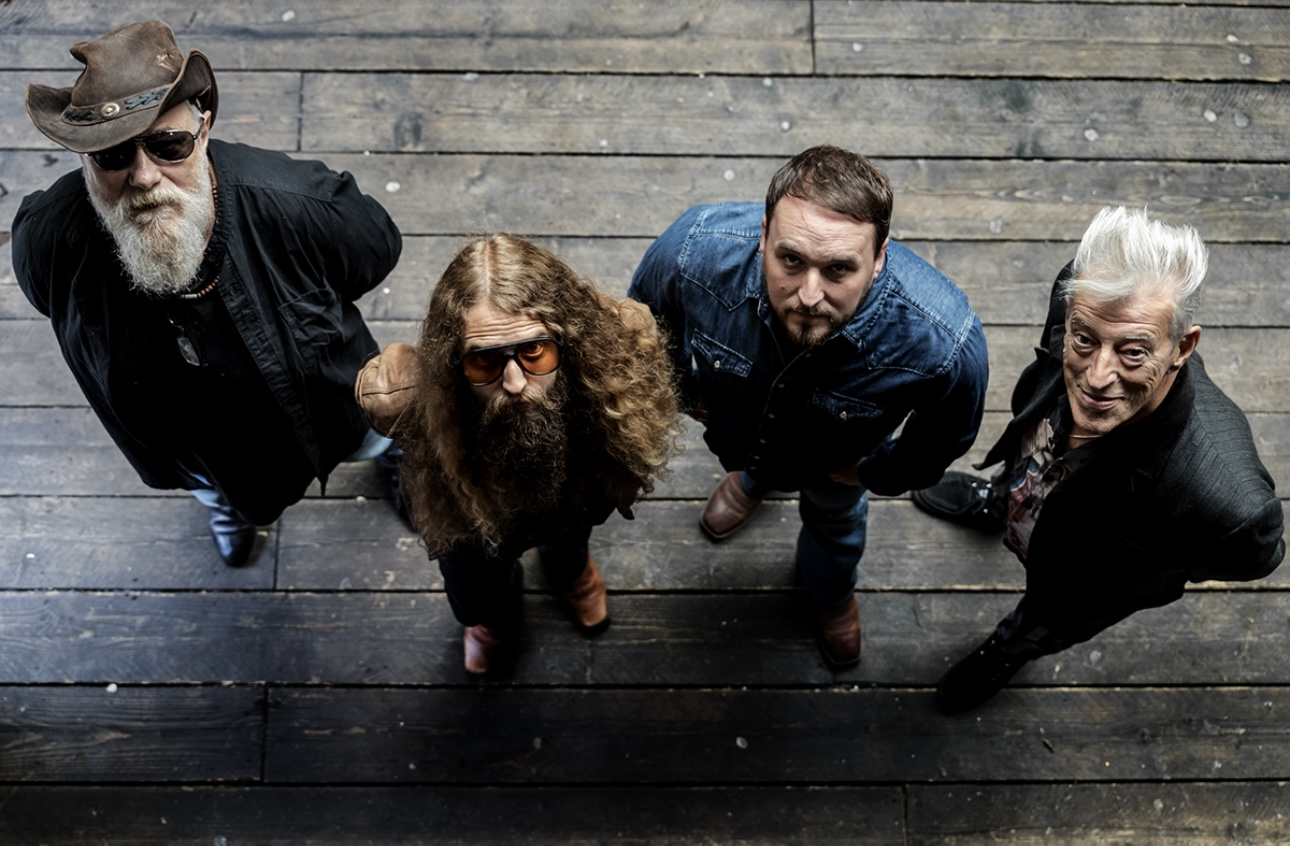
- Atomic Rooster in 2025 (from left to right) Shug Millidge, Adrain Gautrey, Paul Everett and Steve Bolton

Background information
- Origin: United Kingdom
- Genres: Progressive rock; hard rock; blue-eyed soul; blues rock
- Years active: 1969–1975; 1980–1983; 2016–present
- Labels: B&C; Dawn; Decca; EMI; Polydor; Towerbell; Pegasus; Cherry Red
- Spinoff of: The Crazy World of Arthur Brown
- Members: Steve Bolton; Adrian Gautrey; Shug Millidge; Paul Everett
- Past members: Vincent Crane; Carl Palmer; Nick Graham; John Du Cann; Paul Hammond; Pete French; Ric Parnell; Chris Farlowe; John Goodsall; Preston Heyman; Ginger Baker; John Mizarolli; Eamonn Carr; Bernie Tormé; Christian Madden; Bo Walsh
- Website: theatomicrooster.com

Atomic Rooster are a British rock band originally formed by members of The Crazy World of Arthur Brown, organist Vincent Crane and drummer Carl Palmer. Their history is defined by two periods: the early-mid-1970s and the early 1980s. The band went through radical style changes, but they are best known for the hard, progressive rock sound of their hit singles, "Tomorrow Night" (UK No. 11) and "Devil's Answer" (UK No. 4), both in 1971.

In 2016 Atomic Rooster reformed with permission from Crane's widow, with the new line-up featuring two members from the various 1970s incarnations of the band.

== History ==
=== Original period (1969–1975) ===
In the summer of 1969, the Crazy World of Arthur Brown split in the middle of a second US tour. Keyboardist Vincent Crane and drummer Carl Palmer left, returning to England to discuss a collaboration with Brian Jones, who had just been let go from the Rolling Stones. After Jones's death on 3 July 1969, they adopted the name Atomic Rooster (with influence from the US band Rhinoceros) and soon recruited Nick Graham on bass and vocals. They followed with what had been the Crazy World of Arthur Brown arrangement of vocals, organ, bass and drums.

They undertook live dates around London; at their first headlining gig at the London Lyceum on 29 August 1969, the opening act was Deep Purple. They eventually struck a deal with B & C Records and began recording their debut album in December 1969. Their first LP, Atomic Roooster, was released in February 1970, along with a single, "Friday the 13th".

By March, Crane recruited John Cann from acid/progressive rock band Andromeda. Steve Howe, who would later join Yes, was a runner-up for the band's new guitarist. However, just as Cann joined, bassist-vocalist Graham left. Cann (who played guitar and sang for Andromeda) took over vocal duties, while the bass lines were overdubbed on Crane's Hammond organ with a combination of left hand and pedals, and the vocals were replaced with Cann's vocals and some guitar on four tracks.

Atomic Rooster resumed gigging until the end of June 1970, when Carl departed to join Emerson, Lake & Palmer. Ric Parnell filled the drum spot until August, when Paul Hammond was recruited from Farm. They then recorded their second album, Death Walks Behind You, released in September 1970. Originally it was not commercially successful, as with the first album, but by February 1971, the single "Tomorrow Night" reached No. 11 in the UK Singles Chart, with the album reaching No. 12 in the UK Albums Chart. Atomic Rooster made an appearance on Top of the Pops, and toured to support the album.

In June 1971, just before they began configuring their line-up once again, the single "Devil's Answer" hit No. 4 in the UK. Atomic Rooster began recording In Hearing of Atomic Rooster (UK No. 18). Crane felt the band needed a singer who could "project" to an audience and asked Leaf Hound vocalist Pete French to audition for the band. Not long after French came into the studio, Cann began to feel increasingly marginalised, having been relieved of vocal duties and especially after hearing how much Crane had mixed out most of his guitar work on the album. He promptly left the band. Paul Hammond followed him to form Bullet, later renamed Hard Stuff. French recorded all the vocals on the album (save for "Black Snake", sung by Crane), and the album was released in August 1971.

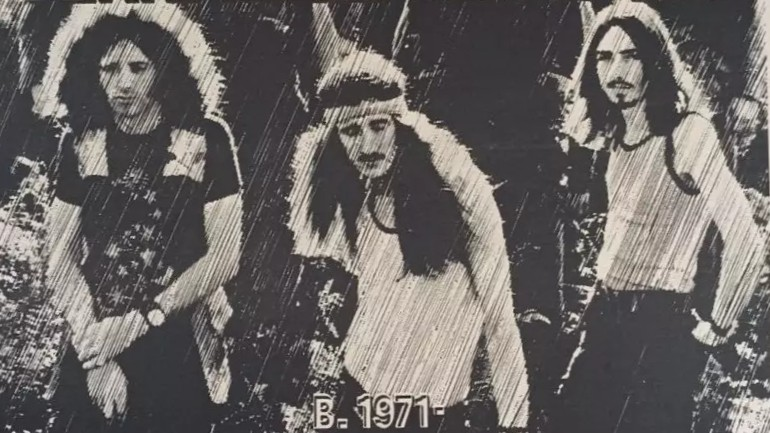
1971 left to right: John Cann, Vincent Crane, Paul Hammond

The Atomic Rooster line-up featuring Pete French on vocals, Steve Bolton on guitar, a returning Ric Parnell on drums and Crane on keyboards toured Italy, then across America and Canada. This line-up played at a benefit gig in September 1971 at The Oval cricket ground, appearing in front of some 65,000 people, supporting the Faces and the Who. They continued touring into at least December of 1971, but French then moved on to sign with Atlantic Records and joined the American rock band Cactus and appeared on their 1972 album, 'Ot 'n' Sweaty.

In February 1972 Crane recruited vocalist Chris Farlowe, at that time with Colosseum, to take the place of French. They went on tour and recorded their first album together in the spring of 1972. They then released the album Made in England along with the single "Stand by Me", on Dawn Records. They were more into soul at this point, and the progressive and heavy rock leanings from the other releases had receded. The single did not chart and the album barely caught any attention, even though touring followed.

Guitarist Steve Bolton left at the end of 1972 and was replaced by John Goodsall, appearing under the name Johnny Mandala. They released the album Nice 'n' Greasy in 1973, along with the single "Save Me", a re-working of "Friday the 13th". This time, it was in a complete funk style. After nearly two years without any hits, Dawn Records dropped the group and Atomic Rooster began to unravel. After a tour, Farlowe, Mandala and Parnell left. The single "Tell Your Story, Sing Your Song" was released in March 1974 by "Vincent Crane's Atomic Rooster" on Decca. All subsequent gigs were played by Crane along with members of the blues band Sam Apple Pie. A final concert was played in February 1975, a benefit gig for the RSPCA and Crane afterwards disbanded Atomic Rooster.

=== During hiatus (1975–1979) ===
Vincent Crane went on to put together the music for a number of plays and musicals in England between 1976 and 1977, including two of Peter Green's radio broadcasts. Crane teamed up with Arthur Brown again to play on his album Chisholm In My Bosom, and in 1979 they released the album Faster Than the Speed of Light. Crane and Brown would also perform a rendition of "Green Door", dressed in top hats and tails.

Cann, Hammond and John Gustafson released two albums as Hard Stuff between 1972 and 1973. Hard Stuff ended when Cann and Hammond suffered injuries in a car accident. Afterward, Cann filled in the guitar spot in Thin Lizzy for a tour in Germany during 1974 before going off the road to write music for ads and jingles in England. In 1977 he recorded a solo album (The World's Not Big Enough) with members of Status Quo and Gillan, before learning his record company was not going to release it. In 1979, having changed his name to John Du Cann, he had a minor hit with his rendition of "Don't Be a Dummy", used in a Lee Cooper jeans ad. Also in 1977, Paul Hammond played drums with T.H.E., a three piece featuring Pete Newnham (Cockney Rebel/Window) on guitar and vocals, and Mike Marchant (Third Ear Band) on bass and vocals. A single called "Rudi" was released that year on B&C Records under the name Pete Newnham, which has become a collector's item. That song and two unreleased tracks, "Johnny the Snark" and "Play with Fire", now appear on Bored Teenagers No. 5 from Detour Records.

=== Reformation period (1980–1983) ===
During 1980, Crane contacted Du Cann and after some discussion, got an Atomic Rooster reformation under way. They recruited session drummer Preston Heyman and recorded an album, along with one 7/12" single, on EMI Records. The album, Atomic Rooster (1980), was followed by a tour, but Heyman left in October and Paul Hammond returned to play drums after Ginger Baker filled in for two weeks. They continued touring and released two singles in 1981 and 1982. However, Du Cann was unable to make their last-minute booking at the Reading Festival, so Crane and Hammond used Mick Hawksworth (ex-Andromeda) as a stand-in. John McCoy later stepped in on bass at the insistence of Polydor Records, for whom they would release two further singles, "Play It Again" and "End of the Day", which saw some attention on the Heavy metal music chart, but did little elsewhere, and Polydor shortly afterwards dropped the band.

With Du Cann gone, Crane set about a new form of Atomic Rooster. Paul Hammond stayed on and played drums for the following album Headline News (1983), recorded in late 1982. Several guitarists played on the album, including David Gilmour of Pink Floyd, Bernie Torme of Gillan and John Mizarolli. Crane added vocals to the album along with his wife on backing vocals. A tour of Germany and Italy included Bernie Torme on guitar. Mizarolli played guitar for several UK dates.

Headline News was released in June 1983 and featured a completely different sound from anything they had ever done, including electronics and synthesizers. The album was completely written by Vincent Crane, leading some to perceive it as a Crane solo album.

Crane disbanded Atomic Rooster once again at the end of 1983. In 1984 he went on to the project Katmandu with Peter Green, Ray Dorset and Jeff Whittaker and they recorded the album A Case for the Blues.

In 1985, Crane joined Dexy's Midnight Runners, playing piano for their album Don't Stand Me Down and two singles, one becoming the theme song for the television series Brush Strokes.

Dexy's Midnight Runners disbanded in 1987 and Crane intended to reform Atomic Rooster with Du Cann once again. A German tour was planned for 1989, but Crane died from an overdose of painkillers on 14 February. Du Cann struck a deal with Angel Air Records and oversaw the release and re-release of much of his and Atomic Rooster's material, including live recordings, compilations, compilations of unreleased material and album reissues with extra material. Paul Hammond died in 1992 and Du Cann in 2011.

=== Revival and new line-up (2016–present) ===
In 2016, a new line-up of Atomic Rooster played together with permission to use the name offered initially to Steve Bolton and Pete French from Crane's widow. The first gig was a low-key warm-up in Clitheroe, Lancashire on 14 July 2016. The line-up was Pete French and Steve Bolton, keyboardist Christian Madden, bass guitarist Shug Millidge and drummer Bo Walsh.

In 2017, Madden was replaced by Adrian Gautrey and in September 2019 French's departure due to musical differences was announced, but he then decided to continue with the band.

In 2020, Bo Walsh left Atomic Rooster, and he was replaced by Paul Everett, a drummer originally from Liverpool. Pete French, after successfully reforming Atomic Rooster with Steve Bolton in 2016 and performing with them for seven years, once again stopped performing with the band in November of 2023 as he could no longer keep up with the touring schedule and left the band in the middle of a 2023 EU tour.

Gautrey replaced French on vocals. Later that year, the band released the single "No More" b/w "Rebel Devil", which was the first new music under the Atomic Rooster name since 1983. This was sold only at the band's concerts.

On 28 July 2025, Atomic Rooster announced the release of Circle the Sun, the band's first full-length studio album in 42 years, on 10 October. available on Cherry Red Records. This included the tracks "No More" and "Rebel Devil" from the 2024 single.

== Members ==
Current members

- Steve Bolton – guitar (1971–1972, 2016–present), vocals (2024-present)
- Adrian Gautrey – keyboards, vocals (2017–present)
- Shug Millidge – bass guitar (2016–present)
- Paul Everett – drums (2020–present)

== Discography (with UK release dates) ==
=== Albums ===
Date of release	Title	US	AUS	UK	CAN
1970	Atomic Roooster	—	—	49	—
1970	Death Walks Behind You	90	13	12	44
1971	In Hearing of Atomic Rooster	167	—	18	45
1972	Made in England	149	42	—	60
1973	Nice 'n' Greasy	—	—	—	—
1980	Atomic Rooster	—	—	—	—
1983	Headline News	—	—	—	—
2025	Circle the Sun	—	—	—	—

=== Live albums ===
- BBC Radio 1 Live in Concert 1972 (1993)
- Devil's Answer 1970–81 BBC Radio sessions (1998)
- Live and Raw 70/71 (2000)
- Live in Germany 1983 (2000)
- Live at the Marquee 1980 (2002)

=== Compilation albums ===
- Assortment (1973)
- Home to Roost (1977)
- The Devil Hits Back (1989)
- Space Cowboy (1991)
- The Best of Atomic Rooster Volumes 1 & 2 (1992)
- In Satan's Name: The Definitive Collection (1997)
- The First 10 Explosive Years (1999)
- Rarities (2000)
- The First 10 Explosive Years Volume 2 (2001)
- Heavy Soul (2001)
- Close Your Eyes: A Collection 1965-1986 (2008; released under the name Vincent Crane)
- Homework (2008)
- Anthology 1969-81 (2009)

=== Box sets ===
- Resurrection (2001) – Akarma unlicensed CD reissues of first three albums, with 24-page illustrated booklet
- Devil's Answer: The Singles Collection (2006) – reissue of first six UK singles on 7" or individual CDs

=== Singles ===
Year	Single	Peak position	
Year	Single	UK	NLD
1970	Friday the 13th	—	—
1970	Tomorrow Night	11	— (Note: "Tomorrow Night" did not chart in the Dutch Top 30 singles chart but spent 2 weeks in the Single Tip chart peaking at number 8.)
1971	Devil's Answer	4	— (Note: "Devil’s Answer" did not chart in the Dutch Top 30 singles chart but spent 2 weeks in the Single Tip chart peaking at number 6.)
1972	Stand by Me	—	—
1972	Save Me (Note: re-recorded, retitled version of "Friday the 13th")	—	— (Note: "Save Me" did not chart in the Dutch Top 30 singles chart but spent 1 week in the Single Tip chart peaking at number 15.)
1973	Can't Find a Reason (Note: as "Crane/Farlow" [sic.])	—	—
1974	Tell Your Story (Sing Your Song) (Note: as "Vincent Crane's Atomic Rooster")	—	—
1980	Do You Know Who's Looking for You?	—	—
1981	Play It Again	—	—
1982	End of the Day	—	—
1983	Land of Freedom	—	—

=== DVDs ===
- Masters from the Vaults (2003)

== See also ==
- Progressive rock
- Roger Dean – designed album cover In Hearing of Atomic Rooster
- Richard Wahnfried – Crane and Brown recorded one album with this project initiated by Klaus Schulze, Time Actor in 1979
