= Ric Parnell =

British drummer (1951–2022)

- Parnell in 1972

Background information
- Born: 14 August 1951; London, England
- Died: 1 May 2022 (aged 70) Missoula, Montana, US
- Genres: Progressive rock, heavy metal
- Occupation: Musician
- Instruments: Drums, percussion
- Years active: 1968–2022

Ric Parnell (14 August 1951 – 1 May 2022) was an English rock drummer and actor. Notable for his work in the band Atomic Rooster, he is probably best known for his role as the ill-fated drummer Mick Shrimpton in the film This Is Spinal Tap.

== Career ==
Born in London in 1951, Parnell had a long family history of musical careers. His grandfather Russ Carr was a music hall artist and his father Jack Parnell was a jazz drummer and musical director for Associated Television. He had two brothers, Will and Marc Parnell, who are also drummers. His two sisters decided not to enter the music business.

In 1970, he was a member of the short-lived hard rock band Horse, who recorded one album before breaking up. Shortly after, he briefly joined the progressive rock band Atomic Rooster, leaving after just two months with the band. By the end of 1971 he had been invited to rejoin Atomic Rooster, this time staying long enough to play on the band's last two albums.

After Atomic Rooster folded, Parnell (using his nickname "Spyder") joined with the Italian group Tritons, who had a hit in Italy with their re-arranged version of the Rolling Stones song "Satisfaction" in 1973. They quickly issued an album also titled Satisfaction that same year. Several members of Tritons were more interested in performing music of a more serious nature; these members (including Parnell) left Tritons and helped co-found the Italian prog-rock group Ibis. Parnell was the drummer and co-lyricist on their 1974 album, Sun Supreme. The group continued for one further album after Parnell left.

In 1975, Parnell was a member of the more pop/rock oriented group Stars, which issued one self-titled album before breaking up. That was followed by a two-album stint as drummer for Italian/British jazz fusion group Nova in 1977 and 1978.

After leaving Nova, Parnell continued to play for various other bands and artists throughout the 1970s and 1980s including Michael Des Barres and Lisa Dal Bello, as well as providing the drums for the Toni Basil hit "Mickey" among other contributions. At one time, Steve Perry offered him a spot in Journey, but Parnell declined as he was preoccupied with his studio band at the time Zoo Drive, a decision he later regretted.

Parnell's big break came in 1984 when he played the role of Mick Shrimpton in the mockumentary This Is Spinal Tap. His character was one of a long line of unfortunate drummers who all perish from freak accidents, his own fate being spontaneous combustion. Parnell later recounted his audition for this role:

"The first question they asked was, 'What do you think about a movie that's going to tear your career apart?' I said, 'You should have made this movie about 10 years ago.' They then asked me what other bands I'd been in, and I said, 'Well, I was in a band called Atomic Rooster.' They looked at each other and said, 'Yep, that's it, you're our man.'"

Spinal Tap became a working band, recording a soundtrack album and promoting the film with live shows and a 1984 appearance on Saturday Night Live. The character of Mick Shrimpton having died in This Is Spinal Tap, Parnell assumed the role of his "twin brother" drummer Ric Shrimpton for the group's appearances subsequent to the film. This continued through the band's 1992 reunion album Break Like the Wind and the associated concert tour. Parnell was not a part of more recent Spinal Tap activity.

While living in Missoula, Montana, Parnell co-hosted an 8-midnight radio program, Spontaneous Combustion, on KDTR Trail 103.3 FM. Parnell was an avid golfer and frequently played golf when not employed playing the drums.

Parnell died on 1 May 2022 in Missoula, Montana at the age of 70 from a blood clot in his lungs.

== Discography ==
- Horse - Horse (1970)
- Atomic Rooster – Made in England (1972)
- Atomic Rooster - Nice 'n' Greasy (1973)
- Ibis - Sun Supreme (1974)
- Stars - Stars (1976)
- Nova – Wings of Love (1977)
- Nova - Sun City (1978)
- Michael Des Barres – I'm Only Human (1980)
- Toni Basil – Word of Mouth (1982)
- Spinal Tap – This Is Spinal Tap (1984)
- Jon Anderson - 3 Ships (1985)
- Spinal Tap - Break Like the Wind (1992)
- The Deviants - Barbarian Princes (Live in Japan 1999) (1999)
- Deniz Tek - Detroit (2013)
- Donovan's Brain – Shambaholic And Other Love Songs (2014)
- Donovan's Brain – Heirloom Varieties (2015)
- Cloud Over Jupiter – Jupiter Rising (2015)
- The Dukes of 1987 – Retroderelict (2016)
- Deniz Tek – Mean Old Twister (2016)
- Jamie Bruhn - Cigarettes and Lies (2017)
- Telestrion – Blazing In The Sky (2018)
- Deniz Tek – Lost For Words (2018)
- PHILIDOR -– Woodpushers (2019)

== Filmography ==
- This Is Spinal Tap (1984) – as Mick Shrimpton
- Masters from the Vaults (2003)
- The Devil's Due at Midnight (2004)
- Saving For The Day (2018) - as Ricardo
