= Carl Palmer =

English drummer (born 1950)

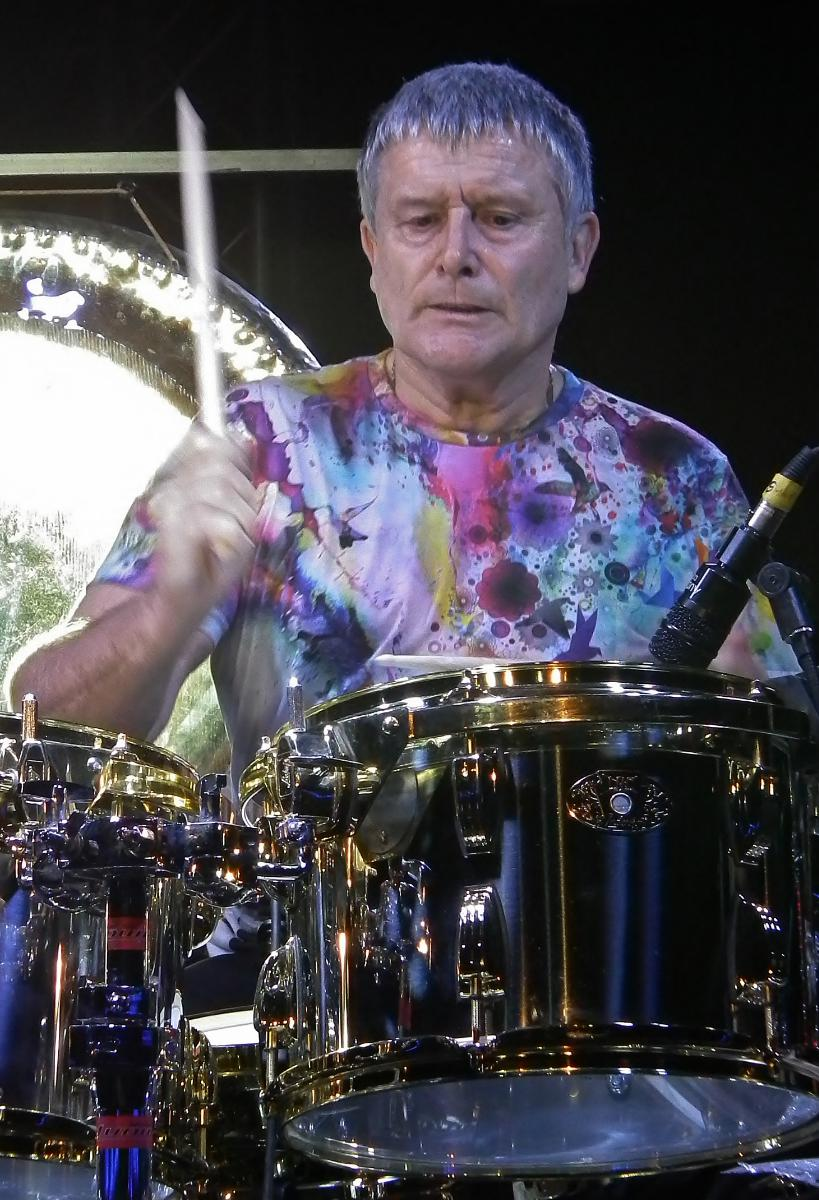
- Palmer performing in 2014

Background information
- Born: Carl Frederick Kendall Palmer; 20 March 1950 (age 76); Handsworth, Birmingham, England
- Genre: Progressive rock
- Occupation: Drummer
- Years active: 1964–present
- Labels: Island; Manticore; Atlantic; Eagle Rock; Geffen
- Member of: Carl Palmer's ELP Legacy
- Formerly of: The Crazy World of Arthur Brown; Atomic Rooster; Emerson, Lake & Palmer; Asia; 3; Qango; Carl Palmer Band
- Website: carlpalmer.com

Carl Frederick Kendall Palmer (born 20 March 1950) is an English drummer. He was a founding member of the supergroups Emerson, Lake & Palmer and Asia, a touring drummer for The Crazy World of Arthur Brown and a founding member of Atomic Rooster. He has toured with his own bands since 2001, including Palmer, the Carl Palmer Band, and currently, Carl Palmer's ELP Legacy.

Palmer was inducted into the Modern Drummer Hall of Fame in 1989, and was awarded the Prog God Award at the 2017 Progressive Music Awards.

== Career ==
=== Early groups, Arthur Brown, and Atomic Rooster ===
Palmer began taking drum lessons as a young boy. He took lessons with Britain's best-known classical percussionist of the twentieth century, James Blades. His first band, formed with others from the Midlands area, was originally known as the King Bees, but changed its name to the Craig. In 1966, the band made its first record, "I Must Be Mad", with flip side "Suspense", produced by Larry Page. At this time, Palmer also did his first session work, playing on the song "Love Light" by the Chants, a group from Liverpool. Later in 1966, he was then invited to join Chris Farlowe and the Thunderbirds.

Drachen Theaker was the original drummer for The Crazy World of Arthur Brown, founded by Arthur Brown. Theaker abruptly left the band during a U.S. tour in 1969. Palmer was quickly recruited as a replacement and became a permanent band member.

Vincent Crane was the keyboard player with the Crazy World of Arthur Brown, and both he and Palmer left that group in the summer of 1969 to strike out musically on their own as Atomic Rooster, a trio formed with vocalist/bassist Nick Graham. Palmer reports that Brown himself had "gone missing on a commune on Long Island" and that this was a deciding factor in forming the new band. There were several personnel changes in the band, and their first album was released in early 1970. Meanwhile, Palmer received a call from Keith Emerson to audition for a new group and left Atomic Rooster in the summer of 1970.

=== Emerson, Lake & Palmer ===
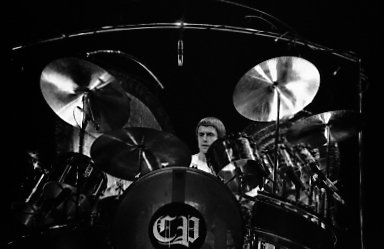
Palmer on stage with ELP in 1978

Palmer met up with two other young English musicians, Greg Lake and Keith Emerson. Emerson had most recently been a member of The Nice, and Lake was in King Crimson, and both wanted to further expand their musical creativity. After discussions with Jimi Hendrix and Mitch Mitchell about forming a group fell apart, they auditioned several drummers, and felt an "immediate chemistry" with Palmer, and by the summer of 1970 they had formed a band. In naming the new group, the trio chose their last names alphabetically – Emerson, Lake & Palmer, also shortened to ELP. The band was nominated at the 1972 Grammy Awards for Best New Artist. They developed a sound that merged art rock, jazz, electronica, pop rock and classical music and found fans within their peers and the public alike. The band has been the most successful of Palmer's career, and he remained with ELP until they first disbanded in 1979.

Palmer rejoined ELP when they reformed in 1992 for Black Moon, In the Hot Seat, a box set, as well as several DVDs and the subsequent tours. In 1998, the trio split. A one-off ELP performance at the 2010 High Voltage Festival celebrated the 40th anniversary of forming the band. Following the deaths of Emerson and Lake in 2016, Palmer is the only surviving member of ELP.

=== Asia ===
Following the first break-up of ELP in 1980, Palmer formed PM with Texas blues rock guitarist John Nitzinger for one album before joining John Wetton and Steve Howe in early 1981, who had been brought together to form a new super-group. They were later joined by Geoff Downes to form Asia. The group was nominated at the 25th Annual Grammy Awards for Best New Artist, making them the second and last progressive rock band to achieve this feat. Palmer became only the second artist to be nominated twice for this award, after David Crosby. Palmer left Asia in 1991 to join the ELP reunion. After several personnel changes the four founding members of Asia including Palmer reunited in 2006.

Palmer reunited with the original line-up of Asia in 2006. They celebrated their 25th anniversary, and have since released four new studio albums, Phoenix, in 2008, Omega in 2010, XXX (30) in 2012, and Gravitas in 2014. A live album and DVD from the 2006 reunion tour, entitled Fantasia was released by Eagle Rock Records. As of 2024, he has not participated in Asia touring.

=== Production credits ===
The jazz trio Back Door toured with ELP circa 1974, and Palmer began to collaborate with them, producing their fourth album, Activate (1976). Two of the members of the group, saxophonist Ron Aspery and bassist Colin Hodgkinson, co-wrote the song "Bullfrog" with Palmer, also playing (uncredited) on the song, which appears on Works Volume 2.

=== Other projects ===
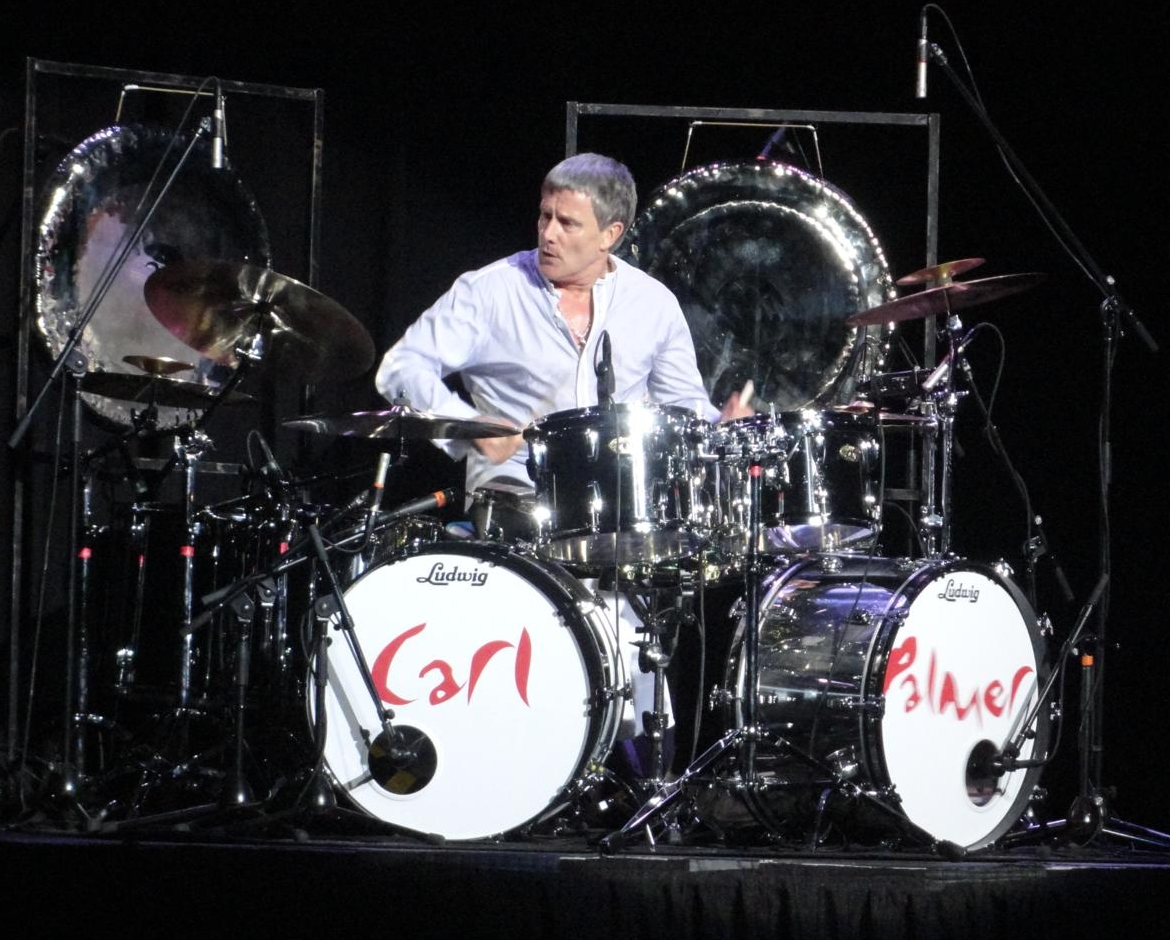
Palmer performing in 2012

Palmer played drums on "Mount Teidi" on Five Miles Out (1982) by Mike Oldfield. Another Oldfield track he performed on, "Ready Mix", remained unreleased until 2001.

Palmer has performed various drum clinics across Europe and the United States. Highlights of Palmer's live drum solo over the years have included the use of both gongs and tambourines, and also his ability to extract himself from his T-shirt while playing complex double bass drum patterns; the latter leaving him stripped to the waist to play the final part of his show. The removal of his shirt was a major 'attraction' in Palmer's drum solos during the 1970s, 1980s and 1990s. On recent tours, however, his shirt has remained on throughout his performances.

Palmer is a patron of the British Classic Rock Society, which promotes progressive rock concerts.

In 2001, Palmer formed his own band, initially known as Palmer and then the Carl Palmer Band, featuring guitarist Shaun Baxter and bassist Dave Marks. They were replaced by Paul Bielatowicz and Stuart Clayton, and later by Simon Fitzpatrick, performing instrumental versions of ELP songs as Carl Palmer's ELP Legacy. In 2017, following Emerson and Lake's deaths, the trio embarked on the Emerson, Lake & Palmer Lives On! World Tour.

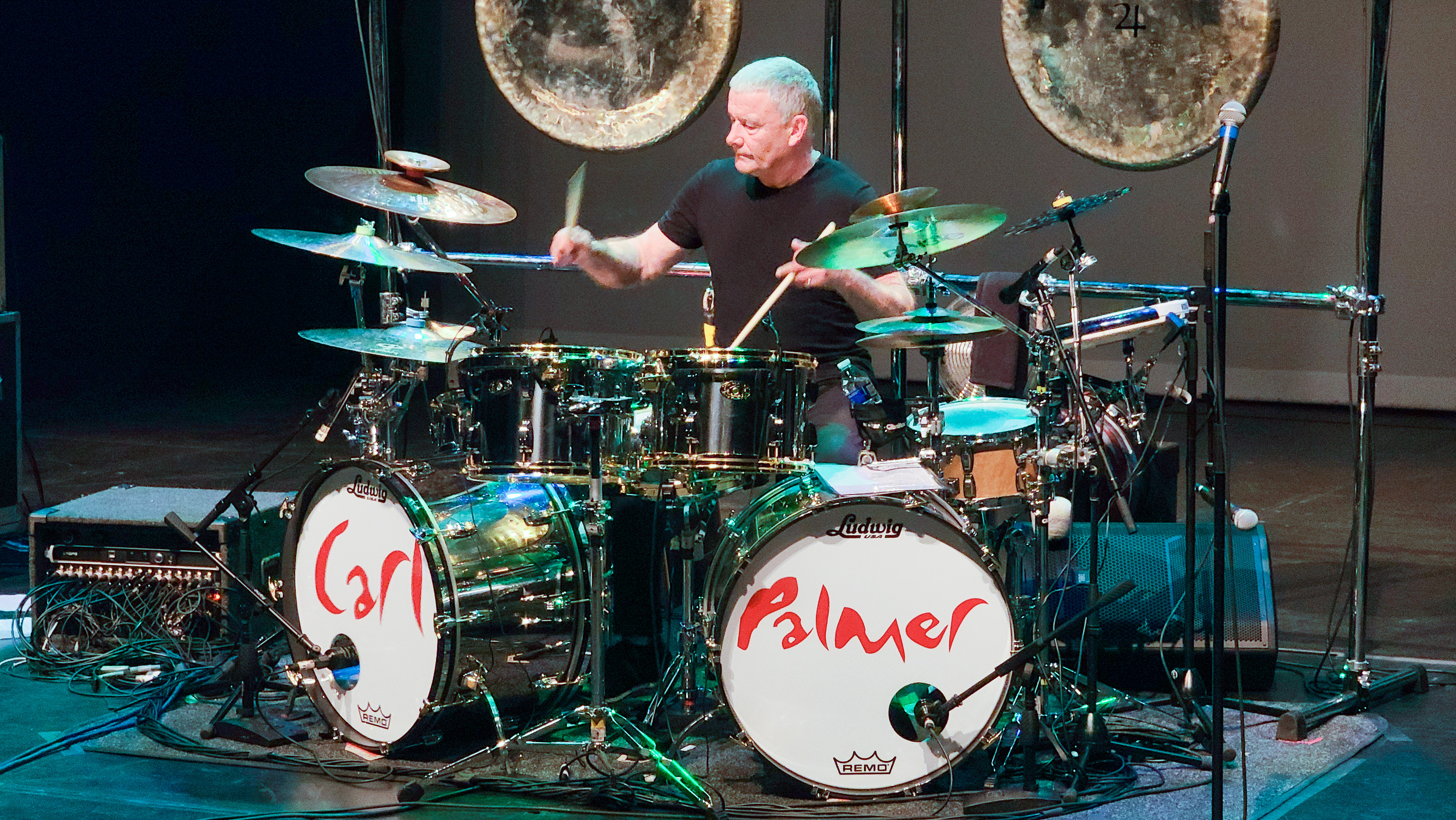
Carl Palmer performs at William Paterson University in Wayne, NJ, as part of Carl Palmer's ELP Legacy Tour celebrating ELP's 50th Anniversary (November 2021)

In November 2019, Palmer held the Carl Palmer's Prog Rock Camp at the 2300 Arena in Philadelphia.

In 2019, Palmer performed with Asia and ELP Legacy during The Royal Affair Tour, headlined by Yes.

In 2021, Palmer returned to performing following the COVID pandemic to promote the Carl Palmer's ELP Legacy Tour celebrating ELP's 50th anniversary. In addition to Palmer, the band features Paul Bielatowicz on guitar and vocals; and Simon Fitzpatrick on bass and Chapman stick.

In July 2026, Palmer played alongside the BBC Concert Orchestra at the Royal Albert Hall, as part of the BBC Proms concert Prog Rock: A Fanfare for the Common Man. He played the opening and ELP's "Fanfare for the Common Man".

== Influences ==
Having played with a variety of bands, including various anonymous schoolboy bands as a youth, Palmer's style was developed from a wide range of musical influences. Among Palmer's early drumming influences were Joe Morello, Philly Joe Jones, Art Blakey, Gene Krupa and Buddy Rich. Inspiration from their techniques can be heard in his own drumming style, which was initially influenced more from jazz than any other genre. Known for his technical prowess, another of Palmer's trademarks included solos in many of his performances. His later work in Asia saw a more basic approach, although he began to play double bass drums more frequently during that period, and was the eleventh drummer to be inducted into the Modern Drummer Hall of Fame.

== Personal life ==
Carl married his first wife, Maureen Fraser, in 1985. She gave birth to his only child, Carissa, now a lawyer. His spouse since 2004 has been Katie, with whom Palmer resides in both Cyprus and the UK. He became vegan in 2010.

== Equipment ==
=== Drums ===
- Palmer owns a Ludwig Vistalite drum kit with blue Vistalite shells.
- Ludwig signature "Venus" snare drum.

In 2011, Ludwig released his "Signature Venus snare drum", made of a green-lacquered brass shell with a 3.7" depth and a 14" diameter.

- Stainless steel drum kit

In 1973, Palmer commissioned British Steel to design a custom stainless steel drum kit using one-half-inch thick shells; the only off-the-shelf equipment were the hoops manufactured by Gretsch. He also had a jeweller engrave the shells with various animals. The kit, along with other percussion instruments and a rotating platform, had a total weight of approximately 2.5 tons and many of the stages on tour had to be reinforced, with some venues cancelling shows because of it. Also, the kit was electronically designed to be "synthesized" to sound like electronic drums. The kit was purchased around 1980 by Ringo Starr for his son Zak, who rarely used it. Ringo put it up for auction in 2015, and it was purchased by David Frangioni, publisher and CEO of Modern Drummer magazine.

- Paiste Bronze drum kit; Palmer also used a bronze drum kit manufactured by Paiste, which is built from 2002 model cymbal bronze.
- Korg WaveDrum; Palmer uses a Korg Wavedrum in his drum solo.

=== Cymbals ===
Palmer has endorsed Paiste since 1971 and currently uses this cymbal setup:

- 5" 2002 Cup Chime
- 13" Signature Heavy Hi-Hat
- 6" 2002 Cup Chime
- 18" Signature Power Crash
- 20" Signature Heavy Bell Ride
- 20" Signature Power Crash
- 13" 2002 Sound Edge Hi-Hat
- 6" 2002 Bell Chime
- 22" 2002 China

=== Heads ===
Palmer uses Remo drumheads.

=== Sticks ===
Pro-Mark produced his first signature drumsticks. They were made of American hickory, with a quite short length (15 7/8") and a diameter between a 5A and a 5B (0.579"). After leaving Pro-Mark, he joined Vater Percussion drumsticks in 2022, who made him a brand new signature stick. The new signature sticks, while still made of American hickory and still having a diameter between a 5A and a 5B (0.580"), brings the length back up to a standard length (16").

=== Other ===
Palmer also uses timpani, tubular bells and tam-tam as usually used in the symphony orchestra. Other percussion he has used include temple blocks, triangle, church bell, vibraslap, electronic percussion synthesizers and ratchet.

== Discography ==
=== Other ===
Year	Band	Album	Notes
1966	The Craig	I Must Be Mad	Single
1966	The Chants	Love Light	Single
1967	Chris Farlowe and the Thunderbirds	Moanin'	Single
1970	Atomic Rooster	Atomic Roooster	Studio
1998	Atomic Rooster	Devil's Answer	1970–81 BBC Radio sessions
2000	Atomic Rooster	Live and Raw 70/71	Live
1980	PM	1:PM	Studio
1982	Mike Oldfield	Five Miles Out	Studio
1988	3	To the Power of Three	Studio
2015	3	Live Boston '88	Live
2000	Qango	Live in the Hood	Live
2001	Carl Palmer	Carl Palmer Anthology – Do Ya Wanna Play, Carl?	Compilation
2003	Carl Palmer Band	Working Live, Volume 1	Live
2003	Carl Palmer Band	Working Live, Volume 2	Live
2006	Carl Palmer Band	In Concert: Carl Palmer plays the Music of ELP	DVD
2010	Carl Palmer Band	Working Live, Volume 3	Live
2011	Carl Palmer	Drum Solos	DVD
2016	Carl Palmer's ELP Legacy	Live In The USA	Live
2016	Carl Palmer's ELP Legacy	Pictures At An Exhibition – A Tribute To Keith Emerson	DVD
2018	Carl Palmer's ELP Legacy	Live	Live (CD/DVD)
