= B&C Records =

UK record label

B&C Records (which stood for Beat & Commercial) was a British record label run by Trojan Records' owner, Lee Gopthal. It existed primarily between May 1969 and September 1972.

In 1971, the progressive and folk artists that were still signed to the label were moved over to B&C's new Pegasus Records imprint (which later became Peg), though singles continued to be issued on the B&C label until 1972. Pegasus Records released 14 albums before closing down in 1972, after which most of the artists moved over to Mooncrest Records label. Mooncrest had started out as Charisma Records's publishing company, but had become a record label in its own right in 1973. It reissued some of the original Pegasus releases. The company continued after this point in its original format as a record manufacturing, distribution and marketing company, continuing to distribute records by Charisma and Mooncrest. Between 1971 and 1974, B&C and Charisma shared their CB-100 series for singles.

In 1974 B&C got into financial trouble and was finally sold, along with Trojan and Mooncrest, to Marcel Rodd, head of Allied/Saga Records. Trojan and Mooncrest continued to issue records marketed by B&C, though Charisma moved its operations over to Phonogram Inc. in May 1975. The B&C label was resurrected as a label between 1977 and 1981, releasing just a few new singles and reissuing several classic tracks as singles or EPs.

B&C was originally intended to reissue gospel/soul artists such as James Carr, but did branch out to other genres eventually. B&C released Atomic Rooster's first two albums, Atomic Roooster (1970) and Death Walks Behind You, Steeleye Span's Please to See the King (1971), Nazareth's Loud 'n' Proud (1974), Andy Roberts' Home Grown (1971) and Everyone (1971), and one self-titled LP by the Newcastle-based band Ginhouse.

The label was also prominent in the early "revival" period of 1950s rock and roll. The Wild Angels, one of the first of these groups had two albums released on B&C in 1970, Live at the Revolution and Red Hot N Rockin. They both had "gatefold" sleeves. The company also released an album called Battle of the Bands, which featured an early recording by Shakin' Stevens, and also Gene Vincent, and acts such as The Impalas and The Houseshakers. There was also an album by The Rock N Roll Allstars entitled Red China Rocks.
