= John Du Cann =

English guitarist (1946–2011)

- Born: John William Cann; 2 June 1946; Leicester, England
- Died: 21 September 2011 (aged 65) Norwich, Norfolk, England
- Genres: Hard rock, heavy metal, progressive rock, psychedelic rock
- Instruments: Guitar, vocals
- Years active: 1960s–2011

John William Cann (2 June 1946 – 21 September 2011), later known by his stage name John Du Cann, was an English guitarist primarily known through his work in the 1970s band Atomic Rooster.

== Life and career ==
His early bands included the Wiltshire based The Sonics (not to be confused with the 1960s US band The Sonics) and London-based The Attack, which released "Hi Ho Silver Lining" a few days prior to Jeff Beck. He went on to lead a psychedelic, progressive, hard rock band called Andromeda, before being asked to join Atomic Rooster, when bass player and vocalist Nick Graham left the band. Cann overdubbed guitar parts and replaced Graham's vocals on three tracks of their 1970 self-titled debut album, and a second pressing featuring the overdubbed tracks was soon issued, though without crediting him on the sleeve. Cann wrote or co-wrote four songs on the album Death Walks Behind You (1970) and two for In Hearing of Atomic Rooster (1971), along with Atomic Rooster's biggest hit single, "Devil's Answer", which reached No. 4 in the UK Singles Chart in July 1971, just before Cann left the band.

Upon departing Atomic Rooster he formed Daemon, later renamed Bullet, then Hard Stuff, after discovering that the previous name had already been used by an American band, releasing two albums on Purple Records, based more heavily on aggressive guitar work. In 1974, he was a temporary guitarist in Thin Lizzy for a tour of Germany. Sometime following this, his manager suggested a name change for him from John Cann to John Du Cann.

As a result of being signed to the same management company, 1977 saw the pairing of Du Cann with Francis Rossi of the British rock band Status Quo. Rossi was invited to produce Du Cann's proposed new album, The World's Not Big Enough, which remained unreleased until 1992. The session musicians for this album included Rossi on guitar, Andy Bown on keyboards, future Quo drummer Pete Kircher and bassist John McCoy. The album, mostly made up of breakneck-speed garage rock and manic proto-punk, was described in Record Collector magazine at the time as sounding like "Quo mixed with the Sex Pistols".

In September 1979, Du Cann had a hit on the UK Singles Chart with "Don't Be A Dummy", an unreleased version of which (featuring vocals by Gary Numan) had featured in a Lee Cooper Jeans television advertisement in 1978. The single reached number 33 in the UK Singles Chart.

In 1979, Du Cann and Crane re-formed Atomic Rooster with Preston Heyman on drums (with whom they recorded their 1980 self-titled album). Following this, after a brief spell with former Cream drummer Ginger Baker (who was released after only three weeks), Paul Hammond returned to his place on the drums, and the band released two more singles on Polydor with minimal success. In 1981, the band were booked at the last minute at the Reading Festival, but Du Cann was unable to make it, and Mick Hawksworth sat in with the band on bass guitar, while Crane took over on lead vocals. In late 1982, Du Cann had had enough of the non-success of the band, and left for the final time.

In the late 1990s, he was introduced to the Angel Air record label by John McCoy. He was later active cataloguing and remastering his personal tape archive and compiling reissues for the label, for which he received full credit and royalties.

John Du Cann's last ever studio recording was made in 2000, at Green Hills Studio in Norwich. It was owned by Chris Phillips, who also wrote the sleeve notes for three of the Atomic Rooster CDs released on Angel Air. Du Cann overdubbed guitar and vocals on an unused backing track that was recorded in 1980, titled "Broken Window". The track was originally added to the Rarities CD on the Angel Air label (SJPCD069), released in 2000, and later on The First 10 Explosive Years Volume 2 (SJPCD086) released in 2001.

Du Cann died at his home in Norwich on 21 September 2011 after a heart attack. His personal collection of 75 guitars, 30 amplifiers, records and CDs was auctioned in January 2012. An original copy of the Andromeda LP made £800, whilst his well used 1963 Fender Strat sold for £6500. His mother was the only beneficiary of his estate. He is buried at Greenacres Burial Ground at Colney, near Norwich. His gravestone is inscribed with the first line of "Devil's Answer".
