= Vincent Crane =

English keyboardist (1943–1989)

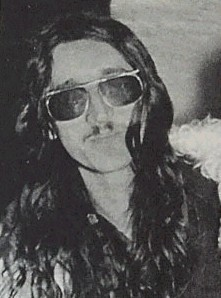
- Crane in 1970

Background information
- Born: Vincent Rodney Cheesman; 21 May 1943; Reading, Berkshire, England
- Died: 14 February 1989 (aged 45) Westminster, London, England
- Genres: Progressive rock; hard rock; psychedelic rock; blues rock; soul; funk
- Instruments: Hammond organ; piano; keyboards; vocals
- Years active: 1967–1989
- Formerly of: Atomic Rooster; The Crazy World of Arthur Brown; Dexys Midnight Runners

Vincent Rodney Cheesman (21 May 1943 – 14 February 1989), known professionally as Vincent Crane, was an English keyboardist, best known as the organist for the Crazy World of Arthur Brown (he was a co-writer of that group's 1968 hit single "Fire") and subsequently for Atomic Rooster.

== Biography ==
Born Vincent Rodney Cheesman in Reading, Berkshire, he taught himself boogie woogie piano as a teenager before attending Trinity College of Music between 1961 and 1964. Influenced by Graham Bond, he took up the Hammond organ. In late 1966 he formed the Vincent Crane Combo, which comprised bass player Binky McKenzie, sax player John Claydon and drummer Gordon Hadler. In 1967 he teamed up with Arthur Brown in the Crazy World of Arthur Brown. Their debut album The Crazy World of Arthur Brown (1968) contained the song "Fire", co-written by Crane, which was a chart-topping hit single in the United Kingdom, the United States and Canada, featuring Crane's organ and brass arrangements.

During their first tour of the United States in 1968, Crane had a nervous breakdown and returned to the United Kingdom where he spent some months in the mental hospital at Banstead. Crane rejoined the band but on a subsequent tour of the United States, the band disintegrated in June 1969 when Arthur Brown temporarily disappeared to a commune and Crane and drummer Carl Palmer left to form Atomic Rooster, playing their first concert at the Lyceum in London on 29 August, headlining over Deep Purple. Atomic Rooster enjoyed success in 1971 with two hit singles, "Tomorrow Night" (written by Crane) and "Devil's Answer". Crane was the one constant member of the band through their many different lineups, and wrote a slim majority of their material.

Atomic Rooster published their first eponymous album in 1970, and then drummer Carl Palmer left to form Emerson, Lake & Palmer that same year.

Crane lived with bipolar disorder from at least 1968 onwards, periodically necessitating treatment at both out- and inpatient mental health treatment facilities.

He collaborated with other musicians on a number of albums, including Rory Gallagher (Rory Gallagher, 1971), Arthur Brown (Faster Than the Speed of Light, 1979), Peter Green, Richard Wahnfried, and Dexys Midnight Runners (Don't Stand Me Down, 1985). In 1983, he was part of the one-off blues outfit, Katmandu, with Ray Dorset, Len Surtees, and Peter Green, who recorded the album A Case for the Blues.

As a result of his mental health issues, Crane died of a deliberate overdose of painkillers in 1989 at age 45.

== Discography ==
=== Solo ===
- 1997: Taro Rota (recorded in the late 1970s, Arthur Brown erroneously credited on release)

=== The Crazy World of Arthur Brown ===
- 1968: The Crazy World of Arthur Brown

=== Atomic Rooster ===
- 1970: Atomic Roooster
- 1970: Death Walks Behind You
- 1971: In Hearing of Atomic Rooster
- 1972: Made in England
- 1973: Nice 'n' Greasy
- 1980: Atomic Rooster
- 1983: Headline News

=== Katmandu ===
- 1983: A Case for the Blues

=== Collaborations (incomplete) ===
- 1971: Rory Gallagher (with Rory Gallagher), piano on two tracks
- 1979: Faster Than the Speed of Light (with Arthur Brown)
- 1985: Don't Stand Me Down (with Dexys Midnight Runners)
