= Love and War =

Love and War may refer to:

== Books ==
- Love and War, a 1984 novel by John Jakes in the North and South trilogy
- Love and War (Dragonlance), a 1987 anthology of Dragonlance fantasy short stories
- Love and War (Cornell novel), a 1992 novel based on the TV series Doctor Who

== Film and television ==
- Love & War (TV series), a 1990s American sitcom
- Love and War (Iraqi TV series), 2003
- Love and War (Australian TV series), 1967
- Love and War (2006 film), a Swedish animated film
- Love and War (1967 film), an Australian TV movie
- The Clinic for Married Couples: Love and War, a South Korean TV program
- Mohabbat Aur Jung (lit. 'Love and War'), a 1998 Indian film

== Music ==
=== Albums ===
- Love and War (Tamar Braxton album), 2013
- Love + War (Lillian Axe album), 1989
- Love + War (Kwabs album), 2015
- Love & War (Daniel Merriweather album), 2009
- Love & War (BarlowGirl album), 2009
- Love & War (Jerzee Monét album), 2002
- Love and War, by The Pets
- Love and War (Brad Paisley album), 2017
- Love and War (EP), by ZZ Ward, 2015

=== Songs ===
- "Love & War" (song), by Kodak Black
- "Love and War" (Banks & Steelz song)
- "Love and War" (Tamar Braxton song)
- "Love and War", a single by Desensitized from Desensitized 2004
- "Love and War", a single by Metro Station from Gold 2014
- "Love and War", a song by Neil Young from Le Noise 2010
- "Love and War", a song by Rita Ora from Ora 2012
- "Love and War", a song by Diane Birch from Speak a Little Louder 2013
- "Love and War", a song by Anthony Hamilton from Soulife 2005
- "Love and War (11/11/46)", a song by Rilo Kiley from More Adventurous 2004

== See also ==
- Love and War in the Apennines, a 1971 World War II memoir by Eric Newby
- Palaran: Poems of Love and War, classical composition by Jack Body
- In Love and War (disambiguation)
- "Love in War", a 2003 song by Outkast
- Love Is War (disambiguation)
