= Wasted Youth (Girl album) =

Studio album by Girl
- Released: 1982
- Genres: Glam rock; hard rock
- Length: 37:44
- Label: Jet
- Producers: Nigel Thomas; Girl

Girl chronology
Sheer Greed (1980)	Wasted Youth (1982)	Killing Time (1997)

Singles from Wasted Youth
- 1. "Thru The Twilight" Released: 1981; 2. "Old Dogs" Released: 1982

Professional ratings
Review scores
Source	Rating
AllMusic	2.5/5 stars
Collector's Guide to Heavy Metal	7/10
Record Mirror	1/5 stars

Wasted Youth is the second and final album released by the British glam rock band Girl. Bryson Graham replaced drummer Pete Barnacle during the recording of this album, and contributed to the songwriting process. A remastered CD was reissued by Rock Candy Records in 2016 complete with a bonus CD of a concert recorded in October 1981.

== Track listing ==
Side one

1. "Thru the Twilight" (Phil Collen, Phil Lewis) – 3:25
2. "Old Dogs" (Gerry Laffy, Lewis) – 3:40
3. "Ice in the Blood" (Bryson Graham) – 3:00
4. "Wasted Youth" (G. Laffy, Lewis) – 4:42
5. "Standard Romance" (G. Laffy, Lewis) – 3:58

Side two

6. "Nice 'n' Nasty" (T. Jack) – 3:07
7. "McKitty's Back" (Collen, Lewis) – 4:04
8. "19" (Collen, G. Laffy, Lewis) – 4:49
9. "Overnight Angels" (Collen, G. Laffy, Lewis) – 4:06
10. "Sweet Kids" (Collen, Lewis) – 2:33

== Personnel ==
- Phil Lewis – vocals
- Phil Collen – guitar
- Gerry Laffy – guitar
- Simon Laffy – bass
- Pete Barnacle – credited as a band member but does not play
- Bryson Graham – drums

== Charts ==
Chart (1982)	Peak position
UK Albums (Official Charts)	77
