= Live at the Exposition Hall, Osaka, Japan =

Live album by Girl
- Released: July 2001
- Recorded: May 1982
- Venues: Exposition Hall, Osaka, Japan
- Genres: Glam rock, hard rock
- Length: 70:26
- Label: Receiver Records

Girl chronology
Live at the Marquee (2001)	Live at the Exposition Hall, Osaka, Japan (2001)	My Number: The Anthology (2001)

Live at the Exposition Hall, Osaka, Japan is a live album by the British glam rock band Girl, originally recorded in 1982.

== Track listing ==
1. "Wasted Youth" - 3:31
2. "Make It Medical" - 4:50
3. "My Number" - 3:33
4. "Heartbreak America" - 2:38
5. "Little Miss Ann" - 3:18
6. "Ice in the Blood" - 3:57
7. "Family at War" - 5:01
8. "Mad for It" - 4:53
9. "Tush" - 3:34 (ZZ Top cover)
10. "Old Dogs" - 3:22
11. "Strawberries" - 3:25
12. "Standard Romance" - 4:27
13. "Passing Clouds" - 5:17
14. "Nineteen" - 5:31
15. "Overnight Angels" - 4:53
16. "Hollywood Tease" - 3:07
17. "This Town" - 5:09

== Personnel ==
- Phil Lewis - lead vocals
- Pete Bonas - guitar
- Gerry Laffy - guitar
- Simon Laffy - bass
- Bryson Graham - drums
