= Killing Time (Girl album) =

Compilation album by Girl
- Released: 16 April 1997
- Genre: Glam rock, hard rock
- Length: 67:26
- Label: Crown Records (Japan)

Girl chronology
Wasted Youth (1982)	Killing Time (1997)	Live at the Marquee (2001)

Professional ratings
Review scores
Source	Rating
Allmusic	3/5 stars

Killing Time is a British glam rock band Girl compilation album that was released after the band broke up. It was made with leftover tracks from the recording sessions of their two studio albums and unpublished tracks for a third studio album never released.

== Track listing ==
1. "Juliet" (Russ Ballard) – 4:16
2. "Nut Bush City Limits" – 2:34 (Tina Turner) (Ike & Tina Turner cover)
3. "Mad for It" (Gerry Laffy) – 3:47
4. "White Prophet" (Phil Collen, Phil Lewis) – 2:47
5. "Green Light" (Laffy) – 2:58
6. "This Town" (Laffy, Lewis) – 3:11
7. "Aeroplane Food" (Gary Holton) – 2:48
8. "Make It Medical" (Collen, Laffy, Lewis) – 2:57
9. "Nothing but the Night" (Lewis) – 3:55
10. "Big Night Out" (Collen, Lewis) – 4:10
11. "I Got Love" (Laffy, Lewis) – 2:55
12. "Lucky" (???) – 3:30
13. "Killing Time" (Collen, Lewis) – 3:23
14. "Naughty Boy" (Collen, Lewis) – 3:25
15. "King Rat" (Lewis) – 3:19
16. "Mogal" (Lewis) – 3:49
17. "Love Is a Game" (Ballard) – 3:17
18. "Black Max" (Laffy, Lewis) - 3:19
19. "The Sound of Cars" (Laffy, Lewis) – 4:39
20. "You Really Got Me" (Ray Davies) - 2:27 (The Kinks Cover)

== Personnel ==
- Phil Lewis - lead vocals
- Phil Collen - guitar
- Gerry Laffy - guitar
- Simon Laffy - bass
- Pete Barnacle - drums
- Bryson Graham - drums
