= Sheer Greed =

Studio album by Girl
- Released: January 1980
- Genres: Hard rock; glam rock
- Length: 37:16
- Label: Jet
- Producers: Chris Tsangarides; Nick Tauber; Girl

Girl chronology
Sheer Greed (1980)	Wasted Youth (1982)

Singles from Sheer Greed
- 1. "My Number" Released: 1979; 2. "Hollywood Tease" Released: 1980; 3. "Heartbreak America" Released: 1980; 4. "Love is a Game" Released: 1980

Professional ratings
Review scores
Source	Rating
AllMusic	3/5 stars
Billboard	(unrated)
Collector's Guide to Heavy Metal	7/10
Record Mirror	3.5/5 stars

Sheer Greed is the first album of the British glam rock band Girl, released in January 1980 by Jet Records. The album was published during the explosion of the new wave of British heavy metal phenomenon and its sales took advantage of the favourable attitude towards hard rock bands in the UK in that period. Sheer Greed peaked at No. 33 in the UK Albums Chart. Hollywood Tease was released as a single, and reached No. 50.

The song "Hollywood Tease" was later covered by the bands L.A. Guns (featuring Phil Lewis) and Sheer Greed (featuring Gerry and Simon Laffy). The American glam metal band Lillian Axe recorded a version of "My Number" on the album Love + War in 1989.

"Do You Love Me?" is a cover of a song from Kiss' 1976 album Destroyer.

== Track listing ==
Side one

1. "Hollywood Tease" (Phil Lewis, Phil Collen) – 2:39
2. "The Things You Say" (Lewis, Gerry Laffy) – 3:53
3. "Lovely Lorraine" (Lewis, Collen, G. Laffy) – 2:36
4. "Strawberries" (Lewis) – 2:54
5. "Little Miss Ann" (Lewis, G. Laffy) – 2:40
6. "Doctor Doctor" (Lewis, Collen, G. Laffy) – 2:42

Side two

7. "Do You Love Me?" (Paul Stanley, Bob Ezrin, Kim Fowley) – 3:17
8. "Take Me Dancing" (Lewis, Collen, G. Laffy) – 2:29
9. "What's Up?" (G. Laffy, Simon Laffy) – 2:33
10. "Passing Clouds" (Lewis) – 4:58
11. "My Number" (Lewis, G. Laffy) – 3:52
12. "Heartbreak America" (Lewis) – 2:43

2016 CD Reissue Bonus Tracks

1. "You Really Got Me" (The Kinks cover) – 2:47
2. "Love is a Game" (Russ Ballard cover) – 3:20

== Personnel ==
=== Band members ===
- Phil Lewis – lead vocals
- Phil Collen – lead guitar, backing vocals
- Gerry Laffy – rhythm guitar, backing vocals
- Simon Laffy – bass guitar, backing vocals
- Dave Gaynor – drums, backing vocals

=== Production ===
- Chris Tsangarides – producer, engineer
- Nick Tauber – producer on tracks 3, 7, 10, 12
- Dougie Bennet – engineer on tracks 3, 7, 10, 12

== Charts ==
Chart (1980)	Peak position
UK Albums (Official Charts)	33
