= Live at the Marquee (Girl album) =

Live album by Girl
- Released: 13 February 2001
- Recorded: 23 October 1981
- Venue: The Marquee, London
- Genre: Glam rock, hard rock
- Length: 44:45
- Label: Receiver Records

Girl chronology
Killing Time (1997)	Live at the Marquee (2001)	Live at the Exposition Hall, Osaka, Japan (2001)

Professional ratings
Review scores
Source	Rating
Allmusic	2/5 stars

Live at the Marquee is a live album by the British glam rock band Girl, recorded in 1981 and released in 2001. The album is included as the bonus disc of the 2016 Rock Candy Records re-issue of Girl's 1982 album Wasted Youth.

== Track listing ==
1. "Ice in My Blood" - 3:23
2. "Icey Blue" - 3:24
3. "Mad for It" - 3:59
4. "Overnight Angels" - 4:48
5. "Old Dogs" - 3:27
6. "Big Night" - 4:34
7. "Sweet Kids" - 2:34
8. "Wasted Youth" - 3:39
9. "Nice 'n' Nasty" - 3:04
10. "My Number" - 4:18
11. "Standard Romance" - 4:09
12. "Thru the Twilight" - 3:26

== Personnel ==
- Phil Lewis - lead vocals
- Phil Collen - guitar
- Gerry Laffy - guitar
- Simon Laffy - bass
- Pete Barnacle - drums
