= Pete Barnacle =

- Born: Peter Barnacle; England
- Genres: Rock, hard rock, punk rock, post-punk, heavy metal
- Occupations: Musician, songwriter, English teacher
- Instruments: Drums, percussion
- Years active: 1976–present
- Member of: GoDoG
- Formerly of: Girl; Broken Home; Sheer Greed; Gillan; Hard Rain; Spear of Destiny; Theatre of Hate; Soldiers of Fortune; Strange Cruise; Yngwie Malmsteen

Pete Barnacle is an English rock drummer who has played for various bands including Gillan, Girl, Broken Home, Spear of Destiny, Theatre of Hate, Yngwie Malmsteen (on the 1990 Eclipse World Tour), Sheer Greed, and Soldiers of Fortune. Barnacle now lives in Japan, teaching English, and occasionally working as a drummer.

== Career ==
Pete Barnacle was a member of Gillan in 1979 touring in Japan, then was part of Broken Home. He joined Girl in 1981, playing alongside Phil Collen. He played on Strange Cruise's self-titled debut album in 1986 before joining Spear Of Destiny in 1987, playing on three albums: Outland (1987), Price You Pay (1988) and SOD's Law in 1992. This band also toured in 1991 billed as Theatre Of Hate.

Since 2006, formed the band GoDoG together Sakate Sōtarō and Hashimoto Hiroyuk.

== With Gillan ==
The line-up of Gillan in which he played was:

- Ian Gillan - lead vocals
- Steve Byrd - guitar
- John McCoy - bass
- Colin Towns - keyboards
- Pete Barnacle - drums

Ian Gillan also sang for the bands Deep Purple, Ian Gillan Band and Black Sabbath.

Barnacle is named as a musician on Gillan's self-titled album although he never actually played on the album, but performed live with the band.

== With Girl ==
The line-up of Girl in which he played was:

- Phil Lewis - lead vocals
- Phil Collen - guitar
- Gerry Laffy - guitar
- Simon Laffy - bass
- Pete Barnacle- drums

Pete Barnacle played on the Girl albums Killing Time and Live at the Marquee.

== With Broken Home ==
Broken Home were:

- Jeff Dicken - guitar, vocals
- Rory Wilson - guitar, vocals
- Pete Crowther - bass, guitar, keyboards
- Pete Barnacle - drums, percussion, vocals

Broken Home released a self-titled album, which was produced by Robert John "Mutt" Lange.

== With Spear of Destiny ==
Spear of Destiny were:

(1987)

- Kirk Brandon - vocals, guitar
- Volker Janssen - keyboards
- Mick Procter - guitar
- Steve Barnacle - bass
- Pete Barnacle - drums

(1988)

- Kirk Brandon - vocals, guitar
- Chris Bostock - bass
- Volker Janssen - keyboards
- Pete Barnacle - drums

== With Theatre of Hate ==
(1991)

- Kirk Brandon - vocals, guitar
- Stan Stammers - bass guitar
- John 'Boy' Lennard - saxophone
- Mark 'Gemini' Thwaite - lead and rhythm guitar, bass guitar
- Pete Barnacle - drums

Pete was a member of Spear of Destiny from 1987 to 1989, recording two albums (Outlands and The Price You Pay) touring extensively in the UK and mainland Europe, and making numerous TV appearances. He returned with Theatre of Hate in 1991 for the Return to 8 Tour, and again in 1992 with Spear of Destiny after his stint with Yngwie Malmsteen, for a tour and the Sod's Law album.

== With Sheer Greed ==
Sheer Greed were:

- Gerry Laffy- lead vocals and guitar
- Neil Gabbitas- guitar
- Simon Laffy- bass
- Pete Barnacle- drums

Phil Lewis and Phil Collen also made guest appearances with Sheer Greed.

== With Yngwie Malmsteen ==
The line-up on Yngwie Malmsteen's Eclipse Tour was:

- Yngwie Malmsteen - guitar, vocals
- Goran Edman - lead vocals
- Svante Henryson - bass
- Mats Olausson - keyboards
- Pete Barnacle - drums

== With Soldiers of Fortune ==
Soldiers of Fortune are:

- Masanobu Yasui - guitar
- Yasunori Kusanobu - bass
- Pete Barnacle - drums, vocals
- Masaki Fujii - lead vocals

This band was formed in Okayama, Japan, in 2002. They have released one CD, Fighting to Survive, on Storm Force Records, and played numerous live shows up and down Japan.

Preceded by Dave Gaynor	Girl drummer	Succeeded by Bryson Graham
