= Clash of Loyalties =

1983 Iraqi film by Mohamed Shukri Jameel

Al-Mas'ala Al-Kubra
- The official poster of the movie
- Directed by: Mohamed Shukri Jameel
- Written by: Ramadan Gatea Mozan, Lateif Jorephani and Mohamed Shukri Jameel
- Produced by: Saddam Hussein; Lateif Jorephani; Iraqi Film and Theater Foundation
- Starring: Oliver Reed; John Barron; James Bolam; Helen Ryan; Sami Abdul Hameed; Qasim Al-Malak
- Narrated by: Michael Hordern
- Cinematography: Jack Hildyard and Majid Kamel
- Edited by: Bill Blunden
- Music by: Ron Goodwin
- Distributed by: Iraqi Film Corporation
- Release date: 1983
- Running time: 184 minutes
- Country: Iraq
- Languages: Arabic; English
- Budget: $24 mil

Clash of Loyalties (Arabic: المسألة الكبرى, romanized: al-masʿāla al-kubrā, lit. 'The Great Question') is a 1983 Iraqi film focusing on the formation of Iraq out of Mesopotamia in the aftermath of the First World War.

The film was financed by Saddam Hussein, filmed in Iraq (mainly at the Baghdad Film Studios in Baghdad's Mansour neighbourhood and on location at the Tigris-Euphrates marshlands, Babylon and Kut) at the height of the Iran–Iraq War and starred Oliver Reed as Gerard Leachman, Marc Sinden as Captain Dawson and Helen Ryan as Gertrude Bell, with score by Ron Goodwin.

Investigative journalist James Montague, writing in the July 2014 issue of Esquire magazine, claimed that Marc Sinden spied for the British Government's Secret Intelligence Service (MI6) during the filming of Clash of Loyalties in Iraq, after being made "an offer he couldn't refuse, appealing to his duty and his pride in Queen and Country." In the article, Sinden admitted that it was true.

Both Arab and English versions of the film were produced.

== Production ==
The state-run General Organization for Cinema had gained some autonomy in 1964, but had largely focused on making documentaries. Starting in 1977, it focused on feature film production, turning to large-budget epics in the 1980s. Already in the 1970s, it was clear that even privately funded movies could be used for political tools, and this situation intensified with the rise of Saddam Hussein. Eventually, nearly all films were used for propaganda purposes. For example, the 1981 film Al-Qadisiyya cost $15 million and reinforced "messages of Arab unity and to inflame popular support for Saddam Hussein".

By 1983, the Iran-Iraq War had been going on for three years, and Saddam wanted a film to boost the people's morale. The 1920 revolution against the British seemed like a proper topic for such a film, since it had become revered by Iraqi nationalists as a "defining moment in emerging national identity", and had been invoked in Iraqi poetry, theater, and film. Saddam Hussein would fund $30-million into this historical epic, not only in "a vain attempt to stir up national feeling" but also to "link his Ba'ath party to the Iraqi revolutionaries who overturned British rule in 1920." The film project was initially called The Great Question, but the title would later change to A Clash of Loyalties. Mohamed Shukri Jameel, seen at the time as "Iraq's greatest living director", was chosen to direct.

Although Iraqi films were now serving nationalist purposes, they were, ironically, still largely co-produced. The film was a co-production between British and Iraqi producers. Two versions of the script - one in English and one in Arabic - were written. British technicians were used. Most of all, British talents were employed in key positions: James Bolam and Oliver Reed were to act, Ron Goodwin was to write the score, and Ken Buckle was the head stuntman. Many of the British actors accepted roles based on the large paycheques, with even minor characters getting paid £1,000 a week.

The seriousness of the situation struck many British actors when they arrived. The civilian planes had to fly through Iraqi airspace under the escort of military jets, and they had to land without lights to avoid a missile attack. They were taken to "one decent hotel", but even those rooms the actors found themselves in a "half-built accommodation infested with cockroaches".

While Jameel claimed that Oliver Reed was well behaved, co-stars remembered otherwise. Actor Marc Sinden recalled numerous stories that showcased the actor's infamous behavior. Upon arriving at the hotel in Baghdad for the first time, Sinden was greeted with Reed being hung by his ankle outside a window, with his own bodyguard shouting, "Do not say that again!" According to Sinden, "We never did find out what Olly said." While onset he would remember his lines and never show up drunk. However, offset, Reed would "drink whiskey by the bottle, force anybody that passed him into an impromptu arm-wrestle", and "show off recently taken Polaroids of himself" in sexual acts with his seventeen-year old girlfriend (later wife). While dining with Saddam Hussein and other actors, Reed blurted out loud, in English and referencing Hussein, "What a c---!" Actress Helen Ryan said at restaurants, "If the hors d'oeuvres didn't arrive fast enough, Oliver would shout for the manager and when the manager came he would get him by the scruff of the neck, lift him up into the air and throw him across the room." Iraqi producer Lateif Jorephani recalled that Reed filled up a bottle of wine with his own urine, called the waiter, and told him to "take this bottle of good wine to the next table with his compliments". For this stunt, Reed was nearly removed from production by Saddam's officials, and only Jorephani's intervention kept him in the film. Actress Virginia Denham said the only thing that frightened her about filming the movie was Oliver Reed, whom she described as "a weapon of mass destruction".

Filming took place near the Iraqi city of Kut, some 170-kilometers from Baghdad. Sinden recalled that Jameel "had a unique Michael Winner-style of directing, and he had a riding crop that he'd use to hit the extras". Working out in the desert, the heat often reached 50 °C (122 °F). Iraqi technicians and actors were constantly having to leave production due to being called up to fight on the front. Although production generally stayed away from the frontlines of the war, a disused section of railway needed for a train explosion was close to the Iran-Iraq border. Following the stunt, Iran claimed to have blown up an Iraqi military train.

The film was the last one made to use the now-banned "Running W" technique, invented by famed stuntman Yakima (Yak) Canutt, which was a method of bringing down a horse at the gallop by attaching a wire, anchored to the ground, to its fetlocks and so launching the rider forwards spectacularly at a designated point. It invariably killed the horse, or at best it was unrideable afterwards. Buckle (who had been trained by Yak) performed the highly-dangerous stunt three times during the huge cavalry charge sequence.

Jameel often found himself at odds with the Iraqi Ministry of Culture. They desired the film to be "a way to immortalize the virtues of Iraq's fighting spirit against a seemingly superior foe," while Jameel wanted to emphasize the "clash of loyalties" not only between the Iraqis, but the British as well. He would later opine, "I tried to save the film from their propaganda; they loved propaganda. But because my ideas were so simple and good they thought I was more English than Iraqi. They didn't like it." Many changes were indeed made to fit with the modern political climate: for example, the Sunni tribes were emphasized over the Shi'a, and Hussein's hometown of Tikrit was portrayed as a center of revolt when in fact no rising had happened there.

== Release and reception ==
Jameel ended up being very happy with the finished product, saying, "I couldn't believe it turned out so beautiful." According to him, Saddam Hussein said he liked the film as well, and "told the Minister of Public Relations to gather all the governors and the ministers and show them the film." Jorephani was awarded with "a gold watch with a picture of the dictator on it". Some Iraqis complained that Jameel "didn't show enough about the champions of the revolution against the British, the Shi'a." Other Iraqi critics pointed out that the hero is portrayed like the hero of a Hollywood western, while King Faisel is portrayed as a nationalist leader rather than a "compliant would-be ruler to be imposed by the British".

The film was nominated for the Golden Prize at the 13th Moscow International Film Festival in 1983. Jameel later remarked that he felt it "deserved to win an Oscar and was hurt by the oversight". It was screened at the 1984 London Film Festival, but was not otherwise shown theatrically in the United Kingdom, and in general failed to achieve the international distribution sought after by the General Organization for Cinema. Part of the difficulty in finding a distributor was reportedly because "much more was known about Saddam Hussein and the nature of his totalitarian regime." A 2026 retrospective piece by the BBC said Clash of Loyalties "was viewed by only a few hundred people" and was ultimately "consigned to canisters in [producer Lateif] Jorephani's garage in Surrey, England."

American journalist Jon Lee Anderson saw an old videotape copy in Iraq, and described Reed's demise, where he "flops around repeatedly like a hooked trout", as "one of the most badly acted death scenes in cinematic history".

== Cast ==
- Yousef al-Any as Blind Leader
- Ghazi al-Takriti as Dhari al-Mahmood
- Bernard Archard as Sir Percy Cox
- John Barron as General Haldane
- James Bolam as A. T. Wilson
- Helen Cherry as Lady Cox
- Barrie Cookson as Colonel Hardcastle
- Sami Abdul Hameed as Nationalist Leader
- Oliver Reed as Colonel Leachman
- Helen Ryan as Gertrude Bell
- Marc Sinden as Captain Dawson
- Michael Hordern as the Narrator (English version)

== See also ==
- Lion of the Desert, similar Libyan film financed by Gaddafi
