= Poetic justice (disambiguation) =

Poetic justice is a literary device.

Poetic justice may also refer to:

== Film and television ==
- Poetic Justice (film), a 1993 film by John Singleton
- Poetic Justice, a 1972 film from Hollis Frampton's Hapax Legomena cycle
- Poetic Justice (TV series), a 2012 Singaporean Chinese-language drama series
- "Poetic Justice" (The Jeffersons), a 1982 TV episode
- "Poetic Justice" (Porridge), a 1977 TV episode

== Literature ==
- Poetic Justice, a 1996 historical novel by Nigel Tranter

== Music ==
- Poetic Justice (Lillian Axe album) or the title song, 1992
- Poetic Justice (Stan Rogers album), two radio plays with music by Rogers, 1996
- Poetic Justice (Steve Harley album), 1996
- Poetic Justice (soundtrack), from the film, 1993
- "Poetic Justice" (song), by Kendrick Lamar, 2012
