= Love + War (Lillian Axe album) =

Studio album by Lillian Axe
- Released: July 20, 1989
- Genre: Glam metal
- Length: 47:42
- Label: MCA
- Producer: Tony Platt

Lillian Axe chronology
Lillian Axe (1988)	Love + War (1989)	(1987–1989) Out of the Darkness – Into the Light (1991)

Love + War is the second studio album by the American glam metal band Lillian Axe, released in 1989. The album was reissued and remastered by Metal Mind Productions in 2007. "My Number" was originally written and recorded by the NWOBHM-era band Girl for their first album, Sheer Greed (1980). The album cover features Sharon Case, who made appearances on General Hospital.

== Critical reception ==
Professional ratings
Review scores
Source	Rating
AllMusic	2.5/5 stars
Rock Hard	8/10

In 2005, Love + War was ranked number 296 in Rock Hard magazine's book The 500 Greatest Rock & Metal Albums of All Time.

== Track listing ==
All tracks are written by Steve Blaze except for "My Number" written by Phil Lewis and Gerry Laffy

No.	Title	Length
1.	"All's Fair in Love and War"	5:59
2.	"She Likes It on Top"	3:56
3.	"Diana"	4:47
4.	"Down on You"	4:24
5.	"The World Stopped Turning"	5:01
6.	"Ghost of Winter"	6:19
7.	"My Number"	3:32
8.	"Show a Little Love"	4:36
9.	"Fool's Paradise"	4:43
10.	"Letters in the Rain"	4:25

== Personnel ==
- Ron Taylor – lead vocals
- Steve Blaze – lead guitar, backing vocals, keyboards
- Jon Ster – rhythm guitar, backing vocals, keyboards
- Rob Stratton – bass guitar
- Danny King – drums
