= John Clifford (minister) =

British Baptist minister and politician (1836–1923)

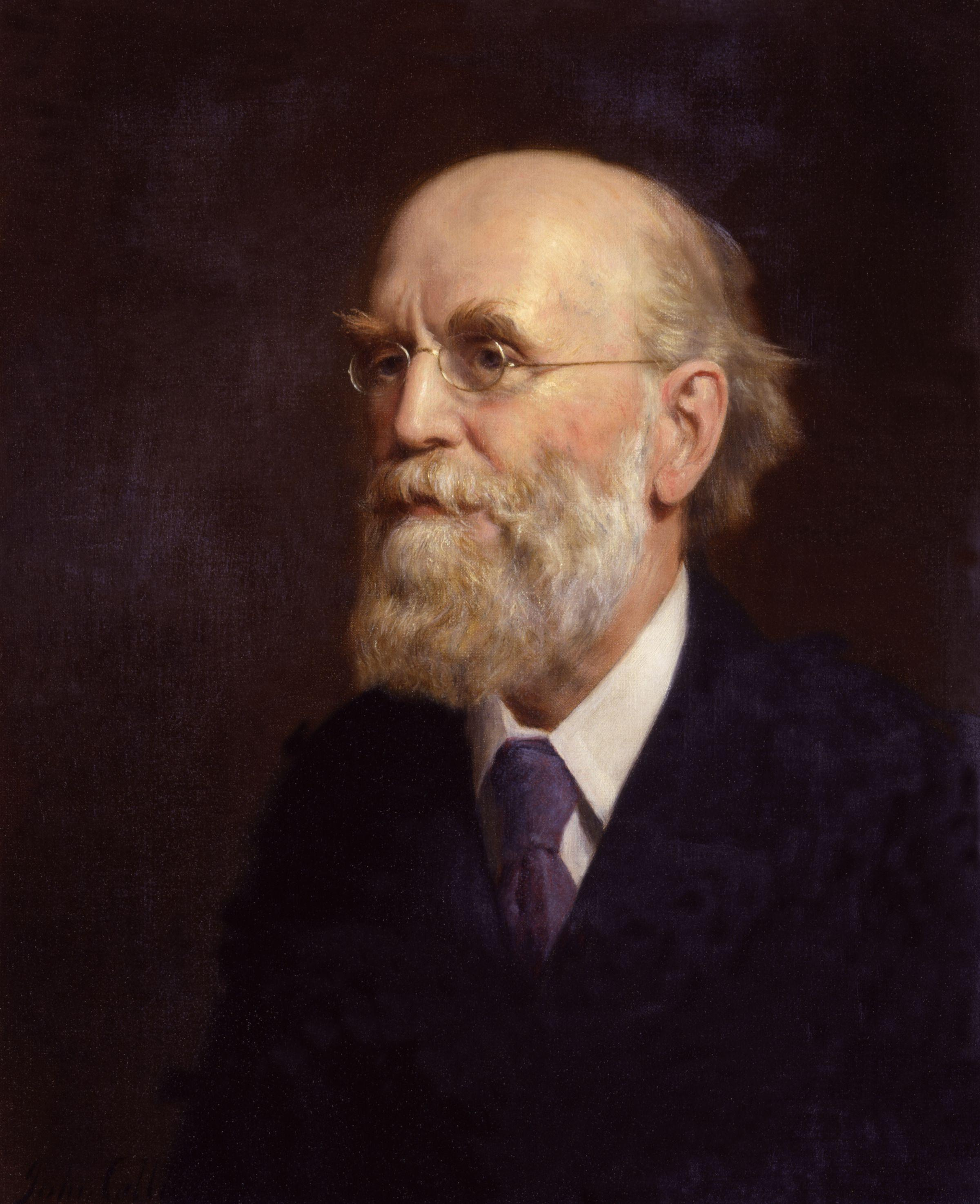
John Clifford

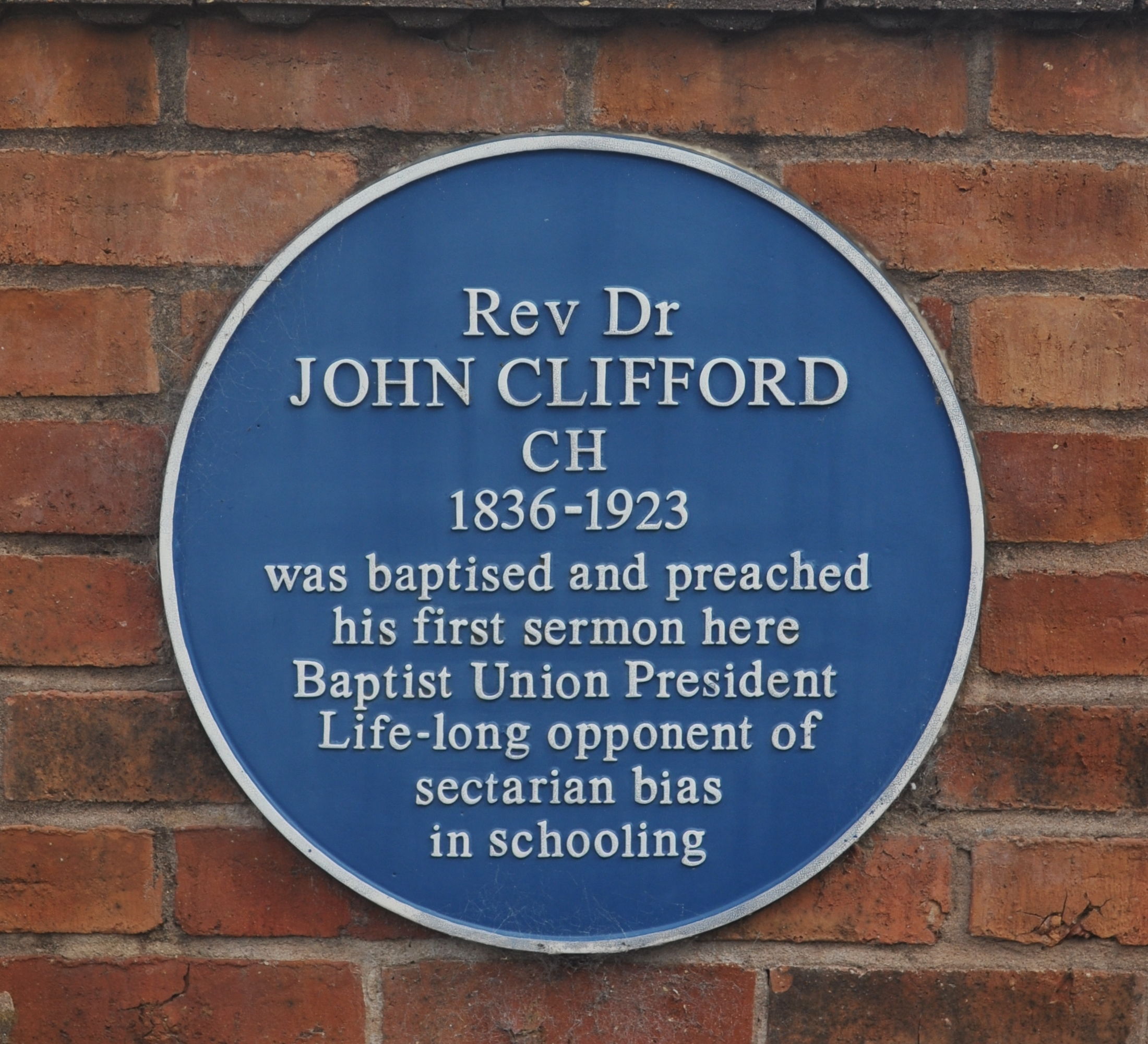
Blue plaque commemorating John Clifford at the former General Baptist Chapel, Beeston, Nottinghamshire, now Church House Nursery

John Clifford CH (16 October 1836 in Sawley, Derbyshire – 20 November 1923 in London) was a British Baptist Nonconformist minister and politician, who became famous as the advocate of passive resistance to the Education Act 1902.

== Biography ==
Clifford was son of a warp-machinist. As a boy, he worked in a lace factory, where he attracted the notice of the leaders of the Baptist community, who sent him to the academy at Leicester and the Baptist college at Nottingham to be educated for the ministry. In 1858, he was called to the Praed Street chapel, Paddington (London), and while officiating there he attended University College and pursued his education by working at the British Museum.

He matriculated at the University of London (1859), and took its Bachelor of Arts degree (1861), Bachelor of Science (1862), Master of Arts (1864), and Bachelor of Laws (1866), and in 1883 he was given the honorary degree of DD by Bates College, United States, being known thereafter as Dr Clifford. This degree, from a small American college, afterwards led to sarcastic allusions, but Clifford had not courted it. Clifford's achievements at the University of London provided evidence of his intellectual equipment.

=== Ministry ===
At the Praed Street chapel, he gradually obtained a large following, and in 1877 the Westbourne Park chapel was opened for him. As a preacher, writer, propagandist and ardent Liberal politician, he became a power in the Nonconformist body. He was president of the London Baptist Association in 1879, of the Baptist Union in 1888 and 1899, and of the National Council of Evangelical Churches in 1898. He was instrumental in ensuring that the Baptist Union endorsed the liberal side in the Downgrade controversy, and in arranging the censure of Charles Spurgeon.

In 1899, he became a prominent campaigner against the Boer War. He was on the South Africa Conciliation Committee executive and he was president of the Stop the War Committee. As well as being a critic of the British treatment of the Boers he was a critic of the Union of South Africa's negotiated terms because of the un-equal treatment of the majority black population in the country.

His chief prominence in politics, however, dates from 1903 onwards in consequence of his advocacy of passive resistance to the Education Act 1902. He threw himself into this movement with militant ardour, his own goods being distrained upon, with those of numerous other Nonconformists, rather than that any contribution should be made by them in taxation for the purpose of an Education Act, which they believed to be calculated to support denominational religious teaching in the schools.

The passive resistance movement, with Clifford as its chief leader, had a large share in the defeat of the Unionist government in January 1906, and his efforts were then directed to getting a new act passed which should be nondenominational in character. The rejection of Augustine Birrell's bill in 1906 by the House of Lords was accordingly accompanied by denunciations of that body from Clifford and his followers. However, year by year went by, with nothing but failure on the part of the Liberal ministry to arrive at any solution of the education problem.

Failure was now due not to the House of Lords but the inherent difficulties of the subject, as it became increasingly clear to the public generally that the easy denunciations of the Education Act 1902, which had played so large a part in the elections of 1906, were not so simple to carry into practice. A compromise, in which the denominationalists would have their say, was the result. Meanwhile, passive resistance lost its interest though Clifford and his followers continued to protest against their treatment.

Clifford resigned his position at the Westbourne Park chapel in 1915, and was president of the National Brotherhood Council from 1916 to 1919. He was appointed Companion of Honour (CH) in the 1921 New Year Honours.

== Influence ==
Mahatma Gandhi quoted Dr Clifford as one of the early models of passive resistance before developing Satyagraha as a more complete concept than just passive resistance.
