= Back to Babylon =

Back to Babylon may refer to:

- Back to Babylon (album), an album by the band Tormé
- Back to Babylon (film), a 2002 documentary film
