= Edward the Seventh =

Television series

- Also known as: Edward the King; The Royal Victorians
- Genre: Historical drama
- Written by: David Butler; John Gorrie; Philip Magnus
- Directed by: John Gorrie
- Starring: Annette Crosbie; Timothy West; Helen Ryan; Robert Hardy; Felicity Kendal
- Theme music composer: Cyril Ornadel
- Country of origin: United Kingdom
- Original languages: English; German; French
- No. of series: 1
- No. of episodes: 13

Production
- Producers: Cecil Clarke; Lorna Mason
- Cinematography: Tony Imi
- Running time: 50 minutes
- Production company: ATV

Original release
- Network: ITV
- Release: 1 April – 1 July 1975

Edward the Seventh is a 1975 British historical drama series, made by ATV in 13 episodes.

Based on the biography of King Edward VII by Philip Magnus, it stars Annette Crosbie as Queen Victoria, Timothy West as the elder Edward VII, with Simon Gipps-Kent and Charles Sturridge as Edward during his youth. Helen Ryan and Deborah Grant featured as the elder and younger Queen Alexandra respectively. It was directed by John Gorrie, who wrote episodes 7–10 with David Butler writing the remainder of the series.

Only the final three episodes dramatised Edward as King (in line with his short, nine-year reign, which did not begin until he was nearly sixty years old). Annette Crosbie, who won a BAFTA for her performance, was given top billing in the series (appearing in ten out of the thirteen episodes).

It was first broadcast on TV between April and July 1975. In the United States it was shown under the title Edward the King, with episode introductions by Canadian-American broadcaster Robert MacNeil. In the UK, it is available as a four-disc DVD set, encoded for Region 0, by Network Video. It is also available for the North American market as a no-extras six-disc set.

== Series cast ==
=== Royalty ===
- Annette Crosbie as Queen Victoria (episodes 1–10)
- Timothy West as Albert Edward ("Bertie"), Prince of Wales, later King Edward VII (episodes 5–13)
- Helen Ryan as Princess Alexandra, later Queen Alexandra (episodes 6–13)
- Robert Hardy as Prince Albert (episodes 1–4)
- Felicity Kendal as Bertie's older sister Princess Vicky, later Empress Frederick of Germany (episodes 2–5, 8, 10 and 11)
- Michael Byrne as Fritz, later Frederick III, German Emperor (episodes 2–5, 8)
- Charles Sturridge as Young Bertie (episodes 2–4)
- Simon Gipps-Kent as Younger Bertie (episode 2)
- Deborah Grant as Young Alexandra (episodes 4–5)
- Christopher Neame as Bertie's nephew Kaiser Wilhelm II (episodes 8 and 10–13)
- Gwyneth Strong as Minny (young Dagmar) (episodes 4–5)
- Jane Lapotaire as Empress Marie of Russia (older Dagmar; Dagmar was the sister of Bertie's wife Alexandra and later wife of Tsar Alexander III) (episodes 6–8, 10, 12–13)
- Alison Leggatt as the Duchess of Kent (episodes 1–3)
- Charles Dance as Bertie's eldest son Prince Eddy (episodes 8–9)
- Michael Osborne as Bertie's second son Prince George, Duke of York, later King George V (episodes 8–13)
- Ian Gelder as Bertie's brother Prince Alfred (episodes 2–6)
- Julian Sherrier as Napoleon III, Emperor of the French (episode 2)
- Chloe Ashcroft as Eugénie, Empress of the French (episode 2)
- Patricia O'Brian as Bertie's younger sister Princess Helena (episode 2)
- Deborah Makepeace as older Princess Helena (episodes 3–6)
- Shirley Steedman as Bertie's younger sister Princess Alice (episodes 3–6)
- Judy Loe as Princess Mary of Teck, later Queen Mary (episodes 9–13)
- Cheryl Campbell as Bertie's youngest sister Princess Beatrice (episodes 8 and 10)
- Anthony Douse as King Christian IX of Denmark (episodes 4, 5 and 12)
- Kathleen Byron as Princess Christian, later Queen Louise of Denmark (episodes 4–6)
- Vanessa Miles as Bertie's eldest daughter Princess Louise (episode 10)
- Madeleine Cannon as Bertie's middle daughter Princess Toria (episode 10)
- Rosalyn Elvin as Bertie's youngest daughter Princess Maud, Queen Maude of Norway (episode 10)
- Bruce Purchase as Tsar Alexander III of Russia (episodes 6–8)
- Michael Billington as Tsar Nicholas II of Russia (episodes 10, 12 and 13)
- Meriel Brooke as Tsarina Alexandra (episodes 10 and 13)
- Paul Greenhalgh as King George I of Greece (episodes 5, 8, 10)
- Geoffrey Wincott as King Wilhelm I of Prussia (episode 6)
- Mel Churcher as Princess Hélène of Orléans (episode 9)

=== Prime ministers and politicians ===
- Joseph O'Conor as Lord Melbourne (episode 1)
- Michael Barrington as Sir Robert Peel (episode 1)
- John Welsh as the Duke of Wellington (episode 1)
- Arthur Hewlett as the Earl of Aberdeen (episode 2)
- André Morell as Lord Palmerston (episodes 2–5)
- Peter Collingwood as Lord John Russell (episode 4–5)
- Michael Hordern as William Ewart Gladstone (episodes 5–6 and 8–10)
- Bryan Coleman as the Earl of Derby (episode 6)
- John Gielgud as Benjamin Disraeli (episodes 6–7)
- Derek Fowlds as Lord Randolph Churchill (episode 7)
- Richard Vernon as Lord Salisbury (episodes 9–11)
- Edward Hardwicke as Lord Rosebery (episodes 9–10)
- Lyndon Brook as A. J. Balfour (episode 10–12)
- Geoffrey Bayldon as Sir Henry Campbell-Bannerman (episode 12–13)
- Angus MacKay as Lord Lansdowne (episodes 11 and 12)
- Basil Dignam as H. H. Asquith (episode 13)
- Geoffrey Beevers as David Lloyd George (episode 13)
- Christopher Strauli as Winston Churchill (episode 13)

=== British Army and Royal Navy ===
- Harry Andrews as Colonel Bruce (episodes 2–4)
- Gareth Thomas as Admiral Lord Charles Beresford (episodes 7 and 9)
- John Normington as Colonel Hon. Oliver Montagu (episodes 7–9)
- Clive Morton as Lieut. Gen. Owen Williams (episode 9)
- James Berwick as Admiral Sir John Fisher (episodes 12–13)

=== Edward's mistresses ===
- Francesca Annis as Lillie Langtry (episodes 7–8)
- Teresa White as Edith Finch, Countess of Aylesford (episode 8)
- Carolyn Seymour as Lady Brooke (episodes 9–10)
- Sally Home as Agnes Keyser (episodes 10 and 13)
- Moira Redmond as Alice Keppel (episodes 10–13)

=== Others ===
- Edward de Souza as Luis de Soveral, Portuguese ambassador (episodes 11–13)
- Patience Collier as Baroness Lehzen (episode 1)
- Noel Willman as Baron Stockmar (episodes 1–2)
- Peter Carlisle as James Buchanan (episode 3)
- Kathryn Leigh Scott as Harriet Lane (episode 3)
- Guy Slater as Lord Carrington (episodes 3–4, 6–8 and 11–12)
- Martin Skinner as Jean-Baptiste Sipido (episode 10)
- Peter Howell as Francis Knollys (episodes 8–10 and 12–13)
- Brewster Mason as Otto von Bismarck (episode 8) (Mason later reprised his role as Bismarck in Disraeli)
- Denis Lill as Frederick Ponsonby (episodes 11–13)
- Barbara Laurenson as Charlotte Knollys (episodes 9–13)
- Basil Hoskins as Lord Esher (episodes 11–13)
- William Dysart as John Brown (episodes 6–8)
- Robert Robinson as Ernest Cassel (episodes 10, 12, 13)
- Adrienne Posta as Marie Lloyd (episode 10)

== Episodes ==
| No. | Title | Original UK release date |
|---|---|---|
| 1 | "The Boy" | 1 April 1975 |
After only a year of marriage, in 1841 Queen Victoria has not only given birth to a daughter but learns that she is again pregnant. The Queen takes her role seriously and is fully engaged in matters of State. She has a good relationship with the Prime Minister, Lord Melbourne and is concerned that her confinement will limit her ability to rule. For her husband, Prince Albert, his limited role in the household causes friction in the marriage. He has no say in the hiring of the household staff or the way his child is cared for, and more importantly he yearns for a role as an adviser in the political realm. The Queen dearly loves Albert and over time, with his close friend, Baron Stockmar, encouraging him to assert himself, Albert slowly establishes himself as the head of the household and becomes an indispensable adviser. The birth of their second child, Prince Albert Edward, provides the line with a male heir. Even though Albert Edward is still only a baby, his father is already planning his education.
| 2 | "An Experiment in Education" | 8 April 1975 |
The young Prince Albert, called Bertie by members of the family, is not having a particularly happy childhood. The elder Prince Albert, encouraged by Baron Stockmar, has very definite views about his son's education including the need for non-stop work, both in the classroom and out, and very strict discipline. Bertie rebels, bewildering and distressing Victoria and Albert, and the only solution seems to be ever more discipline. He is clearly a disappointment to his father, who had hoped his son would be a new kind of leader, a scholar who knows and understands the world but that is clearly not to be. Bertie nonetheless accompanies his parents on a state visit to Paris and charms Napoleon III and Empress Eugenie. Political relations with the French are important as the Crimean War against Russia is underway. Albert, however, soon dismisses his eldest son and spends most of his time ensuring the happiness of his eldest daughter Princess Victoria, known as Vicky. Her marriage to the Crown Prince of Prussia is a sad time for the Queen and the Prince Consort as they miss her greatly, and Bertie feels that he cannot replace his sister in their hearts. Bertie for his part wants to do something useful, but his desires seem to be the furthest thing from his father's mind.
| 3 | "The New World" | 15 April 1975 |
After a successful tour of President Buchanan's United States of America, young Prince Bertie returns home to find that his parents do not see it as a personal success but rather one that can be attributed to the monarchy in general. His father tells him he is to go to University of Oxford to continue his studies but he will still be under the care of a governor and will not be allowed to mix with other students. Bertie really wants to join the army; his father at first refuses, but eventually decides in his favour. He is made a lieutenant colonel in the Grenadier Guards and sent to Ireland to undergo his training. There he sees a few familiar faces and begins an affair with an Irish music hall performer named Nellie Clifden. The situation in Italy creates a conflict for Albert with his relations in the Austrian court. Vicky's son Wilhelm is born with a damaged arm. States in the American South secede, raising the possibility of war. Victoria's mother, the Duchess of Kent, dies.
| 4 | "Alix" | 22 April 1975 |
Prince Bertie continues his military training but has taken to deceiving his superiors and sneaking off with his friends to music halls. His parents continue their search to find Bertie a suitable wife. Their preference is for a German bride, but eventually they settle on Princess Alexandra of Denmark, known to her family as Alix, despite their misgivings due to tensions between Denmark and Prussia over Schleswig-Holstein, a particular concern of Albert's. A brief meeting is arranged for the two at the cathedral in Speyer, but no final decision is made. Relations with his father deteriorate even further when the Prince Consort receives a confidential letter from Baron Stockmar telling of Bertie's dalliance with Nellie Clifden. Bertie is clearly a disappointment to his father, who visits Bertie at Cambridge, and the two manage to reconcile. Prince Albert, after taking a long walk with Bertie in the rain, and exhausted by trying to avert war with the United States despite his failing health, dies of typhoid in December 1861.
| 5 | "A Hundred Thousand Welcomes" | 29 April 1975 |
With Queen Victoria in mourning, the Cabinet is concerned that her withdrawal from public duties will have a negative impact on her people. As a result, Bertie assumes many of the public duties of the monarch. He proves to be quite popular and works hard at maintaining the positive face of the monarchy. It is not quite what Bertie has in mind, but the Queen refuses any role for him in matters of State. She sees him as a failure and refuses to let him participate in any decision-making, blaming him for Prince Albert's death. The Queen also decides that there is no need to wait the full year of mourning before he can marry, and she pushes him to decide on Alix. He and Princess Alix are married in March 1863 and Alix soon after announces that she is expecting a child, and gives birth to Prince Eddy prematurely. Meanwhile, the long-simmering problems between Denmark and Prussia lead to conflict within the family and finally an outbreak of war.
| 6 | "The Invisible Queen" | 6 May 1975 |
Bertie's family continues to grow, but Princess Alix is not strong and suffers from general ill health including a bout of rheumatic fever. Politics continues to cause a rift in the family with Princess Alix refusing to see or have anything to do with Bertie's Prussian relations after the forced annexation by Germany of parts of Denmark. It all comes to a head when the King of Prussia asks to call on her, and Alix attempts to snub him. Queen Victoria continues to refuse all public engagements. Bertie finds himself in court as a witness in a divorce case involving a lady with whom he was acquainted. The defeat of the French Empire in the Franco-Prussian War, and the Queen's seclusion leads to a rise in republicanism. Prime Minister Gladstone tries to have the Queen appoint Bertie as Viceroy of Ireland but she rejects the suggestion. Everyone expects the worst when Bertie contracts typhoid at Sandringham and is near death on the tenth anniversary of his father dying from the same disease.
| 7 | "Dearest Prince" | 13 May 1975 |
Despite being grateful for Bertie's recovery from typhoid, the Queen continues to refuse all attempts at giving him any responsibility in matters of State. After a very successful visit to Coventry, and simultaneously playing host to the Shah of Persia and to Alix's brother-in-law and sister, "Sasha" and "Minnie," the Tsarevich and Tsarevna of Russia, the new Prime Minister Benjamin Disraeli looks for something appropriate for the Prince to do. Bertie suggests that he go on an official State visit to India. To Bertie's surprise and delight, Victoria agrees, but it causes major difficulties at home when he informs Alix that she will not be accompanying him. It had always been her dream to visit India, and she is heartbroken at being left behind. The trip to India goes well, but Bertie is furious when he finds out from the newspapers that his mother has been created Empress of India while he was visiting; and he must face yet another scandal when Lord Aylesford announces that his wife Edith has been having an affair and he may be divorcing her. Lord Randolph Churchill offers to intervene in the case – the other party in the affair is his brother – if the Prince would also intervene with Lord Aylesford to stop a divorce. Bertie flatly refuses, leading Churchill to try to force the Prince's hand by first appealing to Alix, and then threatening to expose some of Bertie's past relationships.
| 8 | "The Royal Quadrille" | 20 May 1975 |
Bertie and Alix travel to Denmark, where he is joined by various other relatives, including Alix's brother King George of Greece ("Willy"), along with "Sasha" and "Minnie," now Tsar and Tsarina. Bertie warns Sasha about the potential danger of the repressive measures that he has undertaken in Russia, urging him to continue reforming Russia like his father. Minnie confides to Alix her fears for her family in the wake of the assassination of Sasha's father. Bringing a reluctant Alix along, Bertie visits his sister Vicky and her husband Fritz, the Crown Prince of Prussia, on his way home from Denmark. He finds Vicky greatly distressed about her son William, whom she knows will some day be Emperor and has fallen under the spell of Bismarck, whom she dislikes. When the British intervene to put down a mutiny in the Egyptian army, Bertie very much wants to join his regiment, but the Queen will not hear of it. Bertie continues his liaison with actress Lillie Langtry. Prime Minister Gladstone asks the Prince to serve on a Royal Commission on the state of housing for the working classes. Bertie tours some of the poorest districts and is appalled at the conditions he finds there. In 1887, Bertie takes part in his mother's Golden Jubilee celebrations, and the following year, is heartbroken that his brother-in-law Fritz has died of cancer after a short reign of ninety-nine days.
| 9 | "Scandal" | 27 May 1975 |
Bertie agrees to assist Lady Brooke to retrieve a letter she wrote to her one-time lover, Lord Charles Beresford. She is now terrified that Lady Beresford will take some action against her. Bertie somewhat high-handedly calls on Lady Beresford's lawyer and orders him to destroy it. The lawyer refuses but does agree to ask his client to. Bertie then calls on Lady Beresford with the same request. When Beresford hears of the Prince's action, he is angry, nearly hitting Bertie in a confrontation. Bertie is relieved that Beresford will soon be returning to his naval posting in the Mediterranean. Soon after, during a visit to Tranby Croft, Bertie finds himself embroiled in a gambling scandal when Lt. Col. Sir William Gordon Cumming is found cheating at baccarat, an illegal card game. The Prince and others try to settle the matter quietly, but Cumming sues to regain his good name and reputation, and the events become public. Bertie then gets news that Beresford and his wife intend to resurrect the Lady Brooke incident, threatening to disclose various aspects of Bertie's private life if Bertie does not apologise to them. Alix and Bertie encourage their eldest son, Prince Eddy, to find a suitable wife. An early choice is unable to convert from Catholicism. Although Eddy does eventually find someone, Princess May of Teck, he becomes ill and dies on 14 January 1892. In May 1893, Prince Eddy's younger brother Prince George, Duke of York proposes to May. She accepts, and they are married on 6 July 1893.
| 10 | "The Years of Waiting" | 3 June 1975 |
Bertie is annoyed when he is kept in the dark about the Jameson Raid in South Africa and discovers that his nephew, Kaiser Wilhelm II, found out about it before he did. Queen Victoria still refuses to let Bertie have any role in matters of State, so he reluctantly spends his time going to the races and playing host to visiting relations - this time, his nephew by marriage and his niece, Tsar Nicholas II and Tsarina Alexandra ("Nicky" and "Alicky") at Balmoral. In 1897, the King of Greece appeals to Alexandra for help against the invading Turks, but when Alix goes to the Queen, she finds that Victoria is more interested in the forthcoming Diamond Jubilee celebration; the event is recorded with a new invention which works by displaying a sequence of still photographs through a projector. Victoria is outraged that Gladstone's funeral is held at Westminster Abbey, and that Bertie and his son George acted as pallbearers. The Boer War is extremely unpopular on the European Continent and Bertie is the object of an assassination attempt by a teenage anarchist in Brussels. In early 1901, Bertie receives news from Osborne House that his mother is dying and is present, along with various other members of the family, including the Kaiser, when she dies at the age of 81.
| 11 | "King at Last" | 10 June 1975 |
After a wait of nearly 60 years, Bertie becomes King upon the death of his mother Queen Victoria, and announces that contrary to the wishes of his parents, who wished him to reign as King Albert Edward, he will reign as King Edward VII. There is much speculation as to whether he is up to the job. The King's nephew, Kaiser Wilhelm II, proposes an Anglo-German alliance and the King supports it, but several of his ministers simply do not take him seriously. Although now Queen, Alix is having trouble adjusting to their new life, refusing to live at Buckingham Palace and reluctant to leave Marlborough House, the home designated for the Prince of Wales, their son George. The King's sister, Vicky – the Kaiser's mother – is dying of cancer and soon after his ascent to the throne, Bertie travels to Germany to see her; at Vicky's request, the King's secretary, Ponsonby, manages to smuggle her letters out of Germany. The King is frustrated when his coronation is postponed due to the Boer War. When it is finally scheduled, it must be postponed again as the King has to undergo emergency surgery to remove his appendix just two days before the ceremony; the planned festivities for the populace proceed regardless. Finally, in a more modest ceremony on 9 August 1902, Bertie and Alix are crowned.
| 12 | "The Peacemaker" | 17 June 1975 |
The King grows increasingly frustrated with his limited role as a constitutional monarch. His attempt at engineering a grand alliance with Germany is successful at one level but ultimately rejected by the Government, which still sees the King as someone not to be taken seriously. Still searching for some way to make an impact, the King announces he will soon go on a Grand Tour of several European nations including Britain's historic enemy, France. His arrival in France is marked by boos and catcalls following the end of the Boer War, but he soon charms the people and leaves to great cheers. His nephew Willie, the German Emperor, continues to visit England but has become pompous to the point that the King can barely stand being in the same room as him. After the failure to agree an Anglo-German alliance, Germany begins to expand its army and navy.
| 13 | "Good Old Teddy!" | 1 July 1975 |
The King enters his final years in ill health. He smokes too much and has put on too much weight. Britain concludes the Triple Entente, a pact with France and Russia, but is aware that the German Kaiser will inevitably see it as an affront to Germany. Willie still visits his uncle and appears sincere in his love of family and of Britain. His on-going re-armament of the German army and navy is clearly seen as a threat against the United Kingdom. As a counterbalance the King and Queen set off on a trip to Russia to visit her nephew, the Tsar. Having to yet again try to improve relations with Willie, the King visits Germany but this takes a serious toll on his health. Domestically, the King is thrust into a constitutional crisis when the House of Lords refuses to pass a budget approved by the House of Commons. He returns to London from France. The King's bronchitis worsens, and he dies on 6 May 1910.

== Soundtrack ==
- "The Daring Young Man on the Flying Trapeze"
- "Champagne Charlie"
- "The Boy I Love Is Up in the Gallery" (Episode 10)
- "A Wand'ring Minstrel I" (Episode 12)
