= Love Is War =

Love Is War may refer to:

- Love Is War (album), a 2006 album by Vanilla Ninja
- Love Is War (1970 film), a 1970 Norwegian film
- Love Is War (2019 film), a Nigerian film
- "Love Is War", a 2007 song by Scorpions from Humanity: Hour I
- "Love Is War", a 2008 song by Supercell from their debut album Supercell
- "Love Is War", a 2010 song by Joe McElderry from Wide Awake
- "Love Is War", a 2013 song by American Young
- Kaguya-sama: Love Is War, a Japanese manga and anime series

== See also ==
- In Love and War (disambiguation)
- Love and War (disambiguation)
- War is peace
