= Tormé =

- Origin: England
- Genres: Glam metal Hard rock Glam punk
- Years active: 1985–1987; 1993
- Past members: Bernie Tormé; Phil Lewis; Chris Heilman; Ian Whitewood; Chris Jones; John Pearce; Gary Owen

Tormé were a band featuring Irish guitarist Bernie Tormé, whom the band was named after. Tormé's singer was Phil Lewis, who had previously been in the bands Girl and New Torpedoes, and who is now in L.A. Guns. The band also featured bassist Chris Heilman, who later played for Shark Island, and drummer Ian Whitewood.

Tormé recorded the albums Back To Babylon and Die Pretty, Die Young. The band recorded a song titled "Sex Action" on their album Die Pretty, Die Young, but it is not the same song that L.A. Guns later recorded on their self-titled album.

A later line-up of Bernie Tormé, Gary Owen (ex guest vocalist for Samson), John Pearce and Chris Jones, recorded the album Demolition Ball for the Bleeding Hearts label in 1993.

== Members ==
- Bernie Tormé - guitars (1985–1994)
- Phil Lewis - vocals (1985–1987)
- Chris Heilman - bass (1985–1987)
- Ian Whitewood - drums (1985–1987)
- Gary Owen - vocals (1992–1994)
- John Pearce - bass (1992–1994)
- Chris Jones - drums (1992–1994)

== Discography ==
- Back To Babylon (1985)
- So You Wanna Be A Star (1986, EP)
- Die Pretty, Die Young (1987)
- Official Bootleg (1987, live album)
- Demolition Ball (1993)
- Tormé: The Bernie Tormé Archives Vol 2 - 1985-1993 (2024)
