= Jerzee Monét =

American singer (born 1977)

- Born: Tanisha Monét Carey; June 9, 1977 (age 48)
- Origin: Trenton, New Jersey, U.S.
- Genres: R&B, soul
- Occupations: Singer, songwriter
- Years active: 2001–present
- Label: DreamWorks

Tanisha Monét Carey (born June 9, 1977), known professionally as Jerzee Monét, is an American R&B singer formerly signed to DreamWorks Records.

== Early life ==
Jerzee's parents are divorced. Her mom is a Jehovah Witness and her cousins are Muslims. She previously worked as a hairstylist and a chef before releasing her debut album.

== Career ==
While working as a chef Ruff Ryders came to eat where she worked. She and DMX exchanged phone numbers and he encouraged her to pursue her dreams. She later signed a record deal with DreamWorks Records and started creating her debut project entitled Love & War. In 2002, Jerzee released her debut single entitled "Most High" featuring DMX. She released her second single "Work It Out," which did not chart. She released her debut album "Love & War" which peaked at 60 on Billboard 200 and at 14 on Top R&B/Hip-Hop Albums charts.

== Discography ==
=== Studio albums ===
List of studio albums, with selected chart positions
Title	Album details	Peak chart positions	
Title	Album details	US	US R&B
Love & War	Released: July 16, 2002; Label: DreamWorks Records; Formats: CD, Digital download	60	14
