= Shirley Steedman =

British actress (born 1949)

Shirley Patricia Steedman (born 1949) is a Scottish actress, best known for her role as Monica in The Prime of Miss Jean Brodie (1969). She also played Princess Alice in Edward the Seventh (1975), and her mother Queen Victoria in a 1976 television adaptation of East Lynne.

She also appeared in other TV movies including Jane Eyre (1970), Jonah and the Whale (1975) and A Man Called Intrepid (1979), as well as TV comedies including an episode of On The Buses – "The New Telly" and an episode of Open All Hours as Granville's friend Maureen. In 1973 she appeared in an episode of Whatever Happened to the Likely Lads entitled 'Birthday Boy' playing Deborah. She later appeared as Rose Parrish in the 1979 TV series Penmarric.
