= Love and War (Iraqi TV series) =

- Genre: series
- Directed by: Jamal Abed jassim .
- Starring: Qasim Al-Malak . Naghem Alsultany . Mais Gomar .
- Country of origin: Iraq
- Original language: Arabic

Production
- Production locations: Baghdad, Iraq

Original release
- Release: 2003

Love and War (Arabic:حب و حرب) is an Iraqi TV series directed by Jamal Abed jassim and starring Iraqi actors Qasim Al-malak and Naghem Alsultany
