= Stop the War Committee =

Anti-war organization opposing the Second Boer War

- Founded: 1899
- Founder: William Thomas Stead
- President: John Clifford

The Stop the War Committee was an anti-war organisation that opposed the Second Boer War. It was formed by William Thomas Stead in 1899. Its president was John Clifford and prominent members included Lloyd George and Keir Hardie. The group was generally seen as pro-Boer.

Against the background of political campaigning for the khaki election of 1900, Stop-The-War distributed millions of posters, cartoons and broadsheets, handing out leaflets to commuters on trains.

Its resolutions were religiously-inspired and utopian in their approach. The Committee united various Nonconformists who held different views in relation to socialism. However, the high moral tone of its pronouncements failed to achieve support from the working class, and provoked stronger antagonism than the more rational approach of the South African Conciliation Committee.

== See also ==
- Anti-war
- Opposition to the Second Boer War
- List of anti-war organizations
- List of peace activists
