= XI: The Days Before Tomorrow =

Studio album by Lillian Axe
- Released: January 27, 2012 (Europe); February 14, 2012 (USA)
- Studio: Sound Landing Studios, Covington, Louisiana
- Genre: Heavy metal, hard rock
- Length: 59:38
- Label: AFM (Europe); CME Records (USA)
- Producer: Steve Blaze

Lillian Axe chronology
| Deep Red Shadows (2010) | XI: The Days Before Tomorrow (2012) |

XI: The Days Before Tomorrow is an album by American rock band Lillian Axe, released in 2012. It is the first album to feature lead vocalist Brian Jones. A free concert and album release party was hosted on February 4, 2012, at the Howlin' Wolf, a popular music venue in New Orleans. A departure from earlier albums, the album features piano and features numerous acoustic guitar parts.

== Track listing ==
All songs by Steve Blaze, except "The Great Divide" by Blaze and Rob Hovey

1. "Babylon" – 5:41
2. "Death Comes Tomorrow" – 5:50
3. "Gather Up the Snow" – 4:55
4. "The Great Divide" – 6:26
5. "Take the Bullet" – 3:23
6. "Bow Your Head" – 5:03
7. "Caged In" – 4:41
8. "Soul Disease" – 4:15
9. "Lava on My Tongue" – 5:33
10. "My Apologies" – 4:46
11. "Angels Among Us" (European bonus track) – 4:06
12. "You Belong to Me" (hidden bonus track) – 4:59

== Personnel ==
- Brian C. Jones – lead vocals
- Steve Blaze – lead guitar, backing vocals, keyboards
- Sam Poitevent – rhythm guitar, backing vocals, keyboards
- Eric Morris – bass guitar
- Rob Hovey – drums #1, 4, 6, 10
- Ken Koudelka – drums
