= Prometheus: The Life of Balzac =

1975 British television series

- Genre: Drama
- Based on: Prometheus: The Life of Balzac by André Maurois
- Written by: David Turner
- Directed by: Joan Craft
- Starring: Nicky Henson; Helen Ryan; Rosemary McHale; Elizabeth Spriggs; Nanette Newman; William Squire; Tim Woodward
- Country of origin: United Kingdom
- No. of series: 1
- No. of episodes: 6

Production
- Producer: Richard Beynon
- Running time: 50 minutes
- Production company: BBC

Original release
- Network: BBC2
- Release: 20 October – 24 November 1975

Prometheus: The Life of Balzac is a 1975 six-part television mini-series adaptation of André Maurois' 1965 book of the same name. It was produced by the BBC and all six episodes were broadcast in colour from 20 October 1975 to 24 November 1975 on BBC Two. With Nicky Henson playing the main character Honore de Balzac, the series shows his life from wanting to be a writer to falling in love.

== Plot ==
Set in the mid-1800s in France, a renowned French novelist named Honore de Balzac tries to become a great writer with the help of his family, but he ends up facing ambitions, relationships, and struggles as he tries to reach that goal. He eventually embraces instead and decides to find the first great love of his life instead. His friends and poet writer Victor Hugo all encourage him to do it.

== Cast ==
The cast and so forth are as follows:

=== Main cast ===
- Nicky Henson as Honoré de Balzac
- Helen Ryan as Madame Balzac
- Rosemary McHale as Laure Balzac, Laure Surville
- Elizabeth Spriggs as Comtesse de Berny
- Nanette Newman as Countess Eve Hanska
- William Squire as Monsieur Balzac
- Tim Woodward as Tim Woodward

=== Supporting cast ===
- Stephanie Beacham as Fanny Lovell
- Mary Morris as Aunt Rosalie
- Leslie French as Pere Dablin
- Antonia Pemberton as Louise Breugnol
- Roger Hammond as Conte Guidoboni-Visconti
- Alan Curtis as Commandant Carraud
- Freddie Earlle as Agent
- Christopher Banks as Doctor Knothe
- Leon Vitali as Jules Sandeau
- Moira Redmond as Duchesse d'Abrantes
- Genevieve Allenbury as Zanella
- Preston Lockwood as Count Hanska
- Phoebe Nicholls as Augustine de Berny
- Kate Lock as Jeanne de Berny
- Peter Sallis as Victor Hugo
- Tracey Childs as Victorine de Berny
- Zara Nutley as Madame du Bordello
- Jeremy Clyde as Raisson
- Jill Gascoine as Helene de Valette
- Paul Darrow as Cador

== Episodes ==
The series aired on BBC Two on Mondays at around 9:00pm. After all six episodes had finished being broadcast, the series was never rebroadcast on television after its internal 1975 run.

No.	Title	Original release date
1	"Apprenticeship of a Genius"	20 October 1975
2	"The Road to Fame"	27 October 1975
3	"Man and Woman"	3 November 1975
4	"Lost Illusions"	10 November 1975
5	"The Human Comedy"	17 November 1975
6	"The Race to Death"	24 November 1975

== Production ==
All six episodes of the series were filmed at the BBC television studio Pebble Mill Studios in 1974.

== Reception ==
All six episodes exist in the BBC Archives, although none of the episodes have been released on DVD. The entire series is available to watch at the British Film Institute and the series is also held in the Kaleidoscope archives as well.
