= Back to Babylon (album) =

Studio album by Tormé
- Released: 1985
- Genre: Glam metal
- Label: Zebra Records
- Producer: John McCoy

Tormé chronology
Back to Babylon (1985)	Die Pretty, Die Young (1987)

Professional ratings
Review scores
Source	Rating
Kerrang!	3/5 stars

Back to Babylon is the first album by the band Tormé and was released in 1985. The cover was designed by Lisa Valder. It was re-issued on CD by Metal Blade Records in 1989 with "Love, Guns And Money" added. In 2004 it was re-issued again on Lemon Recordings with three bonus tracks: "T.V.O.D.", "Kerrap" and "Love, Guns And Money".

== Track listing ==
All tracks composed by Bernie Tormé; except where indicated

=== Side one ===
1. "All Around The World" (Tormé, Heilman, Whitewood, Lewis) - 3:52
2. "Star" - 4:35
3. "Eyes of the World" - 4:39
4. "Burning Bridges" - 2:15
5. "Hardcore" (Tormé, Heilman, Whitewood, Lewis) - 3:17
6. "Here I Go" - 2:30

=== Side two ===
1. "Family At War" (Phil Lewis, Pete Bonus) (Girl cover) - 4:56
2. "Front Line" - 5:34
3. "Arabia" - 4:59
4. "Mystery Train" - 5:52

== 2004 CD release ==
For the 2004 CD release three tracks from the 1986 "So You Wanna Be A Star" EP were added.

1. "All Around The World" (Tormé, Heilman, Whitewood, Lewis) - 3:52
2. "Star" - 4:35
3. "Eyes of the World" - 4:39
4. "Burning Bridges" - 2:15
5. "Hardcore" (Tormé, Heilman, Whitewood, Lewis) - 3:17
6. "Here I Go" - 2:30
7. "Family At War" (Phil Lewis, Pete Bonus) (Girl cover) - 4:56
8. "Front Line" - 5:34
9. "Arabia" - 4:59
10. "Mystery Train" - 5:52
11. "T.V.O.D." (Heilman) - 1:58
12. "Kerrap" - 1:12
13. "Love, Guns, and Money" - 3:00

== Personnel ==
- Phil Lewis - lead vocals
- Bernie Tormé - guitar
- Chris Heilman - bass
- Ian Whitewood - drums
- Special guest - Colin Towns - keyboards
- Joff (Jon) McKellow - Saxophone (Burning Bridges)
- Ray Colquhoun - Trumpet (Burning Bridges)
