= El Niño/More Purple than Black =

El Niño/More Purple Than Black

Studio album by Phil Lewis
- Genre: Sleaze rock

El Niño and More Purple Than Black are two names for the same Phil Lewis solo album.

== Track listing ==
1. "No Sell Out"
2. "How Low Can You Go"
3. "Access Denied"
4. "Close Your Eyes"
5. "Not What You Take"
6. "I Don't Think So"
7. "Could Not Live Without You"
8. "Tuesday"
9. "Trust"
10. "Slave To Now"
11. "Just Got Back"
12. "I Stand Accused"
13. "Old Flames"
14. "Carrying On"
15. "Not What You Take" (Acoustic Mix)
16. "Trust" (Acoustic Mix)
17. "I Stand Accused" (Acoustic Mix)
