= Die Pretty, Die Young =

Studio album by Tormé
- Released: 1987
- Recorded: 1986–1987
- Genre: Glam metal

Tormé chronology
Back to Babylon (1985)	Die Pretty, Die Young (1987)

Die Pretty, Die Young is the second album by the band Tormé, which was released in 1987 and recorded in 1986–87.

Shortly after this album, singer Phil Lewis joined the band L.A. Guns.

== Track listing ==
1. "Let It Rock"
2. "The Real Thing"
3. "Ready"
4. "Sex Action"
5. "The Ways of the East"
6. "Killer"
7. "Memphis"
8. "Louise"
9. "Crimes of Passion"
10. "Ghost Train"

(Note: The song "Sex Action" on this album is not the same song as the song of the same name on L.A. Guns's self-titled album.)

== Personnel ==
- Phil Lewis - lead vocals
- Bernie Tormé - guitar
- Chris Heilman - bass
- Ian Whitewood - drums
