= Liberators (American band) =

- Origin: United States
- Genre: Glam metal
- Past members: Phil Lewis; Brent Muscat; John Juster; Dave Moreno; Adam Curry; Eric Stacy

The Liberators were a band featuring singer Phil Lewis, guitarist Brent Muscat, keyboardist John Juster, bassist Adam Curry (and later Eric Stacy), and drummer Dave Moreno.

- Phil Lewis and Brent Muscat also played together in L.A. Guns.
- Brent Muscat and Eric Stacy also played together in Faster Pussycat and Bubble.
- Eric Stacy and Dave Moreno also played together in Supercool.

The band released an album titled Access Denied. Some copies are sold as a Phil Lewis "solo" album. Both versions have their own album cover.

This band should not be confused with the British band called the Liberators that featured former Judas Priest drummer Dave Holland.

== Access Denied (2000) ==
Access Denied

Studio album by Liberators
- Released: 2000

Phil Lewis cover

=== Track listing ===
1. "Over the Edge" (L.A. Guns cover)
2. "Little Dove" (Faster Pussycat cover)
3. "Long Time Dead" (L.A. Guns cover)
4. "Rock N Roll Hootchie Koo" (Johnny Winter and Rick Derringer cover)
5. "How Low Can You Go"
6. "Sex Action" (L.A. Guns cover)
7. "Access Denied"
8. "My Number" (live) (Girl cover)
9. "I Don't Think So" (live)
10. "Trust God" (live)
