= Phil Lewis (musician) =

British singer

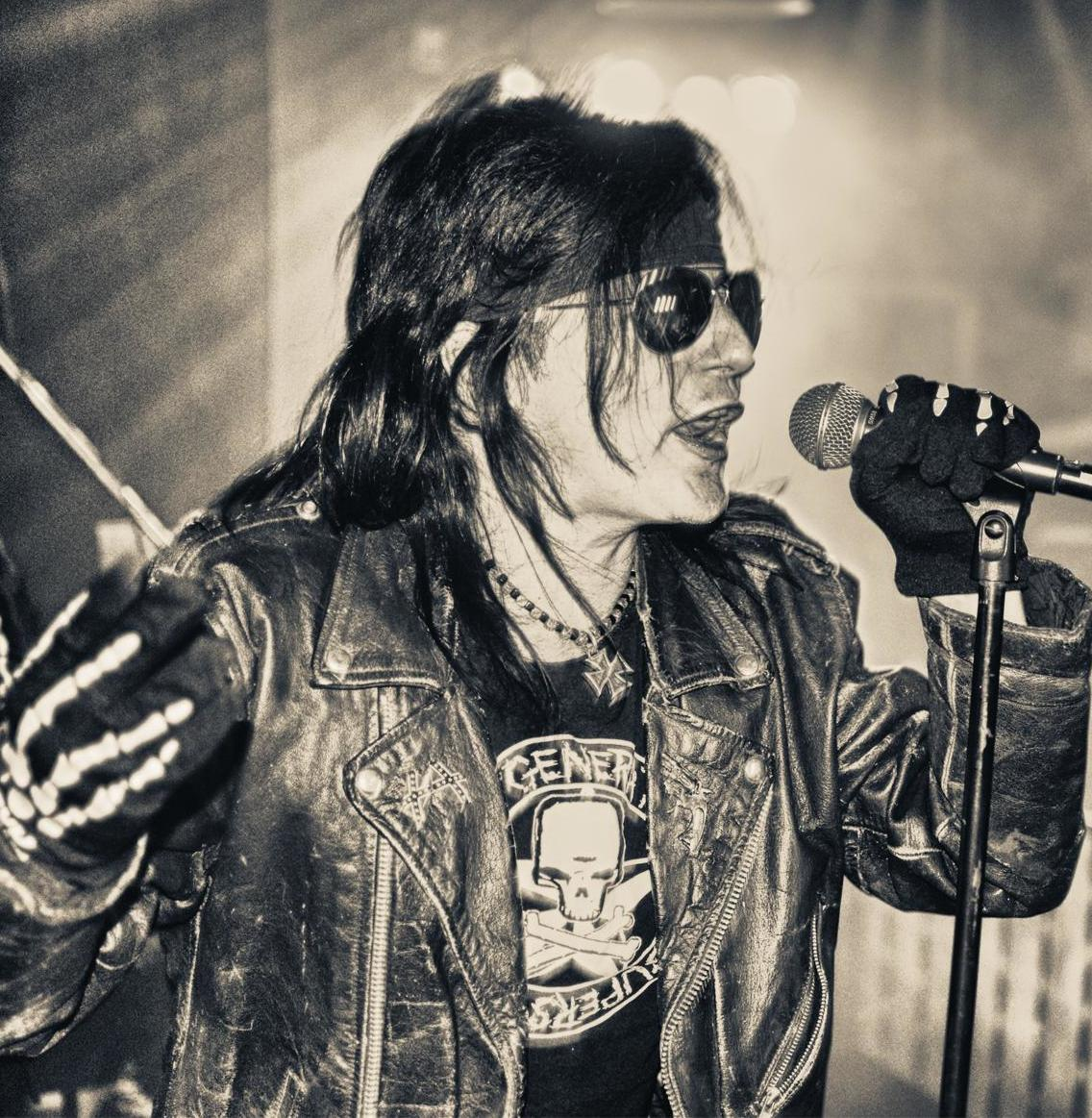
- Lewis performing with L.A. Guns in 2010

Background information
- Born: Philip Francis Lewis; 9 January 1957 (age 69); London, England
- Genres: Glam metal; hard rock
- Occupations: Singer; musician; songwriter
- Instruments: Vocals; guitar
- Years active: 1978–present
- Member of: L.A. Guns
- Formerly of: New Torpedos; Tormé; Girl; Liberators; Filthy Lucre

Philip Francis Lewis (born 9 January 1957) is an English musician who has lived and worked in the U.S. since the 1980s. He is best known as the lead vocalist and occasional rhythm guitarist for the American glam metal band L.A. Guns.

== Early life ==
Philip Francis Lewis was born in London on 9 January 1957. He was privately educated at Royal Russell School in Surrey.

== Early work ==
Lewis started the band Girl with guitarist Gerry Laffy in 1978. They put an advertisement in Melody Maker for a "peroxide guitar hero," and Phil Collen (current guitarist of Def Leppard) answered. They were soon joined by drummer Dave Gaynor and bassist Mark Megary. Megary was replaced shortly thereafter by Laffy's brother, Simon Laffy. They signed a record deal with Don Arden's label, Jet Records in 1979 and released their first album, Sheer Greed, in 1980. Lewis' then-girlfriend, Britt Ekland, was instrumental in helping Girl land their record deal. Later band members included Pete Barnacle, Bryson Graham, and Pete Bonas. They released their second album, Wasted Youth in 1982. Phil Collen left the band in 1982 to join Def Leppard, and the band broke up shortly thereafter. Their third and final album, Killing Time, was released in 1997. It consisted of leftover material from the first two albums as well as tracks that were written for an album that never materialized.

Lewis later joined forces with guitarist Rudy Rivera, bassist Dave Birch, and drummer Paul Edwards to start the band New Torpedos. They released a demo tape.

Lewis left New Torpedos to join the band Tormé with guitarist Bernie Tormé. They signed a record deal with Zebra Records and released Back to Babylon in 1985 and Die Pretty, Die Young in 1987. They toured both albums with modest success but never quite managed to win over mainstream audiences.

== L.A. Guns ==
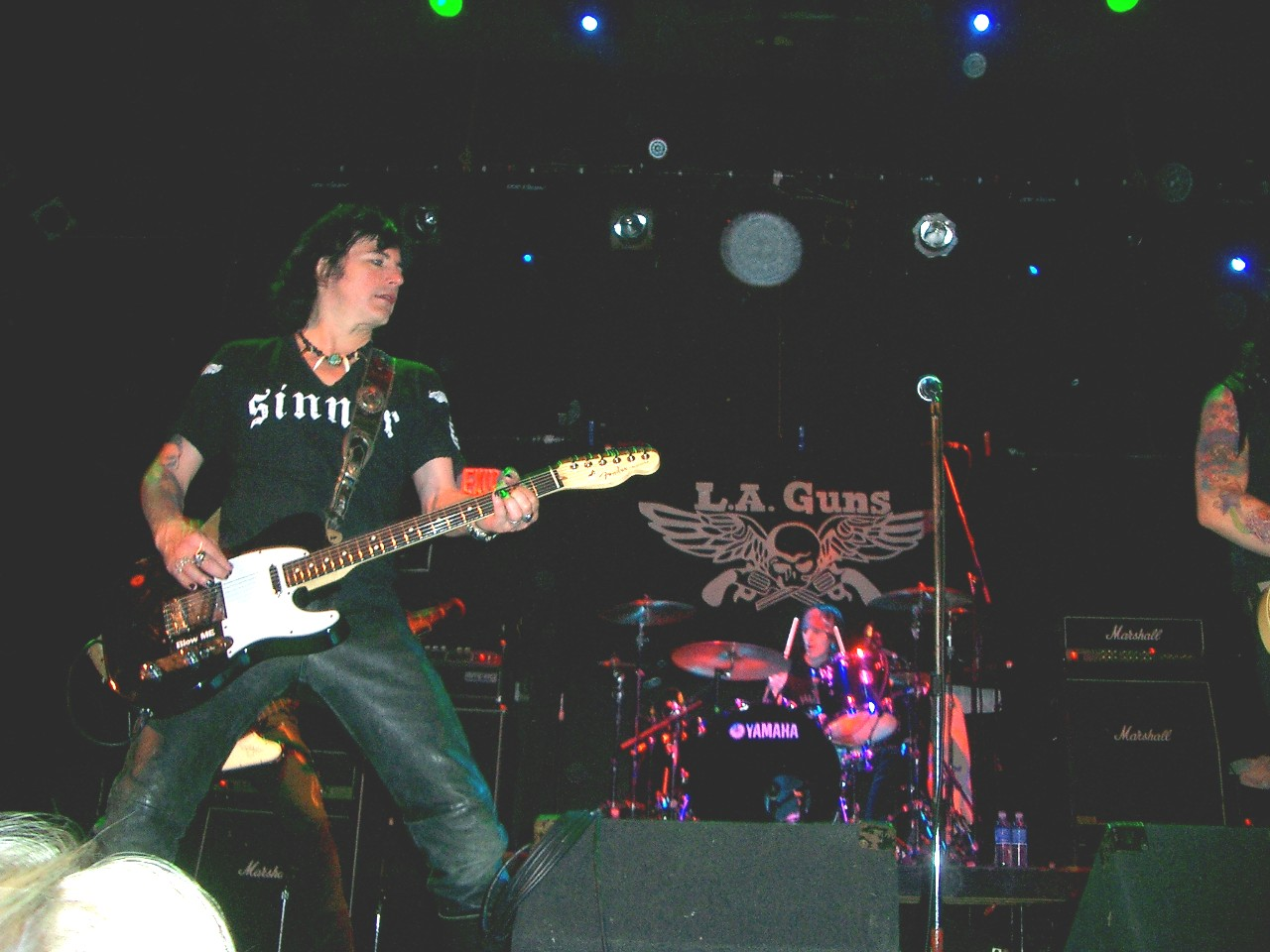
Lewis with Steve Riley and L.A. Guns. The Chance Theater, Poughkeepsie, New York. March 2008.

Shortly after leaving Tormé, Lewis received a call from guitarist Tracii Guns stating that he was interested in having Phil join his band, L.A. Guns. The two met on 1 April 1987, and Lewis was hired shortly thereafter. L.A. Guns soon signed a record deal with Polygram Records and released their first album, L.A. Guns, on 4 January 1988. The band achieved mainstream success with their second album, Cocked & Loaded, thanks in part due to the successful single, "The Ballad of Jayne." They released Hollywood Vampires in 1991, which also had moderate success. Due to the rise in popularity of the grunge movement, the band would not release their fourth album, Vicious Circle until 1994. That album did not achieve the success of the prior albums, so Lewis left the band shortly after its release.

During his time out of L.A. Guns, Lewis participated in several other music projects including Filthy Lucre with Steve Dior and the Liberators. Filthy Lucre released an album called Popsmear in 1997. During this time, he also held various other jobs including producing albums for other artists, mixing audio for Fox Sports, and even working as a telephone psychic for a short time.

Lewis returned to L.A. Guns in 1999. The classic lineup released a re-recorded version of the hit album Cocked and Loaded in 2000. This updated version was called Cocked & Re-Loaded. The band released a new album entitled Man in the Moon in 2001. They released Waking The Dead in April 2002. It was the first album with producer Andy Johns and would also prove to be the last with Tracii Guns, as he left the band a few months later to team up with Nikki Sixx for the band Brides of Destruction. Guns' departure forced the band to pull out of a world tour with Alice Cooper, and they were soon dropped from their label as well.

Lewis and drummer Steve Riley continued to tour as L.A. Guns after Tracii Guns' departure and have released two more original albums, Tales from the Strip in 2005 and Hollywood Forever in 2012.

In December 2016, Lewis announced that he would be leaving the current lineup of L.A. Guns. He also announced that he will be joining Tracii Guns in a new L.A. Guns lineup. The new lineup consists of Phil Lewis, Tracii Guns, Michael Grant, Johnny Martin, and Shane Fitzgibbon. They released a new album together called "The Missing Peace" on 13 October 2017. As of March 2018, Michael Grant left L.A. Guns.

Lewis is a contributor to the 80s metal music website "Metal Sludge", under the online handle "Al Snug".

== Tribute albums ==
Lewis sang on a cover of Def Leppard's "Bringin' On the Heartbreak" on the Def Leppard tribute album Leppardmania. He also sang on a cover of Guns N' Roses's "My Michelle" on the Guns N' Roses tribute album Appetite for Reconstruction, and he contributed vocals on "Shot Down In Flames" for the AC/DC tribute album We Salute You: an All Star Tribute To AC/DC.

Lewis recorded a cover of Kiss' "Strutter" on the Kiss tribute album Spin The Bottle, sang on "Billion Dollar Babies" on the Alice Cooper tribute Humanary Stew, and contributed vocals to a cover of Bon Jovi's "Wanted Dead or Alive" on the Bon Jovi tribute album Covered Dead or Alive.

== Discography ==
With Girl

- Sheer Greed (1980)
- Wasted Youth (1982)
- Killing Time (1997)

With New Torpedos

- New Torpedos demo tape

With Tormé

- Back To Babylon (1985)
- Die Pretty, Die Young (1987)

With L.A. Guns

- L.A. Guns (1988)
- Cocked & Loaded (1989)
- Hollywood Vampires (1991)
- Cuts (1992)
- Vicious Circle (1994)
- Greatest Hits and Black Beauties (1999)
- Live: A Night on the Strip (2000)
- Cocked & Re-Loaded (2000)
- Man in the Moon (2001)
- Waking the Dead (2002)
- Rips the Covers Off (2004)
- Tales from the Strip (2005)
- Loud and Dangerous: Live from Hollywood (2006)
- Hellraiser's Ball: Caught in the Act (2008)
- Covered in Guns (2010)
- Hollywood Forever (2012)
- The Missing Peace (2017)
- The Devil You Know (2019)
- Checkered Past (2021)
- Black Diamonds (2023)
- Leopard Skin (2025)

With Filthy Lucre

- Popsmear (1997)

Solo

- El Niño/More Purple than Black (1999)
- Access Denied (2000) – also marketed as a Liberators album
- Gypsy: Phil Lewis Semi-Precious Jewels (2007)

With The Liberators

- Access Denied (2000) – also marketed as a Phil Lewis solo album

Guest vocal appearances

- Sheer Greed – song "Everybody Wants" on their 1992 album Sublime to the Ridiculous

== Filmography ==
- Witchmaster General (2008) – plays Dr. Phineas Gorgon
- Melrose Place (1992-1999) – season 1, episode 4 "For Love or Money" – Himself, Art Collector
