= Mais Gomar =

Iraqi TV actress (born 1978)

- ميس كمر
- Born: Mais Gomar Abd Jassim; 2 July 1978 (age 47); Baghdad, Iraq
- Occupation: Actress
- Spouse: Hamza Hadi Muhsin
- Children: 1

Mais Gomar (Arabic: ميس كمر; born 2 July 1978) is an Iraqi TV actress.

== Early life ==
Mais Gomar Abd Jassim was born in Baghdad, Iraq. One of her most important serials is Al hkomat(The Governments) in 2007 which presented Al Sharqiya, and resulted in her fame in Iraq.

== TV serials ==
- Hob wa Harb (Love and War) 2004
- Al Hkomat (The Governments) 2007
- Nojjom Al dohr (The stars of the afternoon) 2008
- Akbar kadab 1 (The biggest liar part 1) 2012
- Abou Al malaien (The millions' owner) 2013
