= Poetic Justice (Lillian Axe album) =

Studio album by Lillian Axe
- Released: January 14, 1992
- Genre: Glam metal
- Length: 49:51
- Label: I.R.S. / Grand Slamm
- Producer: Leif Mases

Lillian Axe chronology
(1987–1989) Out of the Darkness – Into the Light (1991)	Poetic Justice (1992)	Psychoschizophrenia (1993)

Professional ratings
Review scores
Source	Rating
AllMusic	3/5 stars
Chicago Tribune	3.5/4 stars

Poetic Justice is a studio album by the American glam metal band Lillian Axe, released in 1992. It was the first featuring drummer Gene Barnett and bassist Darrin DeLatte; they replaced Danny King and Rob Stratton. It was also the band's first release on I.R.S. Records, after being dropped by MCA Records.

It was recorded at Sheffield Audio-Video Productions in Phoenix, Maryland, and The Terminal in Jackson, Mississippi.

It peaked at No. 28 on Billboard's Top Heatseekers chart.

== Track listing ==
All songs by Steve Blaze, except where indicated.

1. "Poetic Justice" – 0:39
2. "Innocence" (Blaze, Jon Ster, Ron Taylor) – 4:57
3. "True Believer" – 4:27
4. "Body Double" (Blaze, Ster, Taylor) – 4:44
5. "See You Someday" – 5:27
6. "Living in the Grey" (Blaze, Taylor) – 5:15
7. "Digital Dreams" – 0:50
8. "Dyin' to Live" – 4:25
9. "Mercy" – 4:14
10. "The Promised Land" – 4:19
11. "No Matter What" (Pete Ham) – 3:18 (Badfinger cover)
12. "She's My Salvation" – 5:30
13. "A Moment of Reflection" – 1:47

== Personnel ==
- Ron Taylor – lead vocals
- Steve Blaze – lead guitar, backing vocals, keyboards
- Jon Ster – rhythm guitar, backing vocals, keyboards
- Darrin DeLatte – bass guitar
- Gene Barnett – drums
