= John Lindsay (New Zealand cricketer) =

New Zealand cricketer (born 1957)

Personal information
- Full name: John Kenneth Lindsay
- Born: 2 April 1957 (age 69); Winton, Southland, New Zealand
- Batting: Right-handed
- Bowling: Right-arm off break

Domestic team information
- Years: Team
- 1975/76–1991/92: Southland
- 1980/81–1991/92: Otago
- FC debut: 27 December 1980 Otago v Wellington
- Last FC: 21 January 1992 Otago v Wellington
- LA debut: 30 December 1980 Otago v Wellington
- Last LA: 3 January 1989 Otago v Canterbury

Career statistics
| Competition | First-class | List A |
|---|---|---|
| Matches | 44 | 8 |
| Runs scored | 857 | 82 |
| Batting average | 14.77 | 20.50 |
| 100s/50s | 0/2 | 0/0 |
| Top score | 65* | 35* |
| Balls bowled | 5,483 | 198 |
| Wickets | 75 | 5 |
| Bowling average | 40.52 | 28.20 |
| 5 wickets in innings | 3 | 0 |
| 10 wickets in match | 1 | 0 |
| Best bowling | 5/48 | 3/21 |
| Catches/stumpings | 20/– | 5/– |
- Source: ESPNcricinfo, 15 May 2016

John Kenneth Lindsay (born 2 April 1957) is a New Zealand former cricketer. He played 44 first-class and eight List A matches for Otago between the 1980–81 and 1991–92 seasons.

Lindsay was born at Winton in Southland in 1957. He played for Otago age-group teams from the 1974–75 season and made his Hawke Cup debut for Southland the following season. His senior representative debut for Otago came against Wellington at Molyneux Park in Alexandra in December 1980. Primarily an off break bowler, Lindsay took a single wicket on debut, going on to take 75 first-class and five List A wickets in a career that lasted until the end of the 1991–92 season.

Two of his three five-wicket hauls came during the final Plunket Shield match of the 1987–88 season as Otago defeated Wellington at the Basin Reserve to win the Shield. Lindsay took five wickets for 110 runs (5/110) in Wellington's first innings and 5/48 in the second in a match which the Otago Daily Times named as one of the greatest moments in Otago sport in 2011.
