= Love & War (Jerzee Monét album) =

Studio album by Jerzee Monét
- Released: July 16, 2002
- Recorded: 2001–2002
- Genre: R&B; soul
- Length: 42:53
- Label: DreamWorks
- Producer: John McClain (Ex), Tyric Jones, Nakia Shine

Professional ratings
Review scores
Source	Rating
Allmusic	link

Love & War is the only studio album by American singer Jerzee Monét. It was released on July 16, 2002 through DreamWorks Records. The album debuted at number sixty on the US Billboard 200 and number fourth-teen on the Top R&B/Hip-Hop Albums chart in 2002. The album was produced by Tyric Jones, also DMX, Eve and Ja Rule made appearances as well.

== Background ==
On July 16, 2002 Jerzee Monét debut album Love & War was released. The album debuted at number 60 on the US Billboard 200, number 14 on the Top R&B/Hip-Hop Albums chart and number 60 on Top Albums Sales. It stayed on the Billboard 200 chart for five weeks and on the Hip-Hop/R&B album chart for nine consecutive weeks.

== Singles ==
The album lead single "Most High" peaked at 54 on Top R&B/Hip-Hop songs, 25 on Adult R&B and 54 on R&B/Hip-Hop Airplay chart.

The second single from the album, "Work It Out" didn't get to make it on the charts.

== Track listing ==
No.	Title	Producer(s)	Length
1.	"Most High"	Tyric Jones	3:40
2.	"Respect"	Tyric Jones	3:34
3.	"Work It Out"	Tyric Jones	3:42
4.	"Tonight Is The Night"	Tyric Jones	3:19
5.	"Yeah" (featuring Eve)	Tyric Jones	3:45
6.	"Stop My Flow"	Tyric Jones	3:43
7.	"Twisted" (featuring Ja Rule)	Jerry Stokes	3:33
8.	"Better Than That"	Tyric Jones	3:01
9.	"Missing You"	Dre Day, Nakia Shine	4:32
10.	"Set It Off"		3:28
11.	"Love & War"		3:16
12.	"One of Those Days"	Tyric Jones, Blaze Billions	3:41
13.	"Most High (Bonus Track)" (featuring DMX)		2:18

== Samples ==
- "Most High"
  - "Kissing My Love" by Bill Withers
- "Respect"
  - "You're Getting A Little Too Smart" by Detroit Emeralds
- "Better Than That"
  - "All 4 The Ca$h" by Gang Starr

== Credits and personnel ==
Credits adapted from the liner notes of Love & War and AllMusic:

Management

- DreamWorks Records
- SKG Music L. L. C.

Recording locations

- N Key Studios, (Dayton, OH)
- Streetlight Studios (New York City)

Credits

- Jerzee Monét – primary artist
- Eve – featured artist, primary artist
- Brian Garder – mastering
- Ja Rule – featured artist, guest artist, performer, primary Artist
- Tyric Jones – engineer, mixing, mixing engineer, multi instruments, producer, programming
- Makeda Davis – composer
- George Karras – engineer
- Allison Martinello – a&r
- John McClain – executive producer
- Dave Pensado – mixing
- Nakia Shine – producer
- Tom Soares – engineer, mixing, mixing engineer
- Andrew Stephens – programming
- Robert White – a&r
- DMX – featured artist, guest artist
- Kwaku Alston – photography

== Charts ==
Chart (2002)	Peak position
US Billboard 200	60
US Top Album Sales (Billboard)	60
US Top R&B/Hip-Hop Albums (Billboard)	14
