= In Love and War =

In Love and War may refer to:

== Film and television ==
- In Love and War (1958 film), a film based on a novel by Anton Myrer
- In Love and War (TV series), a 1981 Hong Kong TV series also known as Fung Fo Fei Fa
- In Love and War (1987 film), a made-for-television film featuring James Woods and Jane Alexander
- In Love and War (1996 film), a film based on a book about Ernest Hemingway during World War I
- In Love and War (2001 film), a Hallmark Hall of Fame made-for-television film starring Callum Blue as Eric Newby in World War II
- In Love and War (2011 film), a South Korean film
- "In Love and War", the eighth episode of the sixth season of M*A*S*H

== Music ==
- In Love & War (Amerie album), 2009
- In Love and War (Francis Magalona and Ely Buendia album), 2010

== Fiction ==
- Alex Preston (2014). In Love and War (novel)

== See also ==
- Love and War (disambiguation)
