= Bryson Graham =

English musical artist (1952–1993)

- Born: Bryson Macrae Graham; 12 September 1952
- Died: 6 December 1993 (aged 41)
- Instrument: Drums
- Formerly of: Spooky Tooth, Girl

Bryson Macrae Graham (12 September 1952 – 6 December 1993) was an English rock drummer, most notable as a member of Mainhorse, Spooky Tooth and Girl, and as a session musician.

== Life and career ==
Bryson Macrae Graham was born to parents Joe Graham and Doreen Graham (née Bywaters), on 12 September 1952. He had an older brother named Raymond.

Bryson Graham commenced his professional recording career, at the age of seventeen as a member of Mainhorse Airline, with David Kubinec, Patrick Moraz, and Jean Ristori (late summer 1969 to 1970). Kubinec left, and guitarist Auguste De Antoni was replaced by Peter Lockett; the band's name being shortened to Mainhorse (1970 to mid-1971) who released one album under this name. He also played with Gary Wright and Wonderwheel, including George Harrison as a special guest member, on The Dick Cavett Show. Graham later played with Alvin Lee and Ten Years After.

Graham was a member of Spooky Tooth and appeared on two of their albums: You Broke My Heart So I Busted Your Jaw (1973), and The Mirror (1974).

He later played for the glam rock band Girl. He played on Wasted Youth (1982) and on Live at the Exposition Hall, Osaka, Japan (2001; originally recorded 1982).

In 1983, he recorded an album with Zahara, a group with several notable members including Reebop Kwaku Baah (percussion), Paul Delph (keyboards), and Rosko Gee (bass).

He was later a prolific session musician and worked with Gary Wright, co-writing the score for the film Benjamin. He took part in the punk and new wave scenes, playing with Ian North in Neo and recording the album Neo. He briefly replaced JJ Johnson in the Electric Chairs when JJ refuse to fly to the United States. He also played on three albums by ex-Traffic drummer Jim Capaldi, and Money and the Magic (1990) to support ex-Girl band member Gerry Laffy's solo career. Graham also worked with Dave Stewart and Barbara Gaskin, plus Richard Dobson on In Texas Last December (1976), and with Rabbit Bundrick on Dark Saloon (1974).

Graham died in December 1993 at the age of 41.

Preceded by Pete Barnacle	Girl drummer	Succeeded by
