= John Lindsay (disambiguation) =

John Lindsay (1921–2000) was an American politician who served as U.S. Representative from New York and mayor of New York City.

John, Jon or Jack Lindsay may also refer to:

== Entertainment ==
- John Lindsay (musician) (1894–1950), American jazz musician
- John Jesnor Lindsay (1935–2006), Scottish photographer
- Jon Lindsay (musician) (born 1980/1981), American musician
- Jon Lindsay (Coronation Street), fictional character

== Politics ==
- John Lindsay of Wauchope (died c. 1310), Scottish noble
- John Lindsay, 6th Earl of Crawford (died 1513)
- John Lindsay, 17th Earl of Crawford (1596–1678)
- John Lindsay, 19th Earl of Crawford (died 1713), Scottish peer and politician
- John Lindsay, 20th Earl of Crawford (1702–1749), Scottish peer and the first colonel of the Black Watch
- John Lindsay (South Australian politician) (1821–1898), businessman and politician in South Australia
- John Lindsay (Western Australian politician) (1876–1957), politician in Western Australia
- Jon Lindsay (politician) (1935–2026), member of Texas Senate, 1997–2007

== Sports ==
- Jack Lindsay (footballer, born 1921) (1921–2006), Scottish footballer who played for Bury, Carlisle United, Southport and Wigan Athletic
- Johnny Lindsay (John Dixon Lindsay, 1908–1990), South African cricketer
- John Lindsay (New Zealand cricketer) (born 1957), New Zealand cricketer
- John Lindsay (footballer, born 1862) (1862–1932), Scottish association football player for Scotland and Accrington F.C.
- John Lindsay (footballer, born 1900) (1900–?), Scottish association football player for Partick Thistle, Rhyl Athletic, Liverpool, Swansea Town and Bangor City
- John Lindsay (footballer, born 1924) (1924–1991), Scottish association football player for Rangers and Everton
- John Lindsay (Paralympian) (born 1970), Australian Paralympian

== Others ==
- Jack Lindsay (1900–1990), Australian-born British writer and poet
- John de Lindsay (died 1335), bishop of Glasgow
- John Lindsay, 5th Lord Lindsay (died 1563), Scottish judge
- John Lindsay of Balcarres, Lord Menmuir (1552–1598), chancellor of the University of St Andrews, 1597–1598
- John Lindsay (Royal Navy officer) (1737–1788), British naval officer and father of Dido Elizabeth Belle

== See also ==
- John Lindesay (died 1751), founder of the settlement of Cherry Valley, Otsego County, New York
- John Lindsey (born 1977), baseball player
- John Lindsey (1909–1975), writer.
