= Girl (band) =

English glam metal band (1979-1982)

- Girl in the early 1980s

Background information
- Origin: London, England
- Genres: Hard rock; glam metal
- Years active: 1979–1982
- Label: Jet Records
- Past members: Phil Lewis; Gerry Laffy; Phil Collen; Jonathon Trevisick; Dave Gaynor; Mark Megary; Simon Laffy; Pete Barnacle; Bryson Graham; Pete Bonas

Girl were an English glam metal band formed in London in 1979. They split up in 1982 with band members going on to join Def Leppard and L.A. Guns, among others.

== History ==
Girl were formed in 1979 by vocalist Phil Lewis, guitarists Gerry Laffy and Phil Collen, drummer Jonathon Trevisick (replaced shortly thereafter by Dave Gaynor), and bassist Mark Megary (replaced shortly thereafter by Simon Laffy). Collen had previously been in the bands Lucy, Tush, and Dumb Blondes. Girl were first discovered and managed by Jon Lindsay who was looking for bands for former manager of The Who, Kit Lambert, for a proposed new record label. Lindsay and Girl separated over managerial decisions when the band wanted to sign a recording deal with Don Arden instead of a recording contract negotiated by Lindsay with music figure Simon Napier-Bell's Nomis Publishing.

The band were signed by Jet Records, releasing two singles prior to their debut album Sheer Greed (1980), which reached number 33 in the UK Albums Chart. The band's profile was raised by tours with the Pat Travers Band and UFO, in the midst of the new wave of British heavy metal explosion. Girl recorded a pre-L.A. Guns version of the song "Hollywood Tease", which peaked at No. 50 in the UK Singles Chart in April 1980.

Gaynor left in 1981, to be replaced by former Gillan/Broken Home drummer Pete Barnacle. However, following several live dates with the band, Barnacle himself was replaced by Bryson Graham during the recording of the next album. Both Barnacle and Graham appear on Girl's second album Wasted Youth which was released in 1982 and reached number 92 in the UK. Pete Bonas replaced Phil Collen, who left to join Def Leppard, though the band broke up soon after.

Girl still have six albums available through Sanctuary Records (previously released by Don Arden's Jet Records): Sheer Greed, Wasted Youth, Killing Time, Live at the Marquee, Live at the Exposition Hall, Osaka, Japan, the 37 track anthology My Number: The Anthology, Bootleg - Live in Tokyo 1980 and Girl-Sheer Greed-Gerry Laffy - The Rare DVD Collection.

After the band's dissolution, Phil Lewis joined The London Cowboys, then Airrace, and in 1987 L.A. Guns. Lewis also sang with New Torpedos, Tormé, Filthy Lucre, and The Liberators.

Gerry Laffy, Simon Laffy, and Pete Barnacle went on to play in Sheer Greed, which also featured guest appearances from both Lewis and Collen. Sheer Greed also recorded two versions of "Hollywood Tease", one recorded in studio for the album Sublime to the Ridiculous and another live for Live in London.

Collen and Simon Laffy are currently in a band called Man Raze, along with former Sex Pistols drummer Paul Cook.

== Members ==
- Phil Lewis – vocals (1979–1982)
- Gerry Laffy – guitars (1979–1982)
- Phil Collen – guitars (1979–1982)
- Jonathon Trevisick – drums (1979)
- Dave Gaynor – drums (1979–1981)
- Mark Megary – bass (1979)
- Simon Laffy – bass (1979–1982)
- Pete Barnacle – drums (1981–1982)
- Bryson Graham – drums (1982)
- Pete Bonas – guitars (1982)

== Discography ==
=== Studio albums ===
- Sheer Greed (1980) - UK No. 33
- Wasted Youth (1982) - UK No. 92

=== Live albums ===
- Live at the Marquee (2001)
- Live at the Exposition Hall, Osaka, Japan (2001)
- Live at the Greyhound: Fulham London 1982 (2013)
- Live at the Paris Theatre: London 1980 (2013)
- Rainbow Tease (2013)
- Live in London (2014)

=== Compilations ===
- Killing Time (1997)
- My Number: The Anthology (2001)

=== Bootlegs ===
- Live in London 2-23-82
- Live in Tokyo 1980 (possibly the same as Tokyo, Japan 11-26-80)

=== Singles ===
- Hollywood Tease (12/04/1980) - UK No. 50

== Videography ==
- Girl-Sheer Greed-Gerry Laffy: The Rare DVD Collection (2006)

== See also ==
- List of new wave of British heavy metal bands
