= Jean-Baptiste Sipido =

Belgian anarchist (1884–1959)

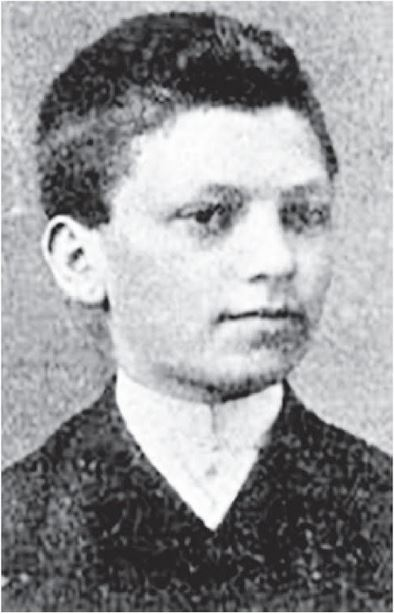
Jean-Baptiste Sipido, before 1901

Jean-Baptiste Victor Sipido (20 December 1884 – 20 August 1959) was a Belgian anarchist who became known when he, then a young tinsmith's apprentice, attempted to assassinate Albert Edward, Prince of Wales (later Edward VII), at the Brussels-North railway station in Brussels on 5 April 1900.

Accusing the Prince of causing the slaughter of thousands during the Boer War in South Africa, the fifteen-year-old leaped onto the foot board of the royal compartment right before the train left the station and fired two shots through the window. Sipido missed everyone inside and was quickly wrestled to the ground.

The assassination attempt and the following trial is notable mostly for the acquittal of Sipido. His guilt was quite obvious, but he was less than 16 years old. The jury "held that by reason of his age he had not acted with discernment and could not be considered doli capax" or legally responsible. The court did not even detain Sipido in a reformatory. After the trial, Sipido immediately crossed the border to France.

The acquittal caused a very hostile reaction from Britain, with the leader of the House of Commons, Arthur Balfour, calling it a "grave and most unfortunate miscarriage of justice".

Sipido ended his working life as technical and commercial director of the General Society of Belgian Socialist Cooperatives, later retiring to Cagnes in the Department of Alpes-Maritimes in France.
