= Qasim Al-Malak =

Iraqi actor

- قاسم الملاك
- Born: November 21, 1946 (age 79); Basra, Kingdom of Iraq
- Years active: 1970–present
- Children: Ali Al-Malak Ola Al-Malak Mohammed Al-Malak

Qasim Al-Malak is an Iraqi actor. He was born in Basra in 1946. He played well-established comedic characters such as the role of (Rajab) in the series (The Wolf and the Eyes of the city). Al-Malak played one of the most prominent roles in Iraqi cinema and is most involved in films that swept theaters and achieved huge revenues in the Iraqi cinema box office failure at that time.

== His contributions to Iraqi cinema ==
- The head movie directed by Faisal Al Yasiri 1976
- The Big Question 1979 movie
- A Bride but, directed by Hussein Amin
- Faeq Marries Directed by Ibrahim Abdel Jalil 1984
- Love in Baghdad with Iqbal Naim
- The Flaming Borders directed by Faisal Al-Yasiri 1986
- Building 13 directed by Sahib Haddad 1988
- Assume Yourself Happy Directed by Abdul Hadi Al-Rawi
- Six on Six – Directed by Khairiya Al-Mansour
- One Hundred Percent – Directed by Khairiya Al-Mansour
- King Ghazi Directed by Muhammad Shukri Jamil 1992

== As actor ==
- Muhammad bin al-Qasim al-Thaqafi series
- The Jurf Al-Malah series directed by Ibrahim Abdel-Jalil
- The Wolf and Eyes of the City series, written by Adel Kazem, directed by Ibrahim Abdel Jalil
- The Eagle and Eyes of the City series, written by Adel Kazem, directed by Ibrahim Abdel Jalil
- Rebel series
- Adel gets married series
- The first and second parts of the series Love and War Part 1, directed by Jamal Abdel Jassim
- The Next Destiny series directed by Azzam Saleh
- Coffee aroma series
- Dar Dour series directed by Jamal Abed Jassim
- The Saeq Al-Souta series directed by Jamal Abed Jassem
- The first lesson series directed by Jamal Abed Jassim
- Al-Titi series, collecting the train, directed by Jamal Abed Jassim
- Me and the Majnun series directed by Jamal Abed Jassim
- The series Al-Ardah Al-Halji, written by Qassem Al-Malak, directed by Jamal Abed Jassim
- The series (One + One) (directed by Jamal Abed Jassim)
- The First Lie series, directed by Hassan Hosni

== In theater ==
- Al-Dukhana 1967 with Wajih Abdel-Ghani and Qaid Al-Nomani
- The Kingdom of Beggars 1986, starring Qassem Al Malak, Rasim Al Jumaily
- A Journey Around the World Qasim Al Malak Millions 1996

== Administrative Positions ==
- Drama Director – Al-Baghdadiya Channel
- Director of the National Acting Troupe for ten years
- Theater manager
- Director of the National Folklore Troupe
