= Gerry Laffy =

British musician

- Born: 4 January 1960 (age 66); Hoxton, London, England
- Genres: Rock, hard rock, glam rock
- Occupation: Musician
- Instruments: Guitar, vocals
- Years active: 1978–present
- Website: gerrylaffyart.com

Gerry Laffy (born 4 January 1960) is a British singer and guitarist who has played in the bands Girl, The London Cowboys, Sheer Greed, John Taylor, and Ultravox among others. Girl are still cited as an influence by many major artists twenty years later, even though they disbanded after only three years, allegedly due to their record company and mismanagement. In total Gerry Laffy has released or performed on over 30 albums; he has played in venues as diverse as Wembley Arena, Taipei Hard Rock Cafe, the Reading Festival.

== Musical career ==
In 1978, Laffy was a founding member of the band Girl (along with Philip Lewis). Girl were first discovered by promoter Jon Lindsay, a partner of the former manager of The Who, Kit Lambert. Lambert and Lindsay were seeking out bands to sign to Lambert's new record company during the fledgling Nu Romantics era. The band were first introduced to music publisher Simon Napier-Bell of Nomis but eventually signed a recording deal with Jet Records. The band became famous after their now infamous three-night residency at the former Marquee Club in Wardour St. and recorded three albums and put out two (Sheer Greed and Wasted Youth) between 1980 and 1983. Killing Time was finally released in 1998, and two live albums and an anthology were released later. After Girl disintegrated, Laffy joined The London Cowboys, (with former members of The Idols, Sex Pistols and New York Dolls), which released two albums in 1985. He then played guitar on demos of Duran Duran's 1986 Notorious album. In 1990, Laffy founded GL Records and released the solo album Money & the Magic. The song "Shoot 'Em Down" from this album was included on the European soundtrack to the film Highlander II: The Quickening. Laffy formed Sheer Greed with some of Girl's alumni, which put out two albums in 1992 and 1993. He followed up with a joint Gerry Laffy/Simon Laffy album called Lying With Angels, then a guest appearance on the 1994 album Revelation from Ultravox. From mid-1997 to mid-2000, Laffy was lead guitarist in Terroristen, John Taylor's band while on hiatus from Duran Duran. Terroristen recorded constantly and gigged all over the United States and Japan, also travelling to Taiwan and Germany. In 2001, he released a second solo album All Day Long. In 2005, Gerry was a guest vocalist with ex-Freddie Mercury guitarist Chris Chesney on his album Diabolical Liberties. In 2007, a third solo album – The Icebox Studio Sessions was released. Self performed, written and produced. In July 2009 Girl were approached to reform for a 30th Anniversary tour of Japan & UK in 2010. It is yet to be confirmed. 2013 saw Gerry Laffy solo albums No.4. Entitled 'Just A Little Blurred'and 'Wrecked But Not Crushed' BOTH self performed, written and produced. 'Just A Little Blurred' features an update of the Girl classic 'My Number' with guest Craig Bundy on bass.

== Other ventures ==
=== Film ===
For fifteen years, from 1982 to 1997, Laffy worked as personal manager for film director Russell Mulcahy. They formed the company LeBad Films together. Laffy also served as Mulcahy's personal assistant on his first three features Razorback, Highlander, and Duran Duran's Arena. He managed Mulcahy through the pinnacle of his career, including ten feature films and dozens of award-winning music videos (including Duran Duran, Queen, The Rolling Stones, Billy Joel, Elton John and Fleetwood Mac) and commercials (including Ford, Smirnoff, Opel, BP, Universal Studios and Miller Brewing). In 1995, he established his own film production company Laffy Michaels Filmworks, which set up John Carpenter's $20 million film Vampires, starring James Woods.

=== Art ===
Before his first band, Laffy started his career as a graphic artist at London Weekend Television. Since 2001, he has come full circle and is now a London-based artist with a clientele for his quirky, funky pop art/mixed media canvases.

== Discography ==
- 1980 – Girl: Sheer Greed
- 1982 – Girl: Wasted Youth
- 1998 – Girl: Killing Time (* finally released)
- 1999 – Girl: Live at the Marquee
- 1999 – Girl: Live at the Exposition Hall, Osaka, Japan
- 2002 – Girl: My Number: The Anthology
- 1985 – The London Cowboys: Dance Crazy
- 1985 – The London Cowboys: Live at the Milkweg Amsterdam
- 1990 – Gerry Laffy: Money & the Magic
- 1990 – Highlander II European Soundtrack: song: Gerry Laffy "Shoot 'Em Down" from Money & The Magic
- 1992 – Sheer Greed: Sublime to the Ridiculous
- 1993 – Sheer Greed: Live in London (re-released 2012 as a limited edition signed twin album run)
- 1994 – Gerry & Simon Laffy: Lying with Angels
- 1994 – Ultravox: Revelation (CD)
- 1997 – John Taylor, Feelings Are Good (CD)
- 1998 – John Taylor Terroristen, 5.30.98 (EP)
- 1998 – Roxy Music Tribute album: Dream Home Heartaches (CD)
- 1999 – John Taylor, Meltdown (recorded in 1992)
- 1999 – John Taylor, Juicy Jeans Promo Sampler (EP)
- 1999 – John Taylor, The Japan Album (CD)
- 2000 – John Taylor, Japanese (EP)
- 2000 – John Taylor, Live Cuts (CD)
- 2001 – John Taylor, Techno for Two (CD)
- 2001 – Gerry Laffy: All Day Long
- 2005 – Chris Chesney & Gerry Laffy – Diabolical Liberties
- 2006 – Girl – Live Bootlegs – Tokyo 1980
- 2006 – Girl – The Rare DVD Collection
- 2007 – Gerry Laffy – The Icebox Studio Sessions
- 2013 – Gerry Laffy – Just a Little Blurred + Free promo Girl – Live at The Greyhound (London) 1982
- 2013 – Wrecked But Not Crushed + Free promo Girl Live at the Paris Theater (London) 1980
- 2016 – Girl: Sheer Greed – Rock Candy re-release
- 2016 – Girl: Wasted Youth – Rock Candy re-release
- 2019 – Girl Sheer Greed – Live in Osaka – Cherry Red Records box set
- 2019 – Wasted Youth – 6 CD's including Wasted Youth and live releases – Cherry Red Records
