= Simon Laffy =

English novelist and bassist

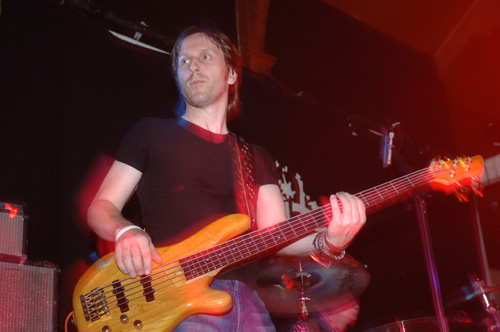
- pic: Hayley Madden

Background information
- Born: 11 October 1958 (age 67); Finchley, London, England
- Origin: Hoxton, London, England
- Genres: Rock
- Occupation: Bassist
- Instrument: Bass
- Labels: CBS Records, London Records, Virgin Records, Surrealist Records, MTV Records, Universal Music Group
- Member of: Man Raze (2004–present)
- Formerly of: Girl (1979–1983); Hard Rain (1984–1988); Wild Frontiers (1989–1991); Sheer Greed (1991–1994)
- Writing career
- Education: City, University of London (1994–1998, BEng)
- Period: 2010–present
- Genre: Literary fiction
- Website: simonlaffy.com

Simon Laffy (born 11 October 1958) is an English novelist and bassist, a member of Man Raze and former member of Girl.

== Career ==
Simon Laffy was born at home in Hoxton, London. He started playing music at fourteen years old, inspired by his musician brother, Steve. He joined his first band at fifteen and was playing in London clubs (Dingwalls, The Embassy, Maunkberrys) before being legally old enough to be in them. Simon signed his first record deal with glam rock band Girl at twenty one years old and toured Europe, the Far East and the UK. Subsequently, he has played at most venues in Britain, including Wembley Arena, Hammersmith Odeon, the Marquee Club and at the Download, Reading and Phoenix Festivals.

His music career included working as a producer, composer, arranger, performer, engineer, programmer, live mixer and DJ. He has played on fifteen albums and eighteen singles, as well as performing on countless studio sessions, TV appearances and radio broadcasts, interviews, photo sessions and approximately two thousand gigs. In 2004, Simon formed a rock band, Man Raze, with his former Girl bandmate Phil Collen from Def Leppard and Paul Cook from the Sex Pistols and began a dance album project called Pearl Avenue with Joel Parkes, the Canadian singer/songwriter. Man Raze also formed their own record company, Surrealist Records.

Simon Laffy began a writing career in 2010 and has published three historical fiction novels, titled Seed of Satan, Red Sunrise and Fire of the Sun, on the ACM Retro Ltd imprint.

Simon Laffy is the brother of Gerry Laffy.
