= Ratt discography =

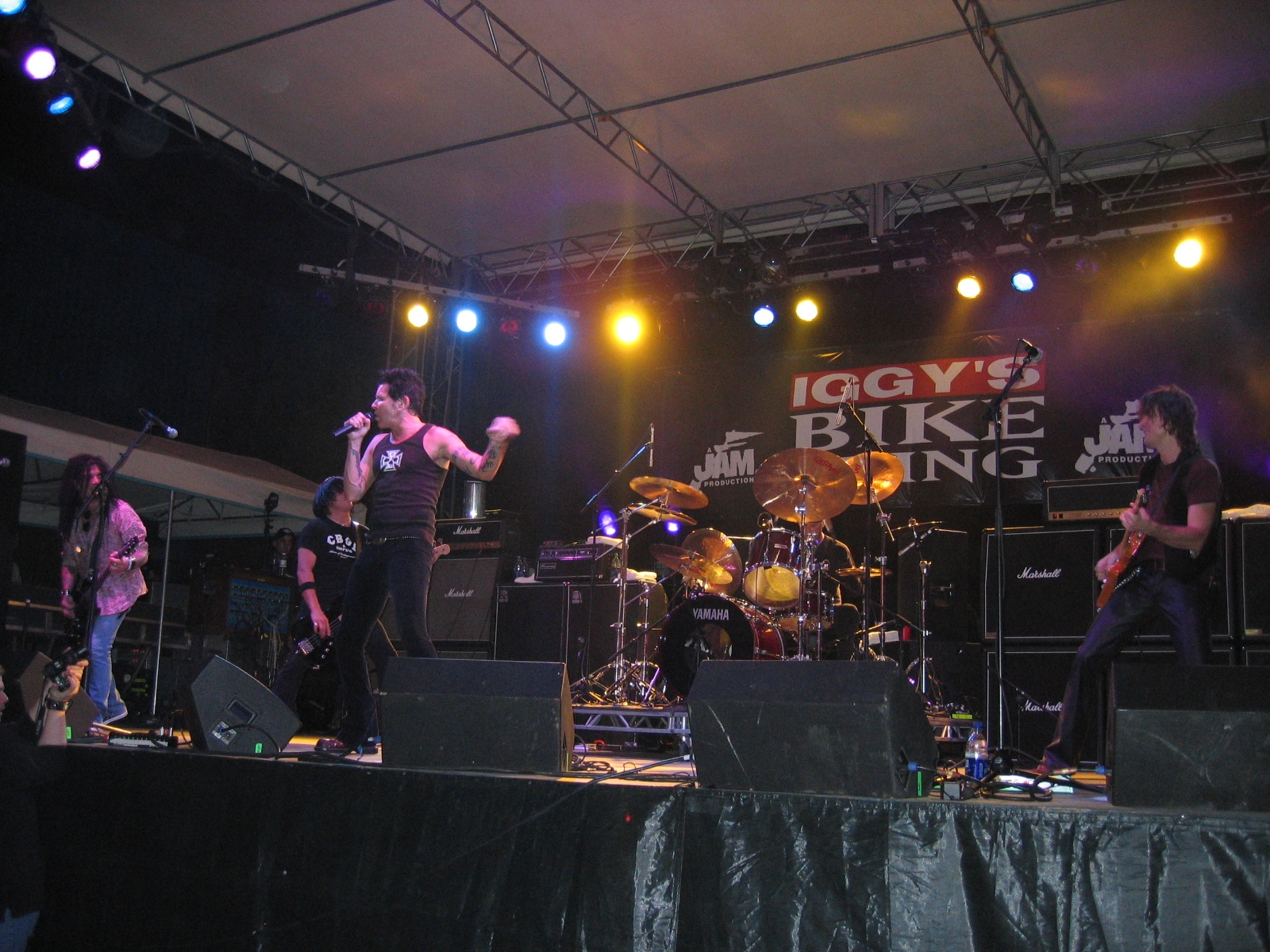
- Ratt performing in 2005
- Studio albums: 7
- Extended plays: 1
- Compilation albums: 6
- Singles: 22
- Video albums: 3
- Music videos: 17

This is the complete discography for the American glam metal band Ratt.

== Studio albums ==
Year	Album details	Peak chart positions					Certifications
Year	Album details	US	CAN	SWI	UK	JPN	Certifications
1984	Out of the Cellar: Released: February 17, 1984; Label: Atlantic Records	7	12	—	—	—	US: 3× Platinum; CAN: Gold
1985	Invasion of Your Privacy: Released: May 30, 1985; Label: Atlantic Records	7	36	—	50	—	US: 2× Platinum
1986	Dancing Undercover: Released: September 24, 1986; Label: Atlantic Records	26	49	—	51	—	US: Platinum
1988	Reach for the Sky: Released: October 24, 1988; Label: Atlantic Records	17	—	—	82	—	US: Platinum
1990	Detonator: Released: August 21, 1990; Label: Atlantic Records	23	—	—	55	—	US: Gold
1999	Ratt: Released: July 6, 1999; Label: Portrait Records	169	—	—	—	—	
2010	Infestation: Released: April 20, 2010; Label: Loud & Proud/Roadrunner	30	55	78	—	5	

== EPs ==
Year	Album details	Peak chart positions	Sales
Year	Album details	US	Sales
1983	Ratt: Released: August 23, 1983; Label: Time Coast Communications	133	300,000

== Compilation albums ==
Year	Album details	Peak chart positions	Certifications
Year	Album details	Billboard 200	Certifications
1991	Ratt & Roll 81–91: Released: April 6, 1991; Label: Atlantic Records	57	US: Gold
1997	Collage: Released: July 22, 1997; Label: DeRock	—	
2002	The Essentials: Released: 2002; Label: Atlantic Records	—	
2003	Ratt: Metal Hits: Released: 2003; Label: Rhino Records	—	
2007	Tell the World: The Very Best of Ratt: Released: August 21, 2007; Label: Rhino Records	—	
2011	Flashback with Ratt: Released: June 21, 2011; Label: Rhino Records	—	

== Videos ==
- Ratt: The Video (1985)
- Detonator Videoaction 1991 (1991)
- Videos from the Cellar: The Atlantic Years (2007)

== Singles ==
Year	Title	Peak chart positions				Certifications	Album
Year	Title	US	Main Rock	CAN	UK	Certifications	Album
1982	"Tell the World"	—	—	—	—		Metal Massacre
1983	"You Think You're Tough"	—	—	—	—		Ratt EP
1984	"Round and Round"	12	4	16	—		Out of the Cellar
1984	"Back for More" [airplay]	—	27	—	—		Out of the Cellar
1984	"Wanted Man"	87	38	—	—		Out of the Cellar
1984	"Lack of Communication"	—	—	—	—		Out of the Cellar
1985	"Lay It Down"	40	11	—	77		Invasion of Your Privacy
1985	"You're In Love"	89	34	67	82		Invasion of Your Privacy
1986	"What You Give Is What You Get"	—	—	—	—		Invasion of Your Privacy
1986	"Dance"	59	36	—	—		Dancing Undercover
1987	"Body Talk"	—	—	—	—		Dancing Undercover
1988	"Way Cool Jr."	75	16	57	—		Reach for the Sky
1989	"I Want a Woman"	—	—	—	—		Reach for the Sky
1990	"Lovin' You's a Dirty Job"	—	18	—	—		Detonator
1990	"Shame Shame Shame"	—	—	—	—		Detonator
1991	"Givin' Yourself Away"	—	39	56	—		Detonator
1999	"Over the Edge"	—	36	—	—		Ratt
2010	"Best of Me"	—	36	—	—		Infestation
2010	"Eat Me Up Alive"	—	—	—	—		Infestation

== Music videos ==
Year	Title	Album
1984	"Round and Round"	Out of the Cellar
1984	"Back for More"	Out of the Cellar
1984	"Wanted Man"	Out of the Cellar
1984	"You Think You're Tough"	Ratt
1985	"Lay It Down"	Invasion of Your Privacy
1985	"You're in Love"	Invasion of Your Privacy
1986	"Dance"	Dancing Undercover
1986	"Body Talk"	Dancing Undercover
1987	"Slip of the Lip"	Dancing Undercover
1988	"Way Cool Jr."	Reach for the Sky
1989	"I Want a Woman"	Reach for the Sky
1990	"Lovin' You's a Dirty Job"	Detonator
1990	"Shame Shame Shame"	Detonator
1991	"Givin' Yourself Away"	Detonator
1991	"Nobody Rides for Free"	Point Break OST
2010	"Best of Me"	Infestation
2010	"Eat Me Up Alive"	Infestation
