= List of Ratt members =

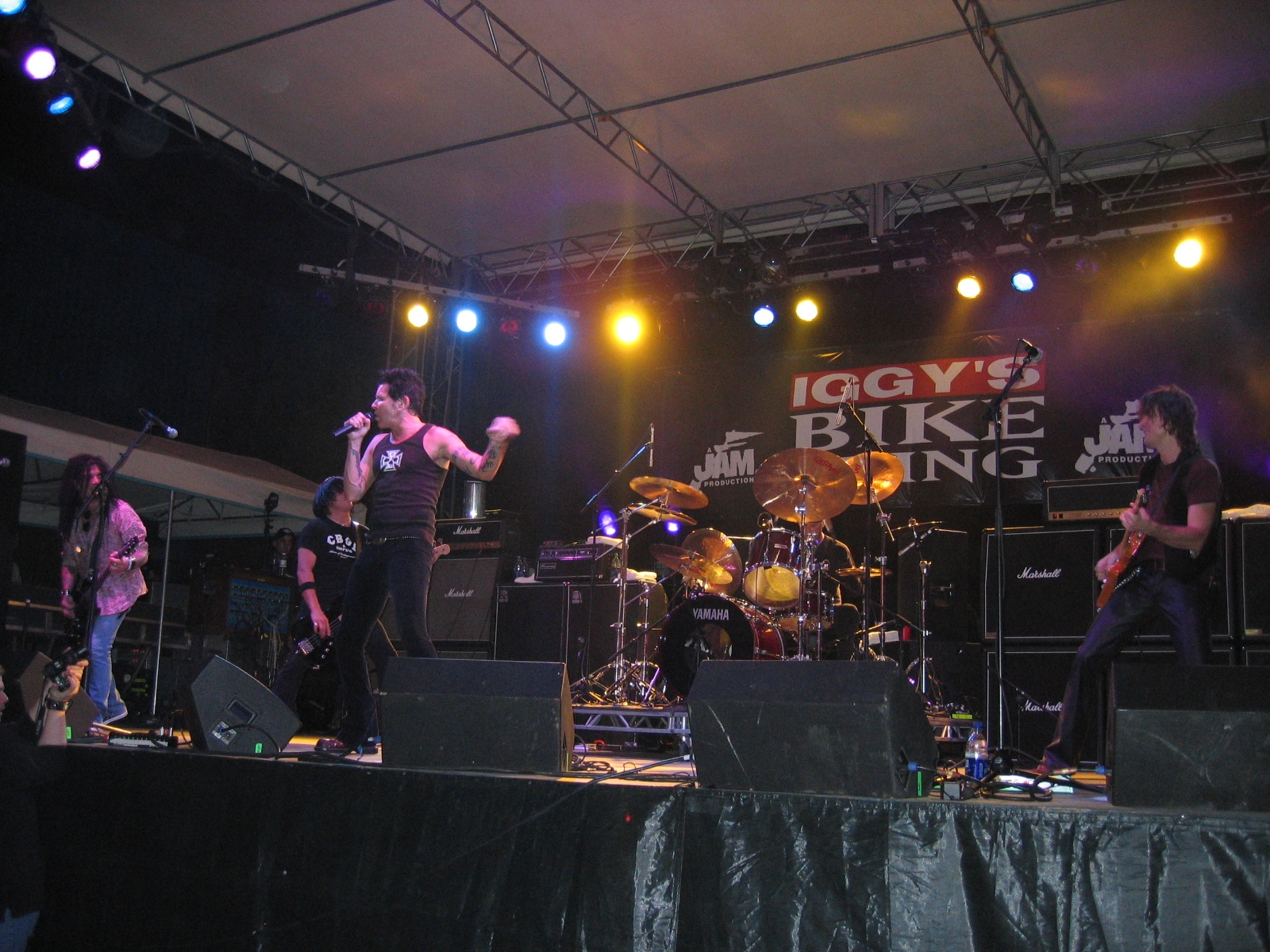
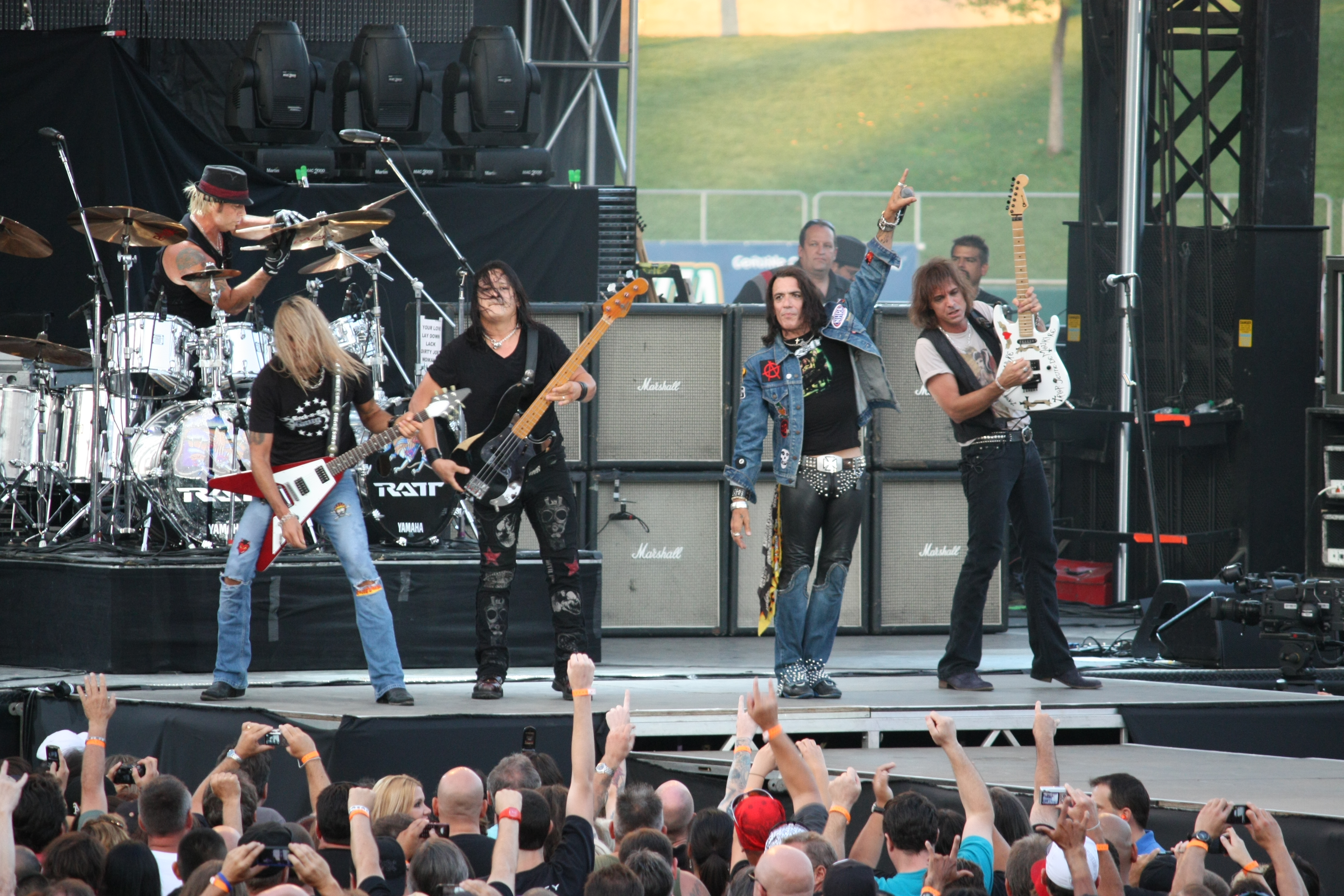
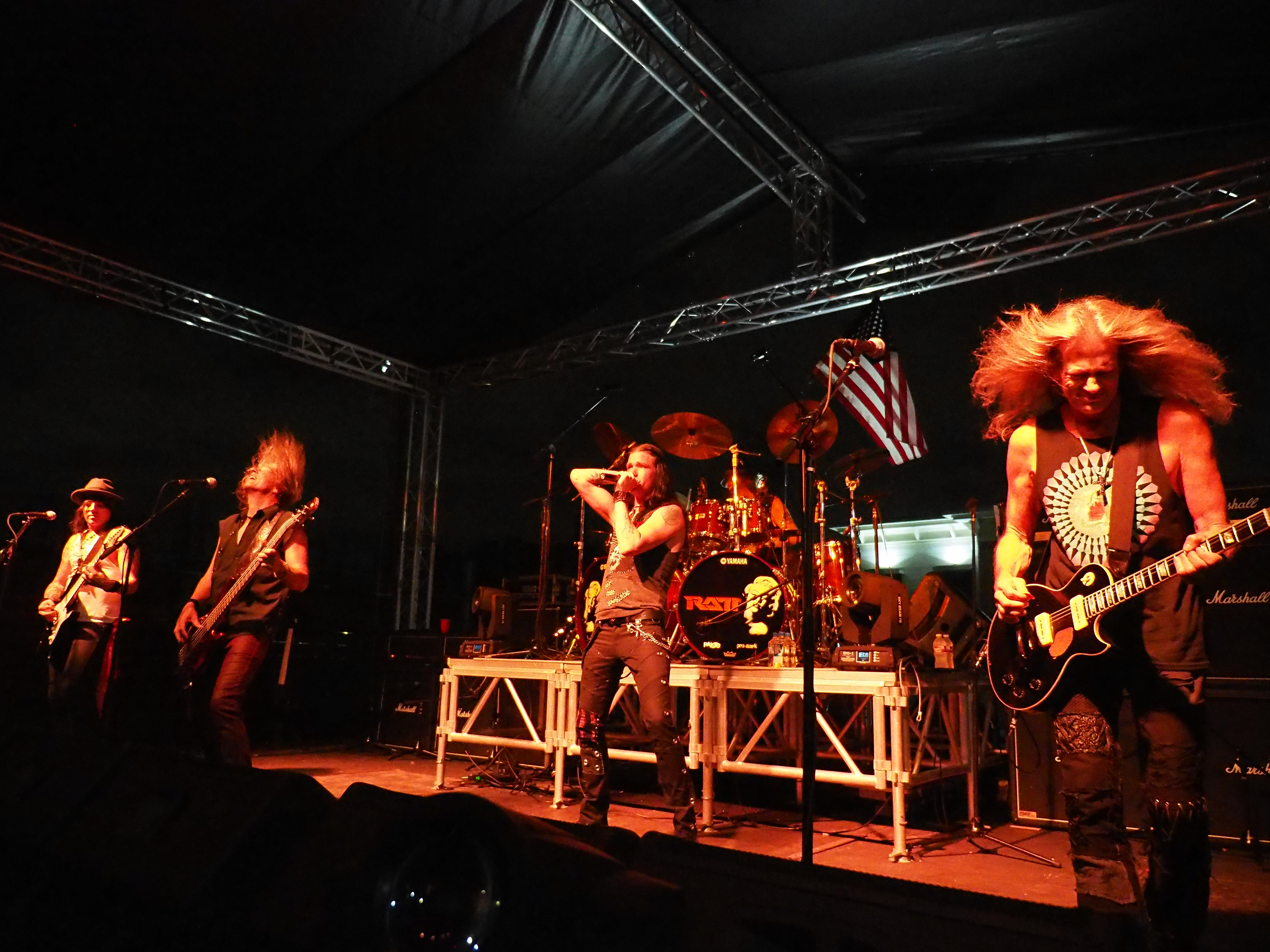
Ratt performing in 2005 (top), 2010 (middle) and 2016 (bottom)

Ratt was an American glam metal band from Hollywood, California. Formed in 1977 under the name Mickey Ratt, the group originally included lead vocalist and guitarist Stephen Pearcy, lead guitarist Chris Hager, bassist Tim Garcia and drummer John Turner. In 1982, Ratt finalised its "classic lineup" of Pearcy, guitarist Warren DeMartini, guitarist Robbin Crosby, bassist Juan Croucier and drummer Bobby Blotzer, that lasted through 1991. The band has been through numerous lineup changes. The band has been on hiatus since 2022, at which point it consisted of Pearcy (who was absent between 2000 and 2007), Juan Croucier (who rejoined in 2012), lead guitarist Jordan Ziff, drummer Pete Holmes (who both joined in 2018), and rhythm guitarist Frankie Lindia (who joined in mid-2021).

== History ==
=== 1977–1983 ===
Ratt originally formed in Hollywood, California in 1977 under the name Mickey Ratt. The band originally included lead vocalist and rhythm guitarist Stephen Pearcy, lead guitarist Chris Hager, bassist and backing vocalist Tim Garcia, and drummer Bob Eisenberg. After John Turner took over from Eisenberg, the band relocated to Los Angeles in January 1980. Garcia opted to return to San Diego not long after, and was replaced by Dave Jellison a few months later. Paul DeNisco briefly joined as a second guitarist. After a few years of touring, Hager left in 1981 to pursue other projects, with Turner and Jellison following not long after. Pearcy rebuilt the band with the addition of guitarists Jake E. Lee and Bob DeLellis, bassist Matt Thorr and drummer Dave Alford, as well as renaming it M. Ratt and, later, Ratt.

The lineup lasted only a few months, with Alford and Lee quitting after Pearcy fired DeLellis without consulting them. The pair subsequently formed Rough Cutt together. Thorr remained the band's bassist, alongside new additions Warren DeMartini and Robbin Crosby on guitars, and Khurt Maier on drums. This lineup recorded "Tell the World" for the first edition of the Metal Blade compilation Metal Massacre. Thorr was briefly replaced by Gene Hunter, however by the end of the year the group had finalised its classic lineup of Pearcy, DeMartini, Crosby, bassist Juan Croucier and drummer Bobby Blotzer. Marq Torien briefly joined on guitar in 1982. Joey Cristofanilli temporarily took over from Croucier in 1983, but he returned once he left Dokken later in the year.

=== 1983–2012 ===
Ratt's lineup remained constant throughout the rest of the 1980s, as they released a series of commercially successful albums. In 1991, Crosby was forced to leave the group due to a "debilitating addiction to heroin". He was temporarily replaced by Michael Schenker for a series of tour dates. In early 1992, Pearcy opted to leave Ratt to form the supergroup Arcade. As a result, the group was subsequently disbanded. In 1996, the band reunited with Pearcy, DeMartini and Blotzer joined by bassist Robbie Crane, after plans for a full classic lineup reunion fell through. Keri Kelli joined as a second guitarist in early 1999, in time for a tour starting in May. In January 2000, however, Pearcy suddenly left the band just before the start of a tour. Kelli also left shortly after the vocalist's departure.

Pearcy and Kelli were replaced by former L.A. Guns frontman Jizzy Pearl and former Mötley Crüe frontman John Corabi, respectively. Robert Mason was initially invited to take over on vocals, but he declined. Classic lineup guitarist Crosby died on June 6, 2002, after contracting HIV and overdosing on heroin. Pearl remained the band's vocalist until December 2006, when he left amid rumors of a classic lineup reunion. A few months later, it was confirmed that Pearcy was returning for tour dates throughout 2007. Corabi remained until August 2008, when he was replaced by former Quiet Riot guitarist Carlos Cavazo. After the band released its first studio album in 11 years, Infestation, in 2010, Crane announced in March 2012 that he had left Ratt to focus on Lynch Mob, which he joined in 2010.

=== 2012 onwards ===
Croucier returned to take Crane's place in May 2012. Blotzer was temporarily replaced for a run of shows in early 2014, as he had yet to recover from neck surgery he underwent the previous October. In April 2014, Pearcy announced that he had left Ratt for a third time, blaming the "constant turmoil" and other controversies surrounding the band. The following September, Blotzer rebranded his new group from Bobby Blotzer's Ratt Experience to simply Ratt, having "taken control" of the brand, with the drummer joined by lead vocalist Joshua Alan, guitarists Michael "Doc" Ellis and Nicolas "Blaze" Baum, and bassist Scotty Griffin. DeMartini later sued Blotzer over the use of the Ratt name, however this was denied by a court ruling. Griffin was replaced by Robbie Crane in February 2016, and both Blaze and Crane left in August. They were replaced initially by Stacey Blades and Todd Kerns, respectively, and later on a more permanent basis by Mitch Perry and Brad Lang. Blades remained as a replacement for Ellis. Alan left the band in January 2017 to pursue other projects. He was replaced by Seann Nicols, although the band performed only one show and has been inactive since March 2017.

In November 2016, Pearcy, DeMartini and Croucier regained ownership of the Ratt name from Blotzer, expelling him from the original partnership and reforming the band with Carlos Cavazo and Jimmy DeGrasso. The band returned to touring, but in March 2018, it was reported that DeMartini had been fired from the band. A few days later, Cavazo confirmed the news and added that he had also left the band. In June, Pearcy and Croucier assured that they would continue with Ratt, and the following month the group returned with new members Jordan Ziff on lead guitar, Chris Sanders on rhythm guitar and Pete Holmes on drums. Sanders was later replaced by former David Lee Roth guitarist Frankie Lindia.

== Members ==
Image	Name	Years active	Instruments	Release contributions
	Stephen Pearcy	1977–1992; 1996–2000; 2007–2014; 2016–2022	lead vocals; rhythm guitar (1977–1980, 1996–1997)	all Ratt releases to date
	Chris Hager	1977–1981 (died 2025)	lead guitar	"Drivin' on E" (1980)
	Tim Garcia	1977–1980 (died 2011)	bass; backing vocals	"Drivin' on E" (1980)
	Bob Eisenberg	1977	drums	none
	John Turner	1977–1981 (died 2022)	drums	"Drivin' on E" (1980)
	Dave Jellison	1980–1981	bass; backing vocals	none
	Paul DeNisco	1980	rhythm guitar	none
	Matt Thorr (Matt Thorne)	1981–1982	bass; backing vocals	"Tell the World" (1982)
	Jake E. Lee (Jakey Lou Williams)	1981	lead guitar	none
	Bob DeLellis	1981	rhythm guitar	none
	Dave Alford	1981	drums	none
	Robbin Crosby	1981–1991 (died 2002)	lead and rhythm guitar; backing vocals	all Ratt releases from "Tell the World" (1982) to Collage (1997)
	Warren DeMartini	1981–1982; 1982–1992; 1996–2014; 2016–2018	lead and rhythm guitar; backing vocals	all Ratt releases from "Tell the World" (1982) to Infestation (2010)
	Khurt Maier	1981–1982	drums	none
	Gene Hunter	1982	bass	none
	Bobby Blotzer	1982–1992; 1996–2014	drums; percussion	all Ratt releases from "Tell the World" (1982) to Infestation (2010)
	Juan Croucier	1982–1983; 1983–1992; 2012–2014; 2016–2022	bass; backing vocals	all Ratt releases from Ratt (1983) to Collage (1997)
	Marq Torien (Mark Maytorena)	1982	lead and rhythm guitar; backing vocals	none
	Joey Cristofanilli	1983	bass; backing vocals	none
	Michael Schenker	1991–1992 (substitute)	lead and rhythm guitar	none
	Robbie Crane	1996–2012	bass; backing vocals	Collage (1997); Ratt (1999); Infestation (2010)
	Keri Kelli (Kenneth Fear Jr.)	1999–2000	rhythm guitar; backing vocals	none
	John Corabi	2000–2008	rhythm guitar; backing vocals	none
	Jizzy Pearl (James Wilkinson)	2000–2006	lead vocals	none
	Carlos Cavazo	2008–2014; 2016–2018	lead and rhythm guitar; backing vocals	Infestation (2010)
	Jimmy DeGrasso	2014 (substitute); 2016–2018	drums	none
	Pete Holmes	2018–2022	drums	none
	Jordan Ziff	2018–2022	lead guitar; backing vocals	none
	Chris Sanders	2018–2020	rhythm guitar; backing vocals	none
	Frankie Lindia	2021–2022	rhythm guitar; backing vocals	none

=== Blotzer's Ratt members ===
Image	Name	Years active	Instruments
	Bobby Blotzer	2015–2017	drums; percussion
	Joshua Alan	2015–2017	lead vocals
	Michael "Doc" Ellis	2015–2016	rhythm guitar; backing vocals
	Nicholas "Blaze" Baum	2015–2016	lead guitar; backing vocals
	Scotty Griffin	2015–2016	bass; backing vocals
	Robbie Crane	2016	bass; backing vocals
	Stacey Blades (Bryan MaClachlan)	2016–2017	rhythm guitar; backing vocals
	Todd Kerns	2016 (substitute)	bass; backing vocals
	Mitch Perry	2016–2017	lead guitar; backing vocals
	Brad Lang	2016–2017	bass; backing vocals
	Seann Nicols	2017	lead vocals

== Lineups ==
Period	Members	Releases
1977 (Mickey Ratt)	Stephen Pearcy – lead vocals, rhythm guitar; Chris Hager – lead guitar; Tim Garcia – bass, backing vocals; Bob Eisenberg – drums	none
1977–1980 (Mickey Ratt)	Stephen Pearcy – lead vocals, rhythm guitar; Chris Hager – lead guitar; Tim Garcia – bass, backing vocals; John Turner – drums	"Drivin' on E" (1980)
1980 (Mickey Ratt)	Stephen Pearcy – lead vocals, guitar; Chris Hager – lead guitar; John Turner – drums; Dave Jellison – bass, backing vocals	none
1980–1981 (Mickey Ratt)	Stephen Pearcy – lead vocals, rhythm guitar; Chris Hager – lead guitar; John Turner – drums; Dave Jellison – bass, backing vocals	none
1981 (Mickey Ratt/M. Ratt/Ratt)	Stephen Pearcy – lead vocals; Jake E. Lee – lead guitar; Bob DeLellis – rhythm guitar; Matt Thorr – bass, backing vocals; Dave Alford – drums	none
1981–1982	Stephen Pearcy – lead vocals; Matt Thorr – bass, backing vocals; Warren DeMartini – lead and rhythm guitar, backing vocals; Robbin Crosby – lead and rhythm guitar, backing vocals; Khurt Maier – drums	"Tell the World" (1982)
1982	Stephen Pearcy – lead vocals; Warren DeMartini – lead and rhythm guitar, backing vocals; Robbin Crosby – lead and rhythm guitar, backing vocals; Khurt Maier – drums; Gene Hunter – bass	none
1982	Stephen Pearcy – lead vocals; Robbin Crosby – lead and rhythm guitar, backing vocals; Juan Croucier – bass, backing vocals; Bobby Blotzer – drums; Marq Torien – lead and rhythm guitar, backing vocals	none
1983	Stephen Pearcy – lead vocals; Robbin Crosby – lead and rhythm guitar, backing vocals; Bobby Blotzer – drums; Warren DeMartini – lead and rhythm guitar, backing vocals; Joey Cristofanilli – bass	Ratt (1983) – one track only
1982/1983–1991 (Classic lineup)	Stephen Pearcy – lead vocals; Robbin Crosby – lead and rhythm guitar, backing vocals; Bobby Blotzer – drums; Warren DeMartini – lead and rhythm guitar, backing vocals; Juan Croucier – bass, backing vocals	Ratt EP (1983); Out of the Cellar (1984); Invasion of Your Privacy (1985); Dancing Undercover (1986); Reach for the Sky (1988); Detonator (1990); Collage (1997) – three tracks only
1991–1992	Stephen Pearcy – lead vocals; Bobby Blotzer – drums; Warren DeMartini – lead and rhythm guitar, backing vocals; Juan Croucier – bass, backing vocals; Michael Schenker – lead and rhythm guitar (touring substitute)	none
Band inactive 1992–1996
1996 – early 1999	Stephen Pearcy – lead vocals, rhythm guitar; Bobby Blotzer – drums; Warren DeMartini – lead and rhythm guitar, backing vocals; Robbie Crane – bass, backing vocals	Collage (1997) – five tracks only; Ratt (1999)
Early 1999 – January 2000	Stephen Pearcy – lead vocals; Bobby Blotzer – drums; Warren DeMartini – lead guitar, backing vocals; Robbie Crane – bass, backing vocals; Keri Kelli – rhythm guitar, backing vocals	none
Early 2000 – December 2006	Bobby Blotzer – drums; Warren DeMartini – lead guitar, backing vocals; Robbie Crane – bass, backing vocals; Jizzy Pearl – lead vocals; John Corabi – rhythm guitar, backing vocals	none
April 2007 – August 2008	Bobby Blotzer – drums; Warren DeMartini – lead guitar, backing vocals; Robbie Crane – bass, backing vocals; John Corabi – rhythm guitar, backing vocals; Stephen Pearcy – lead vocals	none
August 2008 – March 2012	Bobby Blotzer – drums; Warren DeMartini – lead and rhythm guitar, backing vocals; Robbie Crane – bass, backing vocals; Stephen Pearcy – lead vocals; Carlos Cavazo – lead and rhythm rhythm guitar, backing vocals	Infestation (2010)
May 2012 – April 2014	Bobby Blotzer – drums; Warren DeMartini – lead and rhythm guitar, backing vocals; Stephen Pearcy – lead vocals; Carlos Cavazo – lead and rhythm guitar, backing vocals; Juan Croucier – bass, backing vocals	none
Band inactive 2014–2016
November 2016 – March 2018	Warren DeMartini – lead and rhythm guitar, backing vocals; Stephen Pearcy – lead vocals; Carlos Cavazo – lead and rhythm guitar, backing vocals; Juan Croucier – bass, backing vocals; Jimmy DeGrasso – drums	none
July 2018 - 2021	Stephen Pearcy – lead vocals; Juan Croucier – bass, backing vocals; Jordan Ziff – lead guitar, backing vocals; Pete Holmes – drums; Chris Sanders – rhythm guitar	none
2021-2022	Stephen Pearcy – lead vocals; Juan Croucier – bass, backing vocals; Jordan Ziff – lead guitar, backing vocals; Pete Holmes – drums; Frankie Lindia – rhythm guitar, backing vocals	none

== Bibliography ==
- Nalbandian, Bob (December 12, 2012), The Headbanger Issue #1, Saitama, Japan: Japanime, ISBN 978-4921205829
- Pearcy, Stephen; Benjamin, Sam (April 15, 2014), Sex, Drugs, Ratt & Roll: My Life in Rock, New York City, New York: Simon & Schuster, ISBN 978-1451694581
