= Tell the World: The Very Best of Ratt =

Greatest hits album by Ratt
- Released: August 21, 2007
- Recorded: 1983–1999
- Genre: Heavy metal, glam metal
- Label: Rhino/WEA

Ratt chronology
Ratt (1999)	Tell the World: The Very Best of Ratt (2007)	Infestation (2010)

Tell the World: The Very Best of Ratt is a career-spanning compilation album by American glam metal band Ratt. It features tracks from all 6 of the band's previous studio albums, including their quartet of consecutive platinum LPs from the mid-to-late-'80s (Out of the Cellar, Invasion of Your Privacy, Dancing Undercover, and Reach for the Sky), plus their 1990 album Detonator and their 1999 self-titled album, as well as a selection from their 1997 rarities compilation Collage, a favorite from their intimate 1990 MTV Unplugged live session, and their single from 1991's Point Break film soundtrack. Ironically, the title track for this compilation, ("Tell the World"), which originally appeared on the band's 1983 self-titled debut EP, is not actually included; in fact, no selection from the EP appears.

== Critical reception ==
Though the compilation sold well and had good reviews, the album has been criticized as missing more hits from Ratt, such as "You Think You're Tough" and "Givin' Yourself Away".

== Track listing ==
1. "Dangerous But Worth the Risk" from Invasion of Your Privacy
2. "Back for More" from Out of the Cellar
3. "Lovin' You's a Dirty Job" from Detonator
4. "Nobody Rides for Free" from the Point Break Soundtrack
5. "Heads I Win, Tails You Lose" from Detonator
6. "You're in Love" from Invasion of Your Privacy
7. "City to City" from Reach for the Sky
8. "Body Talk" from Dancing Undercover
9. "Way Cool Jr." from Reach for the Sky
10. "Round and Round" from Out of the Cellar
11. "Lay It Down" from Invasion of Your Privacy
12. "I Want a Woman" from Reach for the Sky
13. "Dance" from Dancing Undercover
14. "Wanted Man" from Out of the Cellar
15. "Slip of the Lip" from Dancing Undercover
16. "Shame Shame Shame" from Detonator
17. "Lack of Communication" from Out of the Cellar
18. "Over the Edge" from Ratt
19. "Steel River" from Collage
20. "Way Cool Jr." from MTV Unplugged
