= Ratt & Roll 81–91 =

Compilation album by Ratt
- Released: September 3, 1991
- Recorded: 1983–1991
- Genre: Glam metal
- Length: 1:17:23
- Label: Atlantic
- Producers: Beau Hill, Mike Stone, Sir Arthur Payson

Ratt chronology
Detonator (1990)	Ratt & Roll 81–91 (1991)	Collage (1997)

Professional ratings
Review scores
Source	Rating
AllMusic	4.5/5 stars
Collector's Guide to Heavy Metal	7/10
Metal Hammer	3/5 stars

Ratt & Roll 81–91 is a compilation album collecting the biggest hits and album cuts from 1983 to 1991 by American glam metal band Ratt. It charted at No. 57. Its sales had surpassed 700,000 when another compilation, The Essentials, was released.

== Track listing ==
No.	Title	Writer(s)	Original album	Length
1.	"Tell the World"	Robbin Crosby; Stephen Pearcy	Ratt	3:15
2.	"You Think You're Tough"	Robbin Crosby; Stephen Pearcy	Ratt	3:53
3.	"Round and Round"	Robbin Crosby; Stephen Pearcy; Warren DeMartini	Out of the Cellar	4:26
4.	"Wanted Man"	Robbin Crosby; Stephen Pearcy; Joey Cristofanilli	Out of the Cellar	3:41
5.	"Back for More" (Remake Version)	Robbin Crosby; Stephen Pearcy	Out of the Cellar	3:47
6.	"Lack of Communication"	Stephen Pearcy; Juan Croucier	Out of the Cellar	3:56
7.	"Lay It Down"	Robbin Crosby; Stephen Pearcy; Warren DeMartini; Juan Croucier	Invasion of Your Privacy	3:26
8.	"You're in Love"	Juan Croucier; Stephen Pearcy	Invasion of Your Privacy	3:14
9.	"Slip of the Lip"	Juan Croucier; Stephen Pearcy; Warren DeMartini	Dancing Undercover	3:18
10.	"Dance"	Robbin Crosby; Stephen Pearcy; Warren DeMartini; Beau Hill	Dancing Undercover	4:21
11.	"Body Talk"	Juan Croucier; Stephen Pearcy; Warren DeMartini	Dancing Undercover	3:49
12.	"Way Cool Jr."	Stephen Pearcy; Warren DeMartini; Beau Hill	Reach for the Sky	4:29
13.	"I Want a Woman"	Robbin Crosby; Stephen Pearcy; Juan Croucier; Beau Hill	Reach for the Sky	4:00
14.	"Lovin' You's a Dirty Job"	Juan Croucier; Stephen Pearcy; Warren DeMartini; Desmond Child	Detonator	3:18
15.	"Shame Shame Shame"	Stephen Pearcy; Warren DeMartini; Desmond Child	Detonator	5:29
16.	"Givin' Yourself Away"	Stephen Pearcy; Desmond Child; Diane Warren	Detonator	5:27
17.	"One Step Away"	Juan Croucier; Stephen Pearcy; Warren DeMartini; Desmond Child; Bobby Blotzer	Detonator	4:51
18.	"Heads I Win, Tails You Lose"	Stephen Pearcy; Warren DeMartini; Desmond Child	Detonator	4:01
19.	"Nobody Rides for Free"	Juan Croucier; Stephen Pearcy; Warren DeMartini; Steve Caton	Point Break Soundtrack	4:42
Total length:				1:17:23

== Charts ==
Chart (1991)	Peak position
Japanese Albums (Oricon)	10
US Billboard 200	57

== Certifications ==
Region	Certification	Certified units/sales
United States (RIAA)	Gold	500,000^{^}
^{^} Shipments figures based on certification alone.
