= Nobody Rides for Free =

"Nobody Rides For Free"

Single by Ratt

from the album Point Break (soundtrack)
- Released: 1991
- Recorded: 1991
- Genre: Glam metal
- Length: 4:42
- Label: Atlantic
- Songwriters: Steve Caton; Stephen Pearcy, Warren DeMartini, Juan Croucier
- Producer: Mick Guzawski

Ratt singles chronology
"Givin' Yourself Away" (1990)	"Nobody Rides For Free" (1991)	"Best of Me" (2010)

"Nobody Rides for Free" is a single by the American heavy metal band Ratt. It was originally taken from the Point Break soundtrack.

The song was written several years before its release by songwriter, Steve Caton, who performed it live many times in various Los Angeles and Hollywood clubs with his band Climate of Crisis. Later, after the song was presented to Ratt for the Point Break soundtrack, members Stephen Pearcy, Warren DeMartini, and Juan Croucier made their own changes to it by adding new verse music, a pre-chorus, a new chorus tag and also new lyrics, among other musical and melodic changes. This was Ratt's first single recorded without guitarist Robbin Crosby who left the band the year before due to his drug addiction. The song was played during the ending credits of the film.

== Music video ==
The music video for the song shows the band playing on a beach, intercut with some clips from the 1991 action-thriller Point Break. The band performed surrounded by fires (from the beach parties in the film) and huge towers with billowing parachute silk (to evoke the sky-diving sequences in the film). It was directed by Alan Carter and produced by Paul Flattery for FYI (Flattery Yukich Inc.).

== Personnel ==
- Stephen Pearcy – lead vocals
- Warren DeMartini – guitar
- Juan Croucier – bass, backing vocals
- Bobby Blotzer – drums
