= Tell the World =

Tell the World may refer to:

- Tell the World (Daniel DeBourg album), 2002
- Tell the World (Pandora album), 1995
- "Tell the World" (Pandora song), 1994
- Tell the World: The Very Best of Ratt, a 2007 career-spanning compilation album by Ratt
- "Tell the World", a song by Ratt from the EP Ratt
- Tell the World (Kristina Maria album), 2012
- "Tell the World", an episode of the 2017 Chinese animated TV series Stitch & Ai
- "Wheels", a hit released 1960 by the String-a-Longs, which they composed as "Tell the World"
