= Dance (Ratt song) =

Single by Ratt

from the album Dancing Undercover
- Released: October 1986
- Recorded: 1986
- Genre: Glam metal
- Length: 4:17
- Label: Atlantic
- Songwriters: Robbin Crosby, Stephen Pearcy, Warren DeMartini, Beau Hill
- Producer: Beau Hill

Ratt singles chronology
"What You Give Is What You Get" (1985)	"Dance" (1986)	"Slip of the Lip" (1986)

Music video
- "Dance" on YouTube

"Dance" is a song by American heavy metal band Ratt. It is the first track off their 1986 album Dancing Undercover and the tenth track of their compilation album Ratt & Roll 81–91. It reached number 59 on the Billboard Hot 100. The song was written by Stephen Pearcy, guitarists Robbin Crosby and Warren DeMartini, and album producer Beau Hill.

The single was featured in the Miami Vice season three episode "Down for the Count" in 1987.

== Music video ==
In the music video for the song, the band is invited to perform by the master of ceremonies (played by comedian and actor Dick Shawn) during a brief interlude at a rock music show at the famed Whisky a Go Go. Ratt is initially reluctant, but the band relents and performs.

== Track listing ==
1. "Dance" – 4:17
2. "Take a Chance" – 4:00

== Personnel ==
- Stephen Pearcy – vocals
- Warren DeMartini – co-lead guitar
- Robbin Crosby – co-lead guitar
- Juan Croucier – bass
- Bobby Blotzer – drums

== Charts ==
Chart (1986–1987)	Peak position
US Billboard Hot 100	59
US Mainstream Rock (Billboard)	36

== See also ==
- Ratt
- Dancing Undercover
