= You're in Love =

You're in Love may refer to:

- "You're in Love" (Ratt song)
- "You're in Love" (Wilson Phillips song)

== See also ==
- When You're in Love (disambiguation)
- You're in Love, Charlie Brown, an animated television special
- "You're in Love with a Psycho", 2017 song by band Kasabian
- "You Are in Love", a song by Taylor Swift
