= Infestation (album) =

Studio album by Ratt
- Released: April 20, 2010
- Recorded: 2008–2009
- Studio: Studio Barbarosa (Bavon, Virginia)
- Genres: Heavy metal; glam metal
- Length: 42:08
- Labels: Loud & Proud; Roadrunner
- Producer: Michael "Elvis" Baskette

Ratt chronology
| Tell the World: The Very Best of Ratt (2007) | Infestation (2010) |

Singles from Infestation
- 1. "Best of Me" Released: 2010; 2. "Eat Me Up Alive" Released: 2010

Professional ratings
Review scores
| Source | Rating |
|---|---|
| About.com | 4/5 stars |
| AllMusic | 2.5/5 stars |
| Blabbermouth.net | (8/10) |
| BW&BK | 9/10 stars |
| Exclaim! | (favorable) |
| MusicOMH | 4/5 stars |
| PopMatters | 7/10 stars |

Infestation is the seventh and final studio album by American glam metal band Ratt. It was released by Loud & Proud via Roadrunner Records, a then-sub-label of their longtime home Atlantic Records, on April 20, 2010. With the death of Robbin Crosby in 2002, guitar duty was taken over by Carlos Cavazo, formerly of Quiet Riot. The band would enter a turbulent period after the release of the album, and by 2018, all musicians had left except lead singer Stephen Pearcy.

In a February 17, 2010 interview with the Artisan News Service, Stephen Pearcy said of Infestation: "We wanted this to be like something that we would have written right after [1984's] Out of the Cellar. We definitely went back to basics with the mind set of a band with a lot of excitement and some great songs to get out."

In a March 18, 2010 interview with Metalholic Magazine, guitarist Warren DeMartini said of Infestation: "It really exceeded our expectations. Conceptually we kind of wanted to revisit the period of Out of the Cellar and Invasion of Your Privacy. We were sort of loosely trying to shoot for something that could fit between those two records. We were looking for more uptempo ideas and the double leads that Robbin Crosby and I started doing back in 1983."

== Release and commercial performance ==
The first single, "Best of Me" was released on February 2, 2010. It reached thirty-six on the Mainstream Rock Tracks in 2010. "Best of Me" was written by Stephen Pearcy, Carlos Cavazo, and Michael "Elvis" Baskette. When asked the meaning behind the lyrics in a December 30, 2009 interview, lead singer Stephen Pearcy said of "Best of Me": "This song was written for my wife (Melissa Pearcy). It's one of those where you always think the grass is greener on the other side, but in fact it isn't. I'm letting her know 'you're the best thing I got, but I had to go f--- around to figure it out.' It's one of those you don't know what you got till it's gone kind of things. With me, I go through this s--- every day. I'm married one day, then I'm not, but I am."

RATT's video for "Best of Me" was premiered worldwide March 22, 2010, on AOL. The video is a visual ode about today's 21st century mass media and information age overload mixed with unabridged live performance. The video also points to a bigger issue: younger kids on the outside looking in, trying to be part of the Ratt pack, and the overarching idea that infectious hooks can permeate all aspects of daily life. There's also family cameos, proving that not all relationships suffer because of rock 'n' roll. The video was released on March 29, 2010, on Metal Mania on VH1 Classic. The video directed by Andrew Bennett.

Infestation debuted at number 30 on the US Billboard Hot 100, selling around 14,000 copies. This makes it Ratt's highest-charting album since 1990. The album has since gone on to sell over 50,000 copies in the US.

== Track listing ==
| No. | Title | Writer(s) | Length |
|---|---|---|---|
| 1. | "Eat Me Up Alive" | Carlos Cavazo, Stephen Pearcy, Warren DeMartini | 4:13 |
| 2. | "Best of Me" | Cavazo, Pearcy, Michael "Elvis" Baskette | 4:19 |
| 3. | "A Little Too Much" | Baskette, Pearcy, DeMartini | 4:05 |
| 4. | "Look Out Below" | Bobby Blotzer, Pearcy, Baskette, | 3:44 |
| 5. | "Last Call" | DeMartini, Cavazo, Pearcy, Baskette, | 3:55 |
| 6. | "Lost Weekend" | Robbie Crane, Pearcy, Baskette | 3:46 |
| 7. | "As Good as It Gets" | Pearcy, Baskette, Cavazo | 4:38 |
| 8. | "Garden of Eden" | DeMartini, Pearcy | 3:03 |
| 9. | "Take a Big Bite" | DeMartini, Pearcy, Baskette | 2:46 |
| 10. | "Take Me Home" | Pearcy, DeMartini, Baskette | 4:23 |
| 11. | "Don't Let Go" | Blotzer, Pearcy, John Corabi, Baskette | 3:22 |

Japanese and iTunes special edition bonus track
| No. | Title | Writer(s) | Length |
|---|---|---|---|
| 12. | "Scatter" | DeMartini, Pearcy | 4:26 |

iTunes special edition bonus track
| No. | Title | Writer(s) | Length |
|---|---|---|---|
| 13. | "You Think You're Tough" (live from the Rockline Studio) | Pearcy, Robbin Crosby | 3:36 |
| 14. | "Tell the World" (live from the Rockline Studio) | Pearcy, Crosby | 3:14 |
| 15. | "Way Cool Jr." (live from the Rockline Studio) | DeMartini, Pearcy, Beau Hill | 4:16 |

== Personnel ==
=== Ratt ===
- Stephen Pearcy – lead vocals
- Warren DeMartini – guitar, backing vocals
- Carlos Cavazo – guitar, backing vocals
- Robbie Crane – bass
- Bobby Blotzer – drums

=== Production ===
- Michael "Elvis" Baskette – producer, mixing, strings arrangements
- Dave Holdredge – engineer, mixing, strings arrangements
- Jef Moll – digital editing
- Ted Jensen – mastering at Sterling Sound, New York City

== Charts ==
| Chart (2010) | Peak position |
|---|---|
| Finnish Albums (Suomen virallinen lista) | 49 |
| French Albums (SNEP) | 139 |
| Japanese Albums (Oricon) | 22 |
| Swiss Albums (Schweizer Hitparade) | 78 |
| UK Rock & Metal Albums (Official Charts) | 40 |
| US Billboard 200 | 30 |
| US Top Hard Rock Albums (Billboard) | 4 |
| US Indie Store Album Sales (Billboard) | 8 |
| US Top Rock Albums (Billboard) | 7 |
