= Lovin' You's a Dirty Job =

Single by Ratt

from the album Detonator
- Released: October 1990 (UK)
- Recorded: 1990
- Genre: Heavy metal; hard rock; glam metal
- Length: 3:14
- Label: Atlantic
- Songwriters: Stephen Pearcy; Juan Croucier; Desmond Child; Warren DeMartini
- Producer: Sir Arthur Payson

Ratt singles chronology
"Shame Shame Shame" (1990)	"Lovin' You's a Dirty Job" (1990)	"Givin' Yourself Away" (1991)

Music video
- "Lovin' You's a Dirty Job" on YouTube

"Lovin' You's a Dirty Job" is a single by the American heavy metal band Ratt. It was released as the first single from their 1990 album Detonator. The song was co-written by Ratt bassist Juan Croucier, guitarist Warren DeMartini, lead singer Stephen Pearcy and songwriter Desmond Child. The song is known for its anthemic chorus, and Pearcy's raspy vocals. The B-Side of the US single was "What's It Gonna Be", taken from their previous album Reach for the Sky. There was also a UK 12" which included a remix of "Lovin' You..." which was eventually included on Collage.

== Music video ==
In the music video for the song, the cliffhanger ending from "Shame Shame Shame" is resolved. The band performs on what appears to be another planet where the dueling airships from the previous video crashed and landed. They seduce the rival stripper-manned airship with their hot looks, musical abilities, and slick moves. It is implied that they all receive sexual favors from the strippers afterwards as a reward.

== Personnel ==
- Stephen Pearcy - vocals
- Warren DeMartini - co-lead guitar
- Robbin Crosby - co-lead guitar
- Juan Croucier- bass guitar
- Bobby Blotzer - drums

== Charts ==
Chart (1990)	Peak position
US Mainstream Rock (Billboard)	18
