= Marianne Gravatte =

American model and actress (born 1959)

Playboy centerfold appearance
- October 1982
- Preceded by: Connie Brighton
- Succeeded by: Marlene Janssen

Playboy Playmate of the Year
- 1983
- Preceded by: Shannon Tweed
- Succeeded by: Barbara Edwards

Personal details
- Born: December 13, 1959 (age 66) Hollywood, California
- Height: 5 ft 8 in (1.73 m)

Marianne Gravatte (born December 13, 1959, in Hollywood, California) is an American model and actress. She was named Playmate of the Month for October 1982, then later named as 1983's Playmate of the Year. Her original pictorial was photographed by Richard Fegley.

== Career ==
After being noticed in Playboy magazine by Ratt band member Stephen Pearcy, Gravatte appeared in the video as Stephen Pearcy's girlfriend for the band's song "Lay It Down". She was also featured on the front cover of the song's parent album, Invasion of Your Privacy, Ratt's second record, which was released in 1985.

She posed for Playboy again for the April 1994 Playmate Revisited feature.

== Personal life ==
From 1988 to 1990 Gravatte worked at the bar at the Out of Bounds Sports Bar in Huntington Beach, California with her husband, Mark E. Larsen. She is the mother of three sons.

== Filmography ==
- Mickey Spillane's Mike Hammer ... Brenda - in the episode "Dead Man's Run" (1984) .... Brenda
- Matt Houston - in the episode "The Bikini Murders" (1984)

=== Other appearances ===
- A cameo appearance in the music video "Something to Grab For" by Ric Ocasek (1983)
- A cameo appearance in the music video "No Tellin' Lies" by Zebra (1984)
- Appeared in Jocks Movie Poster (1987) Not in the movie.
- The June 1983 issue of Playboy featuring Gravatte as Playmate of the Year appears in episode 20 ("Everybody Hates Playboy") of the first season of Everybody Hates Chris.
- Guest on Late Night with David Letterman, 4/28/1983.

== Playboy appearances ==
- August 1982 "California Girls" - page 149
- October 1982 PMOM - page 108-119
- January 1983 "Dear Playboy" -page 18
- January 1983 "Playmate Review" - page 180
- January 1983 "Playmates' Progress" - page 189
- June 1983 "Playmate of the Year" - page 136–153, 162 (text)
- September 1983 "Dear Playboy" - page 15
- November 1983 Subscription Ad - page 24-25
- December 1983 "Giant Calendar Ad" - page 101
- May 1984 "World of Playboy" - page 13
- October 1984 "Stuck On Memphis" - page 125-127
- February 1985 "Next Month" - page 194
- March 1985 "Understudies" - page 120, 122, 124-125
- January 1986 "Potpourri" - page 246
- January 1994 "40 Memorable Years" - page 92
- April 1994 "Playmate Revisited" - page 74-77
- October 1996 Ad - page 165
- January 1997 "Video Ad" - page 38
- March 1997 "Glamourcon" - page 119
- January 2000 "Centerfolds of the Century" - page 120

=== NSS, books, and supplements ===
- 2nd 15 Years - page 103
- Girls of Summer 1983 - page 7, 29
- Girls of Summer 1984 - page 5–7, 56–57, 108-109
- Girls of Summer 1988 - page 107
- Girls of Summer 1989 - page 45
- Girls of Summer 1990 - page 53
- Girls of Winter 1984 - page 36–37, 66-67
- Girls of Winter 1988 - page 77, 91
- Women of Television 1984 - page 99
- Book of Lingerie #1 - page 1, 108, 109
- Book of Lingerie #2 - page 62–65, 96
- Book of Lingerie #3 - page 18–19, 48, 49
- Book of Lingerie #4 - page 102-103
- Book of Lingerie #5 - page 24, 91
- Book of Lingerie #6 - page 44, 45
- Book of Lingerie #8 - page 11, 29
- Book of Lingerie #10 - page 6
- Book of Lingerie #11 - page 43
- Book of Lingerie #74 - page 51
- Book of Lingerie #78 - page 82
- Blondes, Brunettes, & Redheads 1985 - page 44-47
- Blondes, Brunettes, & Redheads 1990 - page 27
- Bathing Beauties 1989 - page 68
- Sporting Women - page 30, 31
- Holiday Girls - page 14, 104-105
- Women On the Move - page 77
- Fantasies II - page 16-25
- Calendar Playmates - page 18, 27, 32
- Celebrating Centerfolds #1 - page 69
- Centerfolds Of The Century - page 61
- Facts & Figures - page 8, 47
- Midnight Playmates supplement - page 4, 14
- Nudes 1990 - page 54, 108
- Nudes 1991 - page 61
- Playmates in Paradise - page 58-61
- Playmates of the Year 1986 - page 94-99
- Playmates of the Year 2000 - page 48, 49
- Playmates of the Year 2013 - page 50, 51
- Photography - page 4-13 and cover
- Pocket Playmates #3 - page 5
- 21 Playmates II - page 78-81 and cover
- Wet & Wild Women 1987 - page 26, 27
- Wet & Wild Playmates 1994 - page 70
- Sexy, Sassy & Sophisticated - page 20, 78-79
- Playmate Book 50 - page 242–243, 262, 263
- Playboy Book 50 - page 263

=== Foreign Playboy ===
- Japan September 1982 "California Girls" - page 193
- Spain October 1982 PMOM - page 52-63
- France October 1982 PMOM - page 56-67
- Netherlands October 1982 PMOM - page 69-79
- Japan November 1982 PMOM - page 129-141
- Australia December 1982 PMOM - page 7, 76-87
- Italy January 1983 PMOM - page 58-69
- Italy June 1983 "La Playmate Dell Anno" - page 100-111
- France June 1983 "La Victoire de Marianne" - page 28-37
- Mexico June 1983 "Playmate del Ano" - page 62-71
- Japan July 1983 "Playboy People" - page 9
- Japan July 1983 "Playmate of the Year" - page 78-85
- Netherlands July 1983 "Playmate of the Year" - page 99-101
- Spain July 1983
- Australia August 1983 "US Playmate of the Year" - page 84-91
- Spain October 1983 "La Playmates Del Ano" - page 70-77
- Australia April 1985 "Undercover" 134-137
- Japan May 1985 "Understudies" - page 167, 169, 170-171
- Argentina October 1985 PMOM - page 152-163
- Australia October 1985 "Subscription Ad"
- Greece April 1986 "Playmate Review" - page 96, 98
- Turkey April 1986 PMOM - page 59-71
- Turkey July 1986 "Subscription Ad" - page 26-27
- Turkey March 1987 "Subscription Ad" - page 114-115
- Hong Kong April 1988 PMOM - page 88-102
- Turkey January 1989 - page 75
- Italy July 1994
- Turkey September 1994 "Playmate Revisited" - page 112-115
- Australia January 1995 "Playmate Revisited"
- Japan May 1999 "Best of Playmates 1960-1998" - page 67
- Croatia February 2001
- Italy June 2002 "Le Grandi Playmates Del Passato - page 100-104
- Netherlands May 2011 "Retro Bloot" - page 32
- Croatia October 2016 "Flashback" - page 136

== See also ==
- List of people in Playboy 1980–1989

Kimberly McArthur	Anne-Marie Fox	Karen Witter	Linda Rhys Vaughn	Kym Malin	Lourdes Estores
Lynda Wiesmeier	Cathy St. George	Connie Brighton	Marianne Gravatte	Marlene Janssen	Charlotte Kemp
