= Joey Cristofanilli =

- Genres: Glam metal
- Instrument: Bass

Joey Cristofanilli is a bassist who played in the bands Magic, Rough Cutt, Ratt, Jag Wire and Radio 9.

== Biography ==
With the bands Magic and Rough Cutt, he was bandmates with keyboardist Claude Schnell, who later became famous for playing keyboards in the band Dio.

After Rough Cutt, he played in the band Ratt.

With Ratt, he filled in for Juan Croucier, who briefly went back to Dokken after joining Ratt. In addition to playing on the version of "You're In Trouble" that was a bonus track on some copies of the Ratt EP, he also co-wrote "Wanted Man" on Out of the Cellar.

After Ratt, he played in the band Jag Wire. He currently plays for the band Radio 9 with his wife Patsy Silver as lead singer. They reside in Buffalo, NY.

== Discography ==
=== With Rough Cutt ===
- "A Little Kindness" and "Used And Abused" (1981)

=== With Ratt ===
- "You're In Trouble" (bonus track on some copies of the Ratt EP) (1983)

=== With Jag Wire ===
- Made In Heaven (1985)

=== With Radio 9 ===
- Radio 9 (2017)
