= Way Cool Jr. =

Single by Ratt

from the album Reach for the Sky
- Released: December 1988
- Recorded: 1988
- Length: 4:27
- Label: Atlantic
- Songwriters: Stephen Pearcy, Beau Hill, Warren DeMartini.
- Producer: Beau Hill

Ratt singles chronology
"I Want a Woman" (1989)	"Way Cool Jr." (1988)	"Shame Shame Shame" (1990)

Music video
- "Way Cool Jr." on YouTube

"Way Cool Jr." is a single by the American heavy metal band Ratt. It is the third track on their 1988 album, Reach for the Sky. It reached number 75 on the Billboard Hot 100.

== Track listing ==
1. "Way Cool Jr." - 4:27
2. "Chain Reaction" - 3:42

== Personnel ==
- Stephen Pearcy – vocals
- Warren DeMartini – co-lead guitar
- Robbin Crosby – co-lead guitar
- Juan Croucier – bass guitar
- Bobby Blotzer – drums, washboard, harmonica

== Charts ==
Chart (1989)	Peak position
US Billboard Hot 100	75
US Mainstream Rock (Billboard)	16
