= Ratt (album) =

Studio album by Ratt
- Released: July 6, 1999
- Recorded: 1998–1999
- Studio: Rumbo, Los Angeles
- Genre: Hard rock
- Length: 50:42
- Label: Portrait
- Producer: Richie Zito

Ratt chronology
Collage (1997)	Ratt (1999)	Tell the World: The Very Best of Ratt (2007)

Professional ratings
Review scores
Source	Rating
AllMusic	2/5 stars
Collector's Guide to Heavy Metal	8/10
Kerrang!	4/5 stars

Ratt is the sixth studio album by American glam metal band Ratt. Often referred to as "1999" by fans (partially to avoid confusion with their EP, which was also self-titled), the album saw the band's musical direction shift to a more blues-influenced hard rock sound and further away from their previous glam metal roots. This is the first studio album to feature bassist Robbie Crane.

== Track listing ==
No.	Title	Writer(s)	Length
1.	"Over the Edge"	Todd Jeremias, Stephen Pearcy, Warren DeMartini	4:22
2.	"Live for Today"	Bobby Blotzer, Pearcy, DeMartini, Jack Russell	4:38
3.	"Gave Up Givin' Up"	DeMartini, Pearcy, Marti Frederiksen	4:04
4.	"We Don't Belong"	DeMartini, Pearcy, Frederiksen	6:11
5.	"Breakout"	Blotzer, Pearcy, DeMartini, Russell	4:24
6.	"Tug of War"	DeMartini, Pearcy, Taylor Rhodes	4:17
7.	"Dead Reckoning"	DeMartini, Pearcy, Jack Blades	4:32
8.	"Luv Sick"	DeMartini, Pearcy, Rhodes	5:09
9.	"It Ain't Easy"	Pearcy, DeMartini, Rhodes, Richie Zito	4:02
10.	"All the Way"	Pearcy, DeMartini, Mark Hudson, Steve Dudas	4:41
11.	"So Good, So Fine"	DeMartini, Pearcy	4:22

== Personnel ==
Ratt

- Stephen Pearcy – lead vocals
- Warren DeMartini – guitars, backing vocals
- Robbie Crane – bass guitar, backing vocals
- Bobby Blotzer – drums

Production

- Richie Zito – producer
- Noel Golden, Shawn Berman – engineers
- Dave Dominguez, Posie Mulaid, Kenny Ybarra – assistant engineers
- Rob Jacobs – mixing
- Mike Shipley – mixing of "Over the Edge"
- Dave Donnelly – mastering
- John Kalodner – A&R

== Charts ==
Chart (1999)	Peak position
US Billboard 200	169
