= When You're in Love =

When You're in Love may refer to:

- When You're in Love (album), a 1995 album by Murray Head
- When You're in Love (film), a 1937 musical film starring Grace Moore and Cary Grant
- "When You're in Love", a song from the 1954 musical film Seven Brides for Seven Brothers

== See also ==
- "When You're in Love with a Beautiful Woman", a 1979 song by Dr. Hook and the Medicine Show
