= You're in Love (Ratt song) =

Single by Ratt

from the album Invasion of Your Privacy
- Released: September 1985 (US)
- Recorded: 1985
- Genre: Glam metal
- Length: 3:12
- Label: Atlantic
- Songwriters: Juan Croucier, Stephen Pearcy
- Producer: Beau Hill

Ratt singles chronology
| "Lay It Down" (1985) | "You're in Love" (1985) | "What You Give Is What You Get" (1985) |

Music video
- "You're in Love" on YouTube

"You're in Love" is a song by the American heavy metal band Ratt. It is the first track on the group's 1985 album Invasion of Your Privacy, and the second single released from the record by Atlantic Records.

== Background ==
"You're in Love" was co-written by Ratt bassist Juan Croucier and lead singer Stephen Pearcy.

Pearcy said, "'You're In Love' – I call it our 'love song,' but it's not. At all. It's kind of a "danger zone" love scenario". He added that the song highlights the band's "tongue-in-cheek, poke-at-ya, try-and-figure-it-out kind of lyrics" style.

Featured on season two episode nine: "Flashback" of the Freeform series, Alone Together.

== Music video ==
The music video for the track features several love scene clips from classic movies and cartoons. The beginning of the video shows a clip from the movie Santa Fe Trail. Additionally, the video includes a scene where guitarist Robbin Crosby catches an undergarment from a female audience member after she throws it on stage.

The concert footage in the video was shot on Friday, August 9, 1985, at the Mississippi Gulf Coast Coliseum in Biloxi, and on Saturday, August 10, 1985 at the Hirsch Memorial Coliseum in Shreveport, Louisiana.

== Reception ==
The song hit No. 89 on the Billboard Hot 100 and No. 34 on the Billboard Top Rock Tracks chart.

== Track listing ==
1. "You're in Love" – 3:12
2. "Between the Eyes" – 3:54

== Personnel ==
- Stephen Pearcy – lead vocals
- Warren DeMartini – co-lead guitar
- Robbin Crosby – co-lead guitar
- Juan Croucier – bass guitar
- Bobby Blotzer – drums

== Charts ==
| Chart (1985–1986) | Peak position |
|---|---|
| Canada Top Singles (RPM) | 67 |
| UK Singles (Official Charts) | 82 |
| US Billboard Hot 100 | 89 |
| US Mainstream Rock (Billboard) | 34 |
