= Lay It Down (Ratt song) =

Single by Ratt

from the album Invasion of Your Privacy
- Released: June 1985 (US)
- Recorded: 1985
- Genre: Heavy metal; glam metal
- Length: 3:23
- Label: Atlantic
- Songwriters: Stephen Pearcy, Juan Croucier, Robbin Crosby, Warren DeMartini
- Producer: Beau Hill

Ratt singles chronology
"Lack of Communication" (1984)	"Lay It Down" (1985)	"You're in Love" (1985)

Music video
- "Lay It Down" on YouTube

"Lay It Down" is a single by American glam metal band Ratt. It was the first single released to promote the group's second album, Invasion of Your Privacy.

== Background ==
The song was co-written by Ratt vocalist Stephen Pearcy, bassist Juan Croucier, and guitarists Robbin Crosby and Warren DeMartini. It was demoed while the band was in Hawaii on vacation from their "Out of the Cellar" tour.

Singer Stephen Pearcy said, "It's a Warren-instigated riff. I believe when he brought that riff in, it was all over with. It was just – bam! – strong from the start. The lyrics on that, it could be about anyone calling somebody out, saying, 'Hey, you know you want to lay it down, you know you want to get it on.'"

== Music video ==
The music video shows lead singer Stephen Pearcy as a child (played by Whit Hertford) having a birthday party with a young girl sitting next to him. After he makes his birthday wish and blows out the candles, he sees a vision of the future in which his grown-up self and his band plays in what looks like an abandoned building. He sings to his now grown-up girlfriend to win her heart. The video ends with the girl asking him what he wished for.

The woman in the video is Playboy model Marianne Gravatte, who is also the model on the cover of Invasion Of Your Privacy.

== Reception ==
"Lay It Down" reached No. 40 on the Billboard Hot 100 and No. 11 on the Mainstream Rock chart during the summer of 1985. This made it Ratt's second and last Top 40 Pop hit.

It appears in the video game Brütal Legend, during the third battle against Lyonwhyte.

== Track listing ==
1. "Lay It Down" – 3:23
2. "Got Me On the Line" – 3:04

== Personnel ==
- Stephen Pearcy – Lead vocals
- Warren DeMartini – Lead guitar
- Robbin Crosby – Lead guitar
- Juan Croucier – Bass guitar
- Bobby Blotzer – Drums

== Charts ==
Chart (1985)	Peak position
UK Singles (Official Charts)	77
US Billboard Hot 100	40
US Mainstream Rock (Billboard)	11
