= Collage (Ratt album) =

Compilation album by Ratt
- Released: July 22, 1997
- Recorded: 1982–1997
- Studio: The Office (Van Nuys, California); Silver Cloud (Burbank, California) (tracks 5, 7, 8), Music Grinder (Hollywood, California) (track 10)
- Genre: Heavy metal, glam metal
- Length: 39:19
- Label: DeRock (US); Victor (Japan)
- Producer: Warren DeMartini, Stephen Pearcy

Ratt chronology
Ratt & Roll 81–91 (1991)	Collage (1997)	Ratt (1999)

Professional ratings
Review scores
Source	Rating
AllMusic	2.5/5 stars
Collector's Guide to Heavy Metal	9/10

Collage is a compilation album by American glam metal band Ratt. It consists of alternate recordings, B-sides, and versions of songs from the band's Mickey Ratt period. It was mostly recorded and released in 1997, concurrently with Ratt's reunion tour, so that they would have a new album to promote. In 1998, the band would sign a new major label deal with Sony.

The track "Mother Blues" first appeared as an Arcade song on their 1993 self-titled release, but was originally a Ratt demo, ending up on Collage. "Steel River" is an alternate version of the Mickey Ratt song "Railbreak".

== Track listing ==
No.	Title	Writer(s)	Length
1.	"Steel River" (B-side, 'Hold Tight' (CD, Single, Promo), 1997)	Stephen Pearcy, Warren DeMartini	4:19
2.	"Dr. Rock" ('Mickey Ratt')	Pearcy, John Turner (1978)	3:51 al
3.	"Diamond Time Again"	Pearcy, DeMartini	3:39
4.	"Ratt Madness"	Pearcy (1977)	2:31
5.	"Hold Tight"	Pearcy, DeMartini	4:21
6.	"I Want It All"	Robbin Crosby, Pearcy	3:52
7.	"Mother Blues" ('Stephen Pearcy' band "Arcade", first album, 1992)	Pearcy	3:01
8.	"Top Secret"	Pearcy (1977)	4:41
9.	"Take It Anyway"	Pearcy (1977)	2:33
10.	"Lovin' You..." (Fonic Mix LP Version)	Pearcy, DeMartini, Juan Croucier, Desmond Child	6:31

Japanese edition bonus track
No.	Title	Writer(s)	Length
11.	"She's Got Everything"	Pearcy, DeMartini	4:00

== Personnel ==
Ratt

- Stephen Pearcy – lead vocals, rhythm guitar (tracks 1, 2, 4, 8, 9) producer
- Warren DeMartini – lead and rhythm guitar, acoustic guitar, dobro (track 1), slide guitar (track 6), backing vocals, producer
- Bobby Blotzer – drums, percussion
- Robbie Crane – bass guitar
- Robbin Crosby – rhythm guitars on tracks 6, 8, 10
- Juan Croucier – bass on tracks 3, 5, 8, 10

Additional musicians

- Billy Sherwood – bass on track 6

Production

- Billy Sherwood – engineer
- Joe Floyd, Sean Kenesie – engineers on tracks 5, 7, 8
- Sir Arthur Payson, Steve Heinke – engineers on track 10
- Joe Gastwirt – mastering
