= Dancing Undercover =

Studio album by Ratt
- Released: September 24, 1986
- Studios: Village Recorder, Los Angeles, California
- Genre: Glam metal
- Length: 34:55
- Label: Atlantic
- Producer: Beau Hill

Ratt chronology
Invasion of Your Privacy (1985)	Dancing Undercover (1986)	Reach for the Sky (1988)

Singles from Dancing Undercover
- 1. "Dance" Released: October 1986; 2. "Body Talk" Released: January 1987 (Japan)

Professional ratings
Review scores
Source	Rating
AllMusic	3/5 stars
Collector's Guide to Heavy Metal	8/10
Metal Hammer	4/7

Dancing Undercover is the third studio album by American glam metal band Ratt, released in 1986. The album was produced by Beau Hill and contains the hit single/video "Dance", which appeared in the Miami Vice episode "Down for the Count". Two other videos were made: "Body Talk", which was used on the soundtrack for the Eddie Murphy film The Golden Child, and "Slip of the Lip". It charted at No. 26 on the Billboard 200 chart and at No. 14 on Rolling Stone's Album Chart. The album went platinum.

== Music and release ==
The second single, "Body Talk", was released in January 1987 in Japan. The song was written by Pearcy, Croucier, and DeMartini. Ratt's guitarist Warren DeMartini had the song's opening riffs for years. However, no one was able to develop it into a song. Under a very tight deadline (one day to be exact), Ratt bassist Juan Croucier stepped in. He wrote all the vocal melodies and lyrics, adding additional chord progressions to the one riff that had been around for years. The song title was apparently conceived of by Ratt producer Beau Hill or vocalist Stephen Pearcy. It was featured on the compilation album Ratt & Roll 81-91. It was also used as a soundtrack for Eddie Murphy's film The Golden Child. The video was added on MTV in late '86, while "Dance" was still in heavy rotation.

== Tour ==
Ratt's opening acts on the tour in support of the album included Poison, Cinderella, Cheap Trick, Queensrÿche, and Vinnie Vincent Invasion. Poison were kicked off as an opening act for Ratt, due to tensions with some of the members, which led to Queensrÿche replacing them for a few weeks. However, ticket sales dropped once Queensrÿche replaced Poison, with Poison eventually returning as an opening act. In a June 2001 interview, guitarist Robbin Crosby reflected on Queensrÿche being an opening act for Ratt, saying, "it was just a bad mix. Because we were like a party band, and they were like a dark thing. I liked them personally, [but] it just wasn't a good mix."

== Track listing ==
Side one
No.	Title	Writer(s)	Length
1.	"Dance"	Robbin Crosby; Stephen Pearcy; Warren DeMartini; Beau Hill	4:17
2.	"One Good Lover"	Crosby; Pearcy	3:06
3.	"Drive Me Crazy"	Crosby; Pearcy; DeMartini; Bobby Blotzer	3:42
4.	"Slip of the Lip"	DeMartini; Juan Croucier; Pearcy	3:15
5.	"Body Talk"	Crosby; Croucier; Pearcy	3:44

Side two
No.	Title	Writer(s)	Length
6.	"Looking for Love"	Crosby; Croucier; Pearcy	3:09
7.	"7th Avenue"	DeMartini; Croucier; Pearcy	3:11
8.	"It Doesn't Matter"	Croucier; Pearcy	3:08
9.	"Take a Chance"	DeMartini; Croucier; Pearcy	4:00
10.	"Enough Is Enough"	DeMartini; Crosby; Croucier; Pearcy	3:23
Total length:			34:55

Early pressings of the CD had "Slip of the Lip" and "Body Talk" errantly mastered into one track as track 4.

== Personnel ==
Ratt

- Stephen Pearcy – lead vocals
- Robbin Crosby – lead guitar, backing vocals
- Warren DeMartini – lead guitar, backing vocals
- Juan Croucier – bass, backing vocals
- Bobby Blotzer – drums, percussion

Production

- Beau Hill – producer, engineer
- Michael O'Reilly, Jim Faraci – engineers
- Jimmy Hoyson – assistant engineer
- Stephen Benben – digital editing and sequencing
- Ted Jensen – mastering at Sterling Sound, New York City

== Charts ==
Chart (1986–87)	Peak position
Canada Top Albums/CDs (RPM)	49
Finnish Albums (The Official Finnish Charts)	17
Swedish Albums (Sverigetopplistan)	23
UK Albums (Official Charts)	51
US Billboard 200	26

== Certifications ==
Region	Certification	Certified units/sales
Canada (Music Canada)	Gold	50,000^{^}
Japan (RIAJ)	Gold	100,000^{^}
United States (RIAA)	Platinum	1,000,000^{^}
^{^} Shipments figures based on certification alone.
