= Robbin Crosby =

American guitarist (1959–2002)

- Crosby in the music video for Ratt's "Wanted Man" (1985)

Background information
- Also known as: King
- Born: Robbinson Lantz Crosby; August 4, 1959; La Jolla, California, U.S.
- Died: June 6, 2002 (aged 42) Los Angeles, California, U.S.
- Genres: Heavy metal, hard rock, glam metal
- Occupations: Musician, songwriter
- Instrument: Guitar
- Years active: 1977–c. 2002
- Formerly of: Ratt, Secret Service, MacMeda, Metropolis, Phenomenon

Robbinson Lantz Crosby (August 4, 1959 – June 6, 2002) was an American guitarist who was a member of glam metal band Ratt, earning several platinum albums in the US in the 1980s. Crosby died in 2002 from complications from AIDS subsequent to a heroin overdose.

== Early life ==
Crosby was born in La Jolla, California, and had two sisters, Ristin and Bronle. His father, Harry W. Crosby, was a high school science teacher who later became a professional photographer. Robbin attended Bird Rock Elementary, Muirlands Junior High and La Jolla High School, graduating in June 1976. He previously played baseball prior to shifting his focus to the guitar.

== Career ==
=== Before Ratt ===
In the late 1970s, Crosby played in several San Diego bands. From 1977–78 he played in Phenomenon, recording a single "The Final Word," which was written by Crosby. It was released in 1980. Phenomenon also featured future Warrior member Parramore McCarty. While playing with Phenomenon, he took lessons from Thom Beebe, described as "a monster player in the Blackmore vein." After Phenomenon folded, Crosby and the drummer from Phenomenon began playing with Metropolis from 1978–1979, playing popular Judas Priest and Robin Trower songs on the La Jolla Beach Circuit. Metropolis didn't last long, and, in 1979, Crosby teamed up with former members of Phenomenon and Metropolis to create a new band, Secret Service. Crosby moved to Manhattan Beach, California, in 1979, living with his girlfriend Tawny Kitaen. The band was short lived and, in 1980, Crosby was in a band Aircraft. The same year he also recorded a live demo with the band Aircraft, which also featured Rob Lamothe, later in Riverdogs with Dio/Whitesnake/Def Leppard guitarist Vivian Campbell. In 1981, Aircraft changed its name to Mac Meda, which Crosby's brother-in-law managed. They recorded six songs on Vulture record label sometime in 1981, but the songs didn't help them launch a career. However, the move to the Los Angeles area provided Mac Meda with access to a vibrant club scene, which they soon became a part of, even playing the famed Troubadour (West Hollywood, California) on May 7, 1981.

=== With Ratt ===
Crosby was a member of the San Diego rock band Mickey Ratt, later to be rechristened simply Ratt. He would end up co-writing many of Ratt's songs, including "Round and Round", "Wanted Man" and "Lay It Down". The album Out of the Cellar went to triple platinum based on "Round and Round".

Crosby was dating actress Tawny Kitaen at the time he joined Ratt, and she appears on the album covers of both the Ratt EP (1983) and Out of the Cellar (1984). Crosby and Kitaen broke up in 1984 after a six-year relationship.

In the coming years, Crosby would buy a home in the Hollywood Hills of Los Angeles. In 1986, he started dating Playboy Playmate Laurie Carr, with the two later marrying in 1987. Mötley Crüe bassist Nikki Sixx was meant to be the best man at Crosby's wedding, but Sixx didn't turn up since the event would have alcohol, and he was trying to get clean from drugs. Sixx not turning up to the wedding upset Crosby, and the two didn't speak for years afterwards. Crosby and Carr divorced in 1991 and had no children.

Crosby's solos were blues-based, as he drew inspiration from Jimi Hendrix, which gave Ratt melodic flavors. His style was at odds with shredding style of fellow Ratt guitarist Warren DeMartini, but their two styles also complemented each other, differentiating Ratt from other west coast glam metal bands. Feeling "overshadowed" by DeMartini, Crosby began "self-medicating with drugs and alcohol," which led to a crippling heroin addiction. A reason Crosby started taking heroin was since it didn't have the same hangovers associated with alcohol. Crosby remembered that he felt like he would never end up becoming an addict when he started taking heroin, saying in 1999, "you hear how people go through [addictions] or what it does to people. And I just [thought] 'it'll never happen to me', you know, I was different, I was special, and that'll never happen. Well it did, in a big way." It took a long period of time for all his Ratt bandmates to find out about his addiction. Drummer Bobby Blotzer said he learned about Crosby's heroin addiction during an important legal meeting between the members, where Crosby was sleepy due to the heroin. During this meeting, singer Stephen Pearcy whispered to the other members that Crosby was behaving like this since he was on heroin. Pearcy remembered that they later started finding guns and heroin needles after doing music videos, while Blotzer said "we were scared, and sad".

As Ratt stepped in the studio to record their album Detonator in 1990, Crosby entered rehab. According to Crosby's brother-in-law, the guitarist was also addicted to cocaine and "other stuff" and was repeatedly in and out of rehab. Crosby still appeared on Detonator despite his time in rehab. During his Detonator rehab stint, Crosby was upset that his Ratt bandmates didn't bother to visit him, despite living near the clinic in Los Angeles. The only visit was one with DeMartini and Detonator producer/songwriter Desmond Child, who was hired in an effort for the band to have more mainstream hits. Crosby felt as though this was a forced meeting rather than a genuine one, since he did not get along with Child. Rather than going in a poppy direction by hiring Child, Crosby had wanted the band to go in a heavier direction on Detonator, by having a sound similar to their 1983 self-titled EP. Crosby said he had always liked heavier music than the band ever ended up playing. He added that by the time they recorded Detonator, he already believed the "writing was on the wall" for the mainstream glam metal sound the band had become known for, due to the rise of bands such as Metallica.

Following Detonator's August 1990 release, Crosby joined Ratt on tour. The tour lasted until late 1991, with the band subsequently breaking up in February 1992. Crosby left in the middle of the tour due to his addiction struggles. During Crosby's last show at Tokyo's Nakano Sunplaza in February 1991, his playing was impaired by his drug use. In the middle of the show when Crosby had to switch guitars, he accidentally picked a wrong, out of tune guitar, continuing to play despite its poor sound. This led to his bandmates and the entire audience all looking towards Crosby at one point in the concert. For the rest of the tour, Crosby was replaced by Michael Schenker of German band Scorpions.

=== After Ratt ===
Crosby eventually left Ratt in 1991. Prior to leaving, Crosby worked as a producer for metal band Lillian Axe. Crosby later said he felt secure leaving Ratt, since their manager at the time was promising to help him become a record producer. Crosby ended up facing financial hardship due to his drug addictions and his career as a producer not panning out. Crosby also did not earn any money when his old house with ex-wife Laurie Carr was sold. Crosby described feeling lonely and isolated during this period, since his ex-bandmates shunned him and refused to financially support him, believing he would use any money they gave him for heroin. Crosby only got financial support from his Ratt bandmates once they found out he had become HIV-positive from the heroin use, although Crosby said all he got was $100 from Pearcy. At one point, Crosby was given roughly $100 from Ratt's ex-photographer Neil Zlozower, after Crosby came to him crying, barefoot and with sores on his feet and hands, with Zlozower feeling sorry for him. Crosby said that his closest friend during this time was a black Labrador dog. Crosby had the dog for 11 years, but it ended up being stolen from him, with Crosby describing this as being a devastating event for him.

In a June 1999 interview for a Ratt episode of VH1's Behind the Music, Crosby talked about how drug addiction and his HIV status changed his life. "What has drug addiction done for me?" he asked. "It's cost me my career, my fortune [and] basically my sex life when I found out I was HIV positive." The Behind the Music episode didn't air until 2006, due to undisclosed legal issues, and Crosby remained out of the media spotlight throughout the 1990s.

In 2001, Crosby publicly stated that he had AIDS and had been HIV-positive since 1994. Crosby theorized that he contracted the disease from a dirty heroin needle, and disclosed in 2001 that he initially attempted suicide after the diagnosis. He had also been in and out of the hospital for eight years dealing with back problems and health issues associated with HIV. Crosby put on a significant amount of weight, due to digestive issues rather than excessive eating. To occupy his time he became a Little League coach, and also worked on a guitar fan/collector project, which was to create a limited-edition run of Jackson King V "Big Red" replica guitars. Beginning in early 2001, Crosby spent several months in end of life hospice care, due to health issues, and said in 2001 that his AIDS condition was terminal and "killing" him. In 2020, Tawny Kitaen described this facility as a "retirement home" and said Crosby was put there since the beds at Cedars-Sinai Medical Center could not accommodate his large size. On June 18, 2001, Crosby had an MRI scan at the facility, which helped determine roughly how long he had to live.

Crosby attempted various musical projects, first (post-Ratt) re-uniting with Perry McCarty, Krys Baratto, Dino Guerrero and Mark Lewis as an updated version of Secret Service, a moniker used by McCarty and Crosby previously for their pre-Ratt San Diego band. Later moving to El Paso, Texas in 1996, he briefly played with the Country/Western group War Party. One of his last projects was with ex-Ratt bassist Juan Croucier in the early 2000s, with Croucier being the member of the band Crosby had the most contact with since leaving. Crosby auditioned to rejoin Ratt when they discussed reuniting in late 1996, and moved back to California from El Paso in order to do so. Crosby had to sell all of his possessions to finance the move. He was rejected due to not being as technically proficient as he used to be. Croucier was also not part of the reunion due to tensions with other members. Crosby contributed to some of the tracks on Ratt's 1997 release Collage, which was a mix of rarities and new recordings. Regarding Crosby's reasons for wanting to rejoin, Croucier told Behind the Music, "all Robbin wanted to do was redeem himself. He wanted that more than anything in the world." Crosby himself stated in 2001 that he wanted to keep playing music since "that says 'hey you know, this guy didn't just fall off the face of the earth and is just a big fat junkie'." In June 1997, Ratt began playing their first live shows since September 1991, as a four-piece rather than a five-piece. The band had just a single guitarist rather than two, and ex-Vince Neil bassist Robbie Crane replaced Croucier. In 2001, Crosby said he hadn't heard Collage, or Ratt's 1999 self-titled album, which was their first entirely new studio album since Detonator. He also said that he disagreed with the other members still calling the project Ratt while not having the original lineup, believing they could have been more successful under a new name rather than the Ratt name.

== Death ==
Crosby died on June 6, 2002, from complications from AIDS subsequent to a heroin overdose. By the beginning of 2002, Crosby had been clean for nearly two years, but in May 2002 had moved in with an old friend of his who he used to take heroin with.

According to an autopsy report after his death, Crosby was 6 ft 5 in (1.96 m) and weighed 400 pounds (180 kg).

== Discography ==
=== With Ratt ===
- Ratt EP (1983)
- Out of the Cellar (1984)
- Invasion of Your Privacy (1985)
- Dancing Undercover (1986)
- Reach for the Sky (1988)
- Detonator (1990)
- Collage (1997)

==== Greatest hits albums ====
- Ratt & Roll 81-91 (1991)
- Metal Hits (2003)
- Tell the World: The Very Best of Ratt (2007)

=== With Jon Bon Jovi ===
- Blaze of Glory (1990)

=== With Rumbledog ===
- Rumbledog (1993)
