= Reach for the Sky (Ratt album) =

Studio album by Ratt
- Released: October 24, 1988
- Recorded: 1988
- Studios: A&M, Hollywood; Record Plant, Los Angeles; The Enterprise, Burbank
- Genre: Glam metal
- Length: 39:25
- Label: Atlantic
- Producers: Beau Hill, Mike Stone

Ratt chronology
Dancing Undercover (1986)	Reach for the Sky (1988)	Detonator (1990)

Singles from Reach for the Sky
- 1. "Way Cool Jr." Released: December 1988; 2. "I Want a Woman" Released: 1989

Professional ratings
Review scores
Source	Rating
AllMusic	2.5/5 stars
Collector's Guide to Heavy Metal	7/10

Reach for the Sky is the fourth studio album by American glam metal band Ratt, released in 1988 by Atlantic Records. Despite the album title, the band's song "Reach for the Sky" does not appear on this album.

== Background ==
Though it sold well enough to achieve platinum status and spawned the popular songs "Way Cool Jr." and "I Want a Woman", the record's performance was not enough to keep the group on the road for longer than seven months. As a result, "What's It Gonna Be", a track not released as a single, was used as a B-side to "Lovin' You's a Dirty Job", the first single from the band's next release Detonator. In doing so, it was hoped that listeners would go back and give Reach for the Sky a second listen.

Reach for the Sky marked the last Ratt album to be produced by Beau Hill. The band originally intended for the record to be produced entirely by Mike Stone. However, substandard DAT tape recordings of Stone's production efforts prompted then-Atlantic Records president Doug Morris to bring in Hill to assist Stone and salvage the album.

== Release and promotion ==
The album was accompanied by the single "I Want a Woman". The song is also on their greatest hits album, Ratt & Roll 81-91. "I Want a Woman" was composed by Ratt members Robbin Crosby, Juan Croucier and Stephen Pearcy, as well as producer Beau Hill. The video for this song was partially shot at The Palace of Auburn Hills in Auburn Hills, Michigan on January 28, 1989.

Opening acts on the promotional record tour included Great White, Warrant, Britny Fox, and Kix.

Pro-wrestler Brian Pillman used "Don't Bite the Hand That Feeds" as his theme music, when WCW talent went on tour with New Japan Pro-Wrestling. Another pro wrestler, Larry Zbyszko, used "City To City" as his theme music in New Japan.

== Critical reception ==
Upon release Nick Robinson of British magazine Music Week reviewed the album more or less positively. He said the "production and sound is virtually faultless", but expressed a shame about a lack of originality in "good hard rock stuff."

== Track listing ==
Side one
No.	Title	Writer(s)	Length
1.	"City to City"	Robbin Crosby; Juan Croucier; Warren DeMartini; Stephen Pearcy; Beau Hill	3:31
2.	"I Want a Woman"	Crosby; Croucier; Pearcy; Hill	3:58
3.	"Way Cool Jr."	DeMartini; Pearcy; Hill	4:27
4.	"Don't Bite the Hand That Feeds"	Crosby; Croucier; Pearcy; Hill	3:08
5.	"I Want to Love You Tonight"	Crosby; DeMartini; Pearcy	4:27

Side two
No.	Title	Writer(s)	Length
6.	"Chain Reaction"	DeMartini; Croucier; Pearcy	3:42
7.	"No Surprise"	DeMartini; Pearcy	4:03
8.	"Bottom Line"	Crosby; Croucier; DeMartini; Pearcy; Hill	4:20
9.	"What's It Gonna Be"	Crosby; Croucier; DeMartini; Pearcy; Hill	4:07
10.	"What I'm After"	Croucier; Pearcy	3:35
Total length:			39:25

== Personnel ==
Ratt

- Stephen Pearcy – lead vocals
- Robbin Crosby – lead & rhythm guitar, backing vocals
- Warren DeMartini – lead & rhythm guitar, backing vocals
- Juan Croucier – bass guitar, backing vocals
- Bobby Blotzer – drums, percussion, harmonica, washboard

Additional musicians

- New West Horns arranged by Chris Botti and Kent Smith

Production

- Produced By Beau Hill and Mike Stone
- Recorded by Stephen Benben and Al Wright; assisted by Marty Hornburg, Tom Banghart and Jim Mitchell
- Mixed by Stephen Benben and Beau Hill

== Charts ==
Chart (1988)	Peak position
Japanese Albums (Oricon)	6
Swedish Albums (Sverigetopplistan)	28
UK Albums (Official Charts)	82
US Billboard 200	17

== Certifications ==
Region	Certification	Certified units/sales
Japan (RIAJ)	Gold	100,000^{^}
United States (RIAA)	Platinum	1,000,000^{^}
^{^} Shipments figures based on certification alone.
