= Detonator (album) =

Studio album by Ratt
- Released: August 21, 1990
- Studios: Music Grinder, Lion Share, and Microplant (Los Angeles)
- Genre: Glam metal
- Length: 42:12
- Label: Atlantic
- Producer: Desmond Child

Ratt chronology
Reach for the Sky (1988)	Detonator (1990)	Ratt & Roll 81–91 (1991)

Singles from Detonator
- 1. "Lovin' You's a Dirty Job" Released: October 1990 (UK); 2. "Shame Shame Shame" Released: 1990 (Japan)

Professional ratings
Review scores
Source	Rating
AllMusic	2.5/5 stars
Collector's Guide to Heavy Metal	7/10
Rolling Stone	(mixed)
Select	4/5 medals

Detonator is the fifth studio album by American glam metal band Ratt, released August 21, 1990, by Atlantic Records. This is the last album to feature bassist Juan Croucier and guitarist Robbin Crosby before the latter's death in 2002.

Though their previous album Reach for the Sky went platinum, it met with some criticism regarding the quality of their songs. In an attempt to regain the popularity that Ratt had in the mid-1980s, the band parted ways with long-time producer Beau Hill. Songwriter Desmond Child was hired as producer for the album. The album is notable for featuring Ratt's only power ballad, "Givin' Yourself Away". The band also gravitated towards a more glam metal/pop metal sound on Detonator.

== Release ==
The single "Shame Shame Shame" was released in 1990 in Japan. The song's lyrics focus mainly on cheating. The song was co-written by famed songwriter Desmond Child, Ratt guitarist Warren DeMartini and lead singer Stephen Pearcy. The song features a slow detuned opening guitar solo, titled "Intro To Shame", that suddenly speeds up at the 0:55 mark until the drums and the bass come in at 1:01 into the song. In the music video for the song, the band members are in an airship. The airship is apparently being attacked by another airship piloted and manned by a crew of strippers. The band retaliates and is successfully defeating the other airship until one of the women activates a switch called "Detonator" (also the title of the album). After doing so, the band's airship blows up and the bandmembers and strippers fall safely from the sky unharmed. The cliffhanger ending is not resolved until the video for their next single, "Lovin' You's a Dirty Job".

== Reception and legacy ==
Andy Hinds of AllMusic gave the album two and a half stars, referring to it as "clean and focused, but [lacking] some of the live-sounding energy of the band's earlier work".

In a June 2001 interview, guitarist Robbin Crosby said he disliked the pop-oriented direction Desmond Child took the band in on Detonator. Crosby additionally stated that he had wanted them to go into a much heavier direction on Detonator, believing this would have helped keep the band more relevant in the evolving music scene.

== Track listing ==
No.	Title	Writer(s)	Length
1.	"Intro to Shame"	Warren DeMartini	0:55
2.	"Shame Shame Shame"	DeMartini; Stephen Pearcy; Desmond Child	4:32
3.	"Lovin' You's a Dirty Job"	DeMartini; Juan Croucier; Pearcy; Child	3:14
4.	"Scratch That Itch"	Croucier; Pearcy; Child	3:16
5.	"One Step Away"	Croucier; DeMartini; Pearcy; Bobby Blotzer; Child	4:50
6.	"Hard Time"	DeMartini; Pearcy; Child	3:46
7.	"Heads I Win, Tails You Lose"	DeMartini; Pearcy; Child	3:59
8.	"All or Nothing"	Robbin Crosby; DeMartini; Pearcy; Child; Terry Kilgore	4:14
9.	"Can't Wait on Love"	Crosby; Croucier; DeMartini; Pearcy; Blotzer; Child	4:04
10.	"Givin' Yourself Away"	Pearcy; Child; Diane Warren	5:26
11.	"Top Secret"	DeMartini; Pearcy; Child	3:49
Total length:			42:12

== Personnel ==
Ratt

- Stephen Pearcy – lead and backing vocals
- Robbin Crosby – rhythm guitar, backing vocals
- Warren DeMartini – lead guitar, backing vocals
- Juan Croucier – bass guitar, backing vocals
- Bobby Blotzer – drums and percussion

Guest musicians

- Jon Bon Jovi – backing vocals on "Heads I Win, Tails You Lose"
- Myriam Valle – backing vocals on "All or Nothing"
- Myriam Valle, Desmond Child – additional backing vocals
- Michael Schenker – tag on "Shame Shame Shame"
- Steve Deutsch – sample and synth programming
- David Garfield – keyboards

Production

- Desmond Child – producer
- Steve Heinke, Lawrence Ethan, Jesse Kanner – assistant engineers
- Mike Shipley – mixing at The Enterprise in Burbank, California
- Bob Ludwig – mastering at Masterdisk in New York City

== Charts ==
Chart (1990)	Peak position
Finnish Albums (The Official Finnish Charts)	36
Japanese Albums (Oricon)	9
UK Albums (Official Charts)	55
US Billboard 200	23

== Certifications ==
Region	Certification	Certified units/sales
United States (RIAA)	Gold	500,000^{^}
^{^} Shipments figures based on certification alone.
