= Invasion of Your Privacy =

Studio album by Ratt
- Released: May 30, 1985
- Recorded: 1985
- Studios: Rumbo (Los Angeles); Atlantic (New York)
- Genres: Heavy metal; glam metal
- Length: 36:02
- Label: Atlantic
- Producer: Beau Hill

Ratt chronology
Out of the Cellar (1984)	Invasion of Your Privacy (1985)	Dancing Undercover (1986)

Singles from Invasion of Your Privacy
- 1. "Lay It Down" Released: June 1985 (US); 2. "You're in Love" Released: September 1985 (US); 3. "What You Give Is What You Get" Released: January 25, 1986 (Japan)

Professional ratings
Review scores
Source	Rating
AllMusic	4/5 stars
Collector's Guide to Heavy Metal	7/10
Metal Storm	8.9/10
Rolling Stone	(mixed)

Invasion of Your Privacy is the second studio album by American heavy metal band Ratt. It was released in 1985 and featured the singles "Lay It Down", "You're in Love" and "What You Give Is What You Get". Beau Hill produced the album, and the cover model is Playboy model Marianne Gravatte, who also made an appearance in the "Lay It Down" music video. In 2015, Loudwire ranked the album as the 8th best metal album of 1985.

== Track listing ==
Side one
No.	Title	Writer(s)	Length
1.	"You're in Love"	Juan Croucier; Stephen Pearcy	3:12
2.	"Never Use Love"	Pearcy	3:54
3.	"Lay It Down"	Warren DeMartini; Croucier; Robbin Crosby; Pearcy	3:23
4.	"Give It All"	Crosby; Pearcy	3:19
5.	"Closer to My Heart"	Crosby; Pearcy	4:30

Side two
No.	Title	Writer(s)	Length
6.	"Between the Eyes"	DeMartini; Pearcy	3:54
7.	"What You Give Is What You Get"	Croucier	3:47
8.	"Got Me on the Line"	Crosby; Pearcy	3:04
9.	"You Should Know by Now"	Crosby; Croucier; Pearcy	3:29
10.	"Dangerous but Worth the Risk"	DeMartini; Croucier; Pearcy	3:30
Total length:			36:02

== Personnel ==
=== Ratt ===
- Stephen Pearcy – lead vocals
- Robbin Crosby – lead guitar, backing vocals
- Warren DeMartini – lead guitar, backing vocals
- Juan Croucier – bass guitar, backing vocals
- Bobby Blotzer – drums, percussion

=== Production ===
- Beau Hill – producer, engineer
- Jim Faraci, Stephen Benben – engineers
- Ted Jensen – mastering at Sterling Sound, New York

== Charts ==
Chart (1985)	Peak position
Canada Top Albums/CDs (RPM)	36
Finnish Albums (The Official Finnish Charts)	32
UK Albums (Official Charts)	50
US Billboard 200	7

== Certifications ==
Region	Certification	Certified units/sales
Canada (Music Canada)	Platinum	100,000^{^}
Japan (RIAJ)	Gold	100,000^{^}
United States (RIAA)	2× Platinum	2,000,000^{^}
^{^} Shipments figures based on certification alone.
