= Warren DeMartini =

American musician (born 1963)

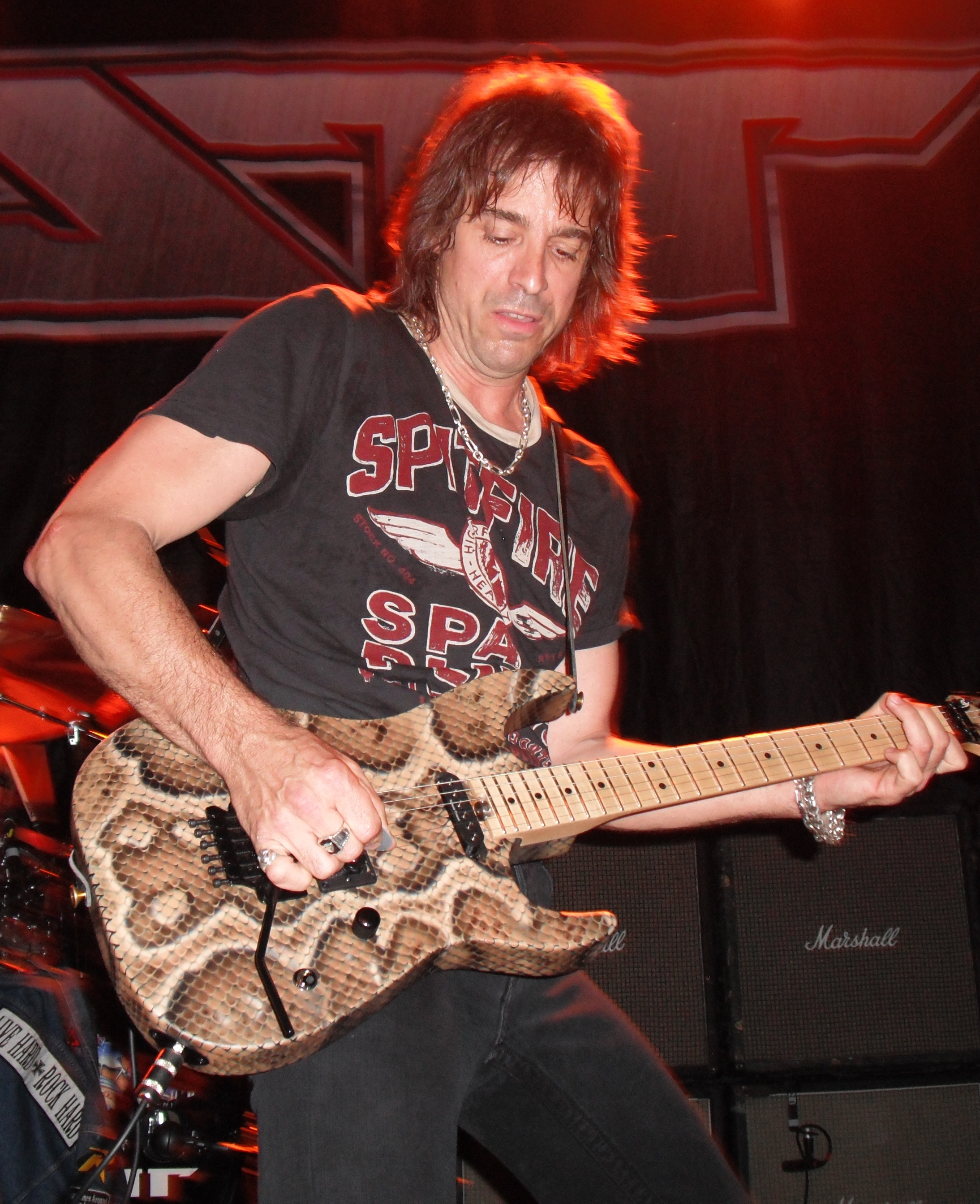
- DeMartini performing in 2010

Background information
- Born: April 10, 1963 (age 63); Chicago, Illinois, U.S.
- Genres: Glam metal, heavy metal, hard rock
- Occupation: Guitarist
- Years active: 1981–present
- Formerly of: Ratt
- Website: therattpack.com

Warren Justin DeMartini (born April 10, 1963) is an American musician best known as the lead guitarist for glam metal band Ratt, which achieved international stardom in the 1980s.

== Early life ==
DeMartini was born on April 10, 1963, in Chicago, Illinois, the youngest of five boys. He spent his early years in the suburb of River Forest, Illinois. The family later relocated to San Diego. DeMartini became interested in rock music due to the influence of his older brothers Bernard and James, whose band rehearsed in the family basement. His grandmother was also a musician, playing piano accompaniment to silent movies in Preston, Minnesota.

DeMartini's mother bought him a guitar at his request when he was "around seven or eight years old". According to Warren, he struggled early on learning to play it due to the tuning pegs being cheap, causing the instrument to constantly fall out of tune. As a result, he became frustrated and smashed the instrument as he had seen Pete Townshend of the Who do onstage. As a result, that was the last guitar he would receive as a gift. At age 14, he had to get himself a job in order to raise the money to purchase a new electric guitar, a Cimar Les Paul copy. The first song DeMartini learned was "Sunshine of Your Love" by Cream, which he learned by ear.

Warren played his first concert with his band the Plague in front of a small crowd at San Diego's La Jolla High School at the age of 15. By this time he was emerging as one of the San Diego area's most talented and sought-after young guitar players. The first year he signed up, he won "Best New Guitar Player in San Diego" at Guitar Trader on Clairemont Mesa Blvd. He graduated from high school in 1981. DeMartini began taking classes at a local college, but in the first semester was invited up to Los Angeles to join Mickey Ratt, the band that would eventually become the highly successful 1980s metal band Ratt.

== Ratt ==
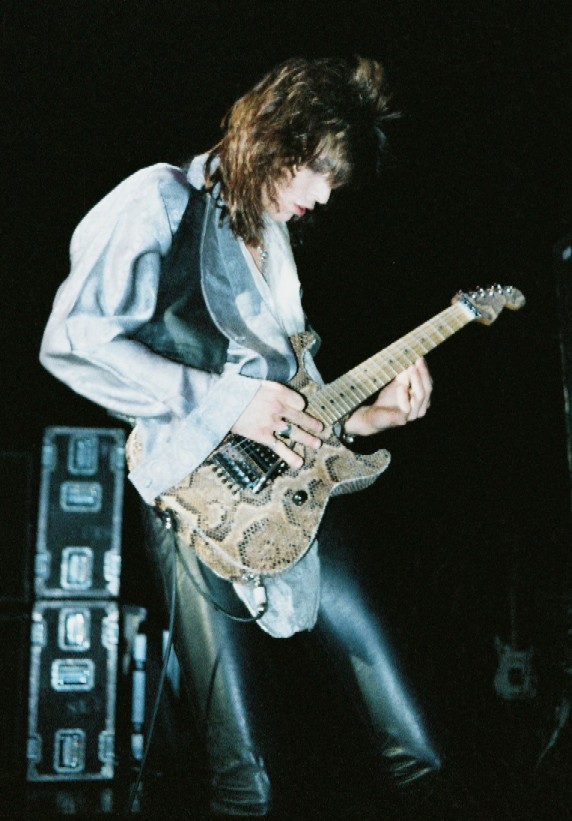
DeMartini in London, 1986

DeMartini replaced Jake E. Lee, who would be hired by Ozzy Osbourne in December 1982. When DeMartini was called up from San Diego to join RATT in Los Angeles, he lived with Lee to learn the songs on the band's first album, and each greatly influenced the other's styles.

DeMartini's lead guitar became one of Ratt's most recognizable aspects, and he would co-write several of the band's best known songs, including "Round and Round", "Lay It Down", "Dance", and "Way Cool Jr.". Ratt would ultimately become one of the top-selling and most popular metal acts of the decade, issuing four consecutive platinum albums and one EP in the 1980s before disbanding in February 1992.

== Post-Ratt and returns ==
After Ratt broke up, DeMartini had a short stint with the band Dokken before briefly becoming a touring guitarist for hard rock band Whitesnake in 1994. In 1995, he released his debut solo song "Surf's Up" as an EP featuring remixes of the title track, followed by his only full-length album to date, Crazy Enough to Sing to You, in 1996. Ratt reunited in 1996 and released two albums, Collage in July 1997, and a self-titled album in July 1999, which was a critical and commercial failure. In 2003, DeMartini was hired to replace guitarist Doug Aldrich in the band Dio but after several rehearsals he decided to leave the band due to musical differences with band leader Ronnie James Dio. Ratt reformed again in 2007 and began a tour in the summer of that year. In March 2018, it was widely rumored that DeMartini had lost interest with continuing forward with Ratt due to ongoing problems within the band. In July 2018, Ratt stated that DeMartini would no longer be involved with the current touring lineup as "he didn't want to go out there anymore."

== Technique ==
VH1 labeled him as one of the ten most underrated "hair metal" guitarists of the 80s.

Warren will sometimes use finger vibrato, similar in style to George Lynch. Allan Holdsworth often used the same technique, which achieves the periodic raising and lowering of the note by moving the fretting finger longitudinally, back and forth along the string, to alter the pitch, as opposed to bending the string across the frets. Moderate downward finger pressure and relatively light strings are necessary for friction of the fingertip against the string to facilitate such pushing and pulling, respectively lowering and raising the pitch, as well as frets to stop the strings, making such vibrato possible. (Violin-style vibrato requires moving the fingertip along the string's length somewhat, more of a rolling approach, since the violin and family lack frets altogether.)

== Discography ==
=== Ratt ===
- Ratt EP (1983)
- Out of the Cellar (1984)
- Invasion of Your Privacy (1985)
- Dancing Undercover (1986)
- Reach for the Sky (1988)
- Detonator (1990)
- Ratt & Roll 81-91 (1991)
- Collage (1997)
- Ratt (1999)
- Infestation (2010)

=== Solo ===
- Crazy Enough to Sing to You (1996)

=== Glenn Hughes ===
- L.A. Blues Authority Volume II: Glenn Hughes – Blues (1991)

=== Dweezil Zappa ===
- Confessions (1991)
