= Ratt (EP) =

EP by Ratt
- Released: May 1983
- Genre: Heavy metal
- Length: 22:03
- Label: Time Coast
- Producer: Liam Sternberg

Ratt chronology
Ratt (1983)	Out of the Cellar (1984)

Singles from Ratt
- 1. "You Think You're Tough" / "Walkin' the Dog" Released: 1983

Professional ratings
Review scores
Source	Rating
AllMusic	3/5 stars
Collector's Guide to Heavy Metal	7/10

Ratt is the debut EP by American glam metal band Ratt. It was released independently in 1983 on the band's Time Coast label.

== Background ==
The version of "Back for More" featured on this EP is an earlier recording than the one on the album Out of the Cellar. The European version also features an earlier recording of "You're in Trouble" as a bonus track, believed to feature Joey Cristofanilli on bass guitar. A cover of Rufus Thomas' "Walkin' the Dog" is also included, presumably as a nod to the 1973 Aerosmith version. It is also noted for the strong lead guitar presence of guitarist Robbin Crosby, whose trademark "blues with a twist" solos are prominent through the first four songs. An early version of "Tell the World" (which did not feature Bobby Blotzer or Juan Croucier) was also featured on the compilation Metal Massacre, but was removed from later pressings. "U Got It" often opened the show c. 1983–84, and Stephen Pearcy did the same during his Nitronic 'Pure Hell' Tour in 2000.

In 1984, Atlantic Records remixed and re-released this EP following the success of Out of the Cellar. This reissue featured a glossier production mix to match the band's recent mainstream success, as well as an updated back-cover photo of the group with a more pronounced Sunset Strip glam appearance.

The legs on the front cover belong to Tawny Kitaen, the then girlfriend of guitarist Crosby."Ratt 'Ratt' EP". Sleaze Roxx. She later also posed on the cover of the band's 1984 album Out of the Cellar.

== Track listing ==
All tracks written by Robbin Crosby and Stephen Pearcy, except where indicated. Arrangements by Ratt.

Side one
No.	Title	Writer(s)	Length
1.	"Sweet Cheater"		2:41
2.	"You Think You're Tough"		3:58
3.	"U Got It"		3:01
4.	"You're in Trouble" (European-only release)	Robbin Crosby, Stephen Pearcy, Warren DeMartini	3:15

Side two
No.	Title	Writer(s)	Length
5.	"Tell the World"		3:15
6.	"Back for More"		5:16
7.	"Walking the Dog"	Rufus Thomas	3:38

== Personnel ==
Ratt

- Stephen Pearcy – lead vocals
- Robbin Crosby – guitars, backing vocals
- Warren DeMartini – guitars, backing vocals
- Juan Croucier – bass, backing vocals
- Bobby Blotzer – drums

Production

- Liam Sternberg – producer
- Ed Stasium – engineer, mixing
- Mark Leonard – executive producer

== Charts ==
Chart (1984)	Peak position
US Billboard 200	133
