= Juan Croucier =

American bassist

- Born: August 22, 1959 (age 66); Santiago de las Vegas, Cuba
- Genres: Glam metal; hard rock; heavy metal
- Occupations: Musician; songwriter; record producer
- Instruments: Bass; vocals
- Years active: 1973–present
- Member of: Ratt
- Formerly of: Dokken; Quiet Riot
- Website: www.juancroucier.com; www.rattsjuancroucier.com

Juan Croucier (born August 22, 1959) is a Cuban-born American musician. He is best known as the bassist for the hard rock/glam metal band Ratt.

== Career ==
Croucier attended Torrance High School in Torrance, California, and played in various bands. He began playing original songs in his bands, and joined a band called Spike by age 16 that was strictly playing originals. In 1977 he started a new band called FireFoxx along with Ron Abrams on guitar and Bobby Blotzer on drums (who likewise attended Torrance High School and would later also become a key member of Ratt). Croucier played with Quiet Riot shortly before Randy Rhoads left to play with Ozzy Osbourne, and played with DuBrow in 1981, although he did not record with either. Before he left DuBrow, Croucier introduced band leader Kevin DuBrow to Frankie Banali. They went on to form a new version of Quiet Riot, resulting in the debut record Metal Health.

Croucier played with Dokken for about four years (ca. 1979-1983) and toured Germany with the band several times. He played and sang backup on Dokken's 1979 EP Back in the Streets and their 1981 LP, Breaking the Chains, for which he co-wrote two songs. His replacement, Jeff Pilson, appears in the title track video from the album.

For approximately 18 months, Croucier was a member of both Ratt and Dokken simultaneously, before leaving Dokken.

Croucier played in Ratt for the remainder of the decade, and the four LPs they released in the 1980s all went platinum. Croucier wrote many of Ratt's biggest hits such as "Lack of Communication" and "You're in Love," and his backing vocals became a trademark part of the band's sound.

Croucier formed a new band Liquid Sunday in 1997, a project based on his solo album of the same name. Croucier sings and plays bass and guitar on the album; his brother Rick plays drums on the album as well. Liquid Sunday played on the same bill for one show with Pearcy during the summer of 2006 and later formed a new band called Dirty Rats, consisting of Croucier on bass and lead vocals, Carlos Cavazo on guitar, and John Medina on drums.

== Discography ==
=== Dokken ===
- Back in the Streets (1979)
- Breaking the Chains (1981)
- The Lost Songs: 1978–1981 (2020)

=== Ratt ===
- Ratt (1983)
- Out of the Cellar (1984)
- Invasion of Your Privacy (1985)
- Dancing Undercover (1986)
- Reach for the Sky (1988)
- Detonator (1990)

=== Solo ===
- Liquid Sunday (2001)
