= Bobby Blotzer =

American drummer (born 1958)

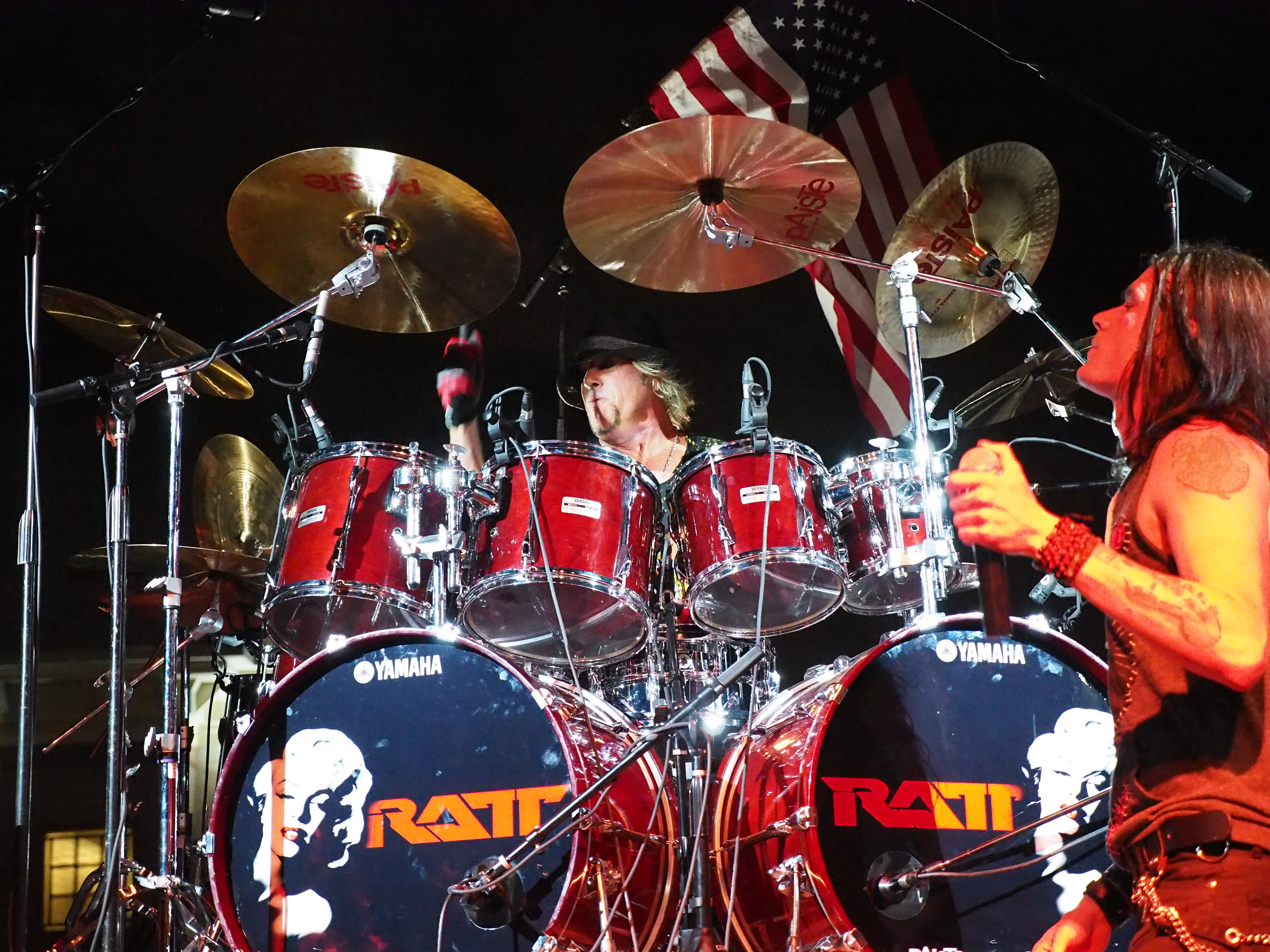
- Blotzer Performing in 2016

Background information
- Also known as: Bobby, Blotz, Blobsta
- Born: Robert John Blotzer; October 22, 1958 (age 67)
- Origin: Pittsburgh, Pennsylvania, US
- Genres: Glam metal, hard rock, blues rock, heavy metal
- Occupation: Musician
- Instrument: Drums

Robert John Blotzer (born October 22, 1958) is an American musician best known as the drummer for metal band Ratt. He attended Torrance High School in Torrance, California along with his future Ratt bandmate Juan Croucier.

== Ratt ==
Blotzer began his career playing with Don Dokken along with Juan Croucier. Blotzer and Croucier left Dokken in 1978 to form FireFoxx along with Ron Abrams on guitar. He became Ratt's drummer in 1982. Along with bassist Juan Croucier, he had previously played with noted Italian/Swiss guitarist Vic Vergeat, including a tour of the U.S. behind Vergeat's 1981 solo album Down to the Bone. Ratt had five consecutive platinum albums during the 1980s.

At the beginning of the 1990s Ratt's popularity waned, and the band called it quits in 1992. Blotzer started a more normal life outside the public eye. Five years later, Ratt reformed and toured once again. In 2000, Stephen Pearcy apparently quit the group, and shortly thereafter Bobby had exhibited an extreme dislike for Pearcy, who had sued the band for continuing under the "Ratt" name and had claimed the band had ruined their worldwide deal with Sony. Blotzer had heavily denied the claims and had said they were a bunch of "pathologic lies", adding that Pearcy was a "sick person". Blotzer and Ratt guitarist Warren DeMartini had subsequently won the court case to use the "Ratt" name.

In 2009, Metal Sludge reported that Blotzer was arrested and booked on charges of domestic violence.

In 2010, Blotzer released an autobiographical book, Tales of A Ratt – Things You Shouldn't Know. On September 2, 2012, it was announced Bobby would be joining Geoff Tate's touring lineup formed after the latter's dismissal from Queensrÿche, but he left on January 25, 2013, to return playing with Ratt. In March 2015, Blotzer guested with Las Vegas band Sin City Sinners. Blotzer asked Sinners' singer Joshua Alan, guitarist Michael "Doc" Ellis, and bassist Scott Griffin to join him in forming a new version of RATT. They toured under the name "Bobby Blotzer's Ratt Experience," performing Ratt songs. In September 2015, Blotzer announced that he had taken control of the Ratt brand and would take his band on tour in 2016 using the Ratt name. However, within days, Warren DeMartini spoke out against Blotzer using the name, as he owns half of the Ratt name as part of WBS, Inc., the company owned by him and Blotzer. Blotzer claimed he has the legal right to go on tour using the name, as DeMartini breached his fiduciary duty by refusing to tour under the Ratt name as a partner in the corporation. In October 2015, DeMartini sued Blotzer for falsely advertising his "tribute band" as the real thing. In November 2015, DeMartini's attempt to procure an injunction to prevent Blotzer from using and touring under the Ratt trademark was overturned, allowing Blotzer to tour using the name Ratt.

== Side projects ==
He has played with several side projects over the years, such as Contraband; he has also played as a touring drummer for Montrose.
