= Rocked, Wired & Bluesed: The Greatest Hits =

Greatest hits album by Cinderella
- Released: January 25, 2005
- Genre: Glam metal; blues rock; hard rock
- Length: 77:42
- Label: Mercury
- Producer: Mike Ragogna

Cinderella chronology
Once Upon A... (1997)	Rocked, Wired & Bluesed: The Greatest Hits (2005)	Extended Versions (2006)

Professional ratings
Review scores
Source	Rating
AllMusic	4/5 stars

Rocked, Wired & Bluesed: The Greatest Hits is a compilation album released by American rock band Cinderella in 2005, featuring tracks from their entire catalog.

== Track listing ==
All songs written and arranged by Tom Keifer except, "If You Don't Like It" and "Hot and Bothered", by Keifer and Eric Brittingham.

1. "Night Songs" – 4:12
2. "Shake Me" – 3:44
3. "Nobody's Fool" 4:47
4. "Somebody Save Me" – 3:16
5. "Bad Seamstress Blues / Fallin' Apart at the Seams" – 5:21
6. "Gypsy Road" – 4:01
7. "Don't Know What You Got (Till It's Gone)" – 5:54
8. "The Last Mile" – 3:51
9. "Long Cold Winter" – 5:21
10. "If You Don't Like It" – 4:14
11. "Coming Home" – 4:54
12. "The More Things Change" – 4:21
13. "Shelter Me" – 4:47
14. "Heartbreak Station" – 4:28
15. "Winds of Change" – 5:34
16. "Blood from a Stone" – 4:50
17. "Hot and Bothered" – 3:56

== Personnel ==
- Tom Keifer – lead vocals, electric guitar, 12 and 6-string acoustic guitars, steel guitar, dobro, piano, harmonica
- Jeff LaBar – guitar, slide guitar, background vocals
- Eric Brittingham – bass, 12-string bass, background vocals
- Fred Coury – drums, percussion, background vocals
