= Moscow Music Peace Festival =

1989 music festival

- Cover of the Moscow Music Peace Festival, Vol. 2 video release
- Genre: Glam metal; heavy metal
- Dates: 12 and 13 August 1989
- Locations: Moscow, Russian SFSR, USSR
- Years active: 1989
- Founders: Doc McGhee; Stas Namin

The Moscow Music Peace Festival was a rock concert that took place in the USSR on 12 and 13 August 1989 at Central Lenin Stadium (now called Luzhniki Stadium) in Moscow. Occurring during the glasnost era, it was one of first hard rock and heavy metal acts from abroad that were granted permission to perform in the capital city, (being the first the ten shows the British band Uriah Heep played from 7 to 16 December 1987 at the Olympic Stadium). Over 100,000 people attended and it was broadcast live to 59 nations including MTV in the United States. The event promoted understanding between the Western Bloc and the Eastern Bloc during the Cold War and also raised money to help those addicted to drugs and alcohol. The concert featured six bands from abroad and three Russian bands. The concert ended with the various band members participating in jam session. An album and documentary were released.

It inspired the 1990 song "Wind of Change" by Scorpions, one of the bands that performed at the concert. The song became one of the best selling singles of all time.

Modeled as a "Russian Woodstock" the concert was a joint production by Russian musician Stas Namin and American music manager Doc McGhee.

== Artists ==
- Cinderella: Tom Keifer, Fred Coury, Jeff LaBar, Eric Brittingham
- Gorky Park: Alexei Belov, Nikolai Noskov, Sasha Minkov, Jan Ianenkov, Sasha Lvov
- Nuance: Nikolai Gorenko, Serg Titovets, Pavel Titovets, Andrei Shmigov
- Brigada S: Garik Sukachov & the company
- Scorpions: Klaus Meine, Matthias Jabs, Francis Buchholz, Herman Rarebell, Rudolf Schenker
- Skid Row: Sebastian Bach, Dave Sabo, Rob Affuso, Rachel Bolan, Scotti Hill
- Mötley Crüe: Vince Neil, Nikki Sixx, Tommy Lee, Mick Mars
- Ozzy Osbourne: Ozzy Osbourne, Zakk Wylde, Randy Castillo, Geezer Butler, John Sinclair
- Bon Jovi: Jon Bon Jovi, Richie Sambora, Alec John Such, Tico Torres, David Bryan
- Special Guest (for finale): Jason Bonham

== Setlist ==
=== Skid Row ===
1. "Holidays in the Sun" (Sex Pistols cover)
2. "Makin' a Mess"
3. "Piece of Me"
4. "Big Guns"
5. "18 and Life"
6. "Youth Gone Wild"

=== Gorky Park ===
1. "Action"
2. "Hit Me with the News"
3. "Within Your Eyes"
4. "Danger"
5. "Try to Find Me"
6. "Bang"
7. "Child of the Wind"
8. "My Generation" (The Who cover)

=== Cinderella ===
1. "Bad Seamstress Blues"
2. "Somebody Save Me"
3. "If You Don't Like It"
4. "Push Push"
5. "The Last Mile"
6. "Coming Home"
7. "Gypsy Road"
8. "Nobody's Fool"
9. "Shake Me"

=== Mötley Crüe ===
1. "All in the Name of..."
2. "Live Wire"
3. "Shout at the Devil"
4. "Looks That Kill"
5. "Wild Side"
6. "Smokin' in the Boys Room" (Brownsville Station cover)
7. "Girls, Girls, Girls"
8. "Jailhouse Rock" (Elvis Presley cover)

=== Ozzy Osbourne ===
1. "I Don't Know"
2. "Flying High Again"
3. "Shot in the Dark"
4. "Miracle Man"
5. "Sweet Leaf" *
6. "War Pigs" *
7. "Tattooed Dancer"
8. "Suicide Solution"
9. "Crazy Train"
10. "Paranoid" *

* = Black Sabbath songs

=== Scorpions ===
1. "Blackout"
2. "Big City Nights"
3. "Bad Boys Running Wild"
4. "Rhythm of Love"
5. "The Zoo"
6. "No One Like You"
7. "The Song of the Volga Boatmen" (Russian folk song)
8. "Holiday"
9. "Still Loving You"
10. "Dynamite"
11. "Rock You Like a Hurricane"

=== Bon Jovi ===
1. "Lay Your Hands on Me"
2. "I'd Die for You"
3. "Wild in the Streets"
4. "You Give Love a Bad Name"
5. "Let It Rock"
6. "Living in Sin"
7. "Blood on Blood"
8. "Runaway"
9. "Wanted Dead or Alive"
10. "Livin’ on a Prayer"
11. "Bad Medicine"

=== Jam session ===
1. "Hound Dog" (Big Mama Thornton cover) - Bon Jovi, Cinderella, Scorpions
2. "Long Tall Sally"/"Blue Suede Shoes" - Scorpions, Gorky Park, David Bryan
3. "Rock and Roll" (Led Zeppelin cover) - Skid Row, Mötley Crüe, Zakk Wylde, Jason Bonham
4. "Give Peace a Chance" (Plastic Ono Band cover)

== Album ==
Stairway to Heaven/Highway to Hell was a 1989 compilation album featuring bands that performed at the Moscow Music Peace Festival. It was released by the Make a Difference Foundation. Each song is a cover of a famous solo artist or rock band who had suffered a drug- or alcohol-related death.

== Controversies ==
The concert was put together by the Make a Difference Foundation, its founder, rock producer and manager Doc McGhee, Stas Namin and other major players in the Soviet Union and the United States. It is often stated that McGhee agreed to bring his artists to Moscow after becoming involved in a drug scandal himself and wishing to avoid a jail sentence, but he explicitly denied that in 2011. "We always wanted to go over to Moscow and do the first rock show in the Soviet Union. I wanted to do their Woodstock." Since it had also been part of that plan that the proceeds would go to Make a Difference and doctors would be brought to the USSR to teach methods of treating addiction (Soviet doctors at the time primarily used electroshock therapy for that purpose), he did not expect the sentencing judge would have denied him the opportunity.

Mötley Crüe have been on record stating they were upset with McGhee at this point in time. They felt McGhee was favoring Bon Jovi, whom he also managed, and whom Crüe disdained. When Bon Jovi closed the show, they used pyrotechnics, which Mötley Crüe had been told they could not do (McGhee claims it was a malfunction on one side of the stadium that he did not hear because he was backstage). Sebastian Bach of Skid Row, whom McGhee also managed, says Tommy Lee went over to him and said "Your manager's a fucking asshole" and chugged most of a bottle of vodka Bach had been drinking (up to this point, Lee has said, it was the first time the band had done a show sober). Then he ran up to McGhee, punched him in the face and told him he could go manage The Chipmunks because he was no longer Mötley Crüe's manager. Bon Jovi fired him as well shortly afterwards. Lee and his bandmates were still so angry they refused to fly home on the same plane as McGhee. The concert was also often chided by the bands themselves as being hypocritical, as many of the musicians were drinking or using drugs at the time despite the ties with the Make a Difference Foundation.

The event was held over two days in Moscow's largest stadium, Central Lenin Stadium (now called Luzhniki Stadium), which has a seating capacity of about 100,000. However, as the concert used a proscenium stage rather than an arena stage, about a thousand seats behind the stage were not occupied. About 120,000 tickets were sold in total. The event was the first rock concert to be held at the stadium, which had previously been used primarily for sporting events.

Noted in books such as Bang Your Head: The Rise and Fall of Heavy Metal, the concert also showcased the ego clashes which eventually helped lead to the collapse of glam metal shortly thereafter. Many of the bands argued over who went on before whom, and many were envious of Bon Jovi, who not only headlined the event but also had a much more theatrical stage spectacle and longer set times; each band was supposed to do a stripped-down show with just music and no spectacular theatrics. Jon Bon Jovi supposedly offered his headlining spot to Ozzy Osbourne after Ozzy threatened to not go through with his set. Ozzy's set was initially scheduled before Mötley Crüe's set. Apparently, Ozzy felt his band was bigger and he should go on after Mötley Crüe. To solve the problem, Mötley Crüe went on before Ozzy but the tape was edited so it appeared Ozzy went on before Mötley Crüe to the viewers back in the U.S. Those involved in the show's production felt this was an egotistical bush move on Ozzy's behalf since this was supposed to be for charity, and left many in the rock 'n roll community confused since Ozzy and Mötley Crüe toured together for Ozzy's Bark at the Moon and Mötley Crüe's Shout at the Devil albums, respectively, and became fast friends during the tour.

The event became known for inspiring the song "Wind of Change" by the Scorpions, a ballad which became a soundtrack to the collapse of the Berlin Wall and the end of Soviet Union. The Crooked Media podcast "Winds of Change" provides some evidence to suggest that Doc McGhee was covertly leveraged by the US Government to produce this concert as a vehicle to create an origin story for the Scorpions song as part of a secret culture operation to influence the Soviet government.

== See also ==
- List of historic rock festivals
- List of heavy metal festivals
