= Cinderella discography =

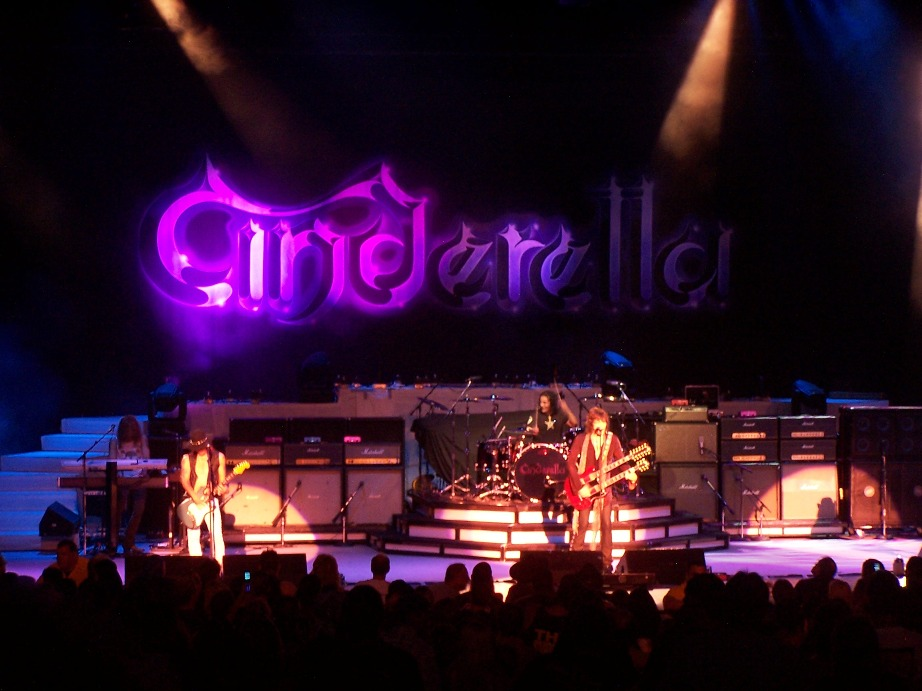
- Cinderella in 2006
- Studio albums: 4
- Live albums: 10
- Singles: 14
- Video albums: 10
- Compilations: 6

The following is a comprehensive discography of Cinderella, an American hard rock/glam metal band.

== Albums ==
=== Studio albums ===
Title	Album details	Peak chart positions									Certifications
Title	Album details	US	AUS	CAN	FIN	GER	NOR	SWE	SWI	UK	Certifications
Night Songs	Released: June 9, 1986; Label: Mercury	3	—	15	27	—	—	—	—	—	US: 3× Platinum; CAN: Platinum
Long Cold Winter	Released: July 5, 1988; Label: Mercury	10	32	24	15	24	13	38	7	30	US: 3× Platinum; CAN: 2× Platinum; SWI: Gold
Heartbreak Station	Released: November 20, 1990; Label: Mercury	19	72	28	39	34	16	42	8	36	US: Platinum; CAN: Platinum; SWI: Gold
Still Climbing	Released: November 8, 1994; Label: Mercury	178	187	—	—	—	—	—	29	88	
"—" denotes items that did not chart or were not released in that territory.

=== Live albums ===
Year	Title
1991	Live Train to Heartbreak Station Registered live on 21 May 1991, at the Barton Coliseum, Little Rock (Arkansas)
1999	Live (self-released, sold at concerts and through fan club)
1999	Live at the Key Club
2006	Extended Versions

=== Compilation albums ===
Year	Title
1997	Once Upon A...
2000	20th Century Masters - The Millennium Collection: The Best of Cinderella
2001	The Collection
2005	Rocked, Wired & Bluesed: The Greatest Hits
2006	Gold

== Singles ==
Year	Title	Peak chart positions						Album
Year	Title	US	US Rock	AUS	CAN	FIN	UK	Album
1984	"Shake Me": b/w "Nobody's Fool" (1984 versions)	—	—	—	—	—	—	Non-album single
1986	"Shake Me"	—	41	—	—	—	98	Night Songs
1986	"Nobody's Fool"	13	25	—	35	—	—	Night Songs
1987	"Somebody Save Me"	66	37	—	—	—	—	Night Songs
1987	"Night Songs" (EP)	—	—	—	—	—	—	Night Songs
1988	"Gypsy Road"	51	20	—	89	19	54	Long Cold Winter
1988	"Don't Know What You Got (Till It's Gone)"	12	10	145	60	—	54	Long Cold Winter
1989	"The Last Mile"	36	18	155	—	—	—	Long Cold Winter
1989	"Coming Home"	20	13	—	—	—	—	Long Cold Winter
1990	"Shelter Me"	36	5	48	27	—	55	Heartbreak Station
1991	"Heartbreak Station"	44	10	185	51	—	63	Heartbreak Station
1991	"The More Things Change" [promo]	—	41	—	—	—	—	Heartbreak Station
1992	"Hot and Bothered"	—	45	—	—	—	—	Still Climbing
1994	"Bad Attitude Shuffle" [promo]	—	37	—	—	—	—	Still Climbing
"—" denotes items that did not chart or were not released in that territory.

== Videos ==
- Night Songs: The Videos (1987) - VHS Gold (RIAA)
- Tales from the Gypsy Road (1990) - VHS (Later reissued as 2009 DVD) Gold (RIAA)
- Heartbreak Station Video Collection (1991) - VHS
- Looking Back Video Collection (1997) - VHS
- Cinderella Millennium DVD Video Collection (2003) - DVD
- Rocked, Wired & Bluesed – The Greatest Video Hits (2005) - DVD
- Cinderella: In Concert - The Heartbreak Station Tour (2005) - DVD
- Cinderella: In Concert (2008) - DVD (Same content as Cinderella: In Concert - The Heartbreak Station Tour 2005 DVD)
- Tales from the Gypsy Road 2008 (2009) - DVD (2009 DVD reissue of 1990 VHS)
- In Concert: Remastered Edition (2009) - DVD (includes Bonus CD)
- In Concert: Live 1991 (2010) - DVD
