= The Way Life Goes (album) =

Studio album by Tom Keifer
- Released: 30 April 2013
- Recorded: 2003–2013
- Genre: Hard rock, blues rock
- Length: 51:36
- Label: Merovee Records
- Producer: Chuck Turner, Tom Keifer, Savannah Keifer

Tom Keifer chronology
The Way Life Goes (2013)	Rise (2019)

The Way Life Goes is the debut solo album by Cinderella frontman Tom Keifer. It was released on 30 April 2013. The Japanese edition features an additional track titled "Getting Even".

== Background ==
Tom Keifer had been working on The Way Life Goes since 2003. It was released on 30 April 2013 through Merovee Records, part of Warner Music Group's Independent Label Group. This is the first new studio material from Keifer or Cinderella since Still Climbing in 1994.

"The Flower Song" was the album's lead single, released for radio airplay on 4 February 2013. "Solid Ground" followed on 11 March.

== Reception ==
Professional ratings
Review scores
Source	Rating
AllMusic	4/5 stars
Hard Rock Hideout	9/10 stars
Metal Forces	8/10 stars

The Way Life Goes has received mostly positive critical reviews since its release.

AllMusic gave the album four of a possible five stars, with reviewer Stephen Erlewine saying, "This is who he is: a man slightly out of time and a musician who's gotten better at his craft over the years, winding up with the best record he's ever made." Writer William Clark of Music Enthusiast Magazine wrote, "Although us fans have had to wait nearly twenty years to hear some new material from the renowned musician, when those first few racing guitar licks to "Welcome to My Mind" come cranking out of your speakers, you instantly know this album was more than worth the wait."

Metal Forces calls the album "an impressive piece of work that is multi-layered and jam-packed full of emotion with not a duff tune to be found," while Hard Rock Hideout described the album in saying "fantastic songwriting and outstanding playing fill The Way Life Goes, and Tom Keifer's voice has never sounded better!"

The Way Life Goes sold 5,400 copies in the United States in its first week of release to debut at No.78 on the Billboard 200 chart.

== Track listing ==
All songs written by Tom Keifer; co-writers are noted.

No.	Title	Co-writer(s)	Length
1.	"Solid Ground"	Savannah Keifer
2.	"A Different Light"	S.Keifer
3.	"It's Not Enough"	S.Keifer, Kent Agee
4.	"Cold Day in Hell"	Jim Peterik
5.	"Thick And Thin"
6.	"Ask Me Yesterday"	S.Keifer, J.Peterik
7.	"Fools Paradise"
8.	"The Flower Song"	J.Peterik
9.	"Mood Elevator"	S.Keifer
10.	"Welcome to my Mind"	S.Keifer, Blair Daly
11.	"You Showed Me"
12.	"Ain't That A Bitch"	S.Keifer, Conley White
13.	"The Way Life Goes"
14.	"Babylon"	S.Keifer, Doug Gordon

== Deluxe edition ==
Released 20 October 2017, the deluxe edition follows the 14-song track listing of the original 2013 album release, with the addition of these 3 bonus track songs:

No.	Title	Length
15.	"Nobody's Fool (duet version) – with Lzzy Hale"
16.	"With a Little Help from My Friends"
17.	"Nobody's Fool" (piano version) – with Lzzy Hale"

The deluxe edition is a special 2-disc CD/DVD set packaged in a 6-panel digipak, featuring all-new album artwork and a 20-page book with custom original illustrations for each track. Featured on the CD are 3 new bonus tracks studio-recorded by multi-time Grammy Award winning record producer, audio engineer, and mixer Vance Powell, including a cover version of the Beatles' "With A Little Help From My Friends" and 2 different recordings of Cinderella's "Nobody’s Fool" in duet with Lzzy Hale of Halestorm. The bonus DVD contains The Way Life's Goin', a 30-minute documentary on the making of the 3 bonus tracks, as well as music videos, live footage, and more.

== Personnel ==
- Tom Keifer – vocals, acoustic guitar, electric guitar, slide guitar, keyboard
- Greg Morrow – drums, percussion
- Michael Rhodes – bass guitar
- Tony Harrell – piano, B3 organ, Wurlitzer, Clavinet

=== Additional personnel ===
- Jeff LaBar – guitar (9)
- Pat Buchanan – guitar and harmonica (4,6,8,11,13)
- Gary Burnette – guitar (11)
- Ron Wallace – acoustic guitar (6)
- Etta Britt – background vocals (1,4,6,8,13)
- Crystal Taliaferro – background vocals (1,4)
- Savannah Keifer – background vocals (2,3,6,9,10)
- Vicky Carraco – background vocals (4,6,8,13)
- Chuck Turner – background vocals (9)
- Jim Horne – saxophone (4)
- Tom Keifer, Savannah Keifer, Chuck Turner – producing, recording, engineering, and mixing
- Lzzy Hale – vocals (15,17: deluxe edition)
- Vance Powell – producing, recording, engineering, and mixing (15,16,17: deluxe edition)
