= Jim Drnec =

American musician

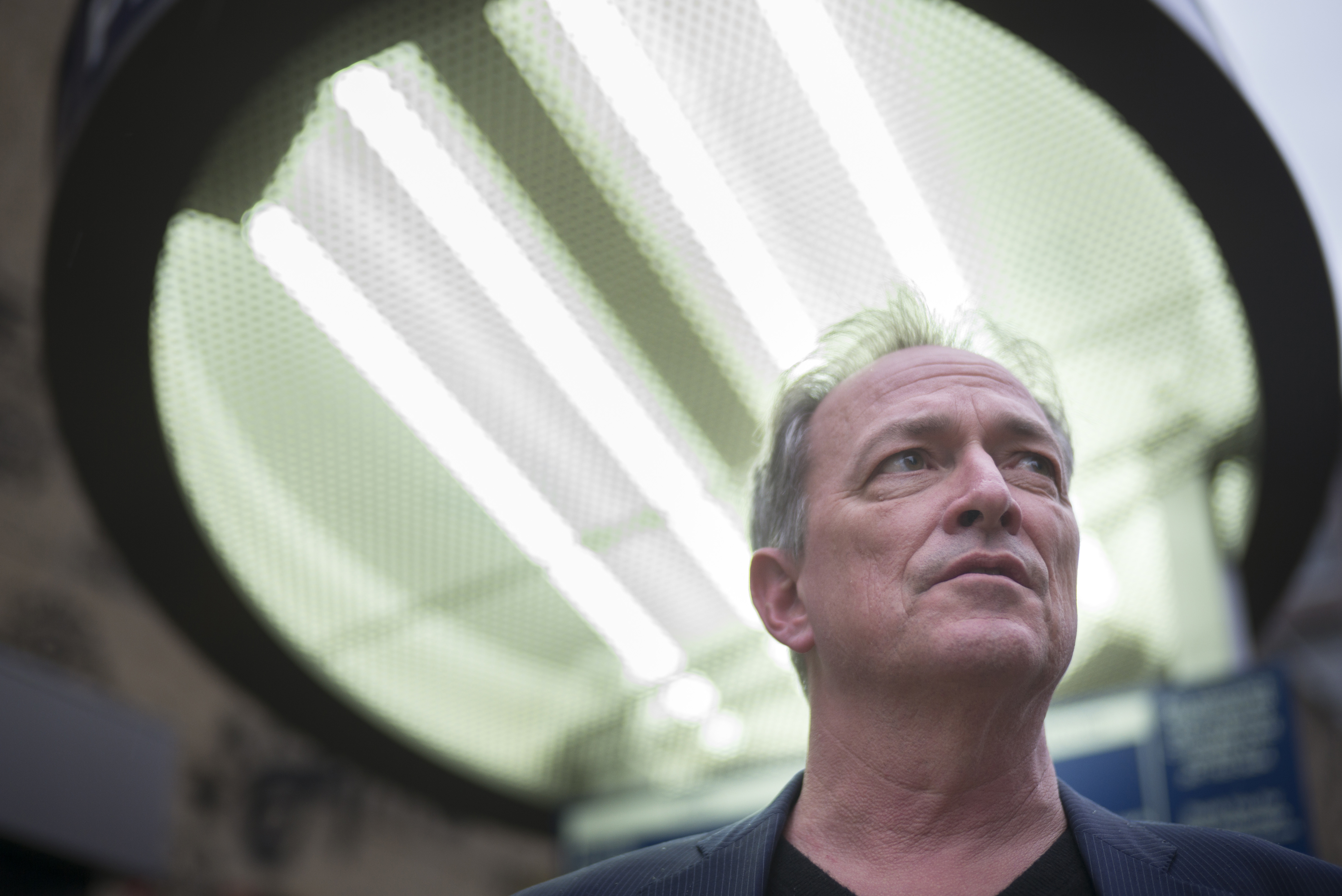
- Drnec in 2018

Background information
- Genres: Glam metal, hard rock
- Occupations: Musician; Lawyer
- Instrument: Drums

Jim Drnec is a drummer who played for the glam metal band Cinderella. He replaced original Cinderella drummer Tony Destra, who went on to the band Britny Fox. Drnec was himself replaced by drummer Fred Coury, although session player Jody Cortez played on Cinderella's first official album, Night Songs. Drnec is now a retired trial attorney in Delaware. In addition to Cinderella, from 1977 through 1989 Drnec played drums for Philly-area bands Big Eyes, Psychopath, V, Horsepower, The Dead End Kids, Hide Your Daughters, Network, and Tangier. In 1989, Network released their CD of original material, Crashin’ Hollywood. From 1990 through 1995, Drnec played drums for Southern California artists such as Raven Slaughter, A Pack of Gurus, The Blues Bastards, The Alexander Band, and The James Leigh Bishop Band. Most recently, Drnec played in the tri-state area locally with his blues band, The DelCats, from 2003 to 2009. Since 2006, Drnec has been playing in Philadelphia with local artist Tony Mecca in Mecca's band the Heavy MeNtal Gypsies. In 2020, Mecca released his seventh CD, Fractured Poetry. From 2011 to 2015, Drnec played drums for Ever/After, an all original hard rock band featuring Reggie Wu of Heaven's Edge, bassist Buddy Cash, guitarist Mike Sheahan, and vocalist Christopher Thomas of the Denver, Colorado band Omniism. Ever/After released its debut CD, A Beautiful Lie in August, 2013. The album contained all original material written by Wu and Drnec. Drnec was also the drummer for original Philadelphia rock band The Electric Boa in 2015–2016.

In 2011 Drnec began a new project, 33 1/3 LIVE, which performs classic albums in their entirety using a rotating cast of the Delaware Valley's best musicians. The musical collective has performed the first Montrose album, the first Cars album, The Who's Who's Next, Aerosmith's Rocks album, Robin Trower's Bridge of Sighs, and ZZ Top's Tres Hombres. 33 1/3 LIVE's Killer Queen Experience performs the music of Queen, featuring that band's classic LP A Night At The Opera. More such projects are planned.
