= Broken Promises (EP) =

Broken Promises EP

EP by Allen Crane
- Released: 2000
- Recorded: Atlantis Studio Nashville
- Genre: Hard rock
- Length: 21:01
- Label: The Orchard Records
- Producer: Voytek Kochanek

Broken Promises is the Allen Crane debut CD which features guitarist Mark Warner and veteran Cinderella drummer Fred Coury.

== Track listing ==
All tracks by Mark Warner

1. "Broken Promises" – 4:35
2. "She Came To Me" – 3:10
3. "Hootie Hoo Hoo" – 4:10
4. "Open Up Your Eyes" – 6:23
5. "Feelin' Better" – 3:32

== Personnel ==
- Mark Warner - acoustic guitars, electric guitars
- Glenn Ralph - vocals
- Steve Rossi - keyboards
- John Billings - bass
- Fred Coury - drums, percussion

== Reviews ==
- Splendid Ezine, March 2001 review
- Strutter Magazine, April 2001 review
