= Jody Cortez =

American drummer

- Born: 1960 (age 64–65)
- Instruments: Drums

Jody Cortez (born 1960) is an American studio musician. A drummer, Cortez began his professional career at the age of 21 as a member of Boz Scaggs' live band in 1981.

Cortez played drums on glam metal band Cinderella's 1986 debut album Night Songs after band drummer Jim Drnec was unable to complete the drum parts in studio and was fired. Fred Coury would later be hired as the band's permanent drummer. Though never an official member of Cinderella, the earliest pressing of Night Songs features a photo of Cortez on the back cover, though Coury was pictured on the album's front cover photo and listed as a band member in the liner notes.

Cortez has worked with David Crosby and played on the live version of the hit single "Hero" by Crosby and Phil Collins. In 1994, Cortez toured with CSN for the 25th Anniversary Tour, including Woodstock 2. In December 2009, he was announced as the new drummer for Yoso, although he left the band early in 2010.

== Touring history ==
World Tours:
1981-1983 Boz Scaggs
1984- Brenda Russell, T.J. Parker
1989-1995 David Crosby
1990-2001 Christopher Cross

== Discography ==
William MacGregor, Welcome to the Carnival 2007
Cinderella - Gold 2006
Judy Henske - She Sang California 2005
Cinderella - Rocked, Wired & Bluesed: The Greatest Hits 2005
David Crosby - Greatest Hits Live 2003
David Crosby - From the Front Row Live 2003
Chicago - The Box (Bonus DVD) 2003
Lisa Ono - Serenata Carioca 2000
Tony Gilkyson - Sparko 2000
Christopher Cross - Greatest Hits Live 1999
Paul Williams - Back to Love Again 1999
Mark Hayes - Transmitter 1999
Marcos Valle - Marcos Valle Songbook, Vol. 2 1998
Patricia Kaas - Dans ma chair 1997
Tania Alves - Amores E Boleros, Vol. 2 1996
Tamara Champlin - You Won't Get to Heaven Alive 1996
Michael Blake - End of the Century 1996
Christopher Cross - Window 1995
Oriental Spas - Pain 1995
David Crosby - It's All Coming Back to Me Now... 1995
Crosby, Stills & Nash - After the Storm 1994
Keith Chagall - Angels on the Faultline 1994
Christopher Cross - Rendezvous 1993
Louie Louie - Let's Get Started 1993
Various Artists - A Very Special Christmas, Vol. 2 1992
Sam Kinison - Leader of the Banned 1990
Christopher Williams - Adventures in Paradise 1989
Various Artists - Rock, Rhythm & Blues 1989
Various Artists - Playlist Plus: Very Special Christmas 1989
Peter Cetera - One More Story 1988
Nick Kamen w/Madonna - Us 1988
Phil Christian - No Prisoner 1988
Julie Brown - Trapped in the Body of a White Girl 1987
Cinderella - Night Songs 1986
Stephan Crane - Kicks 1984
Stone Fury - Burns Like a Star 1984
Louise Goffin - Fast Times at Ridgemont High 1982
