= Tangier (band) =

American hard rock band (1984–1992)

- Origin: Philadelphia, Pennsylvania, United States
- Genres: Hard rock, glam metal
- Years active: 1984–1992
- Labels: Atco; Wolfe Records
- Past members: Bill Matson; Mike LeCompt; Doug Gordon; Gari Saint; Rocco Mazzella; Adam F Ferraioli; Garry Nutt; Mike Kost; Bobby Bender; Marc Porco; Jim Drnec; Jeff McPhee; Mark Hopkins

Tangier was an American, Philadelphia-based hard rock band, which was active between 1984 and 1992.

== Biography ==
Tangier formed in Philadelphia, Pennsylvania, United States, by the songwriter and guitarist Doug Gordon, and grew up in the clubs with bands such as Cinderella, who helped the group by having Tangier open for them on their second major tour.

Tangier's first, independent self-titled debut album, comprised Bill Mattson (vocals), Doug Gordon (guitar, songwriter), Rocco Mazzella (guitar, songwriter), Mike Kost (bass) and Mark Hopkins (drums). After minor local success, Gordon decided to disband Tangier, and start fresh. He wrote new material and put together a new version of Tangier, utilizing only Mattson and Adam F Ferraioli from the previous lineup. Doug and Adam initially did the demo themselves later adding Bill and Tony R.on bass. Adam left to join Britny Fox whose drummer had died in a car crash, leaving Doug to then bring in Jimmy Drnec on drums. Gordon's competence as a rock lead guitarist was 'pro-filed' by Guitar World in its October 1989 issue, p. 118: "..... And on "Sweet Surrender," the album's tour de force. Gordon, after a growling 1-3-5 bass-note riff, launches into a dizzying, double tracked barn burner that suggests a summit meeting between Winter and Danny Gatton. This man can blaze." Garry Nutt was brought on board, as well as Gari Saint on guitar and Jimmy Drnec on drums. The band recorded demos and sought management and hooked up with Larry Mazer. The band showcased for many labels and was finally signed by Derek Shulman, who was to head up the reborn and revamped Atco Records label. Veteran producer Andy Johns was selected for to produce Four Winds. Bobby Bender was secured for the drums prior to recording Four Winds. It produced the hit singles "On The Line" and "Southbound Train".

For their second major label album, Stranded, there were some line-up changes again. Separating with both Mattson and Saint, the band brought in vocalist–guitarist Mike LeCompt. This album produced the hit single "Stranded", featuring Pamela Anderson in its music video. The band fell apart in 1992.

Gordon, Lecompt and Nutt are the only former members still active in the music business. LeCompt has his own band that performs regularly in the greater Philadelphia area. Bassist Nutt has been involved with Arcade, Laidlaw, Davy Jones, Mike Tramp, Cinderella, Jean Beauvoir, Skinny Molly, Dave Hlubek, and Mike Estes, and more recently toured with Chubby Checker. Gordon went on to co-produce, play sessions and write with other artists. He played guitar on Myles Goodwin's solo album, co-produced "I Just Can't Stop Lovin You" on Linear's 1992 album Caught in the Middle, and produced the Mojo's album Not for Nothin' ; plus he co-produced the Bakers Pink album (1993), and co-wrote "Babylon" on Tom Keifer's solo album That The Way Life Goes (2013).

== Former members ==
- Doug Gordon - guitar, backing vocals (1985-1992)
- Bill Mattson - lead vocals (1985-1990)
- Adam F Ferraioli - drums (1985-1987)
- Rocco Mazzella - guitar, backing vocals (1985-1986)
- Mike Kost - bass guitar, backing vocals (1985-1986)
- Mark Hopkins - drums (1985)
- Garry Nutt - bass guitar, backing vocals (1986-1992)
- Gari Saint - guitar, backing vocals (1986-1990) (died 2021)
- Jim Drnec - drums (1987-1988)
- Bobby Bender - drums (1989-1992)
- Michael "Mike" LeCompt - lead vocals, guitar, keyboards (1991-1992)

== Discography ==
=== Studio albums ===
Title	Release date	Label	Chart position
Tangier	1985	Wolfe Records	
Four Winds	1989	Atco	91 U.S.
Stranded	1991	Atco	187 U.S.

=== Singles ===
- "On The Line" - 1989 No. 67 US Hot 100
- "Southbound Train" - 1989
- "Stranded" - 1991
