= Long Cold Winter =

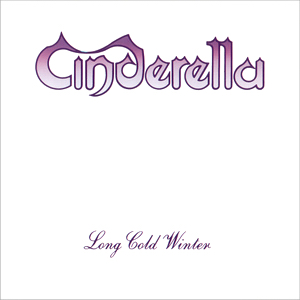

Studio album by Cinderella
- Released: July 5, 1988
- Recorded: 1987–1988
- Studios: Bearsville Studios (Woodstock, New York); Kajem Studios (Gladwyne, Pennsylvania) (overdubs)
- Genres: Glam metal; hard rock; blues rock
- Length: 43:51
- Labels: Mercury (US); Vertigo (UK)
- Producers: Andy Johns, Tom Keifer, Eric Brittingham

Cinderella chronology
Night Songs (1986)	Long Cold Winter (1988)	Heartbreak Station (1990)

Singles from Long Cold Winter
- 1. "Gypsy Road" Released: July 1988; 2. "Don't Know What You Got (Till It's Gone)" Released: August 1988; 3. "The Last Mile" Released: January 1989; 4. "Coming Home" Released: March 1989

Long Cold Winter is the second studio album by American glam metal band Cinderella. It was released in July 1988 on Mercury Records.

The record reached No. 10 in the US and became double-platinum for shipping two million copies in the US by the end of the year, just as their debut album Night Songs had done earlier. It was later certified triple platinum. The album features four singles, which all charted on the Billboard Hot 100. "Don't Know What You Got (Till It's Gone)", the band's highest-charting single, reached No. 12, "The Last Mile" reached No. 36, "Coming Home" reached No. 20, and "Gypsy Road" hit No. 51, more than a year after the release of the album.

In 2017, Metal Hammer included the album in their list of "the 10 hair metal albums you need in your record collection".

== Reception ==
Professional ratings
Review scores
Source	Rating
AllMusic	4/5 stars
Classic Rock	8/10 stars
Collector's Guide to Heavy Metal	5/10
Kerrang!	2.5/5 stars
Rock Hard	8.5/10
Rolling Stone	2/5 stars

The album received mixed-to-positive reviews. Music critics remarked the shift of the band's musical style from the clichéd glam metal of their debut to more blues-oriented compositions, but they did not agree in the evaluation of the songs' quality. Contemporary reviewers criticized the album for being "too bluesy" and too derivative of other more famous bands' influences. Only Rock Hard reviewer considered Long Cold Winter "a surprisingly strong rock'n'roll album, rough, unpolished, powerful, but still melodious", and praised Keifer's vocals and the level of songwriting.

Modern reviews are similarly polarized. Steve Huey of AllMusic reviewed Long Cold Winter as "a transition album for Cinderella, mixing pop-metal tunes with better hooks than those on Night Songs with a newfound penchant for gritty blues-rock à la the Stones or Aerosmith", and further explained his rating by saying "[not] all of the songs are memorable, but most of them are". Canadian journalist Martin Popoff was harsher in his judgement and wrote that Cinderella strived to be "a next Stones or Aerosmith, not realizing that such talents are both rare and natural, and that without the gift and conviction, [their] attempt reeks of imitation and crass commercialism." Twenty-two years after its release, Geoff Barton re-evaluated the album for the British magazine Classic Rock, praised the band for their change of musical style and called Long Cold Winter "a minor classic." In 2019, Chuck Eddy of Rolling Stone also praised the album and wrote that "in retrospect Long Cold Winter ranks with any blues-rock of the Eighties".

== Track listing ==
All music is composed by Tom Keifer except "If You Don't Like It" by Keifer and Eric Brittingham.

Side one
No.	Title	Length
1.	"Bad Seamstress Blues/Fallin' Apart at the Seams"	5:19
2.	"Gypsy Road"	3:55
3.	"Don't Know What You Got (Till It's Gone)"	5:56
4.	"The Last Mile"	3:51
5.	"Second Wind"	3:59

Side two
No.	Title	Length
6.	"Long Cold Winter"	5:24
7.	"If You Don't Like It"	4:10
8.	"Coming Home"	4:56
9.	"Fire and Ice"	3:22
10.	"Take Me Back"	3:17
Total length:		43:51

== Personnel ==
Cinderella

- Tom Keifer – electric, acoustic and steel guitars, harmonica, vocals, producer
- Jeff LaBar – guitar (lead guitar on "Falling Apart at the Seams" and "Coming Home")
- Eric Brittingham – bass, backing vocals, producer
- Fred Coury – drums (credited but does not play on the album)

Additional musicians

- Jay Levin – steel guitar
- Cozy Powell – drums on all tracks except 5
- Denny Carmassi – drums on track 5
- Rick Criniti – piano, organ, synthesizer
- Kurt Shore, John Webster – keyboards
- Paulinho Da Costa – percussion

Production

- Andy Johns – producer, engineer
- Thom Cadley – assistant engineer
- Ryan Dorn – overdubs engineer
- Steve Thompson, Michael Barbiero – mixing
- George Cowan – mixing assistant

== Charts ==
Chart (1988)	Peak position
Australian Albums (ARIA)	32
Canada Top Albums/CDs (RPM)	24
Finnish Albums (The Official Finnish Charts)	15
German Albums (Offizielle Top 100)	24
Japanese Albums (Oricon)	19
Norwegian Albums (VG-lista)	13
Swedish Albums (Sverigetopplistan)	38
Swiss Albums (Schweizer Hitparade)	7
UK Albums (Official Charts)	30
US Billboard 200	10

== Certifications ==
Region	Certification	Certified units/sales
Canada (Music Canada)	2× Platinum	200,000^{^}
Switzerland (IFPI Switzerland)	Gold	25,000^{^}
United Kingdom (BPI)	Silver	60,000^{^}
United States (RIAA)	3× Platinum	3,000,000^{^}
^{^} Shipments figures based on certification alone.

== Accolades ==
Publication	Year	Country	Accolade	Rank
Metal Rules	2003	US	Top 50 Glam Metal Albums	15
Rock Hard	2005	Germany	The 500 Greatest Rock & Metal Albums of All Time	457
L.A. Weekly	2011	US	Chuck Klosterman's Favorite Hair Metal Albums	9
Rolling Stone	2014	US	50 Rock Albums Every Country Fan Should Own	42
Rolling Stone	2019	US	50 Greatest Hair Metal Albums of All Time	10
