= Still Climbing (Cinderella album) =

Studio album by Cinderella
- Released: November 8, 1994
- Recorded: 1994
- Studios: Kajem Studios (Gladwyne, Pennsylvania); Devonshire Studios (Los Angeles)
- Genres: Hard rock; blues rock; glam metal
- Length: 53:27
- Label: Mercury
- Producers: Duane Baron, John Purdell, Tom Keifer

Cinderella chronology
| Heartbreak Station (1990) | Still Climbing (1994) |

Still Climbing is the fourth and final studio album by the American rock band Cinderella, released on November 8, 1994, by Mercury Records. It is the band's only album to feature drummer Kenny Aronoff, who replaced Fred Coury, although Coury did play drums on the album's final song "Hot & Bothered". The release of Still Climbing was delayed due to lead vocalist Tom Keifer losing his voice in 1991.

The album peaked at No. 178 on the Billboard 200.

== Background ==
Cinderella first performed "Talk Is Cheap" and "Freewheelin" during a show at the Empire Rock Club in Philadelphia in 1985. The version of "Talk Is Cheap" that the band performed in the 1980s is shorter in duration and performed at a faster tempo than the final version the band recorded for Still Climbing. Around 1985, prior to recording their first album Night Songs, the band also recorded a demo of "Talk Is Cheap."

"Hot & Bothered" had first appeared on Wayne's World: Music from the Motion Picture in 1992.

Stylistically, Still Climbing maintained the stripped-down, bluesy sound the band had begun exploring in their prior album Heartbreak Station. Bassist Eric Brittingham stated that he found it "refreshing" when people acknowledged the band's continued shift from glam metal to blues-based rock.

=== Songwriting and production ===
While the band was writing for and recording the album, Tom Keifer experienced vocal cord paresis, which he cited as an obstacle for his songwriting. The surgery and resultant recovery time forced the band into a two-year hiatus, which Brittingham cited as the reason it took the band so long to release the follow-up to Heartbreak Station. Keifer stated in a 2013 interview, "I am writing for the record, and I don't know what voice I am writing for because I don't know if I am going to have a voice." Keifer also stated, "I really didn't ever get to the point where my voice was fully retrained, back and functioning properly, even while we were recording that record."

Keifer explained that Still Climbing was difficult to record due to the band having to balance Keifer's vocal difficulties with pressure from their label to release new music. During the recording process, Keifer had to adopt a different recording technique and vocal technique from what he had grown accustomed to with the band's first three records: "The first three records, I would go in and sing it down on a few tracks, and Andy [Johns, the band's producer] and I would comp from a couple of tracks. Pretty standard procedure. Just sing the song from top to bottom a few times, then go in and edit from the best stuff. On Still Climbing, I was going in and singing one line over and over and over, and trying to get my pipes to work right and get the sounds that I wanted. It was just a weird record to make. It was not an easy record to make, but a lot of the songs, I really like. And you know, it is what it is."

== Critical reception ==
Professional ratings
Review scores
| Source | Rating |
|---|---|
| AllMusic | 3.5/5 stars |
| Calgary Herald | C |
| Collector's Guide to Heavy Metal | 7/10 |
| The Encyclopedia of Popular Music | 3/5 stars |
| Entertainment Weekly | B |
| The Indianapolis Star | 1.5/4 stars |
| MusicHound Rock: The Essential Album Guide | 2/5 stars |

The Encyclopedia of Popular Music called Still Climbing "a strong comeback." AllMusic deemed it "a gritty record that shows them building upon the bluesy hard rock of Heartbreak Station."

The Morning Call described the songs as "glossy blues- and pop-oriented heavy metal."

The Hamilton Spectator wrote: "While the music's hot, the messages are not. Keifer has simply run out of things to say aside from the coming-of-youth wisdom of 'The Road's Still Long'."

The Indianapolis Star wrote that the songs "are 90 percent chorus ('Hot & Bothered' and 'Freewheelin') - and not even particularly creative ones at that; they're just repetitive phrases that might manage to come off well with a concert crowd."

== Commercial performance and promotion ==
Still Climbing peaked at No. 178 on the Billboard 200.

In a February 1995 interview for Deseret News, the band's bassist, Eric Brittingham, said that one of the obstacles the band encountered while attempting to promote Still Climbing was the rock industry's shift away from glam metal bands; Brittingham recalled that while the band made plans to release music videos on MTV, MTV contacted the band's marketing director and informed them that "they've stopped playing our style of music."

In 2011, Brittingham stated in an interview that the low sales numbers of the record led to the band being dropped by their label, after which they temporarily disbanded.

== Track listing ==
All songs are written by Tom Keifer, except "The Road's Still Long" by Keifer and Andy Johns, and "Hot & Bothered" by Keifer and Eric Brittingham.

| No. | Title | Length |
|---|---|---|
| 1. | "Bad Attitude Shuffle" | 5:31 |
| 2. | "All Comes Down" | 5:04 |
| 3. | "Talk Is Cheap" | 4:00 |
| 4. | "Hard to Find the Words" | 5:45 |
| 5. | "Blood from a Stone" | 4:52 |
| 6. | "Still Climbing" | 5:22 |
| 7. | "Freewheelin" | 3:06 |
| 8. | "Through the Rain" | 5:07 |
| 9. | "Easy Come Easy Go" | 4:33 |
| 10. | "The Road's Still Long" | 6:05 |
| 11. | "Hot & Bothered" | 3:57 |

== Personnel ==
Cinderella

- Tom Keifer – vocals, guitar, piano, co-producer
- Jeff LaBar – guitar
- Eric Brittingham – bass
- Kenny Aronoff – drums

Additional musicians

- Fred Coury – drums on "Hot & Bothered"
- John Purdell – Hammond B3, piano, percussion, backing vocals
- Jay Davidson – tenor and baritone saxophones (tracks 2, 9)
- Steve Jankowski – trumpet and trombonium (track 2)
- Rosanna McNamara – fiddle/violin (track 4)
- Gary Corbett – keyboards (track 11)
- Annette Hardeman, Charlene Holloway – backing vocals (tracks 4 to 6)
- Luana Norman – backing vocals (track 10)
- Carla Benson, Evette Benton – backing vocals (track 11)

Production

- Duane Baron, John Purdell – producers, engineers, mixing at Unique Recording, New York
- Brian Stover, Eric Gobel – assistant engineers
- George Marino – mastering at Sterling Sound, New York

== Charts ==
| Chart (1994) | Peak position |
|---|---|
| Japanese Albums (Oricon) | 34 |
| Swiss Albums (Schweizer Hitparade) | 29 |
| UK Albums (Official Charts) | 88 |
| US Billboard 200 | 178 |
