= Mark Warner (guitarist) =

American songwriter

- Warner circa 2001

Background information
- Born: California; United States
- Genres: Rock; Pop
- Occupations: Musician; Songwriter; Producer
- Instruments: Guitar; Vocals

Mark Warner is a songwriter, studio musician and music producer from California.

Warner has received acknowledgement from the music industry for his songwriting contributions. In 2001 he won the Paramount Music Summer Songwriting Contest. He was also recognized for his lyrical accomplishments in the October 2001 edition of ASCAP Playback Magazine.

Warner credits several guitarists for providing his early musical influence, including Jimmy Page, Joe Perry and Peter Frampton. Later artistic influences include Tom Keifer and Jani Lane.

Warner is best known for his electric and acoustic work on the Allen Crane Broken Promises EP which was released on The Orchard Records in 2000 and features several artists including drummer Fred Coury.

Warner has since written material for, and co-produced other artists alongside former Sony Records veteran engineer and producer Voytek Kochanek at Atlantis Studio Nashville.
