= Allen Crane =

American rock band

- Guitarist Mark Warner

Allen Crane is an American rock band from Nashville, Tennessee. Allen Crane was formed by session guitarist Mark Warner. Warner is the sole lyrical and musical creative force of the band.

Allen Crane is best known for its line-up of veteran artists, which includes keyboardist Steve Rossi, bassist John Billings and Cinderella drummer Fred Coury. The Allen Crane debut Broken Promises EP was eventually released on The Orchard Records.

== Members ==
- Mark Warner - Guitars
- Glenn Ralph - Vocals
- Steve Rossi - Keyboards
- John Billings - Bass
- Fred Coury - Drums

== Discography ==
- Allen Crane: Broken Promises [EP] (c) 2000 Allen Crane Publishing ASCAP.
- Allen Crane: "Mama Said No" [CD single] (c) 2002 Allen Crane Publishing ASCAP.
- Allen Crane: The Unreleased Tracks (c) 2005 Allen Crane Publishing ASCAP.
- Allen Crane: Sticks and Stones (c) 2008 Allen Crane Publishing ASCAP.

== Videography ==
- Allen Crane: Hootie Hoo Hoo (c) 2001 Allen Crane Publishing ASCAP.
