= Still Climbing =

Still Climbing may refer to:

- Still Climbing (Brownstone album), a 1997 album by Brownstone
- Still Climbing (Cinderella album), a 1994 album by Cinderella
- Still Climbing (Leslie West album), a 2013 album by Leslie West, a founding member of American rock band Mountain
