= The Way Life Goes =

The Way Life Goes may refer to:

- The Way Life Goes (album), a 2013 album by Tom Keifer
- "The Way Life Goes" (song), a 2017 song by Lil Uzi Vert
