= Clifton Heights, Pennsylvania =

Borough in Pennsylvania, US

- Borough
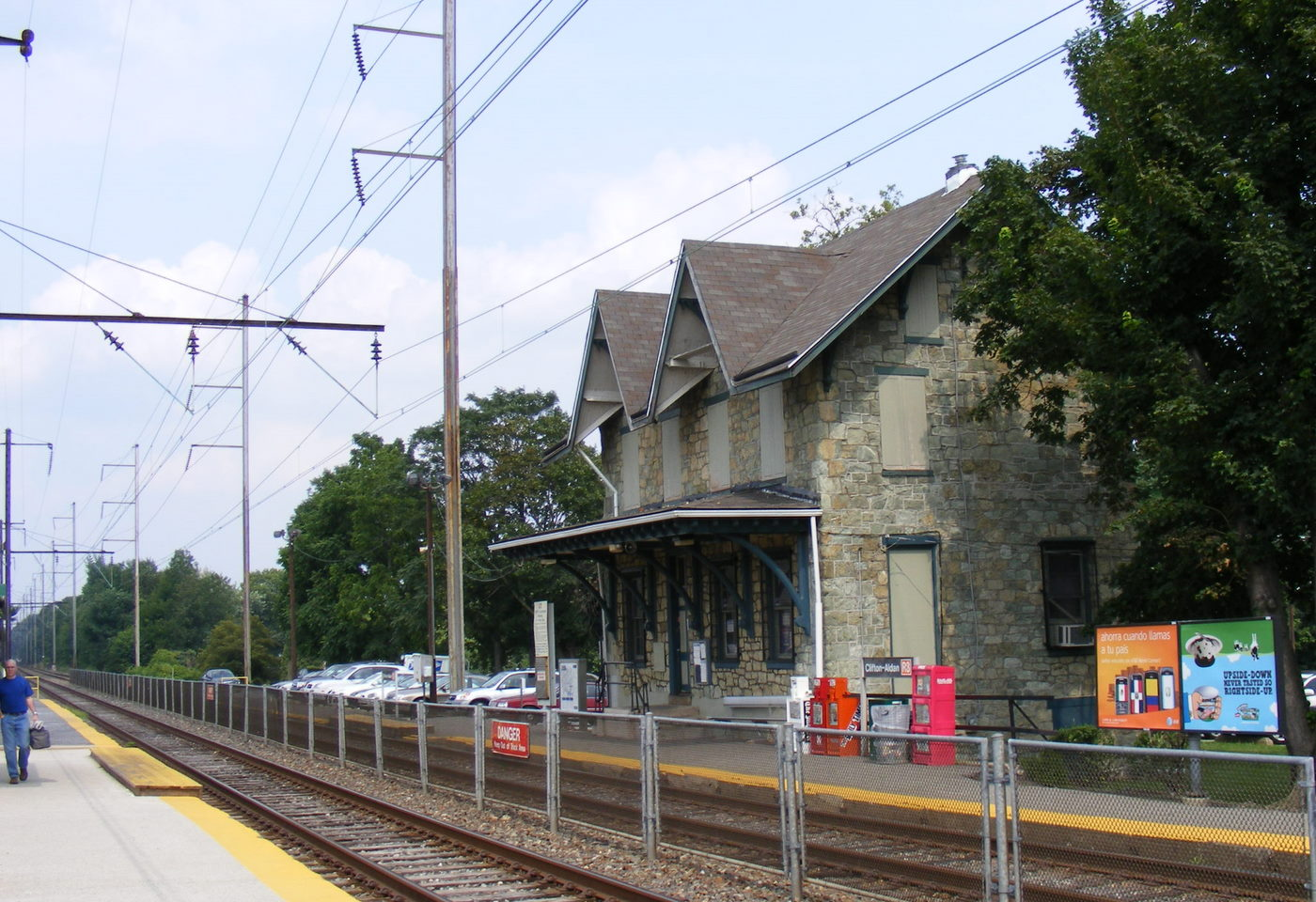
- The Clifton–Aldan station

- Location in Delaware County and the U.S. state of Pennsylvania.

- Location of Clifton Heights in Pennsylvania Clifton Heights (the United States)
- Coordinates: 39°55′45″N 75°17′45″W
- Country: United States
- State: Pennsylvania
- County: Delaware

Government
  - Mayor: Mary K. Dougherty

Area
  - Total: 0.63 sq mi (1.63 km^{2})
  - Land: 0.63 sq mi (1.63 km^{2})
  - Water: 0 sq mi (0.00 km^{2})
- Elevation: 157 ft (48 m)

Population (2020)
  - Total: 6,863
  - Density: 10,887.9/sq mi (4,203.85/km^{2})
- Time zone: UTC-5 (EST)
  - Summer (DST): UTC-4 (EDT)
- ZIP Code: 19018
- Area codes: 610 and 484
- FIPS code: 42-14264
- Website: cliftonheightspa.gov

Clifton Heights is a borough in Delaware County, Pennsylvania, United States, located on Darby Creek 5 miles (8 km) west of downtown Philadelphia. As of the 2020 census, the population was 6,863.

== History ==
The demographics of the greater Delaware Valley were significantly impacted by European colonization. By 1754, Native American populations in this region had been significantly displaced, however various uprisings of Native Americans were common throughout the region.

According to historian Freas B. Snyder, settlers set up a large tin kettle at a high point on what is now Oak Avenue, between Baltimore Avenue and Springfield Road. When hostile Indians were moving through the area, an alert would be sounded by banging on the tin kettle. This high point was called "Tin Kettle Hill" and would become a landmark used in three-point calculation surveying, along with a point in Central Philadelphia and a point on the Delaware River to the south.

The high point, Tin Kettle Hill, is believed to be the origin of "Heights" in the borough's name.

In 1839, Thomas Kent settled in the area and established the J. and T. Kent Company, which manufactured carpet yarn. The company's workers built houses throughout Clifton Heights, surrounding the Kent Mills factory. The original factory building and many of the millworker houses still exist today.

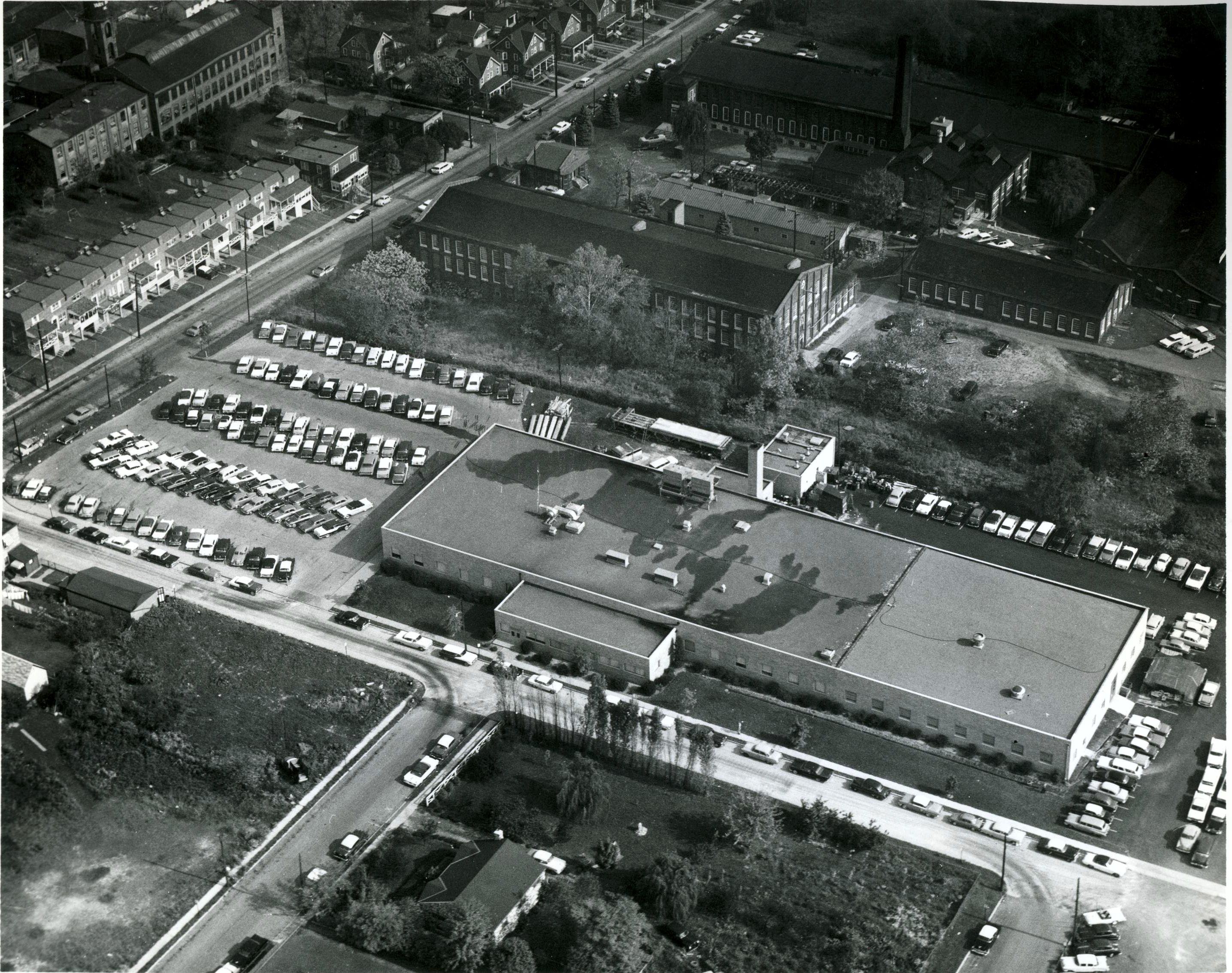
Aerial photograph of Clifton Heights from the early 1950s, showing Clifton Precision and Kent Mills industrial buildings.

In the early 1950s, Clifton Precision, a defense contractor, built a factory in Clifton Heights, designed by architect Nathan Cronheim. Completed in 1955, the company designed and manufactured motors and other electronic components out of the location. The company was later acquired by Litton Industries and operated until the late 1990s, when the property was sold and converted into offices and warehouse space.

The population of the borough was 1,820 in 1890, 3,155 in 1910, and reached a maximum of 10,268 in 1960.

Clifton Heights is the birthplace of the glam rock band Cinderella. Clifton Heights is the home of Rosati Water Ice, the nation's first Italian ice company, and the Slinky toy.

== Geography ==
Clifton Heights is located in eastern Delaware County at 39°55′45″N 75°17′45″W (39.929062, -75.295760). It is bordered to the northeast by the borough of Lansdowne, to the southeast by the borough of Aldan, and to the west, north, and southeast by Upper Darby Township.

Darby Creek runs along the borough's north and northeast border.

According to the United States Census Bureau, the borough has a total area of 0.62 square miles (1.6 km^{2}), all land.

== Transportation ==
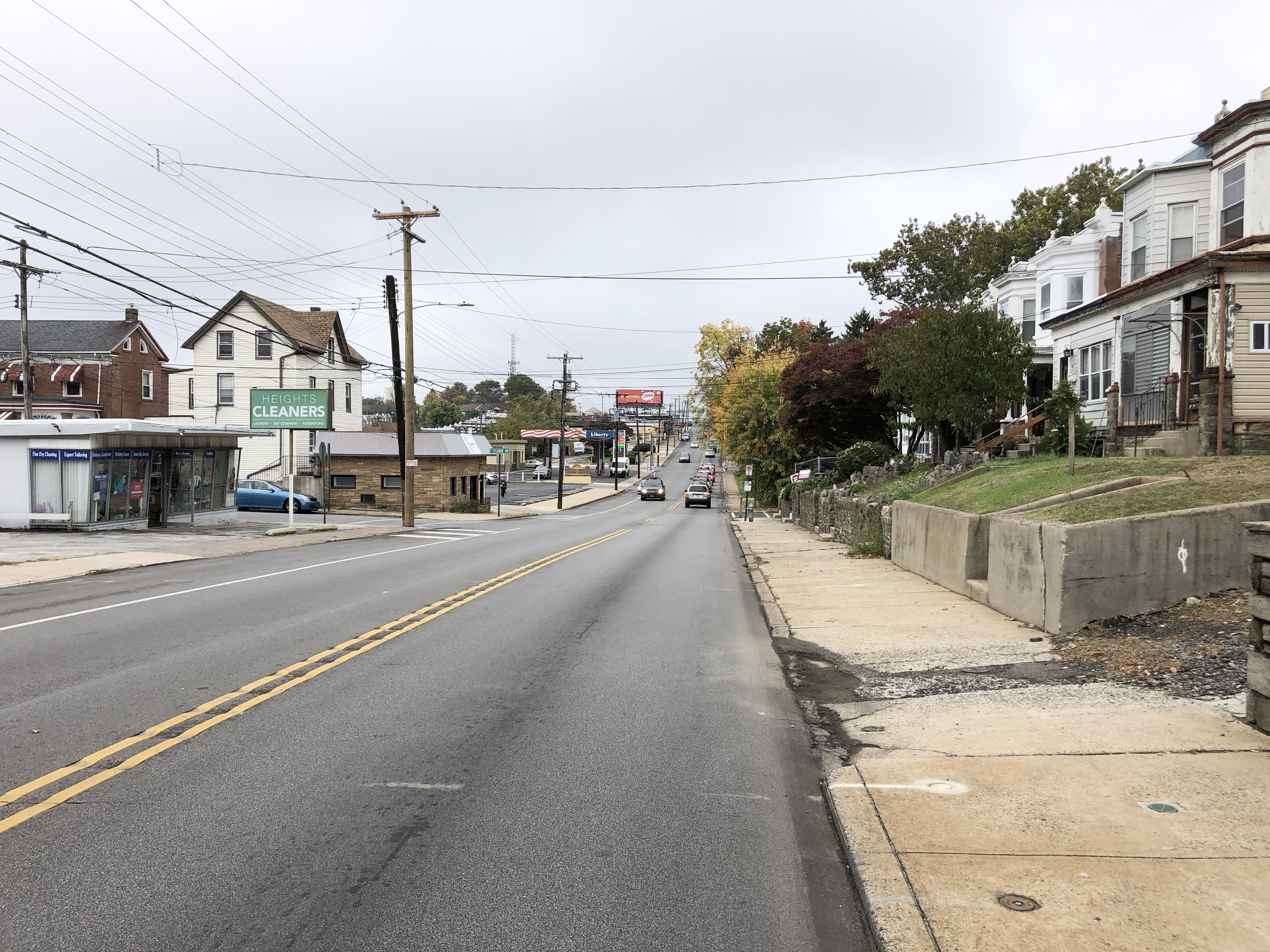
Baltimore Avenue in Clifton Heights

As of 2015, there were 12.51 miles (20.13 km) of public roads in Clifton Heights, of which 2.37 miles (3.81 km) were maintained by the Pennsylvania Department of Transportation (PennDOT) and 10.14 miles (16.32 km) were maintained by the borough.

No numbered highways serve Clifton Heights directly. The main thoroughfares include Baltimore Avenue, which follows a southwest-to-northeast alignment, and Springfield Road, which follows a northwest-to-southeast alignment. The two roads intersect near the center of the borough. Baltimore Avenue leads northeast into Philadelphia and southwest 5 miles (8 km) to Media.

== Demographics ==
Historical population
Census	Pop.	Note	%±
1890	1,820		—
1900	2,330		28.0%
1910	3,155		35.4%
1920	3,469		10.0%
1930	5,057		45.8%
1940	8,162		61.4%
1950	8,443		3.4%
1960	10,268		21.6%
1970	8,348		−18.7%
1980	7,320		−12.3%
1990	7,111		−2.9%
2000	6,779		−4.7%
2010	6,652		−1.9%
2020	6,863		3.2%

As of a Census 2015 estimate, the racial makeup of the borough was 67.6% non-Hispanic White, 21.4% African American, 6.9% Asian, 2.1% from other races, and 2.5% from two or more races. Hispanic or Latino of any race were 3.4% of the population. 14.5% of the borough's population was foreign-born .

As of the census of 2000, there were 6,779 people, 2,714 households, and 1,696 families residing in the borough. The population density was 10,882.5 inhabitants per square mile (4,201.8/km^{2}). There were 2,883 housing units at an average density of 4,628.2 per square mile (1,787.0/km^{2}). The racial makeup of the borough was 94.22% White, 2.92% African American, 0.06% Native American, 1.50% Asian, 0.38% from other races, and 0.91% from two or more races. Hispanic or Latino of any race were 0.99% of the population.

There were 2,714 households, out of which 31.1% had children under the age of 18 living with them, 42.9% were married couples living together, 14.3% had a female householder with no husband present, and 37.5% were non-families. 31.9% of all households were made up of individuals, and 12.8% had someone living alone who was 65 years of age or older. The average household size was 2.49 and the average family size was 3.20.

In the borough the population was spread out, with 25.8% under the age of 18, 7.9% from 18 to 24, 32.9% from 25 to 44, 18.6% from 45 to 64, and 14.9% who were 65 years of age or older. The median age was 36 years. For every 100 females there were 95.3 males. For every 100 females age 18 and over, there were 90.8 males.

The median income for a household in the borough was $39,291, and the median income for a family was $48,919. Males had a median income of $36,534 versus $32,210 for females. The per capita income for the borough was $20,534. About 11.2% of families and 11.1% of the population were below the poverty line, including 18.1% of those under age 18 and 6.4% of those age 65 or over.

== Education ==
Clifton Heights borough is served by the Upper Darby School District.

Most residents are zoned to Westbrook Park Elementary School, while some are zoned to Primos Elementary School. Clifton Heights Middle School opened in 2026. Residents are zoned to Upper Darby High School.

Previously residents were zoned to Drexel Hill Middle School.

== Notable people ==
- Lena Blackburne, baseball player, manager, inventor
- Eric Brittingham, bassist for the glam rock band Cinderella
- Jim Goad, author
- Johnny Hannon, racing driver
- Tom Keifer, singer-songwriter of the glam rock band Cinderella
- Dan Morgan, professional football player
- Vinnie Paz, rapper and record label owner
- Tom Savage, professional football player
