= Naked Beggars =

- Origin: Nashville, Tennessee, U.S.
- Genres: Glam metal; hard rock
- Years active: 1998–present
- Members: Kris Casamento; Eric Brittingham; Inga Brittingham; Dustin Delore
- Past members: Kristine Brasuell; Dustin Carpenter; Shawn Hughes; Lisa Rav; Jeff LaBar

Naked Beggars are an American glam metal band featuring former Cinderella bassist Eric Brittingham. The band was founded in 1998 by Brittingham's wife Inga along with Kris Casamento. Drummer Lisa Rav joined the group in September 2006; Dustin Carpenter has been the band's drummer since 2008. Naked Beggars have released two albums thus far: a self-titled debut in 2003, and the follow-up Spit It Out in 2005.

In April 2007, Jeff LaBar and his wife parted ways with Naked Beggars. LaBar died on July 14, 2021.
