= Somebody Save Me (Cinderella song) =

1987 song by Cinderella

Single by Cinderella

from the album Night Songs
- Released: April 1987
- Recorded: 1986
- Genre: Glam metal
- Length: 3:16
- Label: Mercury
- Songwriter(s): Tom Keifer
- Producer(s): Andy Johns

Cinderella singles chronology
| "Nobody's Fool" (1986) | "Somebody Save Me" (1987) | "Gypsy Road" (1988) |

"Somebody Save Me" is the third single from American glam metal band Cinderella's triple platinum album Night Songs. Released in April 1987, after Night Songs had already peaked at number 3, the song reached number 66 on the Billboard Hot 100 chart. Journalist Thom Jurek described the song as a "riotous call for free living no matter the consequences of the next day."

== Music video ==
The video shows the band at a studio then performing on stage. Later, they start dancing. At the end of the video, the band sees two groupies approach them but instead they go for Jon Bon Jovi and Richie Sambora who are right behind them.

The video was also featured on an episode of Beavis and Butthead.

== Charts ==
| Chart (1987) | Peak Position |
|---|---|
| US Billboard Hot 100 | 66 |
| US Mainstream Rock (Billboard) | 37 |
