= Unusual Suspects (Leslie West album) =

Studio album by Leslie West
- Released: September 19, 2011
- Studio: Americana Recording Studio, North Hollywood, California; Nightbird, West Hollywood, California; Noize Factor/Command recording, Valencia, California; Ocean Way, Hollywood, California; Showplace Studios, New Jersey
- Genre: Hard rock; blues rock
- Length: 47:48
- Label: Provogue

Leslie West chronology
Blue Me (2006)	Unusual Suspects (2011)	Still Climbing (2013)

Unusual Suspects is the eleventh studio album by American hard rock artist Leslie West. It was released on September 19, 2011, by Provogue Records. The album features several guest appearances, including Billy Gibbons, Slash, Zakk Wylde, Joe Bonamassa, and Steve Lukather.

Leslie West supported the album with a US tour.

== Reception ==
Professional ratings
Review scores
Source	Rating
AllMusic	3.5/5 stars
Blues Rock Review	9.5/10
Classic Rock	3/5 stars

Jason Bank of Blues Rock Review says the album has "no low points," and that "If you drop the needle on any and every point of the album you are sure to witness heavy and fun displays of blues inspired rock. Of the tracks that brandish guest stars, there isn’t one that doesn’t demand an immediate listen." Michael Popke of Goldmine calls the album "a proud mix of boogie blues and rock with a slew of guest guitarists."

== Track listing ==
No.	Title	Writer(s)	Length
1.	"One More Drink for the Road" (featuring Steve Lukather)	Leslie West, Joseph Pizza	3:14
2.	"Mudflap Mama" (featuring Slash)	Leslie West, Jennifer West-Weinsten	3:06
3.	"To the Moon" (featuring Billy Gibbons)	Leslie West, Del Bronham	4:51
4.	"Standing on a Higher Ground"	Leslie West, Billy Gibbons, Fabrizio Grossi	4:27
5.	"Third Degree" (featuring Joe Bonamassa)	Eddie Boyd, Willie Dixon	5:10
6.	"Legend"	Joseph Pizza	4:45
7.	"Nothing’s Changed" (featuring Zakk Wylde)
8.	"I Feel Fine"	John Lennon, Paul McCartney	2:57
9.	"Love You Forever"	Leslie West, Joseph Pizza	5:06
10.	"My Gravity"	Leslie West, Jon Tiven	4:23
11.	"Turn Out the Lights" (featuring Slash and Zakk Wylde)	Willie Nelson	3:21
12.	"I Don't Know (The Beetlejuice Song)^" (featuring Richard Christy and Lester "Beettle" Green)	Leslie West, Richard Christy, Lester "Bettle" Green	2:34
Total length:			47:48

^ Bonus track

== Personnel ==
The following personnel are credited on the album:

- Leslie West – guitar, vocals
- Fabrizio Grossi – bass
- Phil Parlapiano – keyboard
- David Briglin – piano, acoustic guitar
- Kenny Aronoff – drums
