= The Last Mile (song) =

Single by Cinderella

from the album Long Cold Winter
- B-side: "Long Cold Winter"
- Released: January 1989
- Genre: Glam metal; hard rock; blues rock
- Length: 3:51
- Label: Mercury
- Songwriter: Tom Keifer

Cinderella singles chronology
"Coming Home" (1989)	"The Last Mile" (1989)	"Shelter Me" (1990)

"The Last Mile" is the fourth single released from glam metal band Cinderella's second album, Long Cold Winter. It peaked at number 36 on the U.S. Billboard Hot 100 single chart in early 1989.

== Charts ==
Chart (1989)	Peak Position
Australia (ARIA)	155
US Billboard Hot 100	36
US Mainstream Rock (Billboard)	18
