= Heartbreak Station =

Studio album by Cinderella
- Released: November 20, 1990
- Recorded: 1990
- Studios: • Bearsville Studios (Woodstock, NY); • House of Music (West Orange, NJ); • Kajem Studios (Gladwyne, PA); • Studio in the Country (Bogalusa, LA)
- Genres: Hard rock; blues rock; glam metal
- Length: 52:42
- Labels: Mercury (USA); Vertigo (Europe)
- Producers: John Jansen & Tom Keifer

Cinderella chronology
| Long Cold Winter (1988) | Heartbreak Station (1990) | Still Climbing (1994) |

Singles from Heartbreak Station
- 1. "Shelter Me" Released: November 1990; 2. "Heartbreak Station" Released: March 1991

Heartbreak Station is the third studio album by American rock band Cinderella, released in 1990 through Mercury Records. It reached No.19 in the Billboard 200 US chart on December 21, 1990, and went platinum for shipping a million albums on February 26, 1991.

The music was described as "bluesy [and] brawny" by VH1.

Three singles were released, two of which charted on the Billboard's Hot 100 in 1991. "Shelter Me" peaked at No. 36 and the title track climbed to No. 44. "The More Things Change" did not chart.

It is the band's first & last album to feature drummer Fred Coury before he left the band the following year, although he did provide drums on one song on their next album Still Climbing.

== Background and production ==
Heartbreak Station marked a shift in the band's sound, wherein they moved further away from the glam metal style they had in Night Songs and Long Cold Winter and took a bluesier, stripped-down approach. In an interview with the Los Angeles Daily News a month before the album's release, when asked about the band's stylistic shift from their prior albums, lead vocalist Tom Keifer stated, "The sound has progressed from the last album. We produced it from a rawer, simpler approach. We stripped it down from a production standpoint, so there's not a lot of reverb or overdubs." Keifer also cited blues as a large influence on his songwriting in the album.

John Paul Jones, the former bassist of Led Zeppelin, arranged the strings for two songs on Heartbreak Station; the band requested Jones's help after they were impressed with orchestral arrangements Jones had contributed to songs by The Rolling Stones and Donovan.

In a retrospective interview with Classic Rock Revisited in 2013, Keifer reflected on his songwriting approach and his feelings towards the band's sound in Heartbreak Station, stating that, "We grew out of those '80s' processed slick things. That is the thing that was most intentional. Your writing and playing grows and grows, and it is organic, and it just happens." Keifer discussed his disillusionment with the polished sound of 80s rock that had been present on the band's prior records and that he instructed the album's mixing engineer, Michael Barbiero, to give the songs a rawer feel because "everybody was caught up in that whole '80s' sound. I told him it was time to do something different."

In 2017, Keifer gave an interview with a radio host working for the Detroit-based rock radio station WRIF wherein he stated, "In terms of production, which is something that is a learning experience as you go, of the Cinderella stuff, I think Heartbreak Station [is] my favorite because I just love how dry and how raw that record is. And we evolved into that sound, whereas the first two records were a little more 'flavor of the day' in the processing – you know, things were a little slicker and kind of processed in the '80s – and we evolved into this more organic, kind of dry, raw, real sound on Heartbreak Station." Keifer stated that the raw sound made it easier to feel "the emotion. . . . of the music and the players."

== Critical reception ==
Professional ratings
Review scores
| Source | Rating |
|---|---|
| AllMusic | 4/5 stars |
| Collector's Guide to Heavy Metal | 7/10 |
| LA Times | 2/5 stars |
| Rolling Stone | 3/5 stars |

In a positive review, Stephen Thomas Erlewine of AllMusic wrote, "Cinderella reached back into the Stones and Aerosmith songbooks and created a sneering, raunchy hard rock album that was artistically their finest moment, even if it didn't reach the same commercial heights as its predecessors."

The Chicago Tribune wrote a review that stated, "The band's new PolyGram Records album, Heartbreak Station, features more rootsy blues rock... . Yet despite Cinderella's blues leanings, critics often lump the group in with party bands like Poison and Warrant."

In a more negative review, the LA Times wrote, "Any band that can achieve a good approximation of the Stones' raw, cranking classic period--as Cinderella does here-- at least has the validity of a solid bar band. But Cinderella fails to justify and redeem its stylistic thefts by infusing a borrowed sound with a personal perspective."

People began their negative review with sarcasm, "The first thing that strikes you about this new album by Poison...er, uh, this new album by Cinderella...is how utterly original it is." They continue this theme throughout: "So as I was saying, you can't go wrong if you buy this new Mötley Crüe record. Ask for it by name."

In 2015, VH1 said the album was "the band’s masterwork—an eternally glimmering glass slipper of greatness."

== Track listing ==
All tracks are written by Tom Keifer except "Love's Got Me Doin' Time" written with Eric Brittingham.

| No. | Title | Length |
|---|---|---|
| 1. | "The More Things Change" | 4:17 |
| 2. | "Love's Got Me Doin' Time" | 5:15 |
| 3. | "Shelter Me" | 4:42 |
| 4. | "Heartbreak Station" | 4:27 |
| 5. | "Sick for the Cure" | 3:58 |
| 6. | "One for Rock and Roll" | 4:26 |
| 7. | "Dead Man's Road" | 6:30 |
| 8. | "Make Your Own Way" | 4:11 |
| 9. | "Electric Love" | 5:16 |
| 10. | "Love Gone Bad" | 4:14 |
| 11. | "Winds of Change" | 5:26 |

== Personnel ==
Track information and credits adapted from Discogs and AllMusic, then verified from the album's liner notes.

Cinderella

- Tom Keifer – vocals, electric guitar, 12 & 6 string acoustic guitar, mandolin, piano, lap steel guitar, mandocello, dobro, acoustic & electric slide guitar, producer
- Jeff LaBar – guitar, slide guitar
- Eric Brittingham – bass
- Fred Coury – drums, percussion, background vocals

Additional musicians

- Bashiri Johnson – percussion
- Jay Davidson – saxophone (tracks 1, 3, 10), piano (track 10)
- Rod Roddy – clavinet (track 2), piano (tracks 3, 4)
- Dennis Ruello – baritone saxophone (track 2)
- The Memphis Horns
  - Andrew Love – saxophone (track 2)
  - Wayne Jackson – trumpet (track 2)
- Jay Levin – pedal steel guitar (track 6)
- Ken Hensley – organ (tracks 5, 8, 10)
- Brian O'Neal – piano, organ (tracks 5, 8)
- Rick Criniti – keyboards (tracks 6, 7)
- John Avarese – synthesizer programming (track 9)
- Roy McDonald – synthesizer programming (track 11)
- John Paul Jones – string arrangements (tracks 4, 11)
- Elaine Foster, Sharon Foster, Tara Pellerin – background vocals (tracks 3, 4)
- Brenda King, Carla Benson, Curtis King, Evette Benton, Tawatha Agee – background vocals (tracks 5, 8)
- Eric Troyer – background vocals (track 10)

Production

- John Jansen – producer
- Gary Lyons – engineer
- Brian Stover, Nelson Ayres – assistant engineers (tracks 1 to 5, 8 to 11)
- Chris Laidlaw – assistant engineer (tracks 1, 5 to 7)
- Gene Foster, Jim Odom – assistant engineers (tracks 2 to 4, 11)
- Matthew "Boomer" Lamonica – assistant engineer (tracks 4, 9 to 11)
- Steve Thompson, Michael Barbiero – mixing
- George Cowan, Mike Reiter – mixing assistants
- Mitchell Kanner – art direction, design
- Scott Townsend – design
- Andrew Clatworthy, Mark "Weissguy" Weiss, Neil Zlozower, Robert John, William Hames, Ross Halfin – photography

== Charts ==
| Chart (1991) | Peak position |
|---|---|
| Australian Albums (ARIA) | 72 |
| Canada Top Albums/CDs (RPM) | 28 |
| Finnish Albums (The Official Finnish Charts) | 39 |
| German Albums (Offizielle Top 100) | 34 |
| Japanese Albums (Oricon) | 31 |
| Norwegian Albums (VG-lista) | 16 |
| Swedish Albums (Sverigetopplistan) | 42 |
| Swiss Albums (Schweizer Hitparade) | 8 |
| UK Albums (Official Charts) | 36 |
| US Billboard 200 | 19 |

== Certifications ==
| Region | Certification | Certified units/sales |
|---|---|---|
| Canada (Music Canada) | Platinum | 100,000^{^} |
| Japan (RIAJ) | Gold | 100,000 |
| Switzerland (IFPI Switzerland) | Gold | 25,000^{^} |
| United States (RIAA) | Platinum | 1,000,000^{^} |
^{^} Shipments figures based on certification alone.
