= Heavens Edge =

American glam metal band

- Origin: Philadelphia, Pennsylvania, U.S.
- Genres: Glam metal, hard rock, AOR
- Years active: 1987–1992, 1998–2002, 2013–present
- Labels: Columbia, MTM, Rock Candy, Frontiers
- Members: Mark Evans; Reggie Wu; David Rath; Steven Parry; Jaron Gulino
- Past members: George "G.G." Guidotti; Jimmy Marchiano; Toshi Iseda
- Website: heavensedge.net

Heavens Edge (also spelled Heaven's Edge) is an American glam metal band from Philadelphia, formed in 1987. They released a self-titled studio album in 1990 and Some Other Place, Some Other Time in 1998. The band reunited with all original members in 2013, and has played occasional shows since then as well as released a new album in 2023.

== History ==
Heavens Edge formed in 1987 in Philadelphia and was founded by guitarist Reggie Wu and singer Mark Evans. Heavens Edge released two albums: Heavens Edge (1990) for Columbia Records, that reached number 141 on The Billboard 200, and Some Other Place Some Other Time (1998) on MTM. Heavens Edge was produced by Neil Kernon. The band released a music video for their most popular single, "Skin to Skin".

One night while performing at the Empire Rock Club in Philadelphia, bassist George "G.G." Guidotti was shot in the abdomen by a disgruntled bar patron, angry about being turned away by the club bouncer.

After being dropped and successfully suing Columbia, Heavens Edge signed with Capitol and started recording their second album, also with producer Neil Kernon. The album was originally scheduled to be released in 1992 but Capitol opted not to release it. The album was not finished until 1998 when a couple of new songs were written and recorded. Parry was replaced first by Jimmy Marchiano and later briefly by Toshi Iseda on guitar.

After the band split, some of the band members formed the band American Pie with a new singer. American Pie recorded three demos and played live but never released an official album.

Heavens Edge signed a new record deal with MTM Records in 1998 and were asked to record a new album. Their second album, Some Other Place, Some Other Time, included both the second album sessions with Neil Kernon and the new 1998 songs, and was released by MTM Music in Europe, Pony Canyon in Japan, and Perris Records in the United States. The US version had a different cover and six additional demo tracks as bonus.

A year after the album's release, Heavens Edge was asked to record a song for the Mötley Crüe tribute album Kickstart My Heart (1999). The band recorded a cover of "Don't Go Away Mad (Just Go Away)".

In October 2013, a reunited Heavens Edge played the Firefest festival in Nottingham, England, a sold-out show in Philadelphia at World Cafe, as well as the M3 Festival in Maryland and MelodicRock Fest in Chicago in 2014.

Guidotti died from lung cancer on August 18, 2019.

The band announced Jaron Gulino as their new bassist on January 5, 2020.

In July 2021, guitarist Reggie Wu said the band was "just in talks" about a new album, and that he and lead singer Mark Evans were writing new songs.

On March 1, 2023, it was announced that Heavens Edge would be releasing an album on Frontiers Music titled Get It Right, which was released on May 12 of that year.

== Members ==
=== Current ===
- Reggie Wu – guitar, keyboards, piano, backing vocals (1987–1992, 1998–2002, 2013–present)
- Mark Evans – lead vocals, acoustic guitar, keyboards, piano (1987–1992, 1998–2002, 2013–present)
- David "Dave" Rath – drums (1987–1992, 1998–2002, 2013–present)
- Steven "Steve" Parry – guitar (1987–1991, 1998–2002, 2013–present)
- Jaron Gulino – bass guitar (2020–present)

=== Former ===
- George "G.G." Guidotti – bass guitar (1987–1992, 1998–2002, 2013–2019, his death)
- Jimmy Marchiano – guitar (1991)
- Toshi Iseda – guitar (1991–1992)

== Discography ==
=== Studio albums ===
Year	Album	US	Label
1990	Heavens Edge	141	CBS
1998	Some Other Place, Some Other Time	–	MTM
2023	Get It Right	–	MTM
2026	Philadelphia		

=== Singles ===
Year	Single	Chart positions		
Year	Single	US Hot 100	US Main Rock	UK
1990	"Skin to Skin"	–	–	–

=== Demos ===
- Heavens Edge (1989)

=== Other appearances ===
Year	Album	Label
1999	Kickstart My Heart: A Tribute to Mötley Crüe	Pulse
