= Shelter Me (song) =

Single by Cinderella

from the album Heartbreak Station
- Released: November 5, 1990
- Genre: Glam metal
- Length: 4:47
- Label: Mercury
- Songwriter: Tom Keifer

Cinderella singles chronology
"The Last Mile" (1989)	"Shelter Me" (1990)	"Heartbreak Station" (1991)

"Shelter Me" is a song by American rock band Cinderella. It serves as the lead single from the band's third studio album, Heartbreak Station. It peaked at #36 on the Billboard Hot 100.

== Music video ==
The music video features appearances by Little Richard, Shelley Duvall, Pamela Anderson, Dweezil Zappa, and Harry Shearer.

The video was named on the New York Times' list of the 15 Essential Hair-Metal Videos.

== Charts ==
Chart (1990–1991)	Peak position
Australia (ARIA)	48
Canada Top Singles (RPM)	27
UK Singles (Official Charts)	55
US Billboard Hot 100	36
US Mainstream Rock Airplay (Billboard)	5
US Cash Box Top 100	31
