= Night Songs (Cinderella album) =

1986 debut studio album by Cinderella

Studio album by Cinderella
- Released: June 9, 1986
- Recorded: 1985–1986
- Studios: Bearsville, Woodstock, New York; Kajem, Gladwyne, Pennsylvania; Warehouse, Philadelphia, Pennsylvania; Sigma Sound, Philadelphia, Pennsylvania; Sound Factory, Hollywood, California
- Genres: Glam metal; hard rock
- Length: 36:05
- Label: Mercury
- Producer: Andy Johns

Cinderella chronology
Night Songs (1986)	Long Cold Winter (1988)

Singles from Night Songs
- 1. "Shake Me" Released: June 1986; 2. "Nobody's Fool" Released: October 1986; 3. "Somebody Save Me" Released: April 1987

Night Songs is the debut studio album by American rock band Cinderella. It was released on June 9, 1986, by Mercury Records. Mercury issued the album worldwide, while Vertigo Records handled the album's release in the UK.

The album peaked at No. 3 on the US charts on February 7, 1987, and was certified double platinum for shipping 2 million copies. In May 1991, it was certified triple platinum, having shipped 3 million copies.

Leadoff single "Shake Me" failed to chart, but "Nobody's Fool" cracked the Top 20, reaching No. 13. Third single "Somebody Save Me" went to #66. On April 2, 1987, Cinderella filmed parts of their concert in Philadelphia. These live songs were, along with their three MTV videos, released on home video in August 1987 on Night Songs: The Videos.

Night Songs sold several million copies due to a combination of Cinderella's breakthrough single "Nobody's Fool", MTV airplay, and an opening slot on labelmates Bon Jovi's tour, in support of their album Slippery When Wet.

== Critical reception ==
Professional ratings
Review scores
Source	Rating
AllMusic	3/5 stars
Collector's Guide to Heavy Metal	6/10

The album received mixed reviews. David Fricke, writing for Rolling Stone magazine, considered that "[Cinderella] need to jazz up their material and cut away the clichés if they're really interested in hard-rock immortality. Otherwise, their platinum dreams are going to turn into pumpkins". AllMusic reviewer Steve Huey called it "not bad, just generic". Canadian journalist Martin Popoff put on a par Cinderella's rise to prominence with Poison's success, judging them as "little more than vacant, colourful but life-affirming [Mötley] Crüe derivatives." He described the songs as "heavier than one might expect, but of course safe, shallow and watery like the kiddie pool."

The album has been retrospectively considered a hair-metal classic, being ranked on a vast amount of "best of" lists. In 2015, "Sleazegrinder" of Louder included the song in his list of "The 20 Greatest Hair Metal Anthems Of All Time".

== Artwork ==
The album cover was photographed by Mark Weiss at the Head House in the New Market and Head House district in Philadelphia.

== Legacy ==
After the release of this album, the band slightly changed their sound to fit a more blues rock direction. In October 2014 for her birthday, guitarist Tom Keifer presented Lzzy Hale of Halestorm with the costume jewelry pin he wore on his right shoulder for the Night Songs album cover. Hale subsequently wore the pin on her right hip on the album cover for Halestorm's 2015 Into the Wild Life, to include a touch of tradition.

In 2015, "Sleazegrinder" of Louder included the song "Shake Me" in his list of "The 20 Greatest Hair Metal Anthems Of All Time", placing it at number 14. In 2018, Collin Brennan of Consequence included the album in his list of "10 Hair Metal Albums That Don’t Suck".

== Track listing ==
All songs written by Tom Keifer.

Side one
No.	Title	Length
1.	"Night Songs"	4:12
2.	"Shake Me"	3:44
3.	"Nobody's Fool"	4:49
4.	"Nothin' for Nothin'"	3:33
5.	"Once Around the Ride"	3:22

Side two
No.	Title	Length
6.	"Hell on Wheels"	2:49
7.	"Somebody Save Me"	3:16
8.	"In from the Outside"	4:07
9.	"Push, Push"	2:52
10.	"Back Home Again"	3:30
Total length:		36:05

== Personnel ==
Cinderella

- Tom Keifer – lead vocals, guitar, piano
- Jeff LaBar – guitar, vocals
- Eric Brittingham – bass, vocals
- Fred Coury – drums (does not play on the album, joined shortly after it was recorded)

Additional musicians

- Barry Benedetta – lead guitar on "Back Home Again", "Nothin' for Nothin'" and "Push, Push"
- Jeff Paris – keyboards
- Jody Cortez – drums on all tracks
- Tony Mills – background vocals
- Jon Bon Jovi – background vocals on "Nothin' for Nothin'" and "In from the Outside"
- Bill Mattson – background vocals on "Shake Me"

Production

- Andy Johns – producer, engineer, mixing at the Record Plant, Los Angeles
- David Glover, Joe Hauserman, Mark McKenna, Nick Didia, Paul Wertheimer – assistant engineers
- Mark "Weissguy" Weiss – photography/cover concept

== Charts ==
Chart (1986)	Peak position
Canada Top Albums/CDs (RPM)	15
Finnish Albums (The Official Finnish Charts)	27
US Billboard 200	3

Chart (2025)	Peak position
Greek Albums (IFPI)	37

== Certifications ==
Region	Certification	Certified units/sales
Canada (Music Canada)	Platinum	100,000^{^}
United States (RIAA)	3× Platinum	3,000,000^{^}
^{^} Shipments figures based on certification alone.

== Accolades ==
Publication	Year	Country	Accolade	Rank
Metal Rules	2003	US	Top 50 Glam Metal Albums	2
Metal Rules	2006	US	Top 10 One Album Heavy Metal Wonders	8
Guitar World	2008	US	Top 20 Hair Metal Albums of the Eighties	8
L.A. Weekly	2011	US	Top 20 Hair Metal Albums of All Time	11
Loudwire	2016	US	Top 30 Hair Metal Albums	7
Consequence of Sound	2018	US	10 Hair Metal Albums That Don't Suck	7
Rolling Stone	2019	US	50 Greatest Hair Metal Albums of All Time	18
