= Nobody's Fool (Cinderella song) =

Single by Cinderella

from the album Night Songs
- B-side: "Push, Push"
- Released: October 1986 (US); May 1987 (UK)
- Recorded: January 1986
- Genre: Glam metal
- Length: 3:46 (single); 4:49 (album)
- Label: Mercury
- Songwriter: Tom Keifer
- Producer: Andy Johns

Cinderella singles chronology
"Shake Me" (1986)	"Nobody's Fool" (1986)	"Somebody Save Me" (1987)

"Nobody's Fool" is a power ballad by American glam metal band Cinderella, released in 1986 as the lead single from the band's debut album, Night Songs. It charted at number 13 on the Billboard Hot 100 and also at number 25 on the Hot Mainstream Rock Tracks chart in 1987.

== Background ==
Singer Tom Keifer described "Nobody's Fool" as a "song for the falling out of love experience." He added, "And I would say that was not written for any one particular person. I'd been through that several times prior to writing that song. A lot of times, the emotions of songs are cumulative. That's not one particular experience, but the culmination of many."

== Music video ==
The music video continues the storyline from where the "Shake Me" video left off, following the Cinderella-like girl as she accompanies the band to their rehearsal space, with the wicked sisters in pursuit in their Autobianchi Bianchina. As the band performs the song, the girl runs home for the stroke of midnight when her rocker outfit changes back to a plain white dress. She later meets the band again for an autograph, and the video ends as a glint of recognition passes across Tom Keifer's face.

== Charts ==
Chart (1986–1987)	Peak Position
Canada Top Singles (RPM)	35
US Billboard Hot 100	13
US Mainstream Rock (Billboard)	25
