= Gypsy Road =

1988 single by Cinderella

Single by Cinderella

from the album Long Cold Winter
- Released: July 1988
- Recorded: 1987
- Genre: Glam metal; pop metal; hard rock; southern rock
- Length: 3:55
- Label: Mercury
- Songwriter: Tom Keifer

Cinderella singles chronology
"Somebody Save Me" (1987)	"Gypsy Road" (1988)	"Don't Know What You Got (Till It's Gone)" (1988)

"Gypsy Road" is a song by American rock band Cinderella, released in 1988 as the first single off their second album Long Cold Winter.

== Charts ==
Chart (1988–89)	Peak position
Canada Top Singles (RPM)	89
UK Singles (Official Charts)	54
US Billboard Hot 100	51
US Mainstream Rock (Billboard)	20
