= Coming Home (Cinderella song) =

Single by Cinderella

from the album Long Cold Winter
- B-side: "Take Me Back"
- Released: March 1989
- Genre: Glam metal; hard rock; blues rock
- Length: 4:56
- Label: Mercury
- Songwriter: Tom Keifer
- Producers: Andy Johns, Tom Keifer, Eric Brittingham

Cinderella singles chronology
"Don't Know What You Got (Till It's Gone)" (1988)	"Coming Home" (1989)	"The Last Mile" (1989)

"Coming Home" is a power ballad by American rock band Cinderella, released in 1988 as the third single off their second album Long Cold Winter. It uses a 12-string guitar and shows the band going in a more blues rock direction. The song was a US #20 hit, and was used in the TV series October Road.

== Charts ==
Chart (1989)	Peak Position
US Billboard Hot 100	20
US Mainstream Rock (Billboard)	13
