= Empire Rock Club =

Coordinates: 40.0408°N 75.0569°W

Empire Rock Club was a live music venue in Philadelphia, Pennsylvania and an important influence on the 1980s east coast glam metal music scene.

== History ==
Located at 7015 Roosevelt Boulevard, the Empire Rock Club was at the time of its opening, the only rock music venue in Northeast Philadelphia. In January 1985, the club began a metal music night every Sunday that was all ages. The night immediately became a success and helped start the careers of the bands Cinderella, Britny Fox, Heaven's Edge Tangier and the original Sik Viki featuring Buddy Blanchard!

The Empire Rock Club was owned by Rick Blatstein who also owned the Trocadero Theatre in Philadelphia.

Jon Bon Jovi, singer of the popular rock band Bon Jovi, discovered Cinderella at the club, introducing them to representatives of the music business. Cinderella went on to open for Bon Jovi's Slippery When Wet World Tour, helping to expose them to the public.

On November 28, 1986, the King Biscuit Flower Hour recorded a show at the venue by the band Til Tuesday for a later broadcast.

One night, a disgruntled patron who was turned away by a bouncer came back with a shotgun and shot the bassist George "G.G." Guidotti of the band Heaven's Edge in the abdomen.

The club closed in 1990. The building that once housed the Empire Rock Club is now home to a beer distributor, restaurant, Bingo Hall and furniture store.
