= Don't Know What You Got (Till It's Gone) =

1988 single by Cinderella

Single by Cinderella

from the album Long Cold Winter
- B-side: "Fire and Ice"
- Released: August 1988 (US); February 1989 (UK)
- Genre: Glam metal
- Length: 5:55
- Label: Mercury
- Songwriter: Tom Keifer
- Producers: Andy Johns, Cinderella

Cinderella singles chronology
"Gypsy Road" (1988)	"Don't Know What You Got (Till It's Gone)" (1988)	"Coming Home" (1989)

"Don't Know What You Got (Till It's Gone)" is a power ballad by American rock band Cinderella from their second album, Long Cold Winter. Written by frontman Tom Keifer, it was released in August 1988 and was their most successful single, peaking at number 12 on US Billboard Hot 100 in November 1988.

The music video for the song was filmed at Mono Lake in California and nearby Bodie State Historic Park. Among the buildings in Bodie seen in the video are the Methodist Church, the Hydroelectric Building, and the Standard Mill.

== Critical reception ==
Melody Maker and New Musical Express, British musical periodicals, reviewed the song ironically. The Stud Brothers (Melody Maker) first supposed that the band penned a Coca-Cola anthem. Simon Williams of NME, on the other hand, suggested that Kiefer's husky voice came from touring too much, implying the band needed a break.

== Chart performance ==
Chart (1988–1989)	Peak position
Australia (ARIA)	145
Canada Top Singles (RPM)	68
UK Singles (Official Charts)	54
US Billboard Hot 100	12
US Mainstream Rock (Billboard)	10
US Cash Box	17

== See also ==
- Boston by Augustana - A song whose music videos also features a piano being played next to water.
