= Jeff LaBar =

American guitarist (1963–2021)

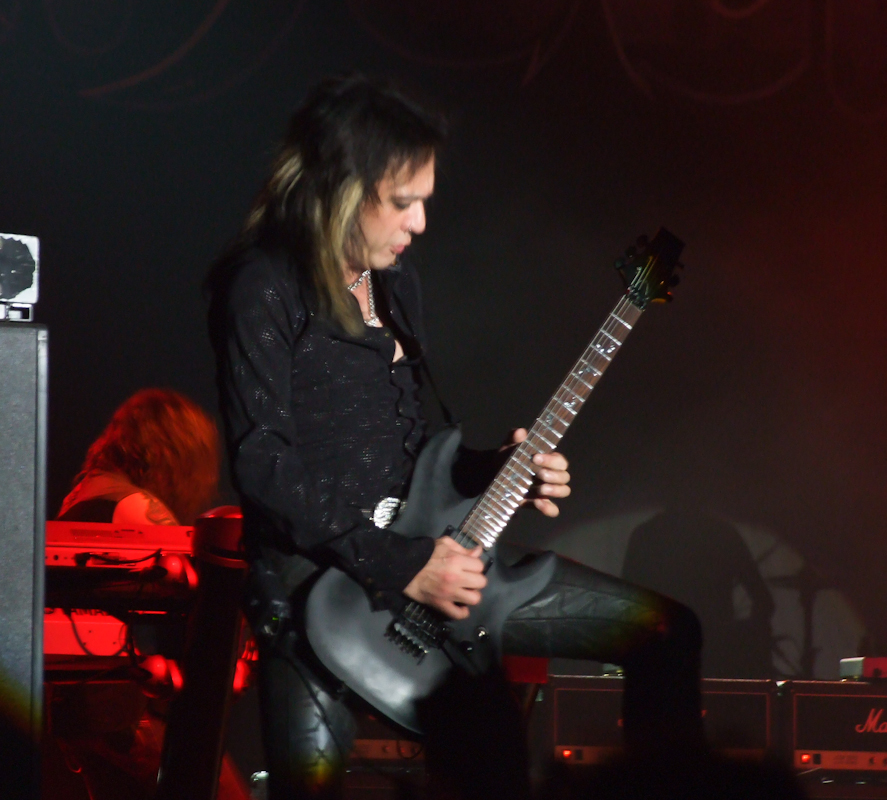
- LaBar in 2011

Background information
- Born: Jeffrey Philip LaBar; March 18, 1963
- Origin: Darby, Pennsylvania, U.S.
- Died: July 14, 2021 (aged 58) Nashville, Tennessee, U.S.
- Genres: Glam metal; hard rock; heavy metal
- Occupation: Musician
- Instruments: Guitar; bass; cello; keyboard; vocals
- Years active: 1985–2014
- Website: jefflabar.com cinderella.net

Jeffrey Philip LaBar (March 18, 1963 – July 14, 2021) was an American guitarist in the glam metal band Cinderella, in which he replaced original guitarist Michael Schermick.

== Career ==
LaBar was also in a side band with Cinderella bandmate Eric Brittingham called Naked Beggars. In April 2007, LaBar and his wife Debinique parted ways with Naked Beggars. Then Jeff recorded Freakshow in 2009 with Frankie Banali (Quiet Riot), and Tony Franklin (The Firm) along with singer/songwriter Markus Allen Christopher aka Ronnie Borchert (Miss Crazy). Jeff and Debinique also hosted an internet radio show "Late Night with the LaBar's" on Realityradio.biz.

In 2012, LaBar and Cinderella completed their 30th anniversary tour with fellow rock veterans Poison, who were also celebrating 30 years in the business. Jeff toured in support of his solo record with his son Sebastian and Jasmine Cain.

== Personal life ==
LaBar was born in Darby, Pennsylvania, and grew up in Upper Darby Township, just outside Philadelphia. LaBar had part Japanese ancestry via his mother June. He was inspired by his brother Jack LaBar to pick up the guitar.

LaBar had a son named Sebastian from a previous marriage. Sebastian is the lead guitarist in two bands, Mach22 and Tantric.

During Cinderella's temporary break-up in the mid-1990s, LaBar supported himself by running a pizza shop with his brother and by doing assorted construction jobs.

LaBar died on July 14, 2021, at the age of 58, from a heart attack, in Nashville, Tennessee. His wife Debinique Salazar discovered him unconscious in their Nashville apartment.

== Discography ==
=== Solo albums ===
- One for the Road (2014)

=== With Cinderella ===
- Night Songs (1986)
- Long Cold Winter (1988)
- Heartbreak Station (1990)
- Still Climbing (1994)

=== With Naked Beggars ===
- Naked Beggars (2003)
- Spit It Out (2005)

=== With Freakshow ===
- Freakshow (2009)
