= Eric Brittingham =

American bass guitarist

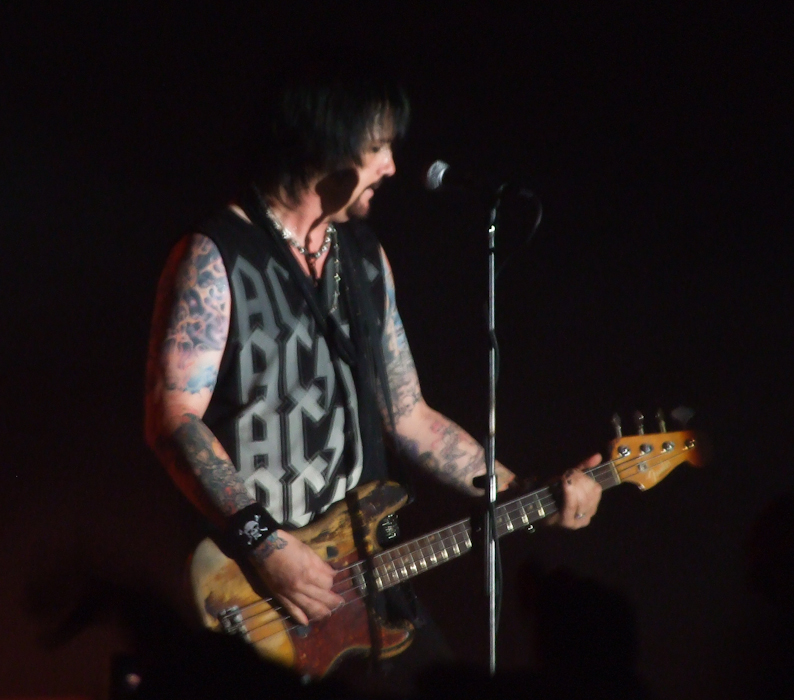

Background information
- Born: May 8, 1960 (age 66); Salisbury, England
- Genres: Glam metal; heavy metal; hard rock
- Occupation: Musician
- Instrument: Bass
- Years active: 1982–present

Eric Brittingham (born May 8, 1960) is an American bass guitarist best known for playing in the band Cinderella.

== Career ==
In 1983, Brittingham along with guitarist Tom Keifer founded the rock band Cinderella in Clifton Heights, Pennsylvania. Cinderella was signed to their first contract with Polygram in 1985 when they were seen performing at the Empire Rock Club in Philadelphia by Jon Bon Jovi who referred them to his agent.

Brittingham was also in a side-band, Naked Beggars, with his (ex)wife Inga and Cinderella bandmate Jeff LaBar.

Brittingham also played with Let It Rawk, a revolving door "super-group" featuring musicians from the 1980s rock music scene such as Jaime St. James (Black 'N Blue, Warrant), Oz Fox (Stryper), Scot Coogan (Lynch Mob) and Stacey Blades (LA Guns).

In 2009, Brittingham temporarily filled-in for Poison bassist Bobby Dall on Poison's Summer 2009 tour with Def Leppard when Dall became sick on tour.

On April 19, 2013, Brittingham played bass guitar in Rock Island, IL at Martini's on the Rock for The Dirties.

In 2014 Brittingham co-formed the new rock supergroup Devil City Angels and played on the band's self-titled debut album released in 2015. After the first album, Brittingham left the band and was replaced by Rudy Sarzo of Quiet Riot.

Currently, Brittingham plays bass in the Bret Michaels Band.

== Personal life ==
Brittingham is divorced from INGA Brittingham. They have two daughters together. Eric Brittingham suffered a 'mild heart attack' in mid-December 2006.
