= Tom Keifer =

American rock musician

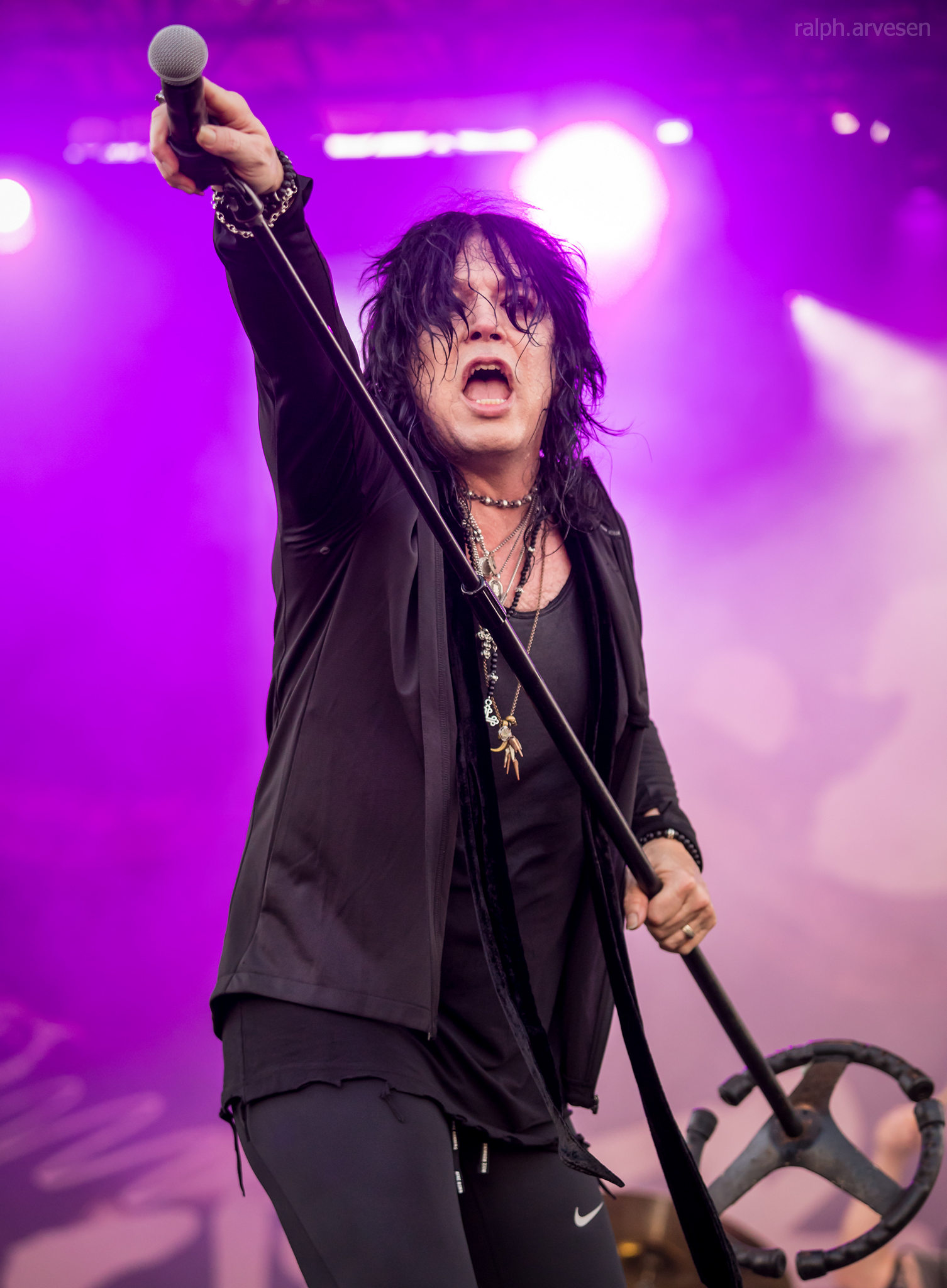
- Keifer performing in 2018

Background information
- Born: Carl Thomas Keifer; January 26, 1961 (age 65); Springfield, Pennsylvania, U.S.
- Genres: Hard rock; blues rock; glam metal
- Occupations: Singer; musician; songwriter
- Instruments: Vocals; guitar; keyboards; saxophone; harmonica
- Years active: 1982–present
- Labels: Mercury; Cleopatra
- Formerly of: Cinderella
- Website: www.tomkeifer.com

Carl Thomas Keifer (born January 26, 1961) is an American musician. He is the lead singer, primary songwriter, and one of the guitarists for the hard rock band Cinderella.

Keifer's vocals are described as "raspy [and] skyscraping". Ultimate Classic Rock said his vocals "sound like the result of gargling motor oil before hitting the vocal booth". He is considered by some to be among the greatest glam metal vocalists.

== Early life ==
Tom Keifer is a native of Springfield, Pennsylvania. He grew up in a musical family and began playing guitar at a young age. He soon discovered and loved Blues music and was heavily influenced by it.

Keifer joined his first rock band while attending Springfield High School. He soon learned to play the electric guitar. The young musician struggled with drug and alcohol abuse in high school, and considered dropping out of school to pursue a music career. However, his mother Adrienne bribed her son to stay in school by promising him a Gibson Les Paul guitar upon graduation. Keifer graduated and received the coveted instrument.

== Early career ==
Soon, Keifer conquered his addictions, and began to focus on a career as a musician. He had started writing original material. He also found financial support by walking race horses at tracks and delivering film to developing outlets, and for a time was a member of a Central Pennsylvania band named Telapath. Keifer came closer to his dream of being a successful artist by forming the hard rock band Cinderella with good friend and bassist Eric Brittingham. Despite being shy, Keifer took on the role of lead singer because they could not find anyone they liked to sing for the band. In articles, Keifer has said, "I don't feel comfortable when I'm up there singing and not playing guitar. I feel naked when it's just me and the microphone."

=== Discovery ===
Cinderella was discovered initially by Gene Simmons of Kiss who unsuccessfully attempted to get the band signed.

It was then that Jon Bon Jovi in 1985, at the Empire Rock Club in Philadelphia, Pennsylvania, convinced his Mercury A&R manager Derek Schulman to sign the band. Bon Jovi has been quoted as saying, "I saw Tommy Keifer onstage delivering some pretty nifty, growling vocals. Then he whipped out this Les Paul and proceeded to lay into some astounding sounds. This guy struck me as a star right then and there."

Keifer and company experienced much success with their albums, Night Songs, Long Cold Winter, and Heartbreak Station. Keifer enjoyed the reputation of being a prolific songwriter with hits such as "Shake Me", '"Nobody's Fool", "Gypsy Road", "Don't Know What You Got (Till It's Gone)", "Coming Home", "Shelter Me", and "Heartbreak Station".

== Later years ==
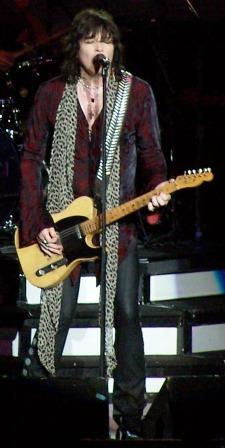
Keifer performing in 2006

After the Heartbreak Station tour Keifer lost his voice and was diagnosed with paralysis of the left vocal cord. In 1994, Cinderella released their fourth album, Still Climbing. It received little attention, and the band broke up in 1995.

Keifer continued to undergo surgeries on his vocal cords. He also battled depression. He was forced to learn how to sing again because of the paralysis of his left cord, but he eventually began working on material for a solo album. He married his current wife, Savannah Keifer nee Snow and settled in Nashville, Tennessee, where he continued to work on his solo album. The album was put on hold after Cinderella reunited in 1997 and toured in 1998. They signed with Sony Music, but were dropped a few years later. They released a greatest hits album, Once upon a… and a live album, Live at the Key Club. Cinderella toured the United States in 2000 and again in 2002.

Keifer has a daily regimen, including warm-ups and exercises, that may last longer than some of his shows; however, Keifer feels that he has his condition "under control."

=== Touring ===
Cinderella was the headliner of the 2005 Rock Never Stops Tour. Keifer and Cinderella completed their 20th anniversary tour with fellow rock veterans Poison in 2006, who were also celebrating twenty years in the music business. The tour was a rousing success and swiftly became one of the most successful tours of 2006, averaging about 12,000 people in attendance per night.

Cinderella had planned to tour in 2008 with Warrant, Lynch Mob, and Lynam. Unfortunately the tour had to be postponed after Keifer's left vocal cord hemorrhaged again, thereby making it impossible for him to sing in the immediate future. Keifer has recently worked with country artist Andy Griggs. He also appeared on an episode of Extreme Makeover, where he helped a fan write a song. Keifer has finished his solo album, which was released on April 30, 2013.

As of May 2, 2013, Keifer has been touring his solo album The Way Life Goes, moving from California, across the Midwest, culminating in Chicago. The tour also visited many countries, including Russia.

On Sunday July 22, 2017, Keifer was an act featured in Loud-N-Lima's 3-Day Music Festival in Lima, Ohio fеaturing many artists from the hair metal era's peak.

== Present-day ==
In a November 23, 2009, interview with Metalzone, Keifer said that while Cinderella never disbanded, they were on a hiatus due to his vocal problems and required rehabilitation.

"I thought that I was there in the summer of 2008 for the tour for the States here, and we ended up having to cancel that tour because I re-injured my voice. Since then I've been working on trying to get it strong again, which I am glad to say it's very strong now and we're looking to be back out on the road in 2010." When asked about his solo record, (as of April 2010) he said "It’s pretty much finished. I’m booking a mastering date, probably in May sometime, before we hit the road for the summer. Then I will be looking for a label for it". When asked about the possibility of a new Cinderella record, Tom said it is probable but the band would need to be all in for it, and the record label would need to be for it.

In 2013, Keifer discussed the progress of his solo album, and was quoted saying the following: "The idea for a solo record started in the Nineties when the band parted ways and we left Universal," said the frontman. "There was just a changing of the guard in the industry at that time and I started thinking about a solo record. I wrote for it for many years and the songs just kept going on the pile and I never got around to actually making a record... We started cutting tracks for this record in 2003 and I went to the pile of songs that had been building up and picked some that I liked and I've just been working on it ever since. It was produced independently of a label, because the idea from the beginning was to just work and record until I was happy with it. I wrote with a lot of different people – my wife, Savannah, who's a great writer, co-wrote a lot of the songs on the record and also co-produced the record with me, and a good friend of ours, Chuck Turner, who's a great engineer and producer. So from the beginning, the attitude was, 'Let's have fun and just make a great record and it'll be done when it's done.' Little did we know it'd be nine years later... it's done and we went through some crazy stuff and mixed and remixed and reworked things over and over and probably made a lot of mistakes along the way, but finally got it where we were all happy with it, so here it is."

== Personal life ==
Keifer is married to singer-songwriter Savannah Snow. In February 2004, their first child was born.

== Discography ==
=== Solo ===
- The Way Life Goes (2013)
- Rise (2019)

Singles

- "The Flower Song" (2013)
- "Solid Ground" (2013) (promotional single only)
- "The Way Life Goes" (2013)
- "The Death of Me" (2019)
- "Rise" (2019)

=== With Cinderella ===
- Night Songs (1986)
- Long Cold Winter (1988)
- Heartbreak Station (1990)
- Still Climbing (1994)
