= Fred Coury =

American drummer

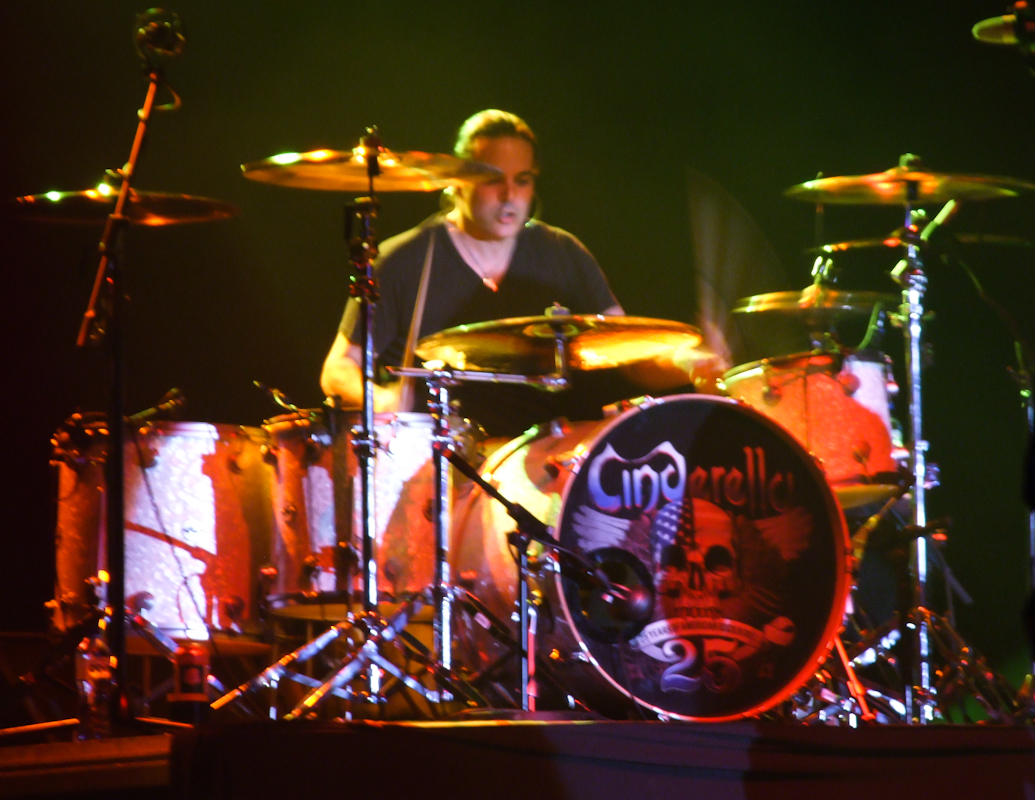
- Coury performing in 2011

Background information
- Born: October 20, 1967 (age 58); Johnson City, New York, U.S.
- Genres: Glam metal; hard rock; heavy metal
- Occupation: Drummer
- Years active: 1984–present
- Website: doublefortemusic.com cinderella.net

Fred Coury (born October 20, 1967) is an American musician best known as the drummer for the glam metal band Cinderella. Coury lists Neil Peart, Peter Criss, Bobby Blotzer, John Bonham, Eric Carr, Tommy Lee and Tommy Aldridge as his drumming inspirations.

== Early years ==
Coury was born in Johnson City, New York, to a Lebanese family. At age 5, Coury started taking violin lessons. At age 6 he participated in his first public performance. Between the ages of 7 and 9 he studied at the Beirut Conservatory of Music in Beirut, Lebanon. At age 10, he added the trumpet to his repertoire. Finally, at age 12 he started to play the drums. By the age of 13, he was playing local bars with the band Sunjammer. As a teen, Coury was accepted to Berklee School of Music in Boston, for violin.

== Career ==
Coury has played in other bands including London and Chastain and was playing with Ozzy Osbourne in 1985 filling-in for Randy Castillo who had a leg injury, before he joined Cinderella. Coury got into Cinderella when Eric Singer told him about the gig and encouraged him to audition. Coury sent in a cassette and because as far as everyone knew, according to Circus magazine, he was the drummer for Osbourne, that may have helped him score an audition.

Coury left Cinderella in 1991 and joined Stephen Pearcy of Ratt to form the band Arcade. He also briefly substituted for Guns N' Roses drummer Steven Adler in December 1987 when health issues forced Adler off the road. Coury re-joined Cinderella after Arcade folded. In the summer of 2006, Coury and Cinderella joined Poison on a joint 20th anniversary tour. Coury also filled in for Rikki Rockett during Poison's slot at the Comstock Rock Festival on July 15, 2009, due to the fact that Rockett having had baby the day before, and in 2017 he filled for Night Ranger when his friend Kelly Keagy took a brief leave from tour.

Coury spends most of his time in his Los Angeles recording studio Double Forte Music composing for television and sports. A multi-award-winning composer, Coury has scored all four seasons of NBC's hit series The Night Shift, WGN America's original series Almost Paradise, Coury composed and created the original musical score for the 2019 feature film Full Count. An avid hockey fan, Coury combined his love of the sport with his musical skills to create the "Goal Song" and sonic identity for the Los Angeles Kings hockey team. In 2017, The L.A. Kings series Black & White, which Coury scores, was nominated and won an Emmy Award. He also provides the sonic identity for the Portland Trail Blazers NBA team, with whom he won a second Emmy award.

== Other interests ==
In his spare time Coury enjoys storm chasing. He is also a part-time actor and has appeared in several films such as The Human Race or The Junkyard Willie Movie: Lost in Transit. Coury performs mixes for his dance/electronica group called Effcee. Coury is an avid NASCAR fan and can often be seen on "pit road" alongside the crews.

Coury is also passionate about rescuing animals.

== Discography ==
- 1985 Mystery of Illusion: Chastain – drums
- 1990 Heartbreak Station: Cinderella – percussion, drums, background vocals
- 1990 Leader of the Banned: Sam Kinison – drums
- 1992 Caught in the Middle: Linear – drums
- 1992 L.A. Blues Authority: L.A. Blues Authority – drums, vocals, performer
- 1993 Arcade: Arcade – drums
- 1994 A/2: Arcade – Drums, background vocals
- 1994 Jack Daniel's Tour: 1988 Guns N' Roses – drums
- 1995 Stairway of Gold: Songs of the Sephardim: Judy Frankel – tambourine, handclapping
- 1997 Looking Back: Cinderella – producer, engineer, mixing
- 1997 Love Is Suicide: Marshall Coleman – percussion, drums, background vocals
- 1997 Once upon A...: Cinderella – Producer
- 1999 Live at the Key Club: Cinderella – drums
- 1999 Asylum Suite: Asylum Suite – background vocals, producer
- 2000 Before and Laughter: Stephen Pearcy – Drums
- 2000 Cheap Dream: A Tribute to Cheap Trick: Various artists – remixing
- 2000 Remixed to Hell: AC/DC Tribute: Various artists – remixing
- 2000 Todd Rundgren: Reconstructed: Todd Rundgren – remixing
- 2000 Broken Promises EP: Allen Crane – drums, percussion
- 2001 A/3: Live & Unreleased: Arcade – drums, percussion, background vocals
- 2001 Dance Mixes: Tavares – remixing
- 2001 Love Machine Remixed Hits: The Miracles – remixing, mixing
- 2002 Rock Tribute to Guns N' Roses: Various Artists – liner notes, mixing
- 2002 Somebody Loves You Back: The Mixes: Teddy Pendergrass – Remixing
- 2002 Tribute to Linkin Park: Various Artists – Mixing
- 2002 Tribute to Marilyn Manson Various Artists – Bass, Guitar, Programming, Vocals
- 2003 Greatest Classics: With a Twist: Todd Rundgren – Remixing
- 2004 Blackest Album, Vol. 4: An Industrial Tribute: Various Artists – Producer, Mixing
- 2004 Destroy All DJs, Vol. 2: B.P. vs. Effcee – Engineer, Digital Editing
- 2004 Destroy All DJs: B.P. vs. Effcee – Pro-Tools
- 2004 Gothic Acoustic Tribute to Disturbed: Various Artists – Producer
- 2004 Greatest Hits: Love TKO: Teddy Pendergrass – Remixing
- 2004 In Concert: Cinderella – Drums, Vocals, Group Member
- 2004 Live from the Gypsy Road: Cinderella – Drums, Vocals, Group Member
- 2004 Making Tributes Is Easy: The Ultimate Tribute to Radi: Various Artists – Producer
- 2004 More '80s Hair Metal: Various Artists – Producer
- 2004 Perfect: Effcee – Programming, Producer, Mixing, Group Member
- 2004 Rock vs. Rap: Various Artists – Producer
- 2004 The Roots of Guns N' Roses: Hollywood Rose – Remixing
- 2004 Spin the Bottle: an All-Star Tribute to Kiss: Various Artists – Drums
- 2004 Trancemixed Anthems, Vol. 1: Various Artists – Mastering
- 2004 Tribute to Incubus [Tributized]: Various Artists – Producer
- 2004 Tribute to White Stripes: Various Artists – Producer, Remixing
- 2004 Unclean [Bonus DVD]: Pitbull Daycare – Programming, Vocals, Producer, Mixing
- 2004 Voodoo Magick: The Godsmack Tribute: Various Artists – Producer
- 2005 Best of Club Hits, Vol. 3: Various Artists – Mastering
- 2005 Clubmixed, Vol. 2: Various Artists – Mastering
- 2005 Destination Lounge: Bali [Bonus DVD]: Various Artists – Mastering
- 2005 Greatest Hits Remixed: Marilyn Monroe – Remixing
- 2005 In Concert [DVD]: Cinderella – Group Member
- 2005 Maximum Workout, Vol. 2: Various Artists – Mastering
- 2005 Revive the Soul: Various Artists – Mastering
- 2005 Rocked, Wired & Bluesed: The Greatest Hits: Cinderella – Drums, Percussion, Background Vocals
- 2005 Rocked, Wired & Bluesed: The Greatest Video Hits: Cinderella – Drums, Percussion, Background Vocals
- 2005 Soul Sauce: Various Artists – Mastering
- 2005 Ultimate Tribute to Radiohead: Various Artists – Producer
- 2005 Ultimate Tribute to U2: Various Artists – Producer
- 2005 Best of Club Hits, Vol. 3: Various Artists – Mastering
- 2005 Clubmixed, Vol. 2: Various Artists – Mastering
- 2005 Destination Lounge: Bali: Various Artists – Mastering
- 2005 Electro Goth Tribute to Prince: Various Artists – Producer
- 2005 Everything in Between: The Numb Ones – Background Vocals, Producer, Mixing
- 2005 Genius Remixed [Hypnotic]: Ray Charles – Remixing
- 2005 Greatest Hits Remixed: Marilyn Monroe – Remixing
- 2005 In Concert [DVD]: Cinderella – Drums, Group Member
- 2005 Revive the Soul: Various Artists – Mastering
- 2005 Rocked, Wired & Bluesed: The Greatest Hits: Cinderella – Percussion, Drums, Background Vocals, Group Member
- 2005 Rocked, Wired & Bluesed: The Greatest Video Hits: Cinderella - Percussion, Drums, Background Vocals, Group Member
- 2005 Soul Sauce: Various Artists – Mastering
- 2005 Ultimate Tribute to U2: Various Artists – Producer
- 2006 '80s Metal Hits: Various Artists – Producer
- 2006 All Star Tribute to Bon Jovi: Various Artists – Producer
- 2006 Extended Versions: Cinderella – Drums, Background Vocals
- 2006 Gold: Cinderella – Percussion, Drums, Background Vocals
- 2006 Gothic Divas Presents Switchblade Symphony: Various Artists – Producer
- 2006 Gypsy Road: Live: Cinderella – Group Member
- 2006 World's Greatest Metal Tribute to Led Zeppelin: Various Artists – Drums, Mixing
- 2007 Heavy Metal Box [Rhino]: Various Artists – Drums
- 2007 Heavy Metal [Box Set]: Various Artists – Drums
- 2007 Too Fast for Love: A Millennium Tribute to Mötley Crüe: Various Artists – Engineer, Drum Programming, Mixing, Drum Producer
- 2008 Cinderella: Live in Concert: Cinderella – Drums, Vocals, Group Member
- 2009 Already There: Debbie Gibson – Drums, Producer, Mixing
- 2008 Under My Skin: Stephen Pearcy – Drums, Drum Engineering, Musician
- 2009 '80s Metal: A Double Dose: Various Artists – Drums, Producer
- 2009 80s Hair Metal Goes Classic: Various Artists – Drums, Mixing
- 2009 Authorized Bootleg: Live at the Tokyo Dome: Cinderella – Drums, Group Member
- 2009 Lou Gramm Band: Lou Gramm – Mixing
- 2009 Spectacular! (Music From the Nickelodeon Original Movie Original TV Soundtrack) – Drums
- 2009 Hannah Montana: The Movie – Drums
- 2009 High School Musical 3 – Drums
- 2011 Sacha Baron Cohen's The Dictator – Drums
- 2012 Ubisoft's Just Dance 4 – Drums
- 2019 Fast & furious presents: Hobbs & Shaw – Drums
