= The Anthology (Autograph album) =

Compilation album by Autograph
- Released: 2011
- Recorded: 1983, 1988–1989, 2003
- Genres: Glam metal, hard rock
- Length: 2:12:36
- Label: Cleopatra Records

Autograph chronology
More Missing Pieces (2003)	The Anthology (2011)	Louder (2015)

The Anthology is the only compilation album by American glam metal band Autograph. Released as a two-disc set in 2011, it is a digital remaster of two Autograph albums, Missing Pieces and Buzz.

The first disc, reissued as "Studio Demos 1983-1988", is a remastered combination of Missing Pieces and the 2003 reissue More Missing Pieces, while the second disc is the digital remaster of Buzz, reissued as Buzz and Beyond with two additional versions of "Turn Up the Radio", a re-recorded version (listed as "alternate electric/re-recorded version") which was first featured on Steve Plunkett's My Attitude album and an acoustic version listed as "unplugged".

== Track listing ==
Disc 1: Studio Demos 1983-1988
No.	Title	Length
1.	"Turn Up the Radio" (demo version)	4:46
2.	"Send Her to Me" (demo version)	4:56
3.	"Nighteen and Nonstop" (demo version)	4:42
4.	"Deep End" (demo version)	4:07
5.	"Friday" (demo version)	4:50
6.	"All I'm Gonna Take" (demo version)	6:01
7.	"Cloud 10" (demo version)	3:46
8.	"In the Night" (demo version)	4:25
9.	"Angel in Black" (demo version)	3:50
10.	"All Night Long"	3:58
11.	"Heartattack"	4:03
12.	"When I'm Gone"	4:22
13.	"I've Got You"	4:32
14.	"One-Way Dead-End Street"	3:51
15.	"Sanctuary"	4:36
16.	"Sweet Temptation"	3:48
17.	"Love Comes Easy"	3:48
18.	"Angela"	4:53

Disc 2: Buzz & Beyond
No.	Title	Length
1.	"Break a Sweat"	4:12
2.	"Shake the Tree"	4:28
3.	"She's the Reason"	4:29
4.	"Fed Up with Bein' Down"	4:22
5.	"That"	5:07
6.	"Party Like We Did"	4:07
7.	"Buzz"	4:47
8.	"Like It Hot"	4:03
9.	"Heart Raper"	5:04
10.	"Can't Stop Rockin'"	4:18
11.	"Turn Up the Radio" (unplugged)	4:03
12.	"Turn Up the Radio" (alternate electric version)	4:22
