= Jailhouse (band) =

American glam metal band

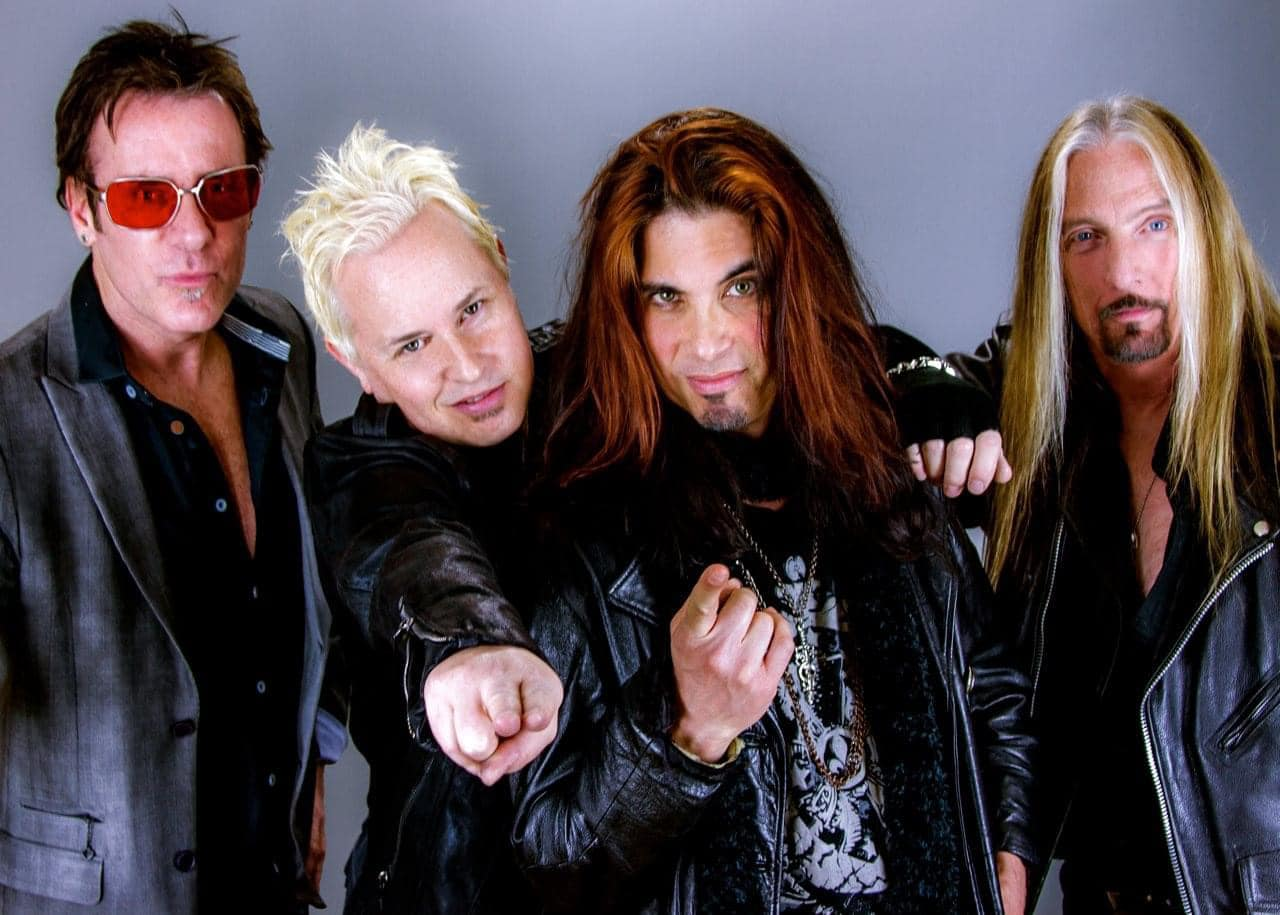
- Jailhouse in 2013

Background information
- Origin: Los Angeles, California, U.S.
- Genres: Glam metal, hard rock
- Years active: 1987–1988, 1988–1991, 2010–2013
- Labels: Restless, DeRock, Demon Doll
- Spinoff of: Rough Cutt
- Members: Simon Daniels; Michael Raphael; Dave Alford; Matt Thorr
- Past members: Amir Derakh; Brian Scott; Mark Vernon
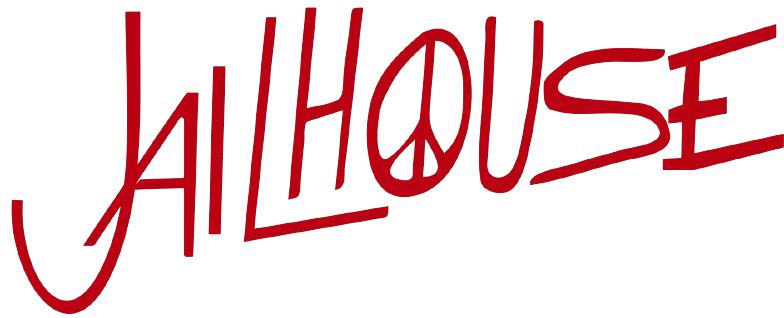

Jailhouse is an American glam metal band from Los Angeles. Formed in 1987, they released a live EP, Alive in a Mad World, on Restless Records in 1989, and their debut full-length album, Jailhouse, in 1998. The band never achieved mainstream recognition compared to many other glam metal bands. However, the members subsequently gained fame in other acts, such as Simon Daniels with Autograph, Amir Derakh with Dead by Sunrise, Julien-K and Chester Bennington, Michael Raphael with Neve, and Matt Thorr with Stephen Pearcy and Tuff.

Jailhouse’s latest lineup, featured four of the five original members, performing at the 2013 Monsters of Rock Cruise, included vocalist Simon Daniels, drummer Dave Alford, guitarist Michael Raphael, bassist Matt Thorr.

== History ==
=== Formation (1987) ===
The first ever Jailhouse lineup consisted of, drummer, Mark Vernon, guitarist, Michael Raphael, vocalist, Simon Daniels and bassist Brian Scott. Raphael's plan with his previous band, You Talk We Talk was to take this band and relocate to Los Angeles following the trail of his childhood friend, "Faster Pussycat" guitarist Greg Steele. In 1987, Michael Raphael moved to Los Angeles, but the guys in the band decided to stay behind. When Michael moved, he met Simons with drummer, Mark Vernon and as well as Brian Scott to form the first Jailhouse lineup, this lineup never got far, so shortly after, Jailhouse disbanded. In 1988, Simon Daniels was suggested to check out Rough Cutt by drummer, Dave Alford, due to Paul Shortino leaving Rough Cutt and joining Quiet Riot, Simon joined and suggested to reform and restart Jailhouse with this new formation, alongside guitarist, Michael Raphael from the original lineup of Jailhouse. This is the most recognized Jailhouse lineup. Featuring vocalist Simon Daniels, guitarist Amir Derakh, drummer Dave Alford, guitarist Michael Raphael and bassist Matt Thorr. Derakh, Alford, and Thorr were previously in another glam metal band, Rough Cutt.

=== First album (1988–1989) ===
Jailhouse released its mini live debut EP Alive in a Mad World in 1989, recorded and performed live at the Roxy Club in Hollywood, under Restless Records. It consisted of four live tracks including a cover of Jailbreak by Thin Lizzy and one acoustic track.

The band gained regional popularity on the Sunset Strip scene. Though they did not achieve mainstream success, Alive in a Mad World received moderate attention, which led to airplay on MTV's Headbangers Ball with their songs "Please Come Back" and "Modern Girl".

=== Reunion (2010–2013) ===
In 2010, the band reunited to release a compilation album/studio album, Straight at the Light, through Demon Doll Records, featuring both old material and a newly recorded track. Jailhouse reunited once again in 2013 to perform as part of the Monsters of Rock cruise, bringing the classic lineup back together for the special event. However, Derakh chose not to take part in the reunion, leaving the band to carry on the shows without him. In 2020, Jailhouse released an archive album with their demo and unreleased tracks.

== Band members ==
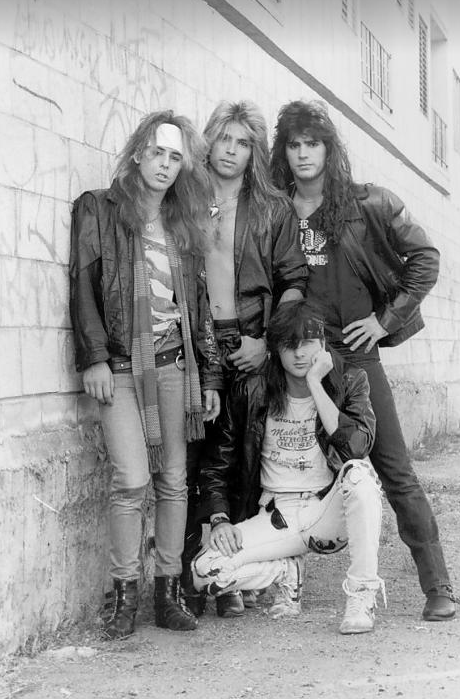
Jailhouse's first lineup from 1987 to 1988

Current lineup

- Dave Alford – drums, backing vocals (1988–1991, 2010–present)
- Simon Daniels – lead vocals, rhythm guitar (1987–1991, 2010-present)
- Matt Thorr – bass guitar, backing vocals (1988–1991, 2010–present)
- Michael Raphael – lead and rhythm guitar, backing vocals (1987–1991, 2010–present)

Former members

- Amir Derakh – lead guitar, keyboards, backing vocals (1988–1991, 2010)
- Brian Scott – bass guitar, backing vocals (1987–1988)
- Mark Vernon – drums, backing vocals (1987–1988)

== Discography ==
=== Studio albums ===
- Jailhouse (1998)

=== Live albums ===
- Alive in a Mad World (EP, 1989)

=== Compilation albums ===
- 3rd Strike (2008)
- Straight at the Light (2010)
- Please Come Back (2012)
- Demo Tapes 1989–1990 (2020)
