= In Your Direction (album) =

Live album by Mickey Ratt
- Recorded: 1981
- Genre: Glam metal

In Your Direction is a Mickey Ratt live recording at the Cellar Garage in Culver City, CA in 1981.

== Track list ==
1. In Your Direction
2. Rockin' For You
3. Never Use Love
4. Dr. Rock
5. Cry In Time
6. Ain't Gonna Be Your Fool
7. Bad Reputation
8. Fallen Angel
9. Top Secret
10. Your Only Age
11. U Got It

== Personnel ==
- Stephen Pearcy: Lead vocals
- Jake E. Lee: Lead guitar
- Bob DeLellis: Rhythm guitar, Backing vocals, Lead guitar on "Fallen Angel"
- Matt Thorr: Bass
- Dave Alford: Drums, Backing vocals
