= Anthology (Rough Cutt album) =

Compilation album by Rough Cutt
- Released: 2008
- Recorded: 1984–1987
- Genre: Heavy metal, glam metal
- Label: Deadline/Cleopatra

Rough Cutt chronology
Sacred Place (2002)	Anthology (2008)

Anthology is a collection of previously unreleased Rough Cutt material.

The Fiddler's Studio Sessions were recorded before the band's first album was recorded.

An earlier version of "Try a Little Harder", with Craig Goldy on guitar, was released on the KLOS 95 1/2: Rock to Riches compilation in 1983. The song "Prowler" was re-recorded for inclusion on Rough Cutt Live as one of 3 studio bonus tracks.

"Dreamin' Again", "Try a Little Harder", "Crank It Up" and "Street Gang Livin'" were all performed live on the 'Rock Palace' TV show, taped on January 1, 1984, at the Hollywood Palace, now the Avalon Hollywood.

== Track list ==
=== Disc 1 ===
==== Fiddler's Studio Sessions 1984 ====
1. Take Her
2. Stranger/Dressed to Kill
3. Dreamin' Again
4. Cutt Your Heart Out
5. You Keep Breaking My Heart
6. Take It or Leave It
7. Queen of Seduction
8. Try a Little Harder
9. Crank It Up
10. Prowler
11. Street Gang Livin'
12. Motive for Love

==== 1987 Sessions ====
1. Bad Boys
2. Hold On
3. You Want It You Got It

=== Disc 2: Live Syracuse September 17, 1985 ===
1. Cutt Your Heart Out
2. Kids Will Rock
3. Never Gonna Die
4. Dressed to Kill
5. She's Too Hot
6. Black Widow
7. Take Her
8. Drum Solo
9. Don't Settle for Less
10. Try a Little Harder
11. Piece of My Heart

== Credits ==
- Paul Shortino: Lead Vocals
- Amir Derakh: Guitar
- Chris Hager: Guitar
- Matt Thorr: Bass
- Dave Alford: Drums
