= The Garage Tape Dayz 78–81 =

The Garage Tape Dayz 78-81

Compilation album by Mickey Ratt
- Released: 2000
- Recorded: 1978–1981
- Label: Top Fuel Records
- Producer: Stephen Pearcy

The Garage Tape Dayz 78–81 is a compilation album of Mickey Ratt demos recorded between 1978 and 1981.

The lineup of Pearcy, Hager and Jellison on Bass, and Turner on Drums on "City To City" was the first to perform as Ratt but they would change it back to Mickey Ratt. The lineup featuring Pearcy, Jake E Lee, Matt Thorne, Dave Alford, & Bob DeLellis would be the last Mickey Ratt lineup before again shortening the name to Ratt for good in 1981.

Robbin Crosby was the first 'classic' member to join Pearcy.

Guitarists Jake E. Lee and Chris Hager, bassist Matt Thorne, and drummer Dave Alford went on to the band Rough Cutt.

Drummer Bob Eisenberg went on to become a member of an early line-up of Keel under the name Bobby Marks.

== Track listing ==
1. Ratt Madness (Pearcy)
2. Railbreak (Pearcy)
3. Out Of The Cellar (Pearcy)
4. Bad Dogs (Pearcy)
5. Terror On The Midway (Pearcy)
6. Top Secret-Original Version (Pearcy)
7. Drivin' On E (Pearcy)
8. Dr. Rock (Pearcy)
9. Magnetic Telescopes (Pearcy/Hager)
10. City To City-Original Version (Pearcy)

ALL Songs by: SEP Muzik 1976-2020/B.M.I.

== Personnel ==
- Stephen Pearcy: Lead Vocals, Main songwriter on all songs, Lead Guitar on 5, Rhythm Guitar on 1–4, 7–10
- Chris Hager: Guitar on 1–5, 7–10
- Jake E. Lee: Lead Guitar on 6
- Dave De Ellis (possibly a misprint of Bob DeLellis): Rhythm Guitar on 6
- Tim Garcia: Bass 1–5, 7–9
- Matt Thorr: Bass on 6
- Dave Jellison: Bass on 10
- Bob Eisenberg: Drums on 1–3, 5, 9
- John Turner: Drums on 4, 7–8, 10
- Dave Alford: Drums on 6
