= Simon Daniels (musician) =

Brazilian musician

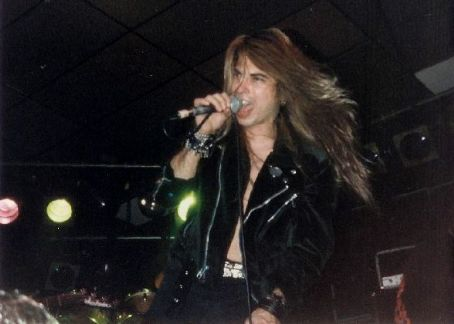
- Simon in 1989

Background information
- Also known as: Danny Simon
- Born: June 24, 1964 (age 62); Rio de Janeiro, Brazil
- Genres: Glam metal; hard rock; arena rock
- Occupation: Musician
- Instruments: Vocals; guitar
- Years active: 1985–present
- Member of: Autograph Beyond
- Formerly of: Agent X; Jailhouse; Flood; Autograph

Simon Daniels (born Danny Simon; June 24, 1964) is a Brazilian musician, best known as the lead singer and rhythm guitarist for American glam metal band Autograph. Daniels replaced original Autograph frontman Steve Plunkett after he decided not to participate in a 2013 band reunion.

== Career ==
Daniels moved from Brazil to Los Angeles in 1985 and shortly after formed the band Agent X with guitarist Billy D'Vette (Pair-A-Dice). They recorded Rock n Roll Angels with Kim Fowley (Kiss, Runaways). After Agent X's disbandment, Daniels reached out to Mark Vernon, Brian Scott and Michael Raphael to form the first lineup of Jailhouse. Following this, Daniels was offered to join Rough Cutt and then merged Rough Cutt members Dave Alford, Amir Derakh and Matt Thorr to reform Jailhouse with Michael Raphael from the first lineup. In the mid-90s, Daniels formed a band called Flood that signed to Interscope Records, produced by Bob Marlette and Terry Date. In 2013, the band Jailhouse did a reunion show on the Monsters of Rock cruise, and later that year, Daniels was asked to join Autograph as Steve Plunkett was not interested in doing a reunion tour.

== Discography ==
=== Agent X ===
- Rock n Roll Angels (1985)

=== Jailhouse ===
- Alive in a Mad World (1989)
- Jailhouse (1997)
- 3rd Strike (2008)

=== Flood ===
- Flood (1997)

=== Autograph ===
- Louder (2016)
- Get Off Your Ass (2017)
- Beyond (2022)
