= In Your Direction =

In Your Direction may refer to:

- In Your Direction (album), an album by Ratt
- "In Your Direction", a song by Ratt from their second album Out of the Cellar
