= Simon Daniels =

Simon Daniels may refer to:

- Simon Daniels (cricketer)
- Simon Daniels (musician)
