= That's the Stuff =

Studio album by Autograph
- Released: October 14, 1985
- Recorded: 1985
- Studios: Record Plant, Los Angeles
- Genres: Hard rock, glam metal
- Length: 40:12
- Label: RCA
- Producers: Autograph, Eddie DeLena

Autograph chronology
Sign In Please (1984)	That's the Stuff (1985)	Loud and Clear (1987)

Singles from That's the Stuff
- 1. "Blondes in Black Cars" Released: 1985; 2. "That's the Stuff" Released: 1985; 3. "We're an American Band" Released: 1985

Professional ratings
Review scores
Source	Rating
AllMusic	2/5 stars
Classic Rock	6/10 stars

That's the Stuff is the second studio album by the American rock band Autograph, released in 1985 by RCA Records. The album featured the singles "That's the Stuff" and "Blondes in Black Cars".

A different version of the album was reissued in 1986, featuring a blue cover with different artwork. This version featured a cover of Grand Funk Railroad's "We're an American Band" replacing "Six String Fever" as track 6.

A remastered version of the original album with the red cover was released by Spitfire Records in 2002, which retained the same track listing as the original, apart from the substitution of "Six String Fever" with "We're an American Band" as track number 6. Since its remastered release in 2002, the CD has become extremely rare. The album was again reissued in 2009 by the British record label Rock Candy. This time, the remastered CD featured the ten original tracks (including "Six String Fever") and "We're an American Band" as a bonus track. The booklet features the original red cover.

== Track listing ==
Side one
No.	Title	Writer(s)	Length
1.	"That's the Stuff"	Keni Richards, Randy Rand, Steve Lynch, Steve Plunkett, Steven Isham	4:24
2.	"Take No Prisoners" (included in the soundtrack of the movie The River Rat)	Mike Post, Plunkett	3:56
3.	"Blondes in Black Cars"	Richards, Plunkett	4:16
4.	"You'll Get Over It"	Douglas Foxworthy, Richards, Plunkett	3:27
5.	"Crazy World"	Lynch, Plunkett	4:36

Side two
No.	Title	Writer(s)	Length
6.	"Six String Fever"	Lynch, Plunkett	4:35
7.	"Changing Hands"	Foxworthy, Plunkett	4:51
8.	"Hammerhead"	Lynch	1:38
9.	"Built for Speed"	Richards, Rand, Lynch, Plunkett, Isham	3:37
10.	"Paint This Town"	Richards, Plunkett	4:51
Total length:			40:12

2009 Rock Candy Remastered Edition bonus track
No.	Title	Writer(s)	Length
11.	"We're an American Band" (Grand Funk Railroad cover)	Don Brewer	3:44

== Personnel ==
Autograph

- Steve Plunkett – lead vocals, rhythm guitar
- Steve Lynch – lead guitar, backing vocals
- Randy Rand – bass, backing vocals
- Steven Isham – keyboards, backing vocals
- Keni Richards – drums

Production

- Eddie DeLena – producer, engineer
- Craig Engel – engineer
- Tom Treumuth – basic tracks producer
- Dave Wittman – mixing
- Stephen Marcussen – mastering at Precision Lacquer, Hollywood
- Neil Zlozower – photography

== Charts ==
Chart (1985)	Peak position
US Billboard 200	92
