= Rough Cutt (album) =

Studio album by Rough Cutt
- Released: February 11, 1985
- Recorded: 1984
- Studios: Record Plant, Los Angeles, California
- Genres: Heavy metal; glam metal
- Length: 42:17
- Label: Warner Bros.
- Producer: Tom Allom

Rough Cutt chronology
Rough Cutt (1985)	Wants You! (1986)

Singles from Rough Cutt
- 1. "Never Gonna Die" Released: 1985; 2. "Piece of My Heart" Released: 1985

Professional ratings
Review scores
Source	Rating
AllMusic	4/5 stars
Collector's Guide to Heavy Metal	5/10

Rough Cutt is the debut studio album by American heavy metal band Rough Cutt, released in 1985. It was produced by Tom Allom, who is most famous for producing Judas Priest.

The song "Take Her" was co-written by Ronnie James Dio and ends with a tribute to the famous tune In The Hall of the Mountain King originally written by classical Norwegian composer Edward Grieg. The songs "Dreamin' Again" and "Black Widow" were co-written by Wendy Dio, Ronnie's wife and also the band's manager at the time. "Piece of My Heart" was originally performed by Erma Franklin, though Janis Joplin made it famous, and many people mistakenly believe Janis Joplin was the original performer of the song. "Never Gonna Die" was written by vocalist Mark Gable and guitarist Brad Carr whose band The Choirboys scored a minor hit with it in 1983. The single peaked at No. 21 on the Australian charts.

== Track listing ==
Side one

1. "Take Her" (Chris Hager, Matt Thorr, Paul Shortino, Dave Alford, Craig Goldy, Ronnie James Dio) - 3:39
2. "Piece of My Heart" (Bert Berns, Jerry Ragovoy) - 4:44 (Erma Franklin cover)
3. "Never Gonna Die" (Brad Carr, Mark Gable) - 4:21 (The Choirboys cover)
4. "Dreamin' Again" (Alford, Hager, Thorr, Shortino, Wendy Dio) - 5:34
5. "Cutt Your Heart Out" (Hager, Thorr, Shortino) - 2:28

Side two

6. "Black Widow" (Amir Derakh, Alford, Thorr, Shortino, W. Dio) - 4:33
7. "You Keep Breaking My Heart" (Derakh, Hager, Thorr, Alford, Shortino) - 5:13
8. "Kids Will Rock" (Thorr, Shortino) - 4:02
9. "Dressed to Kill" (Hager, Alford, Shortino) - 4:16
10. "She's Too Hott" (Hager, Alford, Shortino) - 3:27

== Chart positions ==
Chart (1985)	Peak position
US (Bubbling Under the Top LPs)	210

== Personnel ==
Production and performance credits are adapted from the album liner notes.

Band members

- Paul Shortino – lead vocals
- Amir Derakh – guitars
- Chris Hager – guitars
- Matt Thorr – bass
- Dave Alford – drums, vocals

Additional personnel

- Chorus on "Kids Will Rock" sung by The Road Runner Junior Soccer Team

Production

- Tom Allom – producer
- Mark Dodson – engineer
- Paul Wertheimer – second engineer
- Kevin Aguilar – front cover illustration
- Steve Gerdes – art direction, design
- Rough Cutt – original concept
- Wendy Dio – management for Niji Productions, Inc.
- David Adkins – management Integrity Music Management
