= Vertex (band) =

American rock group

- Genres: Industrial rock
- Years active: 1995–1996
- Label: Blue Dolphin Records
- Past members: Stephen Pearcy; Al Pitrelli; Hiro Kuretani

Vertex was a band formed in 1995 featuring singer Stephen Pearcy (Ratt, Arcade, Vicious Delite, Nitronic), guitarist Al Pitrelli (Danger Danger, Hotshot, Alice Cooper, Asia, Savatage, Megadeth, Trans-Siberian Orchestra), and drummer Hiro Kuretani (WXXI, Trancentral Station).

They released a self-titled album in 1996 as well as a single for the track "One Like a Son" that included two remixes by Eric Caudieux and Stan Katayama. A video for this single was also released. All bass parts were played by Pitrelli, who also recorded keyboards. Bob Daisley played bass on tracks "Time and Time" and "Ain't Gonna Be". The album is a concept album with a single narrator, chain of events and re-occurring characters.

Kuretani, who had met Stephen Pearcy at a gig where he opened for Stephen's band Arcade. Bassist Robbie Crane was a touring bassist for Vertex, but was not on the band's album. The band's music is categorized as industrial rock.

Stephen Pearcy currently has rejoined Ratt and Robbie Crane with Black Star Riders. Hiro Kuretani went on to become an electronic music (progressive breaks) producer.

== Past members ==
- Stephen Pearcy - Lead vocals
- Al Pitrelli - Guitars, bass guitar, keyboards
- Hiro Kuretani - Drums, programming, keyboards, synthesizers, computer, piano
- Robbie Crane - Bass guitar (touring only)

== Discography ==
=== Albums ===
- Vertex (1996)

=== Singles ===
- "One Like a Son"
