= Loud and Clear =

Loud and clear may refer to:

== Common use ==
- "Loud and clear", procedure words used in plain language radio checks

== Music ==
=== Albums ===
- Loud & Clear, the UK title of the 1978 Sammy Hagar album All Night Long
- Loud and Clear (Buster Brown album), 1985
- Loud and Clear (Autograph album), 1987

=== Songs ===
- "Loud and Clear", a song by The Cranberries from their album Bury the Hatchet, 1999
- Loud and Clear (The O.C. Supertones album), 2000
- "Loud and Clear", a song by The Sleeping from their album Questions & Answers, 2006
- "Loud & Clear", a song by Olly Murs from his album Right Place Right Time, 2012

== Other uses ==
- Loud and Clear, a 2004 book by Anna Quindlen

== See also ==
- "Talking Loud and Clear", a 1984 song by the English electronic band Orchestral Manoeuvres in the Dark
