= Wants You! =

- Cover art by Holly Hollington

Studio album by Rough Cutt
- Released: 1986
- Recorded: Crystal Studios, One On One Studios and Fiddler's, Los Angeles, California
- Genres: Heavy metal, glam metal
- Length: 37:03
- Label: Warner Bros.
- Producer: Jack Douglas

Rough Cutt chronology
Rough Cutt (1985)	Wants You! (1986)	Rough Cutt Live (1996)

Singles from Wants You!
- 1. "Double Trouble" Released: 1986; 2. "Take a Chance" Released: 1986

Professional ratings
Review scores
Source	Rating
AllMusic	3/5 stars
Collector's Guide to Heavy Metal	6/10
Kerrang!	3/5 stars

Wants You! is the second album by the American rock band Rough Cutt, released in 1986 by Warner Bros. Records. On certain versions/portions of the album, the full title appears as Rough Cutt Wants You!, as opposed to simply Wants You!

Producer Jack Douglas also worked with Cheap Trick, Aerosmith on Rocks, Toys in the Attic and Draw the Line, and on John Lennon's last record, Double Fantasy.

== Track listing ==
Side one

1. "Rock the USA" (Chris Hager, Matt Thorr, Paul Shortino, Dave Alford) - 2:58
2. "Bad Reputation" (Amir Derakh, Thorr, Alford) - 3:43
3. "Don't Settle for Less" (Hager, Shortino, Thorr, Alford) - 2:33
4. "Hot 'n' Heavy" (Hager, Derakh, Shortino, Thorr, Alford) - 4:46
5. "Take a Chance" (Hager, Derakh, Shortino, Thorr, Alford) - 4:04

Side two

1. "We Like It Loud" (Hager, Derakh, Shortino, Thorr, Alford) - 3:58
2. "Double Trouble" (Hager, Derakh, Shortino, Thorr, Alford) - 3:44
3. "You Wanna Be a Star" (Hager, Derakh, Shortino, Thorr, Alford) - 2:44
4. "Let 'em Talk" (Hager, Shortino, Thorr) - 3:35
5. "The Night Cries Out (for You)" (Hager, Derakh, Shortino, Thorr, Alford) - 4:52

== Personnel ==
Band members

- Paul Shortino – lead vocals
- Amir Derakh – guitars, synthesizers
- Chris Hager – guitars
- Matt Thorr – bass
- Dave Alford – drums, backing vocals

Production

- Jack Douglas – producer
- Jay Messina – engineer, mixing at The Record Plant, New York City
- Karat Faye, Jeff Bennett, Peter Arata – assistant engineers
- George Marino – mastering at Sterling Sound, New York City
