= Social Intercourse =

Social Intercourse may refer:

- Social Intercourse (Smashed Gladys album)
- Social Intercourse (Stephen Pearcy album)
