= Turn Up the Radio (Autograph song) =

- Promotional single sleeve

Single by Autograph

from the album Sign In Please
- B-side: "Thrill of Love"
- Released: December 22, 1984
- Studio: Record Plant (Los Angeles)
- Genre: Glam metal
- Length: 4:38
- Label: RCA
- Songwriters: Steve Plunkett; Steve Isham; Randy Rand; Steve Lynch; Keni Richards
- Producer: Neil Kernon

Autograph singles chronology
| "Turn Up the Radio" (1984) | "Send Her to Me" (1985) |

Music video
- "Turn Up the Radio" on YouTube

"Turn Up the Radio" is a song by American glam metal band Autograph. Released as the lead single from the band's 1984 debut album, Sign In Please, the song peaked at number 29 on the US Billboard Hot 100 on March 16, 1985, and number 17 on the Mainstream Rock Tracks on January 26, 1985. The song's accompanying music video also received a significant amount of airplay on MTV, ultimately boosting sales and popularity.

Due to the song being the band's only mainstream success and hit, Autograph is regarded as a one-hit wonder. The unexpected success of the single achieved the album certified gold status by the RIAA on April 1, 1985.

In 2015, "Sleazegrinder" of Louder included the song in his list of "The 20 Greatest Hair Metal Anthems Of All Time".

== Background ==
During pre-production for their RCA debut album Sign in Please, Autograph recorded a demo titled "Turn Up the Tape Machine," which later served as the foundation for the song "Turn Up the Radio".

Lead guitarist Steve Lynch described "Turn Up the Radio" as "a last minute song that RCA didn't even want on the album because they thought it had no commercial value." However, the band firmly insisted and were granted its inclusion. According to Lynch, Autograph didn't expect great commercial success for the song or the band in general because of their disillusionment with the music industry. Lynch also reflected that, although the song was never a personal favorite, he always appreciated its strong hook, commercial appeal, and "lyrics that were right for the times."

A demo version of the song appears on the band's "odds and ends" collection entitled Missing Pieces (and its reissue More Missing Pieces) wherein it has a slightly different chorus.

Chorus of the Demo Version:

Turn up the radio
I need the music, gimme some more
Turn up the tape machine
I wanna feel it and you know what I mean

The demo version, along with the song's "alternate electric" and "acoustic" versions, also appears on the band's The Anthology album which is a merge of the three albums Missing Pieces, More Missing Pieces, and Buzz.

== Music video ==
The song's music video gained significant airplay in the early days of MTV. Set in a 1980s technological future, the video opens with the band walking into a theater hall through an automated door. A RoboCop-like cyborg figure acting as a receptionist greets the band with the words "sign in please", which acts as a direct reference to the album on which the song appears. In a blatant instance of product placement, a ray of light reveals a PaperMate Sharpwriter mechanical pencil, which had been released earlier that year. Using the pencil, the band members provide their signatures next to their names (listed along with their respective musical instruments) on a paper during which the pencil's name is prominently featured. Drummer Keni Richards first writes an X, which sets off an error alarm; he then erases the X, provides a proper signature (not shown), and sticks the pencil in his hair. As the cyborg illuminates the stage lights and reflects them with its metal plating, the band is then seen performing the song to a crowd. In the final chorus, Autograph boards a limousine resembling a DMC DeLorean by its gull-wing doors wherein lead vocalist Steve Plunkett throws the pencil to one of the female fans before leaving. As all the band members are aboard, the limousine's doors are closed by the cyborg, which then proceeds to drive them out of the venue. The video ends with a shot of the cyborg's head.

The product placement was the band's manager's idea: she thought that the band's name and the album title Sign In Please presented a natural opportunity for a promotional deal with a pen-and-pencil company. In exchange for the prominent appearance of the pencil, the company helped fund the video — which was the band's first, and "a much more expensive video than the average new band" according to Plunkett — and also provided other financial support.

As of December 2024, the music video currently has over 28 million views on YouTube.

== Personnel ==
=== Autograph ===
- Steve Plunkett - lead vocals, rhythm guitar
- Steve Lynch - lead guitar
- Steve Isham - keyboards
- Randy Rand - bass
- Keni Richards - drums

== Reception and legacy ==
The song was ranked No. 93 on VH1's Top 100 Hard Rock Songs and was named an AMG Track Pick by Allmusic. In 1985, Guitar Player magazine awarded Steve Lynch "Guitar Solo of the Year" for his work on "Turn Up the Radio." The song's video was placed on New York Times list of the 15 Essential Hair-Metal Videos.

The song is featured in the 1984 Miami Vice episode "Little Prince".

The song is featured in the soundtrack of the 2002 video game Grand Theft Auto: Vice City on the game's fictional VRock radio station.

The song plays during the fight with Konstantin Brayko in 2010 video game Alpha Protocol.

The song is included in the soundtrack of 2021 video game Marvel's Guardians of the Galaxy.

The song was featured in the opening credits of the movie Hot Tub Time Machine which has become a cult classic and consequently gave the song a second life.

== Charts ==
| Chart (1984–1985) | Peak position |
|---|---|
| Canada Top Singles (RPM) | 53 |
| US Billboard Hot 100 | 29 |
| US Mainstream Rock (Billboard) | 17 |
