= Arcade (band) =

American glam metal band

Background information
- Origin: California, U.S.
- Genres: Glam metal, hard rock
- Years active: 1991–1994
- Labels: Epic
- Past members: Stephen Pearcy; Frankie Wilsey; Donny Syracuse; Fred Coury; Christopher Hager; Kelly Tremmel; Garry Nutt; Michael Andrews

Arcade was an American glam metal supergroup formed in 1992 by ex-Ratt vocalist Stephen Pearcy, Cinderella drummer Fred Coury, among others. The band featured ex-Sea Hags guitarist Frankie Wilsey, ex-Gypsy Rose guitarist Donny Syracuse, and ex-9.0 bassist Michael Andrews. Its original proposed name was to be Taboo.

Arcade released two studio albums. Their first self-titled album was released in June 1993 and contained 12 songs. Notably, the cover art for Arcade featured the face of pornographic actor Mimi Miyagi. "Nothin' to Lose," "Cry No More," and "Messed Up World" were singles. The album sold over 100,000 copies in the US.

Arcade went on tour with Bon Jovi in 1993 and also played at the Milwaukee Metal Fest that year.

Arcade's second album was recorded and released in 1994 and was produced by Attie Bauw. A/2 featured a much heavier sound, and contained a song called "Kidnapped," a song written for Polly Klaas, a girl who had been kidnapped and killed in 1993. The singles were "Angry" and "So What." The album sold over 20,000 copies in the US. Frankie Wilsey was replaced by Tony Marcus (ex-My Hero). Epic Records then dropped the band. Ray Luzier replaced Fred Coury in 1994.

Arcade's third release, A/3: Live and Unreleased (2000), contained many of the songs from their first album, either in demo form or live form.

The band ended in 1994, and Pearcy went on to VD (which included Michael Andrews and Tony Marcus), then Vertex.

Stephen Pearcy had announced that the band was to reunite, release a CD and DVD and tour in late 2006. This never came to be, as he rejoined Ratt.

== Discography ==
- Arcade (1993)
- A/2 (1994)
- A/3: Live and Unreleased (2000) Top Fuel Records
- A/4: Calm Before the Storm (2006/2008) Top Fuel Records
- Angry (2011) Top Fuel Records
