= Loud and Clear (Autograph album) =

Studio album by Autograph
- Released: March 1987
- Recorded: 1986–1987
- Genres: Hard rock; glam metal
- Length: 42:28
- Label: RCA
- Producer: Andy Johns

Autograph chronology
That's the Stuff (1985)	Loud and Clear (1987)	Missing Pieces (1997)

Singles from Loud and Clear
- 1. "She Never Looked That Good for Me" / "Dance All Night" Released: 1987; 2. "Loud and Clear" Released: 1987

Professional ratings
Review scores
Source	Rating
AllMusic	2.5/5 stars

Loud and Clear is the third studio album by American rock band Autograph, released in 1987. It would be the final album to feature original material by all five original members. The band would not issue another release until 1997. Two of the tracks featured on this album, "Dance all Night" and "She Never Looked that Good For Me" appeared (alongside with the band members themselves) in the 1987 fantasy-comedy film Like Father Like Son, released the same year. The original album issue, by RCA Records is out of print. The album was reissued on CD in 2006 by Rock Candy Records.

Loud and Clear ultimately proved unsuccessful, with the album (or any other releases) not proving to be as commercially successful as their 1984 debut. The album failed in sales and subsequently the band went on a long hiatus.

The title track "Loud and Clear" has a music video with Ozzy Osbourne and Vince Neil as extras.

== Track listing ==
No.	Title	Length
1.	"Loud and Clear"	3:41
2.	"Dance All Night"	4:30
3.	"She Never Looked That Good for Me"	3:36
4.	"Bad Boy"	4:09
5.	"Everytime I Dream"	4:53
6.	"She's a Tease"	3:38
7.	"Just Got Back from Heaven"	4:22
8.	"Down N' Dirty"	3:18
9.	"More Than a Million Times"	6:01
10.	"When the Sun Goes Down"	4:15

== Personnel ==
=== Autograph ===
- Steve Plunkett – vocals, rhythm guitar
- Steve Lynch – guitar, backing vocals
- Randy Rand – bass, backing vocals
- Steven Isham – keyboards, backing vocals
- Keni Richards – drums

== Charts ==
Chart (1987)	Peak position
US Billboard 200	108
