= View to a Thrill =

2018 album by Stephen Pearcy

Studio album by Stephen Pearcy
- Released: November 9, 2018
- Label: Frontiers Music

Stephen Pearcy chronology
Smash (2017)	View to a Thrill (2018)	Legacy (TBA)

View to a Thrill is the seventh solo studio album by Ratt frontman Stephen Pearcy. The album was released through Frontiers Music on November 9, 2018. The album was promoted by the release of the single "U Only Live Twice" on October 9, 2018.

== Reception ==
Dave Maturo of Medium noted the running theme of James Bond references throughout the album, writing "Let’s just say if you play drinking games and you took a swig every time Pearcy references James Bond in some way, you’d have alcohol poisoning by the end of side 1." Maturo praised the album for its sound inspired by Pearcy's band Ratt, and added he was "a little surprised" that it wasn't released as a Ratt album.

In his review, Olivier of SleazeRoxx noted the lack of promotion for View to a Thrill when compared to Pearcy's previous solo album Smash. Pearcy himself commented on the lack of promotion in a 2019 interview for the site, saying "it had a lot more to do with the label [Frontiers Music Srl] seemingly drop the ball [sic] and I’m not one to sit around and wonder why, who, what, where." Olivier concluded his review by saying that despite his initial hesitations with the album, "it's a better than average album and shows that Pearcy still has a lot left in the tank."

Vito Tanzi of Cryptic Rock gave the album 3 out of 5 stars in his review, concluding with "There is no telling if we will get new music from Ratt anytime soon, however, on View to a Thrill, Pearcy sticks with what works – the signature sound which made Ratt a household name. Ultimately, for fans who can’t get enough of Glam Metal [sic] nostalgia, Stephen Pearcy’s View to a Thrill furnishes a decent offering of music where every song incorporates enough Rock [sic] tenacity to satisfy anyone who presses play."

== Track listing ==
Track listing from iTunes:

All tracks are written by Erik Ferentinos, Stephen Pearcy.

No.	Title	Length
1.	"U Only Live Twice"	2:56
2.	"Sky Falling"	3:39
3.	"Malibu"	3:04
4.	"One in a Million"	2:36
5.	"Double Shot"	3:08
6.	"Secrets to Tell"	3:22
7.	"Not Killin' Me"	3:36
8.	"Dangerous Thing"	3:23
9.	"I'm a Ratt"	3:23
10.	"From the Inside"	3:23
11.	"Violator"	2:49

== Personnel ==
- Stephen Pearcy – lead vocals
- Erik Ferentinos – lead and rhythm guitar, keyboards, backing vocals
- Matt Thorne – bass, keyboards, backing vocals
- Scot Coogan – drums
