= Buzz (Autograph album) =

Studio album by Autograph
- Released: 2003
- Genres: Hard rock, glam metal
- Length: 44:37
- Label: Point Music Distribution
- Producer: Steve Plunkett

Autograph chronology
Missing Pieces (1997)	Buzz (2003)	More Missing Pieces (2003)

Buzz is the fifth studio album by American rock band Autograph. Apart from original lead singer and songwriter Steve Plunkett, the band had a completely new lineup of members. The original lineup of members recorded and released three studio albums from 1984–1987, before disbanding in 1989 with Loud and Clear being the last release. The Buzz lineup did the same in 2005.

== Track listing ==
All tracks are written by Steve Plunkett.

No.	Title	Length
1.	"Break a Sweat"	4:10
2.	"Shake the Tree"	4:26
3.	"She's the Reason"	4:27
4.	"Fed Up with Bein' Down"	4:20
5.	"That"	5:05
6.	"Party Like We Did"	4:05
7.	"Buzz"	4:45
8.	"Like It Hot"	4:01
9.	"Heart Raper"	5:02
10.	"Can't Stop Rockin'"	4:16

== Personnel ==
- Steve Plunkett – lead vocals, rhythm guitar, keyboards
- T.J. Helmerich – lead guitar
- Lance Morrison – bass
- Matt Laug – drums

Additional personnel

- Bart Walsh – lead guitar (tracks 3 and 9)

Production

- Produced by Steve Plunkett
- Mastered by Lou Hemsey
