= Matt Thorr =

American bassist

Matt Thorne
- Genres: Glam metal, heavy metal
- Occupation: Musician
- Instrument: Bass guitar
- Member of: Stephen Pearcy
- Formerly of: Jailhouse, Ratt, Rough Cutt

Matt Thorne, also known as Matt Thorr, is an American bassist who has played in the glam metal bands Ratt, Rough Cutt, and Jailhouse. He co-wrote the song "Back for More" with Stephen Pearcy on Ratt's album Out of the Cellar (1984). He owns MT Studios for BlueThumbProductions in Burbank, California, where he has produced, engineered and mixed albums for artists such as The Eels, Trapt, and 8th Day.

== Discography ==
=== With Ratt ===
- Metal Massacre Vol. 1 (Ratt "Tell the World"), not included on CD reissue (1982)
- The Garage Tape Dayz 78-81 (2000)
- Rattus Erectus 1976-1982 (2004)
- In Your Direction (2004)

=== With Rough Cutt ===
- Rough Cutt (1985)
- Wants You! (1986)
- Rough Cutt Live (1996)
- Anthology (2008)
- Rough Cutt 3 (2021)

=== With Jailhouse ===
- Alive in a Mad World (1989)
- Jailhouse (1998)
- Straight at the Light (2010)
- Please Come Back (2012)

=== With Tuff ===
- History of Tuff (2001) *Producer

=== With Platinum Overdose ===
- Murder in High Heels (2019)
- Back for the Thrill (2020)

=== With Stephen Pearcy ===
- Smash (2017)
- View to a Thrill (2018)
