= Super Rock '85 in Japan =

Overnight rock festival held on 10-11 August 1985 at Odaiba Kouen Hiroba, Tokyo, Japan

Super Rock '85 in Japan was an overnight rock festival held on 10–11 August 1985 at Odaiba Kouen Hiroba in Tokyo, Japan. It was a sequel to Super Rock '84 in Japan. The show was headlined by Dio. Other performers included Foreigner, Sting, Mama's Boys, Rough Cutt and Earthshaker.
