= Paul Shortino =

American rock singer and musician

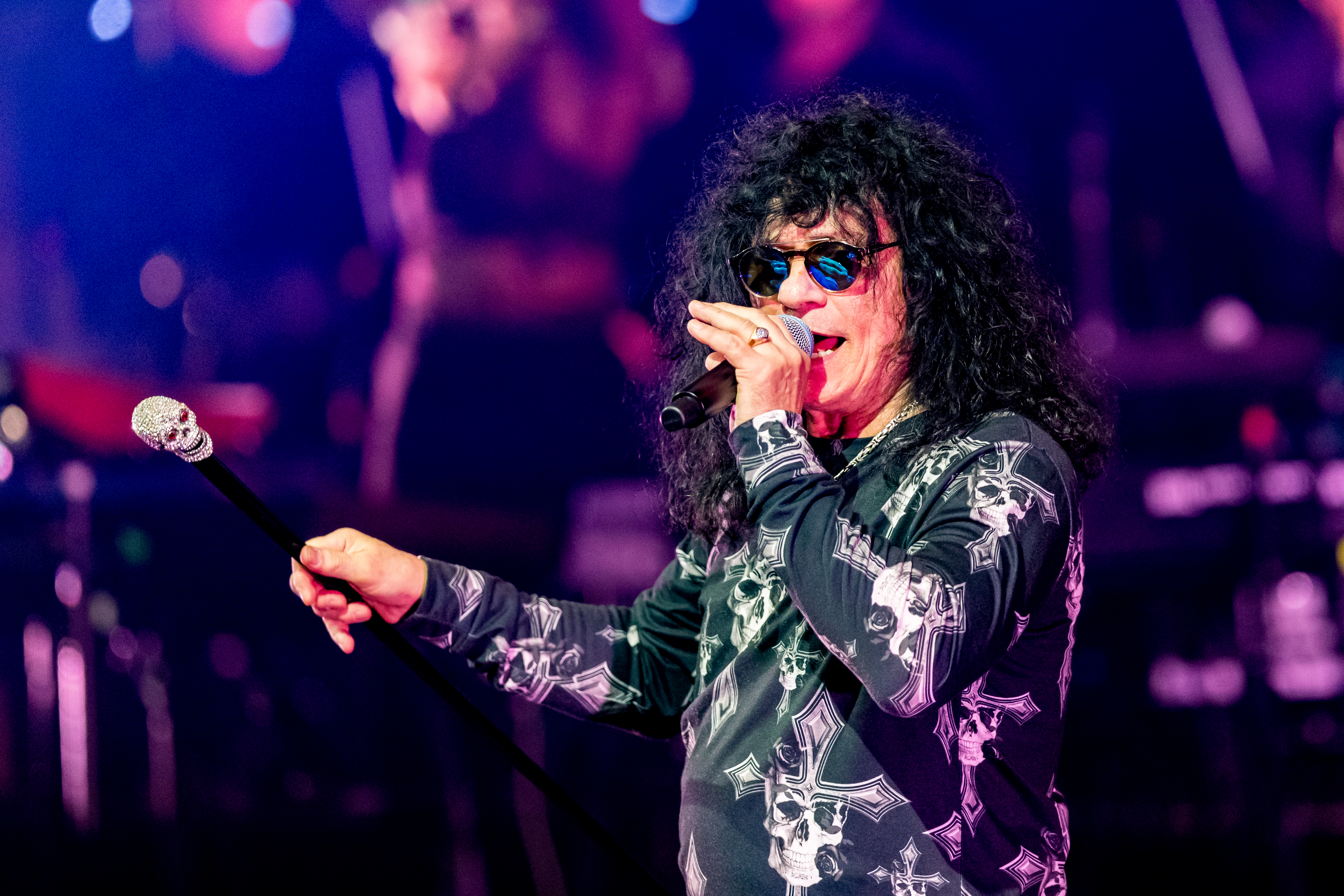
- Shortino performing at Rock Meets Classic in 2024

Background information
- Born: May 14, 1953 (age 73)
- Genres: Heavy metal, glam metal
- Instruments: Vocals, guitar, keyboards, bass, percussion

Paul Shortino (born May 14, 1953) is an American rock singer and musician who has sung for Rough Cutt/The Cutt, Quiet Riot, Bad Boyz, and Shortino. He briefly recorded with J.K. Northrup as the duo, Shortino/Northrup. He has also recorded as a solo artist, writing and performing the song "E.G.G.M.A.N." as the theme for Dr. Eggman in Sonic Adventure 2 for Sega, and in Shadow the Hedgehog as "E.G.G.M.A.N. Doc Robeatnix Mix". Shortino recorded lead vocals for the Heavy Metal benefit project Hear 'n Aid in 1985. The single from this project, "Stars", also features lead vocals by heavy metal singers Ronnie James Dio, Rob Halford, Geoff Tate, Don Dokken, Kevin DuBrow, Eric Bloom and Dave Meniketti.

Shortino is currently a member of the band King Kobra, and also performs in the cast of Raiding the Rock Vault at the Hard Rock Hotel and Casino in Las Vegas.

== Acting ==
Shortino played the character "Duke Fame" in the film, This Is Spinal Tap, and reprised this role in the first webisode by Las Vegas-based group Sin City Sinners. In 2014, Shortino was featured on the season 3 episode of Counting Cars titled Heavy Metal. He resides in Las Vegas with his wife Carmen, and is a regular guest of the Sinners.

== Discography ==
=== With Rough Cutt ===
- "Used And Abused" and "A Little Kindness" (1981)
- Rough Cutt (1985)
- Wants You! (1986)
- Rough Cutt Live (1996)
- Sneak Peek EP (2000)
- Anthology (2008)
- Rough Cutt 3 (2021)

=== With The Cutt ===
- Sacred Place (2002)

=== With Quiet Riot ===
- QR (1988)

=== With Badd Boyz ===
- Badd Boyz (1993)
- No, No, Nikkie (2021)

=== With Shortino ===
- It's About Time (1997)
- Booked, Toured, ...Released! (1999)
- Chasing My Dream (2009)
- Make A Wish (2020)

=== With Shortino/Northrup ===
- Back on Track (1993)
- Afterlife (2004)

=== Paul Shortino & the Rhythm Junkies ===
- Stand or Fall (1999)

=== Hear 'n Aid ===
- Hear 'n Aid - "Stars" (1986)

=== With King Kobra ===
- King Kobra (2011)
- King Kobra II (2013)
- We Are Warriors (2023)

=== With Michael Cosyn Group ===
- Burn The Earth (2015)

=== With Appice ===
- Sinister (2017)
