= Super Rock '84 in Japan =

Super Rock '84 in Japan was a touring rock festival held in Japan from 4 to 12 August 1984 in Nagoya, Fukuoka, Osaka and Tokorozawa. The lineup included Bon Jovi, Whitesnake, Scorpions, Michael Schenker Group and Anvil. A sequel, Super Rock '85 in Japan, occurred 10 August 1985 in Tokyo, Japan.

== See also ==
- 1984 in Japanese music
