= Arcade (Arcade album) =

Studio album by Arcade
- Released: 1993
- Genre: Hard rock
- Label: Epic
- Producer: David Prater

Arcade chronology
Arcade (1993)	A/2 (1994)

Arcade is the debut studio album by American rock supergroup Arcade. Released in 1993, the album produced two singles that would land in the Top 30 of the Billboard Mainstream Rock Chart: "Nothin' to Lose" and "Cry No More". The album would prove to be a mild success as it charted No. 133 on the Billboard 200 and No. 5 on the Billboard Heatseekers chart. "Calm Before the Storm" is about Nikki Sixx.

== Critical reception ==
Professional ratings
Review scores
Source	Rating
AllMusic	4/5 stars
Calgary Herald	D

The Calgary Herald considered Arcade "yet another band that sticks to those hard rock cliches like wet clothes stick to a wet body."

== Track listing ==
No.	Title	Length
1.	"Dancin' with the Angels"	4:07
2.	"Nothin' to Lose"	4:36
3.	"Calm Before the Storm"	4:06
4.	"Cry No More"	5:32
5.	"Screamin' S.O.S."	3:35
6.	"Never Goin' Home"	3:40
7.	"Messed Up World"	3:54
8.	"All Shook Up"	3:37
9.	"So Good... So Bad..."	4:36
10.	"Livin' Dangerously"	3:11
11.	"Sons and Daughters"	1:53
12.	"Mother Blues"	3:12

=== Japanese Bonus Track ===
No.	Title	Length
13.	"Reckless"	3:25

== Personnel ==
- Stephen Pearcy – lead vocals
- Frankie Wilsex – guitar
- Donny Syracuse – guitar
- Michael Andrews – bass
- Fred Coury – drums

== Chart positions ==
Chart (1993)	Peak position
Japan (Oricon)	42
US Billboard 200	133
US Heatseekers Albums (Billboard)	5

Singles - Billboard (North America)

Year	Single	Chart	Position
1993	"Cry No More"	Mainstream Rock Tracks	27
1993	"Nothin' to Lose"	Mainstream Rock Tracks	29
