= Under My Skin (Stephen Pearcy album) =

Studio album by Stephen Pearcy
- Released: July 22, 2008
- Label: Top Fuel Records, Airline Records

Stephen Pearcy chronology
Stripped (2006)	Under My Skin (2008)	Suckerpunch (2011)

Under My Skin is the third solo album by Stephen Pearcy, the founder, lead singer and songwriter of the rock band Ratt. The album was released on July 22, 2008, by Top Fuel Records and Airline Records. Included on the album is the single "Round and Round" (featuring The Donnas) which is a remake of the 1984 Ratt hit "Round and Round". The track "Are You Ready", like previous recordings "Drive with Me" and the re-recorded Arcade track "Hott Racin'", was heard on NHRA/ESPN 2. A video was shot for "You're a Lot Like Me", and "In Outta Love" was chosen as a single.

It is rated three out of five stars on AllMusic.

== Track listing ==
1. "You're a Lot Like Me" – 2:38
2. "Big Nothin'" – 3:31
3. "Watcha Doin'" – 2:30
4. "Time Slips Away" – 3:05
5. "Under My Skin" – 3:26
6. "In Outta Love" – 3:12
7. "Here We Go Again" – 2:43
8. "Bottoms Up" – 2:29
9. "Are You Ready" – 3:08
10. "Injector" – 2:30
11. "Round and Round" (featuring The Donnas) – 4:30
