= Missing Pieces (Autograph album) =

Studio album by Autograph
- Released: 1997
- Recorded: 1984, 1986–1989
- Genres: Hard rock, glam metal
- Length: 46:09

Autograph chronology
Loud and Clear (1987)	Missing Pieces (1997)	Buzz (2003)

Professional ratings
Review scores
Source	Rating
AllMusic	3/5 stars

Missing Pieces is the fourth studio album by American rock band Autograph. It was released initially in 1997 on Pavement Music, then re-released in both 2002 and 2004 on Crash Music. A majority of the material was recorded for an album intended for a 1989 release, but the project was abandoned and the group disbanded.

A reissue of the album, titled "More Missing Pieces", was released in 2003.

== Track listing ==
No.	Title	Length
1.	"All Night Long"	3:57
2.	"Heartattack" (Demo Version)	4:02
3.	"When I'm Gone"	4:20
4.	"I've Got You" (Demo Version)	4:29
5.	"One Way Dead End Street" (Demo Version)	3:51
6.	"Sanctuary"	4:34
7.	"Sweet Temptation"	3:46
8.	"Love Comes Easy"	3:45
9.	"Angel in Black" (Raw Demo Version)	3:50
10.	"Turn Up the Radio" (Raw Demo Version)	4:39
11.	"Angela" (Demo Version)	4:51
12.	"Reason to Rock" (Bonus Track for Japan)	4:49
13.	"Nothin' to Lose" (Bonus Track for Japan)	3:49
