= Vicious Delite =

Metal band featuring Ratt's Stephen Pearcy

- Genres: Alternative metal
- Years active: 1995
- Label: Triple X
- Spinoff of: Arcade
- Past members: Stephen Pearcy; Tony Marcus; Michael Andrews; Rob Karras; Mike Duda

Vicious Delite was an alternative metal band formed by Stephen Pearcy in 1995 after Arcade disbanded. Completing the line-up were Tony Marcus, Michael Andrews (both formerly from Arcade) and Rob Karras. Mike Duda (of W.A.S.P.) later replaced Andrews on bass guitar. Rob Karras, also formerly of the Bulletboys, died in 2012.

They released a limited self-titled EP, followed by a full-length album in 1995. The band disbanded after Pearcy reunited with Ratt the following year.

== Discography ==
- Vicious Delite EP (1995)
- Vicious Delite (1995, reissued in 2000)
