= Social Intercourse (Stephen Pearcy album) =

Studio album by Stephen Pearcy
- Released: July 23, 2002

Stephen Pearcy chronology
Social Intercourse (2002)	Fueler (2005)

Social Intercourse is a solo album by Ratt singer Stephen Pearcy.

It is rated 3.5 out of 5 stars on AllMusic.

== Track list ==
1. I Gotta Be Me
2. Can't Ever Get Enough
3. Freak
4. In Like Pink
5. Ya Gotta Love That
6. In The Corner
7. Turn It Upside Down
8. Live To Die
9. Ya Talkin' To Me
10. Five Fingers
11. Rock Kandy
