= Steve Lynch =

American guitarist (born 1955)

- Born: January 18, 1955 (age 71); Williston, North Dakota, U.S.
- Origin: Seattle, Washington, U.S.
- Genres: Hard rock; glam metal; heavy metal
- Occupation: Musician
- Instrument: Guitar
- Years active: 1970–present
- Formerly of: Autograph; Network 23

Steve Lynch (born January 18, 1955) is an American guitarist. He is best known as the co-founder and lead guitarist of the glam metal/hard rock band Autograph, which formed in 1983. He decided to commit himself to music and mastering guitar when Jimi Hendrix died in 1970. In addition to Hendrix, Lynch's influences came from late-1960s and early-1970s rock musicians such as Led Zeppelin, Pink Floyd and the Beatles. He initially played bass; however Hendrix's death in 1970 influenced him to switch to guitar.

Lynch gradually developed his signature two-handed (eight-finger) tapping technique throughout the 1970s and into the mid-1980s to current day.

== Early life ==
Lynch was born on January 18, 1955 in Williston, North Dakota, but at the age of one, he moved with his family to Seattle, where he was primarily raised. He was one of six children.

== Career ==
Lynch toured the Pacific Northwest (Washington, Oregon, Northern California, Idaho, Montana, Utah, and British Columbia during the early to late 70s before attending the Guitar Institute of Technology in Los Angeles in 1978. Upon graduation in 1979 he won the prestigious 'Most Likely to Succeed' award. He also signed a publishing contract with Dale Zdenek Publications in 1979 for his instructional book on his two-handed tapping technique, titled The Right Touch.

Lynch rose to stardom during the mid-1980s, when his then-current band, Autograph, (RCA Records) had a top-40 hit with "Turn Up the Radio", which peaked No. 29 on the US Billboard Hot 100. Lynch's work on the track helped earn him "Guitar Solo of the Year" honors from Guitar World Magazine. Featured on Autograph's debut album, Sign In Please, the song helped the album earn gold certification in America and Canada.

Autograph went on to record two more albums for RCA, That's the Stuff (1985) and Loud and Clear (1987). Lynch also won the New York Music Expo's Best New Guitarist award in 1985, which won him a seat on the speaking panel at Madison Square Gardens in New York City alongside Al DiMeola, Les Paul, Johnny Winter and Larry Coryell.

Lynch, with his band Autograph, toured in the 80s with Van Halen, Motley Crue, Aerosmith, Heart, Brian Adams, Ronnie James Dio among several others. They also filmed several videos for MTV and VH1. In addition, Lynch performed on American Bandstand and Solid Gold with Autograph, as well as wrote and recorded numerous songs for television, movies, and video games. He then wrote his second and third instructional books and recorded his instructional video ‘The Two-Handed Guitarist’ on REH Videos in 1987.

After recording and touring with Autograph through 1989, he taught his two-handed guitar technique touring 20 countries completing 325 clinics to promote his books The Right Touch volumes 1, 2 & 3 while promoting St. Louis Music simultaneously.

In 1994, he formed a solo project called Network 23 with Scott Gilman on vocals and sax, and Chris Frazier and Mike Mangini on drums. Lynch wrote, arranged, produced and played all the guitar, bass, keyboards and additional percussion parts. The recording was completed in 1995. Taking a more experimental approach with his writing and arranging, he considered the project to be more of a modern sound than the 80s genre and Autograph.

In 2006, Lynch founded 'The Federal Way School of Music' located south of Seattle, where he taught and ran the school until 2016.

While managing his school he also reformed Autograph with a new vocalist and drummer in 2013. The band released an album in 2015 which garnished two singles: 'Get Off Your Ass' and 'Every Generation'. After the release of the album and touring with the band for 6 years, Lynch began developing carpal tunnel syndrome and had to take a break from touring in August 2019. He also began to pursue a new musical direction, which he described as being influenced by international cultures and experiences. He's calling the new project Blue Neptune.

When the COVID pandemic began, Lynch decided to write his autobiography Confessions of a Rock Guitarist, which has been completed and is currently being prepared for release in May of 2025 with Indigo River Publishing. The book was officially released on May 20, 2025.

== Technique ==
Lynch is considered a highly skilled and innovative guitarist. His multi-fingered tapping technique, which he still teaches today, incorporates a complex approach to music theory and often requires the use of all four picking-hand fingers as well as those on the fretting hand. This approach means that Lynch's solos are highly challenging. Perhaps the most elaborate recorded example of the technique is the unaccompanied 1985 instrumental track "Hammerhead", from Autograph's second studio album That's the Stuff. In 1985, Lynch won the "Guitar Solo of the Year" award from Guitar World magazine for his solo on "Turn Up The Radio", Autograph's biggest hit.
