= Autograph (American band) =

American rock band

- Origin: Los Angeles, California, U.S.
- Genres: Glam metal; hard rock
- Years active: 1983–1989; 2002–2005; 2013–2023
- Labels: RCA; Pavement; POINT; Rhino; Frontiers Records
- Past members: Steve Plunkett; Steve Lynch; Randy Rand; Keni Richards; Steven Isham; Eddie Cross; Simon Daniels; Marc Wieland; Jimi Bell; T. J. Helmerich; Matt Laug; Lance Morrison; Steve Unger
- Website: autographband.net

Autograph was an American rock band formed in Los Angeles, California, in 1983. The band is best known for their 1984 hit song "Turn Up the Radio".

== History ==
=== Formation and classic years (1983–1989) ===
The group of musicians began playing and recording together, soon taking the form of an actual band. Together, they chose the name "Autograph" while driving from Los Angeles to Jacksonville, Florida, to open for Van Halen in January of 1984. They recorded their first rough demos in late 1983, but played them only for a few close friends. One of them was Andy Johns, a famous record producer who Steve Plunkett had met while helping singer Joe Cerisano produce Silver Condor's second album Trouble At Home. Johns invited the band to re-record and upgrade the demos at the Record Plant Studios for free under his guidance. Keni Richards then played the demo for David Lee Roth, who subsequently invited the band to open for Van Halen on their 1984 tour. The band rose to prominence opening for Van Halen, ultimately playing 48 shows, an act of distinction for an unsigned band. Due to their rising popularity, Autograph soon signed a contract with RCA Records, following a performance at Madison Square Garden in New York City in late 1984. On December 28 1984, the band opened for Christian metal act Stryper at the Santa Monica Civic Auditorium, shortly before "Turn Up the Radio" began its chart ascent.

Autograph's debut album, Sign In Please, was completed and released in October, but did not make an appearance on any record charts until January 1985. The album contains the band's only major hit, and now signature song, "Turn Up the Radio." The song itself was one of the last ones recorded for the album, and the band members were initially very lukewarm toward it. However, the tune would become a top-30 hit, pushing album sales past the gold album mark (500,000 copies sold). The song was featured in an episode of Miami Vice (entitled "Little Prince") and was also leased out to numerous other films, even further elevating the song's popularity. Lynch's guitar work in "Turn Up The Radio", featuring a distinctive two-handed, fretboard-tapping technique, won him the "Guitar Solo of the Year" award from Guitar Player magazine in 1985.

"Send Her to Me" was released as a follow-up single, though its success paled in comparison to the massive first hit. Other songs from the Sign in Please album, "My Girlfriend's Boyfriend Isn't Me" and "Deep End", along with "Take No Prisoners", which would soon appear on the band's follow-up album, were featured in the 1985 film Secret Admirer, starring C. Thomas Howell, Kelly Preston, Corey Haim, Lori Loughlin and Casey Siemaszko. The 1985 films Fright Night and A Nightmare on Elm Street 2: Freddy's Revenge also included a song the band recorded titled "You Can't Hide From the Beast Inside".

A second album, That's the Stuff, was quickly recorded and released in the fall of 1985, and the group went on tour in support of several other bands, including Mötley Crüe and Heart. Although record sales were disappointing in comparison to their first album, it still achieved near gold status. Supported by the singles "Blondes in Black Cars" (which became a minor hit) and the title track, That's the Stuff eventually peaked at No. 92 on the Billboard albums chart. The band then recorded a song titled "Winning Is Everything" for the film Youngblood.

Autograph recorded a third album, which took longer to record than the other two combined and Loud and Clear was released in the spring of 1987. The title song's music video featured Ozzy Osbourne and Vince Neil of Mötley Crüe as extras. The band also made three appearances on Headbangers Ball in support of the album. In October, the band made a cameo in the film Like Father, Like Son, starring Dudley Moore and Kirk Cameron. The first song featured was "Dance all Night", which played briefly, and then they performed the song "She Never Looked That Good for Me" for the film, appearing in a brief cameo as themselves. Despite all three of these songs being released as singles, the album was not a big success.

=== Leaving RCA and break up (1988–1989) ===
The band left RCA Records in early 1988. Isham left the band to pursue other options but was not replaced, as the band felt they no longer needed keyboards, and wanted to take a newer and heavier direction. The remaining members began recording a new album in 1988 which they hoped to release sometime the following year, but those plans ultimately failed to materialize.

Richards also left the band around this time. However, in early 1989 the band toured with new drummer Eddie Cross and continued to sporadically record. The band would eventually be offered a new deal with Epic in 1989, which they declined.

In their short time they recorded three albums and toured with several famous bands, including Kiss, Mötley Crüe, Heart, Aerosmith, Ronnie James Dio, Van Halen, Bryan Adams, and Whitesnake, but in the end could not sustain their own career. Disappointed, the remaining members disbanded in December 1989.During the time from 1983–1989, Autograph had songs in several major motion pictures, including- Secret Admirer, River Ratt, Youngblood, Like Father Like Son, The Amy Fisher Story, among others. More recently their song Turn Up The Radio was featured in Hot Tub Time Machine. They also had songs in tv series, including Miami Vice. More recently they’ve had their song “All I’m Gonna Take” in the video game Grand Theft Auto/Vice City, as well as Guardians of the Galaxy. They’ve been featured on numerous compilation albums and still receive radio play throughout the world.

=== Post break-up (1989–2013) ===
Though the group had disbanded, some of their music videos (most commonly "Turn Up the Radio") continued to be played on music channels and programs such as MTV's Headbangers Ball for several years after their initial debut.

Steve Plunkett – When the original group disbanded in 1989, Plunkett became a staff writer and producer for All Nations Music, where he had over 170 of his songs released, including over 40 in movies like Rock Star, "Brave New Girl" (Britney Spears penned movie for ABC Family) and Gods and Monsters. Many artists have recorded his songs including Vixen, The Go-Go's, and Marc Anthony and Edgar Winter. He has also produced artists such as Cyndi Lauper, Loretta Lynn, Graham Nash and En Vogue. He wrote and performed the theme song for the WB television series 7th Heaven, as well as several other theme songs for shows such as Summerland, Kojak, and Queen of Swords which featured "Behind the Mask" performed by Jose Feliciano. Plunkett has had his original songs in many TV shows, such as Beverly Hills 90210, Melrose Place, Sex and the City and The Simpsons. Plunkett also released a solo album in 1991, entitled, "My Attitude".

Steve Lynch – The original lead guitarist has been a guitar teacher for several years, schooling students in his virtuosic signature 8-finger "hammer-on" guitar technique. He has also published several books on his guitar styles as well as an instructional video that has been a top seller worldwide. He has conducted 325 'guitar clinics' in 20 countries. He eventually formed another band named Network 23 and the album by the same name was released in 2004. He also owned a music school in the Seattle area from 2004–2016 and completed a new teaching website called lynchlicks.com that went online in 2009. In 2013–2019 Steve reunited with Randy Rand and two replacement players to tour and do some additional recording. He temporarily left touring with Autograph in 2019. Then, when Covid hit in March of 2020, Lynch decided to write his autobiography ‘Confessions of a Rock Guitarist’, which is due for release late 2023 / early 2024. He now spends his time between Tampa, Florida and the New Jersey shore to spend with his soulmate Suzanne and their two dogs (Ryley Roo & Mason).

Randy Rand – The former bassist began a career in leather-making, establishing an international importing/exporting shop that sold his own hand-crafted leather products, and even working with Harley Davidson for a time. According to Autograph's now-defunct "Turn Up the Web!" website, he had a daughter named Sterling Knight who has become a relatively well-known model in Italy. Rand died in April 2022.

Keni Richards – The drummer went on to work with the band Dirty White Boy, but later took a hiatus from the music business due to a chronic back problem he has had for several years. Nevertheless, he continued his passion for music and art, publicly saying he has no regrets. He later returned to the music industry, involving himself in songwriting and producing duties even after the band broke up and continued it even after band's reformation, wherein he participated for a short period of time. Richards died on April 8, 2017, reportedly in a drug-related homicide.

Steven Isham – The keyboardist remained active in the music business through the following years until his death from liver cancer at the age of 56 on December 9, 2008. Some of Isham's well-known duties include forming a band named The Pack with Gary Moon (who later replaced Jack Blades in the band Night Ranger) and being Vince Neil's drummer and assistant musical director during the latter's solo tour in 1993.

Eddie Cross – The drummer of the Los Angeles band, Hot Wheelz, joined Autograph and played on its 1989 tour and the new tracks on the Missing Pieces CD. He was later a member of several other L.A. bands, including Bad Boys (with former members of Quiet Riot), Vigilante Man (with Guns N' Roses co-writer West Arkeen) and Gilby Clarke (who later joined Guns N' Roses). In 1991, Cross went to law school in Orange County, California, and has been President of Law Offices of Edward H. Cross & Associates, PC since 1995. The firm opened in Santa Ana, California, relocated to Kailua-Kona, Hawai'i in 2004 and finally landed in Palm Desert, California, in 2005, where he practices construction and real estate law. He has a daughter and a son and is a world traveler and an avid photographer.

=== Reunion (2013–present) ===
In late 2013, original members Steve Lynch, Randy Rand, and Keni Richards got back together for a reunion and began touring in 2014. Due to Plunkett not being interested in doing the reunion, they have replaced him with Brazilian American singer/songwriter/guitarist Simon Daniels, a member of Jailhouse, Agent X, Flood, 1RKO. The band has an interview in Guitar World Magazine, and reviews in Classic Rock and Fireworks magazines.

Since 2014, by which time Richards had been replaced by Mark Wieland on drums, the band has played the Monsters of Rock Cruise, M3 Rock Festival, The Moondance Jam, The Halfway Jam, Firefest UK, Rockin the Rivers, The Iowa State Fair along with other festivals, theaters and worldwide touring.

On January 15, 2015, they released their first single, "You Are Us, We Are You", on iTunes. On April 21, they released their 2nd single, "I Lost My Mind in America". In July, the band was featured in USA Today NEWS after playing the famous Halfway Jam Rock Festival. On September 23, the band released their 3rd single "Every Generation" and is featured as track of the week on Classic Rock Magazine.

On January 7, 2016, the new 5 song EP Louder, with 4 original new singles and a live version of "Turn up the Radio", was released and is available on the official website.

On January 10, 2017, the band completed the recordings for the new full album which will be announced and released this year In March, the band had already toured the Midwest and Northeast US again, with shows in the UK and Germany and is booked solid for the rest of the year.

On April 8, 2017, Keni Richards died at the age of 60. The cause of his death appears to be a drug-related homicide.

On July 29, 2017, the band signed with EMP Label Group owned by David Ellefson of Megadeth and have announced a new album titled Get Off Your Ass, which was released on October 6, with a limited-edition LP. The album received unfavorable reviews resulting in dismal sales and no royalties were paid.

On July 24, 2019, Steve Lynch decided to take a temporary break from touring and was replaced by Jimi Bell, who previously played in the House of Lords and Maxx Explosion.

On April 26, 2022, it was announced bassist Randy Rand, one of the original members, had died at the age of 69.

On August 16th, 2023, original lead guitarist Steve Lynch announced that he had won in his opposition in the trademark against Daniels, Wieland, and Bell, who intended on resuming touring following the death of original bassist Randy Rand without the licensing rights to the name, trademark and logo. The remaining members then renamed the band into Autograph Beyond, to avoid future trademark issues.

== Band members ==
=== Former ===
- Steve Lynch – lead guitar, backing vocals (1983–1989, 2013–2019)
- Steve Plunkett – lead vocals, rhythm guitar, keyboards (1983–1989, 2002–2005)
- Randy Rand – bass, backing vocals (1983–1989, 2013–2022; his death)
- Steven Isham – keyboards, backing vocals (1983–1988; died 2008)
- Keni Richards – drums (1983–1988, 2013–2014; died 2017)
- Eddie Cross – drums (1988–1989)
- T. J. Helmerich – lead guitar, backing vocals (2002–2005)
- Matt Laug – drums (2002–2005)
- Simon Daniels – lead vocals, rhythm guitar (2013–2023)
- Marc Wieland – drums (2014–2023)
- Jimi Bell – lead guitar, backing vocals (2019–2023)
- Steve Unger – bass, backing vocals (2022–2023)

=== Lineups and membership ===
Line-ups in eras
Years	Lineup	Albums/releases
1983–1988	Steve Plunkett – lead vocals, rhythm guitar; Steve Lynch – lead guitar; Steven Isham – keyboards, backing vocals; Keni Richards – drums, percussion; Randy Rand – bass, backing vocals	Sign In Please (1984); That's the Stuff (1985); Loud And Clear (1987)
1988–1989	Steve Plunkett – lead vocals, rhythm guitar; Steve Lynch – lead guitar; Eddie Cross – drums; Randy Rand – bass, backing vocals	None
2002–2005	Steve Plunkett – lead vocals, rhythm guitar, keyboards; T. J. Helmerich – lead guitar; Lance Morrison – bass; Matt Laug – drums	Buzz (2003)
2013–2014	Simon Daniels – lead vocals, rhythm guitar; Keni Richards – drums, percussion; Randy Rand – bass, backing vocals; Steve Lynch – lead guitar	None
2014–2019	Simon Daniels – lead vocals, rhythm guitar; Marc Wieland – drums, percussion; Randy Rand – bass, backing vocals; Steve Lynch – lead guitar	Louder (2016); Get Off Your Ass (2017)
2019–2022	Simon Daniels – lead vocals, rhythm guitar; Marc Wieland – drums, percussion; Randy Rand – bass, backing vocals; Jimi Bell – lead guitar	Beyond (2022)
2022–2023	Simon Daniels – lead vocals, rhythm guitar; Marc Wieland – drums, percussion; Steve Unger – bass, backing vocals; Jimi Bell – lead guitar	None

== Discography ==
=== Albums ===
Year	Album	US	RIAA certification	Label
1984	Sign In Please	29	Gold	RCA
1985	That's the Stuff	92	–	RCA
1987	Loud and Clear	108	–	RCA
1997	Missing Pieces	–	–	Pavement Records
2003	Buzz	–	–	POINT Music
2003	More Missing Pieces	–	–	POINT Music
2011	The Anthology	–	–	Cleopatra Records
2016	Louder	–	–	Autograph
2017	Get Off Your Ass	–	–	EMP Label Group
2022	Beyond	–	–	Frontiers Records
2025	Send Her To Me	–	–	FnA Records
2025	Cloud 10	–	–	FnA Records

=== Singles ===
Year	Song	Album	Billboard Hot 100	US Mainstream Rock
1984	"Turn Up the Radio"	Sign In Please	29	17
1985	"Send Her to Me"	Sign In Please	-	-
1986	"Blondes in Black Cars"	That's the Stuff	-	38
1986	"That's the Stuff"	That's the Stuff	-	-
1987	"Loud and Clear"	Loud and Clear	-	-
1987	"Dance All Night"	Loud and Clear	-	-
1987	"She Never Looked That Good For Me"	Loud and Clear	-	-
2015	"You Are Us, We are You"	Louder	-	-
2015	"I Lost My Mind in America"	Louder	-	-
2015	"Get off your ass"	Louder	-	-
2020	"Souls on Fire"	[Non-Album Track]	-	-
2022	"This Ain’t The Place I Wanna Be"	Beyond	-	-
2022	"To Be Together"	Beyond	-	-
2022	"Take Me Higher"	Beyond	-	-

== See also ==
- List of glam metal bands and artists
