= List of Billboard 200 number-one albums of 1983 =

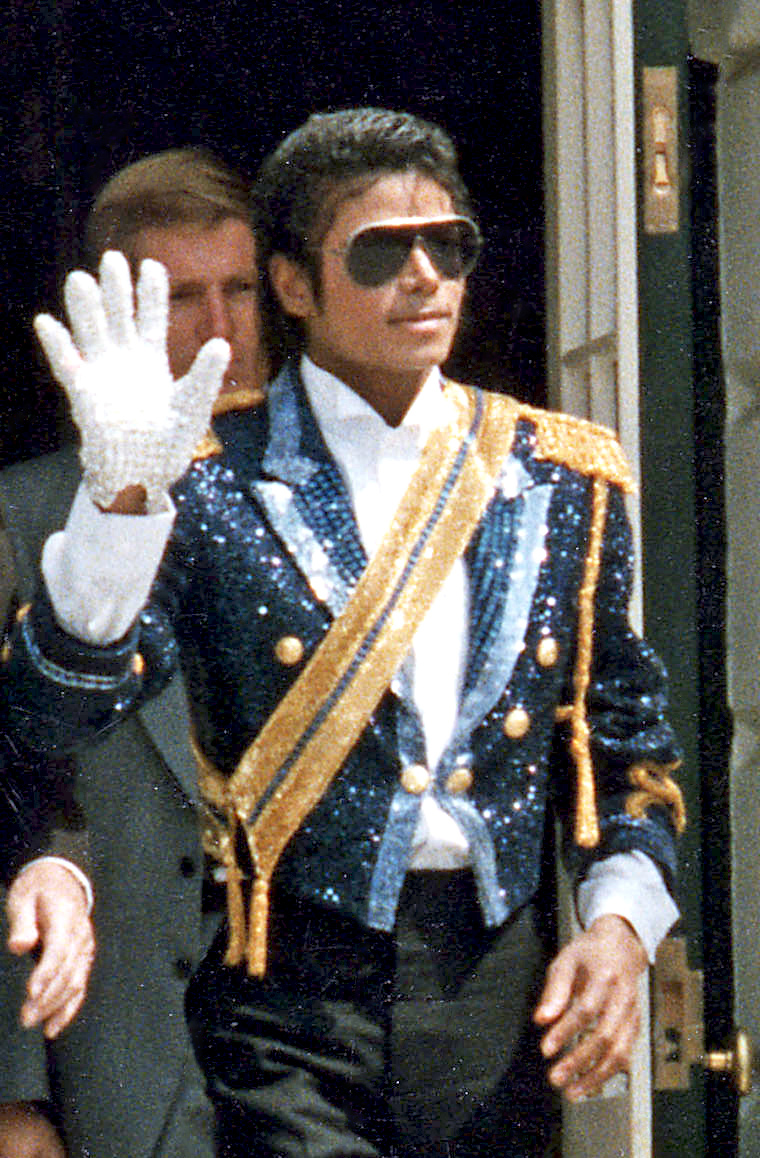
Michael Jackson's sixth album Thriller spent twenty-two weeks at number one, sold more than fifteen million copies to become the best-selling album of 1983, and won the Grammy Award for Album of the Year.

The Billboard 200, published in Billboard magazine, is a weekly chart that ranks the highest-selling music albums and EPs in the United States. In 1983, the name of the chart was Top LPs & Tape. Before Nielsen SoundScan began tracking sales in 1991, Billboard estimated sales from a representative sampling of record stores nationwide, using telephone, fax or messenger service. Data were based on rankings made by the record stores of the best-selling records, not on actual sales figures.

There were six number-one albums on this chart in 1983, including the debut album of the Australian band Men at Work, Business as Usual, which spent the last seven weeks of 1982 and the first eight weeks of 1983 at number one, and was certified quadruple platinum by the Recording Industry Association of America (RIAA) in 1984. Thriller, the sixth studio album by recording artist Michael Jackson, was released in November 1982. It peaked at number one for twenty-two non-consecutive weeks in 1983 with another fifteen consecutive weeks at the top into the following year, and seven songs from the album became top ten singles between late 1982 and early 1984. Two of them: "Billie Jean" and "Beat It", reached the top position of the Billboard Hot 100. Thriller won eight Grammy Awards, including Album of the Year at the 26th Grammy Awards, and was the best-selling album of 1983 with more than fifteen million copies sold. In 2008, twenty-five years after its release, the record was inducted into the Grammy Hall of Fame, and a few weeks later, it was among twenty-five recordings preserved by the Library of Congress to the National Recording Registry as "culturally significant".

Flashdance, the soundtrack to the 1983 musical and romance film of the same name, peaked at number one for two weeks and won the Grammy Award for Best Score Soundtrack Album for a Motion Picture. The two singles released from the album, "Flashdance... What a Feeling" by Irene Cara, and "Maniac" by Michael Sembello, reached the top of the singles chart in 1983. The New York Times considered the British band The Police to be the year's most influential rock band. Australian, British, and American bands copied the white-reggae formula of their (The Police's) earlier successes. The group released their fifth and final studio album, Synchronicity, in 1983. The album, a varied accomplished blend of rock, funk, and third-world rhythms, stayed at number one for seventeen weeks and was certified four times platinum by the RIAA in 1984. Metal Health, the third album by heavy metal band Quiet Riot, peaked at number one for one week, becoming the first heavy metal record to reach the top of the Billboard 200. Singer-songwriter Lionel Richie released his second album Can't Slow Down in 1983, which spent three weeks at the top and won the Grammy Award for Album of the Year at the 27th Grammy Awards.

== Chart history ==
Key
†	Indicates best performing album of 1983

Issue date	Album	Artist(s)	Label	Ref.
January 1	Business as Usual	Men at Work	Columbia	
January 8	Business as Usual	Men at Work	Columbia	
January 15	Business as Usual	Men at Work	Columbia	
January 22	Business as Usual	Men at Work	Columbia	
January 29	Business as Usual	Men at Work	Columbia	
February 5	Business as Usual	Men at Work	Columbia	
February 12	Business as Usual	Men at Work	Columbia	
February 19	Business as Usual	Men at Work	Columbia	
February 26	Thriller †	Michael Jackson	Epic	
March 5	Thriller †	Michael Jackson	Epic	
March 12	Thriller †	Michael Jackson	Epic	
March 19	Thriller †	Michael Jackson	Epic	
March 26	Thriller †	Michael Jackson	Epic	
April 2	Thriller †	Michael Jackson	Epic	
April 9	Thriller †	Michael Jackson	Epic	
April 16	Thriller †	Michael Jackson	Epic	
April 23	Thriller †	Michael Jackson	Epic	
April 30	Thriller †	Michael Jackson	Epic	
May 7	Thriller †	Michael Jackson	Epic	
May 14	Thriller †	Michael Jackson	Epic	
May 21	Thriller †	Michael Jackson	Epic	
May 28	Thriller †	Michael Jackson	Epic	
June 4	Thriller †	Michael Jackson	Epic	
June 11	Thriller †	Michael Jackson	Epic	
June 18	Thriller †	Michael Jackson	Epic	
June 25	Flashdance	Soundtrack	Casablanca	
July 2	Flashdance	Soundtrack	Casablanca	
July 9	Thriller †	Michael Jackson	Epic	
July 16	Thriller †	Michael Jackson	Epic	
July 23	Synchronicity	The Police	A&M	
July 30	Synchronicity	The Police	A&M	
August 6	Synchronicity	The Police	A&M	
August 13	Synchronicity	The Police	A&M	
August 20	Synchronicity	The Police	A&M	
August 27	Synchronicity	The Police	A&M	
September 3	Synchronicity	The Police	A&M	
September 10	Thriller †	Michael Jackson	Epic	
September 17	Synchronicity	The Police	A&M	
September 24	Synchronicity	The Police	A&M	
October 1	Synchronicity	The Police	A&M	
October 8	Synchronicity	The Police	A&M	
October 15	Synchronicity	The Police	A&M	
October 22	Synchronicity	The Police	A&M	
October 29	Synchronicity	The Police	A&M	
November 5	Synchronicity	The Police	A&M	
November 12	Synchronicity	The Police	A&M	
November 19	Synchronicity	The Police	A&M	
November 26	Metal Health	Quiet Riot	Pasha	
December 3	Can't Slow Down	Lionel Richie	Motown	
December 10	Can't Slow Down	Lionel Richie	Motown	
December 17	Can't Slow Down	Lionel Richie	Motown	
December 24	Thriller †	Michael Jackson	Epic	
December 31	Thriller †	Michael Jackson	Epic	

== See also ==
- 1983 in music
