= Rough Cutt Live =

Live album by Rough Cutt
- Released: October 22, 1996
- Studio: Apache Studios, Portland, Oregon, MT Studios, Los Angeles, California
- Genre: Heavy metal
- Length: 60:51
- Label: DeRock
- Producer: Rough Cutt

Rough Cutt chronology
Wants You! (1986)	Rough Cutt Live (1996)	Sneak Peek EP (2000)

Professional ratings
Review scores
Source	Rating
AllMusic	3/5 stars
Collector's Guide to Heavy Metal	6/10

Rough Cutt Live is a live album by the American heavy metal band Rough Cutt. The live album contains three new studio tracks.

== Track listing ==
1. "Let 'em Talk" – 3:46
2. "Bad Reputation" – 4:45
3. "We Like It Loud" – 4:15
4. "Double Trouble" – 3:22
5. "Black Widow" – 4:44
6. "Take Her" – 3:57
7. "Dreamin' Again" – 5:27
8. "Dressed to Kill" – 4:11
9. "Cutt Your Heart Out" / "Rock the USA" – 2:27
10. "Piece of My Heart" – 6:52
11. "House of Pain" (studio track) – 4:15
12. "Prowler" (studio track) – 6:03
13. "Peyote" (studio track) – 6:47

== Line–Up ==
- Paul Shortino – lead vocals
- Amir Derakh – guitar
- Chris Hager – guitar
- Matt Thorr – bass
- Dave Alford – drums
