= Sign In Please =

Studio album by Autograph
- Released: September 27, 1984
- Studio: Record Plant (Los Angeles)
- Genres: Hard rock, glam metal
- Length: 42:15
- Label: RCA
- Producer: Neil Kernon

Autograph chronology
Sign In Please (1984)	That's the Stuff (1985)

Singles from Sign In Please
- 1. "Turn Up the Radio" Released: 1984; 2. "Send Her to Me" Released: 1984; 3. "My Girlfriend's Boyfriend Isn't Me" Released: 1984

Professional ratings
Review scores
Source	Rating
AllMusic	4.5/5 stars

Sign In Please is the debut studio album by American rock band Autograph, released on September 27, 1984, by RCA Records. The album features the band's only hit and signature song, "Turn Up the Radio".

"Turn Up the Radio" was featured in a variety of media in coming years and is regarded as an '80s glam metal staple.

== Background ==
According to lead guitarist Steve Lynch, the album took 30 days to record and master; "We were seasoned musicians in the studio so worked very fast and were always well prepared." He also noted that its major hit, "Turn Up the Radio", was recorded at the tail end of the Sign in Please sessions and that RCA didn't find it suitable enough for inclusion. However, after stern insistence, the band was able to get it on the album. Neither party, however, expected it to gain such critical success that led to the album's gold status in 1985.

== Track listing ==
Side one
No.	Title	Writer(s)	Length
1.	"Send Her to Me"	Doug Foxworthy, Steve Plunkett	3:55
2.	"Turn Up the Radio"	Plunkett, Steve Isham, Randy Rand, Steve Lynch, Keni Richards	4:38
3.	"Nighteen & Non-Stop"	Foxworthy, Plunkett	4:20
4.	"Cloud 10"	Foxworthy, Plunkett	3:37
5.	"Deep End"	Plunkett	4:19

Side two
No.	Title	Writer(s)	Length
6.	"My Girlfriend's Boyfriend Isn't Me"	Foxworthy, Isham, Plunkett	3:33
7.	"Thrill of Love"	Isham, Plunkett	3:59
8.	"Friday"	Plunkett	4:11
9.	"In the Night"	Rand, Plunkett	3:56
10.	"All I'm Gonna Take"	Lynch, Plunkett	5:42
11.	"Turn Up the Radio" (Remix 2009 Rock Candy remaster bonus track)	Plunkett, Steve Isham, Randy Rand, Steve Lynch, Keni Richards	4:38

== Uses in popular culture ==
- "Turn Up the Radio" was featured in the 2002 action-adventure video game Grand Theft Auto: Vice City on the in-game rock radio station V-Rock.
- "Turn Up the Radio" can be heard during the fight with Konstantin Brayko in the 2010 action role-playing video game Alpha Protocol.
- The track "All I'm Gonna Take" was featured in the 2006 action-adventure video game Grand Theft Auto: Vice City Stories.
- "Turn Up the Radio" was featured in the 2010 science-fiction comedy film Hot Tub Time Machine.
- "Turn Up the Radio" plays during an introductory cutscene from — and is featured on the soundtrack of — the 2021 action-adventure video game Marvel's Guardians of the Galaxy.

== Personnel ==
Autograph

- Steve Plunkett – lead vocals, guitar
- Steve Lynch – lead guitar
- Randy Rand – bass, backing vocals
- Steven Isham – keyboards, backing vocals
- Keni Richards – drums, "noises"

Production

- Neil Kernon – producer, engineer, mixing
- Eddie DeLena – engineer, mixing
- Bernie Grundman – mastering

== Charts ==
=== Weekly charts ===
Chart (1984–1985)	Peak position
Canada Top Albums/CDs (RPM)	25
US Billboard 200	29

=== Year-end charts ===
Chart (1985)	Position
Canada Top Albums/CDs (RPM)	96
US Billboard 200	87

== Certifications ==
Region	Certification	Certified units/sales
Canada (Music Canada)	Gold	50,000^{^}
United States (RIAA)	Gold	500,000^{^}
^{^} Shipments figures based on certification alone.
