= Rough Cutt =

American rock band

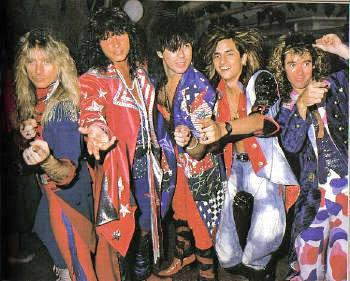
- Rough Cutt in 1986

Background information
- Origin: Los Angeles, California, U.S.
- Genres: Hard rock; glam metal
- Years active: 1981–1987, 2016–present
- Labels: Warner Bros.; DeRock; MusicWorks; Wounded Bird; Deadline
- Spinoffs: Jailhouse
- Members: Paul Shortino; Amir Derakh; Matt Thorr
- Past members: Dave Alford; Chris Hager; Steven St. James; Jeff Buehner; Darren Housholder; Jake E. Lee; Craig Goldy; Joey Cristofanilli; Claude Schnell; Parramore McCarty

Rough Cutt is an American glam metal band from Los Angeles that released two studio albums on Warner Bros. Records in the mid-1980s. Rough Cutt never achieved the commercial success enjoyed by many other Los Angeles bands of that time, but various members went on to find success in other groups, including Jake E. Lee with Ozzy Osbourne, Amir Derakh with Orgy and Julien-K, Paul Shortino with Quiet Riot, and Craig Goldy and Claude Schnell with Dio.

A more recent lineup of Rough Cutt, which debuted in November 2019 at the Bossanova Ballroom in Portland, Oregon, included drummer Dave Alford, first guitarist Chris Hager, second guitarist Darren Housholder (Shrapnel Records recording artist; Love/Hate, War & Peace), bassist Jeff Buehner (The Loyal Order), and lead vocalist Steven St. James (Motown Records; Kagny & The Dirty Rats).

== History ==
=== Formation ===
The first Rough Cutt lineup featured vocalist Paul Shortino, drummer Dave Alford, guitarist Jake E. Lee, keyboardist Claude Schnell, and bassist Joey Cristofanilli. Both Lee and Alford had previously been in another Los Angeles band, Ratt. Schnell and Cristofanilli had previously been in the band Magic.

Two other former Ratt members and bandmates in Sarge—guitarist Chris Hager and bassist Matt Thorne, a.k.a. Matt Thorr (who replaced Cristofanilli)—would also soon join Rough Cutt. After his departure, Cristofanilli temporarily joined Ratt himself, later joining forces with members of the band Sin, who went on to release the album Made in Heaven under the name Jag Wire in 1985.

=== Dio influence ===
Lee left Rough Cutt in 1982, auditioned for and was briefly hired by the band Dio, and then replaced the deceased Randy Rhoads as Ozzy Osbourne's guitarist. Lee, in turn, was replaced by Craig Goldy, formerly of the San Diego band Vengeance. Ronnie James Dio greatly influenced the development of the band. Dio's wife, Wendy Dio, was the group's manager, and Dio himself helped write one of the band's songs. Rough Cutt contributed two tracks, "A Little Kindness" and "Used & Abused," both produced by Dio and featuring Jake E. Lee on guitar, to the compilation album L.A.'s Hottest Unsigned Bands, issued in 1983. Another Dio-produced track, "Try a Little Harder," with Goldy on guitar, appeared on the KLOS 95 1/2: Rock to Riches compilation, along with another Wendy Dio project, NuHaven, released later in 1983. Goldy soon left the band and went on to play in Giuffria, and later in Dio's band. Goldy was replaced by Amir Derakh, another San Diego band alumnus.

With the lineup solidified with Shortino, Alford, Derakh, Hager, and Thorne, Rough Cutt was signed to Warner Bros. Records in 1984. The band gained national exposure when they appeared on the Rock Palace TV show, performing the songs "Crank It Up," "Dreamin' Again," "Street Gang Livin'," and "Try a Little Harder." Hosted by comedian Howie Mandel, the recording took place on January 1, 1984, at the Hollywood Palace, now the Avalon Hollywood. Rough Cutt also made their way to Europe, showcasing at London's famed Marquee Club on April 13, 1984, and playing a poorly promoted show at the Fabrik in Hamburg, Germany, both well in advance of recording their first studio album.

=== First album ===
After waiting around for a year to work with producer Ted Templeman, who had signed the band to Warner Bros. but was busy with David Lee Roth, Eric Clapton, and Aerosmith at the time, Rough Cutt decided to record their debut album, Rough Cutt (1985), with Tom Allom instead. The band toured extensively in the United States as an opening act supporting Krokus on their The Blitz tour, alongside Accept, followed by an extensive trek with Dio on their Sacred Heart tour, which lasted from August through December 1985. Rough Cutt was also part of the Super Rock '85 festival bill on August 10, 1985, at Odaiba-Undohiroba in Odaiba, Tokyo, Japan, sharing the stage with headliners Dio, Foreigner, Mama's Boys, Sting, and Japanese act Earthshaker. The show was commemorated with a VHS release titled Super Rock In Japan '85; Rough Cutt was featured with four songs from their debut album: "Black Widow," "Take Her," "Dreamin' Again," and "Piece of My Heart."

=== Second album ===
Veteran producer Jack Douglas of Aerosmith fame guided the band's follow-up effort, Wants You! (1986). Rough Cutt joined Dio on the last date of their Sacred Heart tour at the R.C. Coliseum in San Juan, Puerto Rico on October 10, 1986, and once again made their way to Japan. While in Japan, Shortino made the decision to leave the band due to internal differences about the direction their music should take. Rough Cutt's manager, Wendy Dio, introduced Shortino to Quiet Riot and engineered a deal for him to step in as their new lead singer in place of Kevin DuBrow, who had been fired. Shortino was briefly replaced by Parramore McCarty of Warrior before Rough Cutt called it quits. Derakh, Thorne, and Alford regrouped with singer Danny Simon and guitarist Michael Raphael to form Jailhouse, releasing a live EP, Alive in a Mad World, in 1989; while Hager teamed up with Jeff Warner of Black 'N Blue in Woop & the Count. Thorne was also briefly a member of L.A. Rocks, renamed Eyes once vocalist James Christian joined, while Derakh found major success with the self-proclaimed death pop band Orgy in the late 1990s.

In 1996, DeRock Records released Rough Cutt Live, which contained three new studio cuts, "House of Pain," "Prowler," and "Peyote," as bonus tracks. The same label would also issue a full-length studio album by Rough Cutt offshoot Jailhouse in 1998, with all five songs from the 1989 Alive in a Mad World EP added as bonus tracks.

=== New lineup ===
Shortino reformed Rough Cutt in 2000 with an all-new lineup that included former Aerosmith guitarist Jimmy Crespo, keyboardist James "J.T." Garrett, Shortino's former Quiet Riot bandmate bassist Sean McNabb, and Magnitude 9 drummer John Homan. The band announced the release of an EP titled Sneak Peek in 2000, but it was canceled and expanded into a full-length album instead. Sacred Place was released in 2002 under the name Paul Shortino's The Cutt on Shortino's own MusicWorks Entertainment label and featured additional contributions by guitarists Brad Gillis, Carlos Cavazo, Howard Leese, and Dave Whiston, as well as bassists Chuck Wright and Jason Boyleston.

The classic Warner Bros. era lineup of Rough Cutt reunited for a one-off show in October 2002 at the Viper Room in Hollywood, with Shortino, Alford, Derakh, Hager, and Thorne performing together once again.

In late 2005, Wounded Bird Records reissued both Rough Cutt Warner Bros. studio albums as a two-for-one single disc, Rough Cutt/Rough Cutt Wants You. British label Rock Candy reissued remastered versions of both albums in 2016, complete with 16-page full-color booklets, 3,500-word essays about the making of the albums with new band member interviews, and enhanced artwork.

In 2008, Deadline Records issued the double disc Anthology, consisting of pre- and post-Warner Bros. era demos and a live set recorded in Syracuse, New York, in 1985. In October 2019, 10 songs from the Fiddler's Studio Sessions portion of the Anthology were released as The Fiddler Sessions '84 on limited edition red vinyl, with only 300 copies made.

In 2016, the classic lineup of Shortino, Alford, Derakh, Hager, and Thorne reunited again. They performed on the Monsters of Rock cruise in 2018.

In 2019, Shortino sang and played lead guitar for Carlos Cavazo's Rough Riot, while Alford and Hager began auditioning musicians to complete the Rough Cutt lineup. During this time, they signed with David Adkins and Integrity Music Management. After hiring vocalist Steven St. James—whom Hager had previously played with in Sarge during his pre-Rough Cutt days—the band added Buehner and then Housholder. After three rehearsals, the new Rough Cutt played its first live show, opening for L.A. Guns featuring Tracii Guns and Phil Lewis in Portland, Oregon, at the Bossanova Ballroom on Black Friday, November 29, 2019. Rough Cutt closed its 10-song set by playing "You Wanna Be a Star," a song written by Hager, St. James, and Alford. According to Alford in an interview after the performance, the song aired on an episode of the 1980s television series Fame and had not been played live by Rough Cutt since the 1980s, when arena audiences of the time failed to appreciate it.

Former Rough Cutt bassist Matt Thorne most recently played rhythm guitar with the band Platinum Overdose, whose debut album, Murder in High Heels, was released on the Demon Doll label in August 2019.

On June 8, 2021, a reformed version of Rough Cutt featuring original members Paul Shortino, Amir Derakh, and Matt Thorne released a new album, 3, on CD and digital platforms. It was their first new album since 1986's Wants You. Another version of Rough Cutt existed, featuring Dave Alford and Chris Hager. However, they claimed there were "no ill feelings between the two groups."

In mid 2024, founding member Dave Alford put together another new lineup to be called Rockin' Dave's Rough Cutt. The lineup includes bassist Shawn Love and vocalist Scott Board, both from North Carolina. The lineup was then rounded out with guitarists Tony Baker and Nathan Smith, hailing from Georgia.

== Members ==
Current members

- Paul Shortino – lead vocals (1981–1987, 2016–2019, 2021–present)
- Matt Thorr – bass, backing vocals (1983–1987, 2016–2019, 2021–present)
- Amir Derakh – guitar, synthesizers (1984–1987, 2016–2019, 2021–present)

Former members

- Dave Alford – drums, backing vocals (1982–1987, 2016–2019)
- Chris Hager – guitar (1983–1987, 2016–2019; died 2025)
- Jake E. Lee – guitar (1981–1982)
- Claude Schnell – keyboards (1981–1982)
- Joey Cristofanilli – bass (1981–1982)
- Craig Goldy – guitar (1982–1983)
- Parramore McCarty – lead vocals (1987)
- Jeff Mayer – lead vocals
- Steven St. James – lead vocals (2019)
- Jeff Buehner – bass (2019)
- Darren Housholder – guitar (2019)

== Discography ==
=== Studio albums ===
- Rough Cutt (1985)
- Wants You! (1986)
- Rough Cutt 3 (2021)

=== Live albums ===
- Rough Cutt Live (1996)

=== Compilation albums ===
- Anthology (2008)
- The Fiddler Sessions '84 (2019)

=== Guest appearances ===
- "A Little Kindness", "Used & Abused" (from the compilation album, LA's Hottest Unsigned Rock Bands) (1983)
- "Try a Little Harder" (from the compilation album, KLOS 95 1/2: Rock to Riches) (1983)
- Super Rock '85 in Japan VHS (1985)
