= Stephen Pearcy =

American rock singer (born 1956)

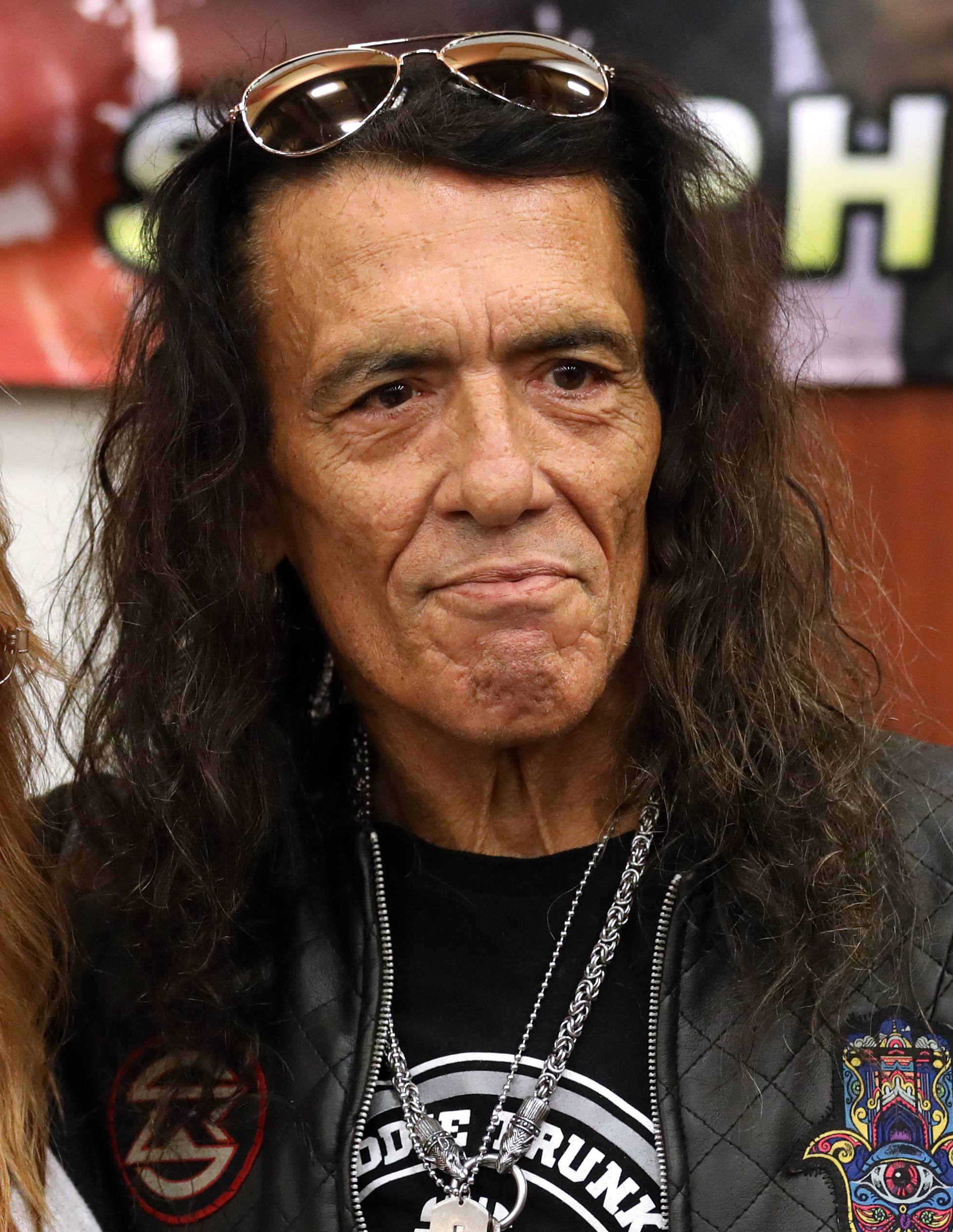
- Pearcy in 2024

Background information
- Born: Stephen Eric Pearcy; July 3, 1956 (age 70); Long Beach, California, U.S.
- Genres: Heavy metal, glam metal, hard rock
- Occupations: Singer, songwriter
- Years active: 1970–present

Stephen Eric Pearcy (born July 3, 1956) is an American musician who is the founder, lead singer and a songwriter of the heavy metal band Ratt. He also created bands including Arcade, Vicious Delite and Vertex, and has recorded seven albums as a solo artist. Pearcy created his own indie label in 1995 to release his solo albums and music for TV, commercial and movies.

== Career ==
In his early teens, Pearcy aspired to be a top fuel race car driver and expressed no desire to pursue a career in music. He started the bands Firedome and Crystal Pystal. Pearcy also wrote most of the music for his new band that he named Mickey Ratt (formed in San Diego in 1977).

Pearcy moved his band Mickey Ratt to Los Angeles and Hollywood in 1980.

In 1981, the band's name was shortened to Ratt, and the lineup was solidified in 1983. Playing clubs such as The Troubadour, The Roxy and The Whisky, Ratt amassed a large local following. After releasing an eponymous six-song EP in 1983 that sold 200,000 copies, Ratt released its breakthrough album, Out of the Cellar, on Atlantic Records in 1984. The debut album sold almost 3 million copies in the US by the end of 1984. The band opened arena shows and tours for ZZ Top, Ozzy Osbourne and Billy Squier. "Out of the Cellar" eventually went five times platinum, and the band headlined its own tours around the world for the next ten years. After releasing four consecutive multi-platinum records and five gold albums with Ratt, Pearcy left the band in 1992.

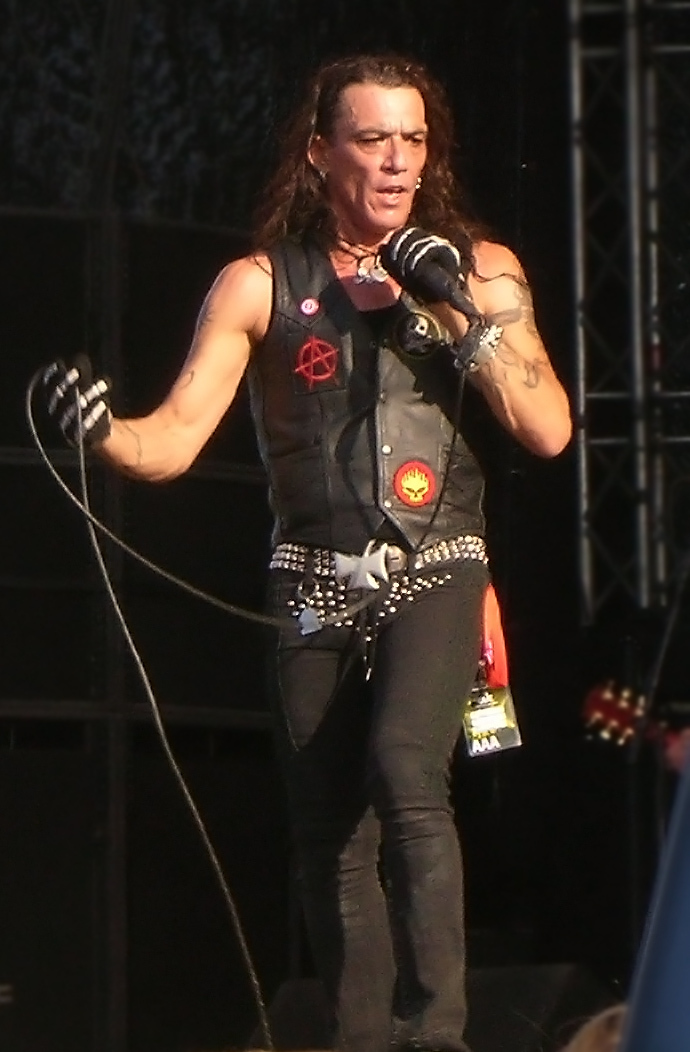
at Sweden Rock 2008

Pearcy and former Cinderella drummer Fred Coury formed the band Arcade in 1992. Arcade released a self-titled album in 1993 and another album the following year. In 1996, Pearcy dabbled in an industrial metal band called Vertex (with Megadeth's Al Pitrelli and drummer / electronic producer Hiro Kuretani).

Pearcy reunited with Ratt in 1996, minus Robbin Crosby and Juan Croucier, only to leave the band for a second time in 2000 on the eve of a tour due to differences over the financial allocation amongst band members.

Pearcy rejoined Ratt in 2006 before leaving again on April 24, 2014, explaining he was "officially done with having anything to do with them due to the constant turmoil, unresolved business, personal attacks/threats in the public forum, and most of all, the disrespect to the fans".

On November 29, 2016, Pearcy and other members of Ratt announced the upcoming Back for More Tour 2007.

In April 2020, Pearcy appeared with Ratt in a television commercial for the insurance company Geico, where new homeowners lament that they "have a Ratt problem."

Pearcy has recorded (6) solo records under his own indie label Top Fuel Records. The latest, “The Dogg Mob” soon to be released in the fall 2026. The last solo album "View to a Thrill", was released on Frontiers Music/Top Fuel Records in November 2018; the music from the album was written by Pearcy and guitarist Erik Ferentinos. Recording at MT Studios with long time original Ratt bassist Matt Thorne. The album is engineered, recorded, mixed and co produced with Matt.

2024, as a guest, Pearcy is singing the song "Shoot Shoot" on the Michael Schenker album My Years with UFO.

== Personal life ==
Pearcy is married to Kristi Adair. He has a daughter born 1995.

=== Health ===
Pearcy underwent two knee replacement surgeries in 2019, three months after two Ratt shows. The singer remains sober seven years to date.

In the rockumentary "Nothing to Lose: A Stephen Pearcy Rockumentary" (2021), produced and directed by Kristi Adair, Pearcy’s wife and Co CEO of Top Fuel Entertainment. The company TFE manages Pearcy. The singer confirmed that he beat his liver cancer after having chemotherapy and an ablation procedure that removed his cancer completely. Also with the help of Kristi, he was put subsequently on a maintenance program to make certain that his cancer did not return. As of 2026, eight years after having been diagnosed, he was free of cancer.

Agent for SEPearcy at Jim Lentz www.TKO.com 2026

== Stephen Pearcy of RATT solo band members 2026 ==
- Stephen Pearcy – lead vocals, guitar, writer, producer (1980–present)
- Erik Ferentinos – lead and rhythm guitar, backing vocals, co-writer (2001–present)
- Matt Thorr – bass, keyboards, backing vocals (2005, 2013–present) co producer, engineer
- Blas Elias – drums (2024–present)
- Joel Hoekstra — lead and rhythm guitar, backing vocals (2026-present)

== Discography ==
With	Year	Title	Label	US Billboard peak	US sales
Ratt	1983	Ratt	Time Coast / Atlantic	133	150,000
Ratt	1984	Out of the Cellar	Atlantic	7	5 million
Ratt	1985	Invasion of Your Privacy	Atlantic	7	3 million
Ratt	1986	Dancing Undercover	Atlantic	26	Platinum+
Ratt	1988	Reach for the Sky	Atlantic	17	Platinum+
Ratt	1990	Detonator	Atlantic	23	750,000
Ratt	1991	Ratt & Roll 81-91	Atlantic	57	Platinum
Arcade	1993	Arcade	Sony	133	100,000+
Arcade	1994	A/2	Sony		40,000+
Vicious Delite	1995	Vicious Delite	Top Fuel Records		
Vertex	1996	Vertex	Blue Dolphin		
Ratt	1997	Collage	RATT Records		
Ratt	1999	Ratt	Portrait Records	169	(200,000 est world)
Solo	2000	Before And Laughter	Top Fuel Records		
Solo	2002	Social Intercourse	Top Fuel Records		
Solo	2006	Fueler	Top Fuel Records		
Solo	2006	Stripped	Sidewinder Records		
Solo	2008	Under My Skin	Top Fuel Records		
Ratt	2010	Infestation	Loud & Proud / Roadrunner Records	30	150,000+
Solo	2017	Smash	Frontiers Music SRL / Top Fuel Records		
Solo	2018	View to a Thrill	Frontiers Music SRL / Top Fuel Records		
Solo	2026	The Dogg Mob	Top Fuel Records		
