= Glam metal =

Genre of heavy metal music

- Stylistic origins: Heavy metal; glam rock; hard rock; pop rock; glam punk
- Cultural origins: Late 1970s and early 1980s, Los Angeles and New York City

Regional scenes
- Japan; Malaysia

Local scenes
- West Hollywood

Other topics
- Make up; Generation X; power metal; power pop; arena rock; visual kei; rock kapak

Glam metal is a subgenre of heavy metal that features pop-influenced hooks and guitar riffs, upbeat rock anthems, and slow power ballads. It borrows heavily from the fashion and image of 1970s glam rock.

Early glam metal evolved directly from the glam rock movement of the 1970s, as visual elements taken from acts such as T. Rex, David Bowie and New York Dolls (and to a lesser extent, the punk and new wave movements taking place concurrently in New York City) were fused with the decidedly more heavy metal leaning and theatrical acts such as Alice Cooper and Kiss. The first examples of this fusion began appearing in the late 1970s and early 1980s mainly in the United States, particularly on the Los Angeles Sunset Strip music scene. Early glam metal bands include Mötley Crüe, Hanoi Rocks, Ratt, Quiet Riot, Twisted Sister, Bon Jovi and Dokken. Glam metal achieved significant commercial success from approximately 1982 to 1991, bringing to prominence bands such as Poison, Cinderella, and Warrant. From a strictly visual perspective, glam metal is defined by flashy and tight-fitting clothing, makeup, and an overall androgynous aesthetic in which the traditional "denim & leather" aspect of heavy metal culture is replaced by spandex, lace, and usually heavy use of bright colours. In September 2023, Ratt frontman Stephen Pearcy told AXS TV that only a small number of bands had "really kickstarted things" on the Sunset Strip, naming Roxx Regime (later Stryper), Dante Fox (later Great White), W.A.S.P., Quiet Riot, Mötley Crüe, and Ratt as the core group.

Glam metal suffered a decline in popularity in the early-mid 1990s, as the grunge and alternative phenomena revolutionized hard rock, and fans' tastes moved toward a more natural and stripped-down aesthetic and a rejection of the glam metal visual style. During this period, many of the most successful acts of the genre's 1980s pinnacle suddenly found themselves facing disbandment as their audiences moved in another direction. Glam metal has experienced a resurgence since the late 1990s, with successful reunion tours of many popular acts from the genre's 1980s heyday, as well as the emergence of new, predominantly European bands, including the Darkness, Crashdïet, Reckless Love, and American bands Steel Panther and Black Veil Brides.

== Characteristics and fashion ==
Musically, glam metal combines a traditional heavy metal sound with elements of hard rock and punk rock, adding pop-influenced catchy hooks and guitar riffs. Like other heavy metal songs of the 1980s (most notably thrash metal songs), they often feature shred guitar solos. They also include extensive use of harmonies, particularly in the characteristic power ballads – slow, emotional songs that gradually build to a strong finale. These were among the most commercially successful singles in the genre and opened it up to a wider audience that would otherwise not have been attracted to traditional heavy metal. Lyrical themes often deal with love and lust, with songs often directed at a particular woman.

Aesthetically glam metal draws heavily on the glam rock or glitter rock of the 1970s, often with very long backcombed hair, use of hair spray, use of make-up, gaudy clothing and accessories (chiefly consisting of tight denim or leather jeans, spandex, and headbands). The visual aspects of glam metal appealed to music television producers, particularly MTV, whose establishment coincided with the rise of the genre. Glam metal performers became infamous for their debauched lifestyles of drugs, strippers and late-night parties, which were widely covered in the tabloid press.

== Etymology ==
Sociologist Deena Weinstein points to the large number of terms used to describe more commercial forms of heavy metal, which she groups together as lite metal. These include, beside glam metal: melodic metal, false metal, poodle bands, nerf metal, pop metal or metal pop, the last of which was coined by critic Philip Bashe in 1983 to describe bands such as Van Halen and Def Leppard. AllMusic employs the umbrella term "pop metal", which refers a late-1980s variation of pop metal characterized by flashy clothing and heavy makeup influenced by glam rock (as embodied by Poison and Mötley Crüe). Use of the derogatory term "hair metal" started in the early 1990s, as grunge gained popularity at the expense of 1980s metal. In the "definitive metal family tree" of his documentary Metal: A Headbanger's Journey, anthropologist Sam Dunn differentiates pop metal, which includes bands like Def Leppard, Europe, and Whitesnake, from glam metal bands such as Mötley Crüe and Poison.

From the 1980s to the 2000s, the term "butt rock" was used derisively to refer to glam metal bands. The phrase was a semantic continaution of cock rock, referencing the bands in the genre as overly hedonistic. The name's use was particularly commonplace amongst Seattle grunge bands who viewed the genre as overly corporate and misogynistic. This use of the term eventually fell out of favor, as its meaning shifted to refer to post-grunge bands who adopted elements of nu metal, such as Breaking Benjamin, Puddle of Mudd and Seether.

== History ==
=== Predecessors ===
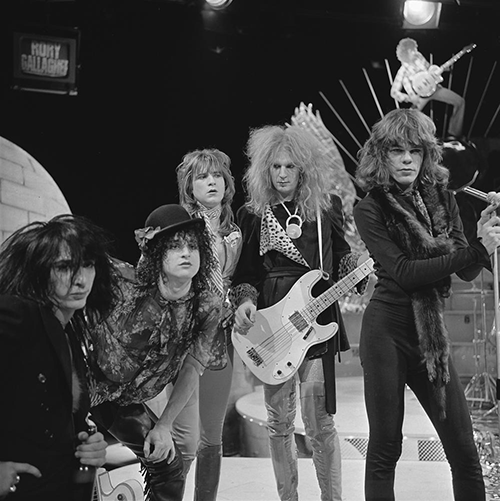
New York Dolls in 1973. Their visual style influenced the look of many 1980s-era glam metal groups.

Music journalist Stephen Davis claims the influences of the style can be traced back to acts like New York Dolls, Aerosmith, Kiss, Cheap Trick, and Boston. Other influences were Sweet, and to a lesser extent Alice Cooper. Finnish band Hanoi Rocks, heavily influenced themselves by the New York Dolls, have been credited with setting a blueprint for the look of hair metal.

Van Halen has been seen as highly influential on the movement, emerging in 1978 from the Los Angeles music scene on Sunset Strip, with a sound based around the lead guitar skills of Eddie Van Halen. He popularized a playing technique of two-handed hammer-ons and pull-offs called tapping, showcased on the song "Eruption" from the album Van Halen. This sound, and lead singer David Lee Roth's stage antics, would be highly influential on glam metal.

=== Mainstream success (1981–1991) ===
==== First wave (1981–1986) ====
Def Leppard, often categorized with the New Wave of British heavy metal, mixed glam rock with heavy metal, helped to define the sound of hard rock for the 1980s decade. In March 1980, Def Leppard released their initial album On Through the Night, its first song "Rock Brigade" provided a hint of this future sound style. In July 1981, Def Leppard released their second album High 'n' Dry, which contained the power ballad "Bringin' On the Heartbreak" and the instrumental "Switch 625", examples of their signature sound style prevalent in their next album Pyromania. High 'n' Dry stayed on the Billboard 200 chart for 123 weeks.

Bands from across the United States began to move towards what would become the glam metal sound. In the fall of 1981, Mötley Crüe (from Los Angeles) released their first album Too Fast for Love, Kix (from western Maryland) released their first album Kix, and Dokken (from Los Angeles) released their first album Breaking the Chains in Europe (later remixed for September 1983 re-release in USA). In November 1982, Night Ranger (from San Francisco) released their initial album Dawn Patrol which reached the top 40 in the United States.

Glam metal broke out in 1983: Def Leppard released its third album Pyromania on January 20, and was the first glam metal album to reach top ten in the Billboard charts on March 12, later it peaked at number two on May 14, then staying in the top ten albums until it dropped to eleventh place on November 26, eventually falling off the Billboard 200 chart after 123 weeks. Quiet Riot's Metal Health was released on March 11, then marched upwards until it reached number one on November 26, eventually falling off the Billboard 200 chart after 81 weeks. The success of Def Leppard and Quiet Riot paved the way for many heavy metal acts, both glam and otherwise, as the decade progressed. Quiet Riot drummer Frankie Banali said there had been "no question" that once Metal Health reached number one, the band had "opened up the door for everyone else," having achieved sales "unheard of for most bands, and certainly at the time unheard of for a hard rock or metal band." Bassist Rudy Sarzo cautioned that several other prominent Sunset Strip acts predated Quiet Riot's breakthrough, noting that Ratt (then performing as Mickey Ratt), Great White, Dokken, and future Mötley Crüe bassist Nikki Sixx (then in the band London) were all already active in the late 1970s.

That same year saw a larger wave of heavy metal albums achieve previously unheard-of commercial success. All of the following were released in September: Mötley Crüe releasing its second album Shout at the Devil, Kiss releasing Lick It Up, and Dokken re-released their first album Breaking the Chains in the USA.

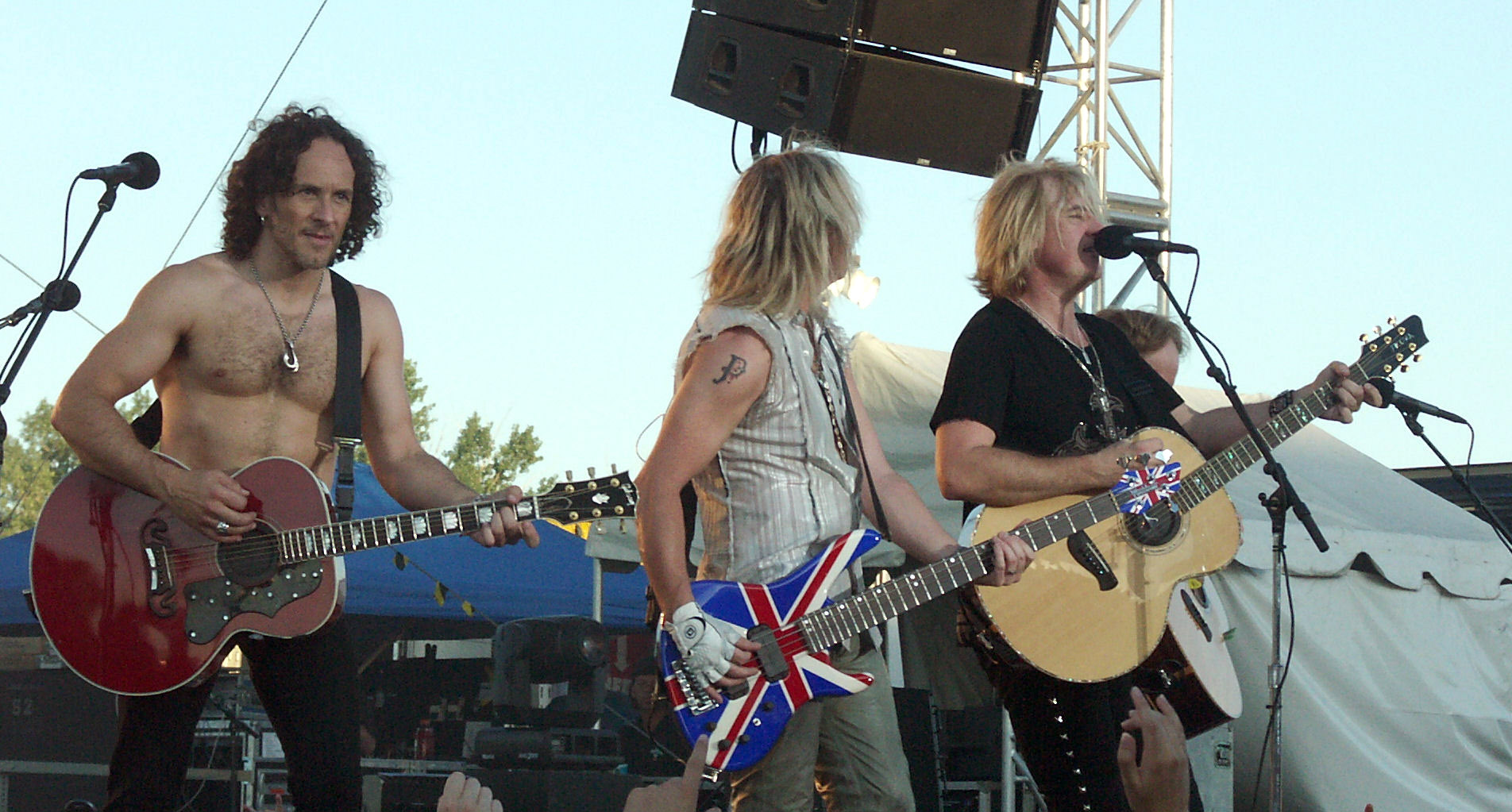
Four Def Leppard songs were on the top ten of the Billboard Hot 100.

Def Leppard's Pyromania, later certified diamond by the Recording Industry Association of America (RIAA), reached number two on the Billboard 200. The singles "Foolin'", "Photograph", and "Rock of Ages", helped by the emergence of MTV, reached the Top 40. Pyromania's style was widely emulated, particularly by the emerging Californian scene. However, remarked Leppard's Joe Elliott, "I don't know how anybody could confuse us with that lot. We weren't even around when all those so-called glam bands came up. We were in fuckin' Holland making Hysteria. While they were out banging chicks or whatever, we were looking at windmills and playing pool on a table without any pockets. We were as far away from LA as any band could be."

The most active glam metal scene was starting to appear in clubs on the Sunset Strip in Los Angeles, including The Trip, the Whisky a Go Go, and the Starwood. These clubs refrained from booking punk rock bands because of fears of violence and began booking many metal bands instead, usually on a "pay to play" basis, thus creating a vibrant scene for hard rock music. An increasing number of metal bands were able to produce debut albums in 1984, including Ratt (from Los Angeles) with its breakthrough album Out of the Cellar, Bon Jovi (from New Jersey) with its debut Bon Jovi, Great White with Great White, Black 'n Blue (from Portland, Oregon) with Black 'n Blue, Autograph with its first album Sign In Please, and W.A.S.P. with its self-titled debut album. In 1985, many more commercially successful glam metal albums began to appear, including Mötley Crüe's third album Theatre of Pain, Ratt's second album Invasion of Your Privacy, Dokken's third album Under Lock and Key, Stryper's first full-length album Soldiers Under Command, Bon Jovi's second release 7800° Fahrenheit, and Autograph's second album That's The Stuff. Los Angeles continued to foster the most important scene around the Sunset Strip, with groups like London, which had originally formed as a glam rock band in the 1970s, and had seen future members of Mötley Crüe, Cinderella and Guns N' Roses pass through its ranks, finally releasing their début album Non Stop Rock in 1985 as well. The success of Mötley Crüe's 1985 song "Home Sweet Home" popularized "power ballads" in glam metal and opened up new commercial opportunities for glam bands.

==== Second wave (1986–1991) ====
By the mid-late 1980s, glam metal had begun to achieve major mainstream success in America with many of these bands' music videos appearing on heavy rotation on MTV, often at the top of the channel's daily dial countdown, and some of the bands appeared on the channel's shows such as Headbangers Ball, which became one of the most popular programs with over 1.3 million views a week. The groups also received heavy rotation on radio stations such as KNAC in Los Angeles.

Another significant year for glam metal was 1986. Bon Jovi put out Slippery When Wet in that year, which was one of the most commercially significant releases of the era. The album mixed metal with a pop sensibility and spent a total of eight weeks atop the Billboard 200 album chart, selling over 15 million copies in the United States. It became the first hard rock album to spawn three top ten singles, two of which reached number one. The album has been credited with widening the audience for the genre, particularly by appealing to women as well as the traditional male-dominated audience, and opening the door to MTV and commercial success for other bands at the end of the decade.

The Swedish band Europe released the anthemic album The Final Countdown which reached the top ten in several countries, including the U.S., and the album's title single reached number one in 26 countries. Stryper made their mainstream breakthrough in 1986 with the release of their platinum album To Hell with the Devil, the first album by Enigma Records ever to enter the top 40. The single "Calling On You" consistently ranked among MTV's most-requested videos and added to at least 35 radio station playlists nationwide. The album achieved gold status in mid-February 1987. Two Pennsylvania bands, Harrisburg's Poison and Philadelphia's Cinderella, released multi-platinum debut albums in 1986, respectively Look What the Cat Dragged In and Night Songs. Van Halen released 5150, their first album with Sammy Hagar on lead vocals, which was number one in the U.S. for three weeks and sold over six million copies. Additionally, some established hard rock and heavy metal bands of the era such as Scorpions, Whitesnake, Dio, Aerosmith, Kiss, Alice Cooper, Ozzy Osbourne, Judas Priest, Saxon and Accept began incorporating hair metal elements into their sounds and images, as the genre's popularity skyrocketed in 1985–1986.

Glam metal bands continued their run of commercial success in 1987 with Mötley Crüe releasing Girls, Girls, Girls, White Lion releasing Pride, and Def Leppard releasing Hysteria producing a hard rock record of seven hit singles which stayed on the Billboard 200 chart for 136 weeks. Another of the greatest successes of the era was Guns N' Roses, although the band themselves reject the term. Originally formed from a fusion of bands L.A. Guns and Hollywood Rose, they released the best-selling debut of all time, Appetite for Destruction. With a "grittier" and "rawer" sound than most glam metal, incorporating elements of punk and blues, Appetite for Destruction produced three top 10 hits, including the number one "Sweet Child O' Mine". In the wake of Guns N' Roses's commercial success, other similarly rawer glam metal bands began to gain popularity like L.A. Guns and Faster Pussycat. Critics eventually termed this style sleaze rock or sleaze metal to differentiate it from the perceived increasing commerciality of other glam metal bands. Such was the dominance of the style that Californian hardcore punk band T.S.O.L. moved towards a glam metal sound in this period. In the last years of the 1980s, the most notable glam metal successes were New Jersey (1988) by Bon Jovi and OU812 (1988) by Van Halen; while Open Up and Say... Ahh! (1988) by Poison spawned the number one hit single "Every Rose Has Its Thorn" and eventually sold eight million copies worldwide. Britny Fox from Philadelphia and Winger from New York released their eponymous debuts in 1989. In 1989, Mötley Crüe produced their most commercially successful album, the multi-platinum number one Dr. Feelgood. In the same year eponymous débuts included Danger Danger from New York, Dangerous Toys from Austin, Texas, who provided more of a Southern rock tone to the genre, Enuff Z'Nuff from Chicago who provided an element of psychedelia to their sound and visual style, and Tora Tora from Memphis, Tennessee, who incorporated elements of blues rock into their music. L.A. débuts included Warrant with Dirty Rotten Filthy Stinking Rich (1989), and Skid Row with their eponymous album (1989), which reached number six in the Billboard 200, but they were to be one of the last major bands that emerged in the glam metal era.

Glam metal entered the 1990s as one of the major commercial genres of popular music, but such success would not continue for long; in 1990, débuts for Slaughter, from Las Vegas with Stick It to Ya and FireHouse, from North Carolina, with their eponymous album reached number 18 and number 21 on the Billboard 200 respectively, but it would be the peak of their commercial achievement. Y&T released their last album Ten before the band went on hiatus from a few years.

=== Decline (1991–1997) ===
The 1988 film The Decline of Western Civilization Part II: The Metal Years captured the Los Angeles scene of successful and aspiring bands. It also highlighted the excesses of glam metal, particularly the scene in which W.A.S.P. guitarist Chris Holmes was interviewed while drinking vodka on a floating chair in a swimming pool as his mother watched. As a result, it has been seen as helping to create a backlash against the genre. In the early 1990s glam metal's popularity rapidly declined after nearly a decade of success. Successful bands lost members that were key to their songwriting and/or live performances, such as Mötley Crue's frontman Vince Neil, Poison guitarist C.C. DeVille, Def Leppard guitarist Steve Clark and Guns N' Roses guitarist Izzy Stradlin. Several music writers and musicians began to deride glam metal acts as "hair farmers", hinting at the soon-to-be-popularized term "hair metal". Another reason for the decline in popularity of the style may have been the declining popularity of the power ballad. While its use, especially after a hard-rocking anthem, was initially a successful formula, in the early 1990s audiences lost interest in this approach.

==== The rise of alternative rock ====
By far and away the most significant factor in the decline of glam metal was the rise of alternative rock and grunge music. This included a wave of grunge bands from or around Seattle, such as Nirvana, Alice in Chains, Pearl Jam, and Soundgarden. Other alternative bands such as R.E.M., Radiohead, Stone Temple Pilots, and the Smashing Pumpkins achieved mainstream success in the wake of glam's decline. The decline was particularly obvious after the success of both R.E.M.'s Out of Time (1991) and Nirvana's Nevermind (1991), the latter of which combined elements of hardcore punk and heavy metal into a dirty sound that made use of heavy guitar distortion, fuzz and feedback, along with darker lyrical themes, a stripped-down aesthetic and a complete rejection of the glam metal visual style and performance. The success of bands like R.E.M. and Nirvana gave rise to a more "stripped down" musical style that was more personal and vulnerable. Many major labels felt they had been caught off guard by the surprise success of alternative music and began turning over their personnel in favor of younger staffers more versed in the new scene. Glam acts such as Guns N' Roses and Bon Jovi attempted to adapt their sound to the changing times, whereas bands like Skid Row faded into irrelevance. As MTV shifted its attention to alternative music, glam metal bands found themselves increasingly relegated to late-night airplay, and Headbangers Ball was cancelled at the end of 1994, while KNAC went over to Spanish programming. Given glam metal's lack of a major format presence on radio, bands were left without a clear way to reach their audience. Other L.A. alternative rock bands like the Red Hot Chili Peppers and Jane's Addiction also helped supplant the popularity of the genre.

==== Changing sound ====
Some artists tried to alter their sound, while others struggled on with their original format. In 1995, Van Halen released Balance, a multi-platinum seller that would be the band's last with Sammy Hagar on vocals. In 1996, David Lee Roth returned briefly and his replacement, former Extreme singer Gary Cherone, left the band soon after the release of the commercially unsuccessful 1998 album Van Halen III. Van Halen would not tour or record again until 2004. Welsh rock band Manic Street Preachers' 1992 debut album Generation Terrorists featured a glam metal sound. The album reached No. 1 in the UK Rock Chart, but failed to chart in the United States.

Meanwhile, Guns N' Roses' classic-lineup was whittled away throughout the decade. Drummer Steven Adler was fired in 1990, guitarist Izzy Stradlin left in late 1991 after recording Use Your Illusion I and II with the band. Tensions between the other band members and lead singer Axl Rose continued after the release of the 1993 punk rock covers album "The Spaghetti Incident?". Guitarist Slash left in 1996, followed by bassist Duff McKagan in 1998. Axl Rose, the only remaining member from the classic lineup at that point, worked with several lineups of the band to record Chinese Democracy – an album that would take over ten years to complete.

=== Revivals (1997–present) ===
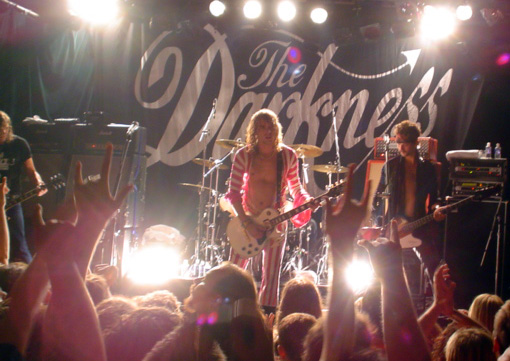
The Darkness performing in Sydney, Australia in 2004

During the late 1990s and 2000s, glam metal began to have a revival. Some established acts who had managed to weather the storm enjoyed renewed popularity, others reformed and new bands emerged to emulate the glam metal style. Bon Jovi were still able to achieve a commercial hit with "It's My Life" (2000). They branched into country music with a version of their 2005 song "Who Says You Can't Go Home", which reached No. 1 on the Hot Country Singles chart in 2006 and the rock/country album Lost Highway which reached No. 1 in 2007. In 2009, Bon Jovi released The Circle, which marked a return to their hard rock sound and reached No. 1 on the Billboard 200. Mötley Crüe reunited with Vince Neil to record the 1997 album Generation Swine and Poison reunited with guitarist C.C. DeVille in 1999, producing the mostly live Power to the People (2000); both bands began to tour extensively. There were reunions and subsequent tours from Van Halen (with Hagar in 2004 and then Roth in 2007). The long-awaited Guns N' Roses album Chinese Democracy was finally released in 2008, but only went platinum in the US, produced no hit singles, and failed to come close to the success of the band's late 1980s and early 1990s material. Europe's "Final Countdown" enjoyed a new lease of popularity as the millennium drew to a close and the band reformed. Other acts to reform included Ratt, Britny Fox, Stryper, and Skid Row.

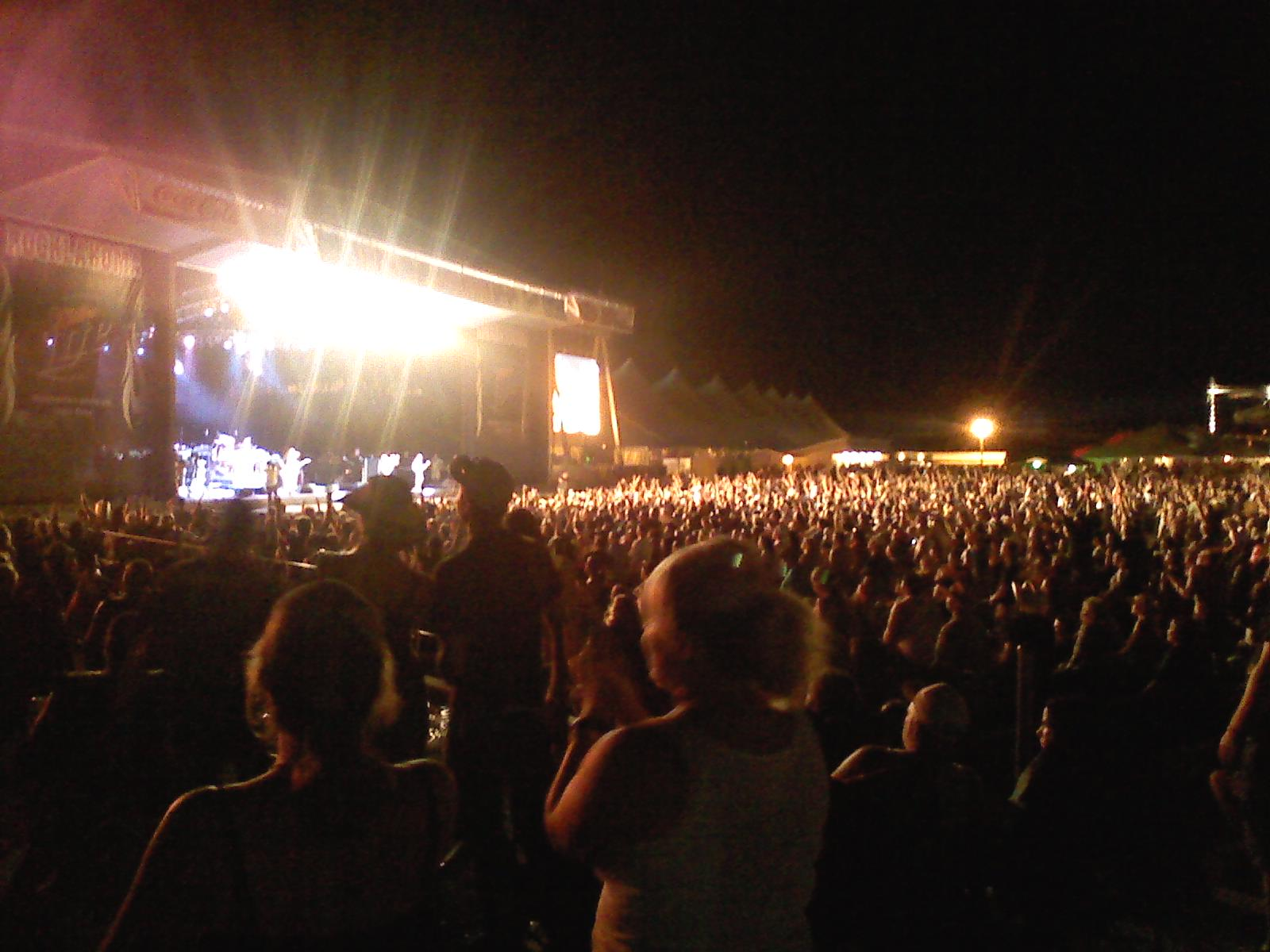
The Rocklahoma festival held in Pryor, Oklahoma in 2008

Beginning in 1999, Monster Ballads, a series of compilation albums that feature popular power ballads, usually from the glam metal genre, capitalized on the nostalgia, with the first volume going platinum. The VH1 sponsored Rock Never Stops Tour, beginning in 1998, has seen many glam metal bands take to the stage again, including on the inaugural tour: Warrant, Slaughter, Quiet Riot, FireHouse, and L.A. Guns. Slaughter also took part in the 1999 version with Ted Nugent, Night Ranger, and Quiet Riot. Poison and Cinderella toured together in 2000 and 2002, and in 2005 Cinderella headlined the Rock Never Stops Tour, with support from Ratt, Quiet Riot, and FireHouse. In 2007 the four-day-long Rocklahoma festival held in Oklahoma included glam metal bands Poison, Ratt and Twisted Sister. Warrant and Cinderella co-headlined the festival in 2008. Nostalgia for the genre was evidenced in the production of the glam metal themed musical Rock of Ages, which ran in Los Angeles in 2006 and in New York in 2008. It was made into a film released in 2012.

The Darkness's Permission to Land (2003), described as an "eerily realistic simulation of '80s metal and '70s glam", topped the UK charts, going quintuple platinum. One Way Ticket to Hell... and Back (2005) reached number 11. The band broke up in 2006, but reunited in 2011, releasing the album Hot Cakes the following year.

In the mid-to late 2000s, there was a minor sleaze rock revival with groups like Hinder and Buckcherry. The latter's breakthrough album 15 (2006) went platinum in the U.S. and spawned the single "Sorry" (2007), which made the top 10 of the Billboard Hot 100. Additionally, a subset of scene bands embraced elements of glam metal. This began with Blessed by a Broken Heart and subsequently popularised by the success of Black Veil Brides, Escape the Fate and Falling in Reverse. Avenged Sevenfold's 2005 album City of Evil also promoted a similar influence, seeing the band depart from their metalcore sound in favour of one indebted to glam metal. At the same time, in Sweden there was a sleaze metal movement attempting to revive the genre, with bands including Hardcore Superstar, Sister, Vains of Jenna, Crashdïet H.E.A.T, and Nestor as well as the Finnish bands Reckless Love and Santa Cruz.

Los Angeles band Steel Panther managed to gain a following by playing 1980s style glam metal.

== See also ==
- List of glam metal albums and songs
- List of glam metal bands and artists

== Citations ==
=== Works cited ===
- Price, Simon (1999). Everything (A Book About Manic Street Preachers). London: Virgin Books. ISBN 0-7535-0139-2.

== General bibliography ==
- Auslander, P., Performing Glam Rock: Gender and Theatricality in Popular Music (Ann Arbor, MI: University of Michigan Press, 2006), ISBN 0-7546-4057-4.
- Batchelor, R., and Stoddart, S., The 1980s (London: Greenwood Publishing Group, 2007), ISBN 0-313-33000-X.
- Bogdanov, V., Woodstra, C., and Erlewine, S. T., All Music Guide to Rock: The Definitive Guide to Rock, Pop, and Soul (Milwaukee, WI: Backbeat Books, 3rd edn., 2002), ISBN 0-87930-653-X.
- Bukszpan, D., The Encyclopedia of Heavy Metal (London: Barnes & Noble Publishing, 2003), ISBN 0-7607-4218-9.
- Chapman, A., and Silber, L., Rock to Riches: Build Your Business the Rock & Roll Way (Capital Books, 2008), ISBN 1-933102-65-9.
- Danville, E., and Mott, C., The Official Heavy Metal Book of Lists (Fayetteville, AR: University of Arkansas Press, 2009), ISBN 0-87930-983-0.
- Davis, S., Watch You Bleed: The Saga of Guns N' Roses (New York: Gotham Books, 2008), ISBN 978-1-59240-377-6.
- Hurd, M. G., Women Directors and their Films (London: Greenwood Publishing Group, 2007), ISBN 0-275-98578-4.
- Macdonald, B., Harrington, J., and Dimery, R., Albums You Must Hear Before You Die (London: Quintet, 2006), ISBN 0-7893-1371-5.
- Moore, R., Sells Like Teen Spirit: Music, Youth Culture, and Social Crisis (New York: New York University Press, 2009), ISBN 0-8147-5748-0.
- Nicholls, D., The Cambridge History of American Music (Cambridge: Cambridge University Press, 1998), ISBN 0-521-45429-8.
- Prato, G., Bang Your Head, Feel the Noize: The Quiet Riot Story (Seattle: Kindle Direct, 2025), ISBN 979-8308354222.
- Prato, G., World Infestation: The Ratt Story (Seattle: Kindle Direct, 2024), ISBN 979-8878218191.
- Smith, C., 101 Albums that Changed Popular Music (Oxford: Oxford University Press, 2009), ISBN 0-19-537371-5.
- Walser, R., Running with the Devil: Power, Gender, and Madness in Heavy Metal Music (Middletown, CT: Wesleyan University Press, 1993), ISBN 0-8195-6260-2.
- Weinstein, D., Heavy Metal: The Music and Its Culture (Cambridge, MA: Da Capo Press, 2000), ISBN 0-306-80970-2.
- Weinstein, D., "Rock critics need bad music", in C. Washburne and M. Derno, eds, Bad Music: the Music we Love to Hate (London: Routledge, 2004), ISBN 0-415-94366-3.
- Yfantis, V., "Power Ballads And The Stories Behind", (Athens: CreateSpace Independent Publishing Platform, 2021), ISBN 1546723404.
