= 1984 in music =

This is a list of notable events in music that took place in 1984.

== Specific locations ==
- 1984 in British music
- 1984 in Japanese music
- 1984 in Norwegian music
- 1984 in Scandinavian music

== Specific genres ==
- 1984 in country music
- 1984 in heavy metal music
- 1984 in hip-hop music
- 1984 in jazz
- 1984 in progressive rock

== Events ==
=== January–March ===
- In January 1984, Iain Williams & the 1984 Project recorded the dance track Love Is Suicide at Trident Studios in Soho, London. The track features Hans Zimmer on Fairlight CM and Alan Murphy on guitar.
- January 11 – BBC Radio 1 DJ Mike Read announces on air that he will not play the single "Relax" by Frankie Goes to Hollywood because of its suggestive lyrics. The BBC places a total ban on the record at about the same time.
- January 17 – The SING BLUE SILVER tour continues on to Japan and North America as Duran Duran becomes the first act to utilize live video cameras and screens in their show. They break every existing merchandise record during this tour.
- January 21 – "Relax" reaches number one in the UK singles chart, despite the BBC ban; it will spend a total of 42 weeks in the Top 40.
- January 27 – Michael Jackson's scalp is burned during the filming of a Pepsi commercial and he is admitted to hospital. Around this time, Jackson also releases the title track from his album Thriller as the LP's final single.
- February 14
  - Elton John marries studio engineer Renate Blauel.
  - Joe Perry and Brad Whitford attend an Aerosmith concert and re-join the band, which embarks on a reunion tour "Back in the Saddle" later in the year.
- February 16 – Jerry Lee Lewis surrenders to federal authorities on charges of income tax evasion. Lewis is later acquitted.
- February 25 – Thompson Twins debuts at number 1 on the UK Albums Chart with Into the Gap. The album would also top the chart the two following weeks and remain on the chart for 38 consecutive weeks until November.
- February 28
  - Recovering from the scalp burns sustained a month earlier, Michael Jackson wins eight Grammy Awards out of 12 nominations at the 26th Annual Grammy Awards, breaking the record for the most Grammys won in a single year. He wins seven for the album Thriller (including Album of the Year and Record of the Year for "Beat It") and one for his work on the audiobook for the film E.T. the Extra-Terrestrial.
  - Hosted by John Denver, this year's Grammys ceremony receives the highest ratings in the awarding body's history, a record currently unmatched. Along with the awards received by Michael Jackson, The Police's "Every Breath You Take" wins Song of the Year, while Culture Club win Best New Artist.
- February 29 – German industrial band KMFDM is founded, and holds its first performance at the Grand Palais in Paris, France.
- March 1
  - Sting plays his last concerts with The Police at the end of the Synchronicity tour; the band takes a "pause" after the tour and only play a few special events together after this, until 2007, when they would organize a reunion tour.
  - Alice Cooper, who has not toured for his last two albums, parts ways with his longtime label Warner Bros. and goes on hiatus from the music industry. Cooper begins mulling over plans for a comeback, which he would carry out in 1986.

=== April–June ===
- April 1
  - New York rock and roll magazine Trouser Press folds after a decade, publishing its 96th and final issue.
  - In Los Angeles, Marvin Gaye is shot and killed during an argument with his father.
- May 1 – Mick Fleetwood, of Fleetwood Mac, files for bankruptcy in the United States.
- May 2 – Lionel Richie's hit "Hello" becomes Motown's first ever UK million-selling single.
- May 5
  - Duran Duran achieve their second UK number 1 single with "The Reflex" and remain at number 1 for four consecutive weeks.
  - The Pretenders singer Chrissie Hynde marries Simple Minds singer Jim Kerr.
  - In Luxembourg, the Eurovision Song Contest 1984 is won by the Swedish entry, "Diggi-Loo Diggi-Ley", performed by the Herreys.
- June 8 – Billy Joel performs at Wembley Arena; the concert is later broadcast on BBC Television in two parts.
- June 16 – Frankie Goes to Hollywood begin a nine-week stay at the top of the UK singles chart with "Two Tribes".
- June 18 – At the climax of a Judas Priest concert at Madison Square Garden, fans begin ripping out the cushions from the seats and throwing them on stage. Judas Priest pay damages through insurance and are banned from Madison Square Garden for life over the incident.
- June 23 – Duran Duran earn their first US number 1 single with "The Reflex", making it their first single to top both the UK and US charts.
- June 25 – Prince releases his sixth album Purple Rain; the album sells over 20 million copies and gives Prince two US number one singles with "When Doves Cry" and "Let's Go Crazy".

=== July–September ===
- July 1 – During his performance at the first ever Cornerstone Festival in Grayslake, Illinois, Steve Taylor jumps off the stage, breaking his ankle. Taylor hops back on stage and finishes his show. The next few shows on Taylor's tour were performed from a wheel chair.
- July 10 – The last original member of Menudo, Ricky Meléndez, leaves the group and is replaced by Ricky Martin. Meanwhile, Menudomania reaches Asia in 1984.
- July 14
  - Eddie Van Halen makes a special guest appearance at a concert by The Jacksons in Dallas, Texas, playing the guitar solo for "Beat It" live.
  - Selena y los Dinos release their first album Mis Primeras Grabaciones.
  - Boothill Foottappers enter the UK singles chart with their single released on the Go! Discs label.
- August 9 – Iron Maiden kicks off the World Slavery Tour in Warsaw, Poland, with shows in Hungary and Yugoslavia soon to follow. This marks the first time a Western band has ever brought a full concert production behind the Iron Curtain.
- August 10 – Red Hot Chili Peppers release their debut album The Red Hot Chili Peppers.
- August 25 – Kathleen Battle makes her solo recital debut at the Salzburg Festival.
- August 31 – Canadian music video channel MuchMusic begins broadcasting. The first video played is Rush's "The Enemy Within".
- September 2 – Van Halen concludes its 1984 world tour with a show in Nuremberg, Germany as part of the Monsters of Rock festival tour. This would be the band's last concert with David Lee Roth as lead singer until 2007.
- September 7 – Janet Jackson elopes with fellow singer James DeBarge. The marriage would be annulled in 1985.
- September 11 – Country singer Barbara Mandrell suffers serious injuries in a head-on automobile collision on a Tennessee highway. She will make a comeback after spending over a year rehabilitating.
- September 14 – The first annual MTV Video Music Awards are held in New York City. Herbie Hancock wins the most awards with five, and The Cars take the highest prize of Video Of The Year for "You Might Think". Much attention is garnered by Madonna's controversial performance of her hit single "Like a Virgin" in which she rolls around on the stage, revealing lacy stockings and garters, and grinds her crotch against her veil.
- September 18 - Seiji Ozawa joins with Kazuyoshi Akiyama to found the Saito Kinen Orchestra in tribute to the memory of the music educator Hideo Saito.
- September 21 – The first compact disc manufacturing plant in North America opens in Terre Haute, Indiana. CDs have previously had to be expensively imported from Japan or West Germany. Bruce Springsteen's Born in the U.S.A. is designated as the first CD ever made in the United States.

=== October–December ===
- October 1 – The Canadian music video series Video Hits premieres on CBC Television.
- October 23 – A report on the Ethiopian famine by BBC journalist Michael Buerk is broadcast in the UK and receives an unprecedented public response. Among those watching is Bob Geldof, who is inspired to release a charity record to raise money to help with famine relief.
- October 26 – Turner Broadcasting System launches Cable Music Channel, a music video channel intended to compete directly with MTV. The first video played is "I Love L.A." by Randy Newman. The channel would only last 34 days.
- November 5 – Bryan Adams releases his breakout album called Reckless, spawning multiple hit singles, achieving diamond certification in Canada and topping the charts in the United States.
- November 10 – The 13th OTI Festival, held at the National Auditorium in Mexico City, Mexico, is won by the song "Agualuna", written and performed by Fernando Ubiergo representing Chile.
- November 20 – Michael Jackson receives a star on the Hollywood Walk of Fame directly in front of Mann's Chinese Theater. Jackson leaves after only three minutes at the request of security, as the crush of 5,000 onlookers becomes a safety concern.
- November 23 – Tears for Fears releases the single Shout, from their second studio album, Songs From the Big Chair. Shout hit the US 1# Billboard Hot 100 in August 1985.
- November 25 – The Band Aid single "Do They Know It's Christmas?" is recorded at SARM Studios in Notting Hill, London, by a gathering of performers that includes Paul Young, Simon Le Bon, Bono, Phil Collins, Paul Weller, Sting, Boy George and Tony Hadley.
- November 28 – The Bring Me Sunshine charity concert at the London Palladium, in memory of Eric Morecambe, includes musical performances by Kenny Ball & His Jazzmen, Des O'Connor and Ernie Wise.
- December – Tipper Gore forms the Parents Music Resource Center (PMRC) in response to the "filth" she hears on her daughter's copy of Prince's Purple Rain.
- December 1 – Frankie Goes to Hollywood become the first act to take their first three singles to the UK #1 position since Gerry & The Pacemakers in 1963, when "The Power of Love" tops the chart.
- December 3 – Bob Geldof and Band Aid release the single "Do They Know It's Christmas?", which becomes the fastest-selling single of all time in the UK.
- December 8
  - Razzle (Nicholas Dingley) of Hanoi Rocks is killed in a car crash. Mötley Crüe member Vince Neil was the driver of the car and was drunk at the time.
  - Cyndi Lauper, with the fourth single from her 1983 debut She's So Unusual, "All Through the Night", becomes the first woman in the 26-year history of the Billboard Hot 100 to have four singles from one album in the top five.
- December 9 – The Jacksons conclude their Victory Tour with the last of six concerts at Dodger Stadium in Los Angeles. At the end of their final show, lead singer Michael Jackson surprises not only his fans, but also his band members with the announcement that he would be permanently leaving the Jacksons, stating that this would be the last time that they all performed together. The tour, which consisted of 55 shows over five months, has reportedly grossed $75 million, a new industry record. As for the Jacksons, they would release one more album in 1989 before splitting up, occasionally regrouping in the years afterward for reunion performances with and without Michael.
- December 11 – While on tour, Bucks Fizz's tour bus crashes. All members of the group are injured and member Mike Nolan suffers brain damage after falling into a coma.
- December 13 – George Harrison makes a rare public appearance, joining Deep Purple on stage in Sydney, Australia for their encore rendition of "Lucille".
- December 31
  - Def Leppard's drummer Rick Allen loses his left arm in a car wreck.
  - The thirteenth annual New Year's Rockin' Eve special airs on ABC, with appearances by Jermaine Jackson, Ronnie Milsap, Night Ranger, Scandal, John Waite and Barry Manilow.
  - UK singles sales this year are the second highest ever, after 1978.

== Bands formed ==
- See Musical groups established in 1984

== Bands disbanded ==
- See Musical groups disestablished in 1984

== Bands on hiatus ==
- Black Sabbath

== Bands reformed ==
- Deep Purple

== Albums released ==
=== January ===
Day	Album	Artist	Notes
9	1984	Van Halen	-
13	Learning to Crawl	The Pretenders	
16	She's Strange	Cameo	-
19	Oblivion	Utopia	-
20	Defenders of the Faith	Judas Priest	-
21	Disillusion	Loudness	-
23	Bon Jovi	Bon Jovi	Debut
27	Footloose soundtrack	Various Artists	Soundtrack
27	Milk and Honey	John Lennon & Yoko Ono	-
27	Moving	The Raincoats	-
27	Christine McVie	Christine McVie	US
30	Slide It In	Whitesnake	UK
30	Crusader	Saxon	-
30	Somebody's Watching Me	Rockwell	Debut
30	Software	Grace Slick	-
?	Fistful of Metal	Anthrax	Debut
?	Flex-Able	Steve Vai	Debut
?	Just a Little Love	Reba McEntire	-
?	Lady of the Stars	Donovan	-
?	Live Europe '83	Joan Baez	UK
?	Mother's Spiritual	Laura Nyro	-
?	Roll On	Alabama	-
?	All the Rage	General Public	Debut
?	Tour de Force	38 Special	-

=== February ===
Day	Album	Artist	Notes
1	Let the Music Play	Shannon	Debut
6	The Flat Earth	Thomas Dolby	-
6	Ricochet Days	Modern English	-
6	Sparkle in the Rain	Simple Minds	-
13	It's My Life	Talk Talk	-
13	Love at First Sting	Scorpions	-
13	Declaration	The Alarm	Debut
14	Mister Heartbreak	Laurie Anderson	-
17	Out of the Cellar	Ratt	Debut
17	Great White	Great White	Debut
17	Parting Should Be Painless	Roger Daltrey	-
17	Budapest Live	Manfred Mann's Earth Band	Live
17	Into the Gap	Thompson Twins	-
20	The Smiths	The Smiths	Debut
20	Keep Moving	Madness	-
21	Rhyme & Reason	Missing Persons	-
23	Michael W. Smith 2	Michael W. Smith	-
24	N.E.W.S.	Golden Earring	-
24	Wings of Tomorrow	Europe	-
24	Metal Queen	Lee Aaron	-
27	The Works	Queen	-
27	Dead Can Dance	Dead Can Dance	-
27	Human Racing	Nik Kershaw	Debut
28	"Weird Al" Yankovic in 3-D	"Weird Al" Yankovic	-
?	Ammonia Avenue	The Alan Parsons Project	-
?	Points on the Curve	Wang Chung	-
?	Penetrator	Ted Nugent	-
?	Hail to England	Manowar	-
?	Animal Grace	April Wine	-
?	The Great Pretender	Dolly Parton	-
?	Live at the Grand Opera House Belfast	Van Morrison	Live
?	Mystery Walk	M + M	-
?	The Splendour of Fear	Felt	-
?	Toyah! Toyah! Toyah!	Toyah	Compilation
?	Violence & Force	Exciter	-

=== March ===
Day	Album	Artist	Notes
2	This Is Spinal Tap	Spinal Tap	soundtrack
5	About Face	David Gilmour	-
5	Rising Force	Yngwie Malmsteen	-
9	Human's Lib	Howard Jones	-
9	Stoneage Romeos	Hoodoo Gurus	-
12	Fugazi	Marillion	-
12	Love Life	Berlin	-
12	Heartbeat City	The Cars	-
14	Body and Soul	Joe Jackson	-
16	Alchemy: Dire Straits Live	Dire Straits	Live
16	Café Bleu	The Style Council	-
19	Talk Show	The Go-Go's	-
21	The Swing	INXS	Australia
22	The Dungeons Are Calling	Savatage	EP
23	Three of a Perfect Pair	King Crimson	-
23	The Icicle Works	The Icicle Works	Debut
27	Run-D.M.C.	Run-DMC	-
?	Against All Odds soundtrack	Various Artists	Soundtrack
?	All Those Wasted Years	Hanoi Rocks	Live
?	Blueprints for a Blackout	The Ex	-
?	Burning the Witches	Warlock	-
?	Climate of Hunter	Scott Walker	-
?	Deià...Vu	Kevin Ayers	-
?	Meltdown (Steve Taylor album)	Steve Taylor	-
?	Minor Threat	Minor Threat	Compilation
?	My War	Black Flag	-
?	Psalm 9	Trouble	-
?	Swoon	Prefab Sprout	Debut
?	Texas Fever	Orange Juice	-

=== April ===
Day	Album	Artist	Notes
2	Caught in the Act	Styx	Live
2	Keep Your Hands Off My Power Supply	Slade	-
4	Vengeance	New Model Army	-
5	Street Talk	Steve Perry	Solo Debut
6	Lament	Ultravox	-
9	Reckoning	R.E.M.	-
12	Grace Under Pressure	Rush	-
16	Bananarama	Bananarama	-
25	Variety	Mariya Takeuchi	-
30	Junk Culture	Orchestral Manoeuvres in the Dark	-
30	The Pros and Cons of Hitch Hiking	Roger Waters	Solo Debut
30	The Top	The Cure	-
30	New Sensations	Lou Reed	-
?	99 Luftballons	Nena	-
?	At War with Satan	Venom	-
?	Eye for an Eye	Corrosion of Conformity	-
?	History, Mystery & Prophesy	Lee "Scratch" Perry	-
?	Jermaine Jackson	Jermaine Jackson	-
?	Legend	Clannad	Soundtrack
?	Self Control	Laura Branigan	-

=== May ===
Day	Album	Artist	Notes
4	Jam on Revenge	Newcleus	Debut
4	Ocean Rain	Echo & the Bunnymen	-
6	Mirror Moves	The Psychedelic Furs	-
7	Hysteria	The Human League	-
7	Legend	Bob Marley and the Wailers	Compilation
8	Farewell My Summer Love	Michael Jackson	Compilation
10	Stay Hungry	Twisted Sister	-
14	Chicago 17	Chicago	-
14	Hallowed Ground	Violent Femmes	-
15	Couldn't Stand the Weather	Stevie Ray Vaughan	-
15	Vices	Kick Axe	-
23	All Over the Place	The Bangles	-
25	A Little Spice	Loose Ends	UK debut
25	Slades Greats	Slade	Compilation
29	Private Dancer	Tina Turner	-
29	A Pagan Place	The Waterboys	-
29	Fat Boys	The Fat Boys	-
30	Nuclear Furniture	Jefferson Starship	-
?	Live Sentence	Alcatrazz	Live
?	Civilized Man	Joe Cocker	-
?	The Box	The Box	-
?	Breaking Curfew	Red Rider	-
?	From the Promised Land	Play Dead	-
?	Give 'Em The Axe	Lizzy Borden	EP
?	In the Long Grass	The Boomtown Rats	-
?	Major Moves	Hank Williams, Jr.	-
?	Mange Tout	Blancmange	-
?	Man on the Line	Chris de Burgh	-
?	Nick Lowe and His Cowboy Outfit	Nick Lowe	-
?	Russ Ballard	Russ Ballard	-
?	Russians and Americans	Al Stewart	-
?	Stealing Fire	Bruce Cockburn	-
?	Ten Thousand Lightyears	Boney M.	-
?	Touch Dance	Eurythmics	Remix EP
?	Through the Fire	Hagar Schon Aaronson Shrieve (HSAS)	-

=== June ===
Day	Album	Artist	Notes
4	Born in the U.S.A.	Bruce Springsteen	-
4	The Glamorous Life	Sheila E.	-
4	Eden	Everything but the Girl	Debut
8	Hyæna	Siouxsie and the Banshees	-
8	Ghostbusters	Various artists	Soundtrack
15	No Brakes	John Waite	-
15	In the Studio	The Specials	-
18	Breaking Hearts	Elton John	-
18	Camouflage	Rod Stewart	-
18	From Her to Eternity	Nick Cave and the Bad Seeds	Debut
18	Goodbye Cruel World	Elvis Costello and the Attractions	-
19	The Allnighter	Glenn Frey	-
19	Who's Afraid of the Art of Noise?	Art of Noise	-
22	Mask	Roger Glover	-
25	Discovery	Mike Oldfield	-
25	Parade	Spandau Ballet	-
25	Purple Rain	Prince and The Revolution	Soundtrack
25	Brilliant Trees	David Sylvian	-
26	Sidewalk	Icehouse	-
28	Akimbo Alogo	Kim Mitchell	Debut
?	The Las Vegas Story	The Gun Club	-
?	Pulling Rabbits Out of a Hat	Sparks	-
?	Rock Will Never Die	Michael Schenker Group	Live
?	Rewind (1971–1984)	the Rolling Stones	Compilation

=== July ===
Day	Album	Artist	Notes
2	The Last in Line	Dio	-
2	Victory	The Jacksons	-
3	Zen Arcade	Hüsker Dü	-
6	New Edition	New Edition	-
6	This Is What You Want... This Is What You Get	Public Image Ltd	-
7	Icon	Icon	-
9	Ice Cream Castle	The Time	-
16	Diamond Life	Sade	UK
16	Primitive	Neil Diamond	-
21	The Yellow and Black Attack	Stryper	-
23	Hard to Hold	Rick Springfield	-
23	VOA	Sammy Hagar	-
27	Ride the Lightning	Metallica	-
27	Condition Critical	Quiet Riot	-
27	Projects in the Jungle	Pantera	-
30	Go Insane	Lindsey Buckingham	-
30	Right By You	Stephen Stills	-
?	All Fired Up	Fastway	-
?	City of New Orleans	Willie Nelson	-
?	Double Nickels on the Dime	Minutemen	-
?	Honour & Blood	Tank	-
?	In Rock We Trust	Y&T	-
?	King of the Dead	Cirith Ungol	-
?	Lights Out	Peter Wolf	Debut
?	Now That's What I Call Music 3	Various Artists	Compilation
?	Signs of Life	Billy Squier	-
?	Walkin' the Razor's Edge	Helix	-

=== August ===
Day	Album	Artist	Notes
4	Haunting the Chapel	Slayer	EP
10	The Red Hot Chili Peppers	Red Hot Chili Peppers	Debut
10	War and Pain	Voivod	-
17	W.A.S.P.	W.A.S.P.	Debut
20	Sound-System	Herbie Hancock	-
20	The Story of a Young Heart	A Flock of Seagulls	-
21	Warrior	Scandal	-
23	Boulez Conducts Zappa: The Perfect Stranger	Frank Zappa	-
25	Evolución	Menudo	-
27	Soda Stereo	Soda Stereo	-
28	The Woman in Red (soundtrack)	Various Artists	Soundtrack
31	Dreamtime	The Cult	Debut
?	Where the Beat Meets the Street	Bobby and the Midnites	-
?	The Best of Kansas	Kansas	Compilation
?	The Blitz	Krokus	-
?	L.A. Is My Lady	Frank Sinatra	-
?	Phantoms	The Fixx	-
?	Two Steps from the Move	Hanoi Rocks	-

=== September ===
Day	Album	Artist	Notes
3	Powerslave	Iron Maiden	-
3	Sentence of Death	Destruction	Debut/EP
7	Don't Break the Oath	Mercyful Fate	-
7	No Remorse	Motörhead	Compilation + 4 new tracks
7	The Warning	Queensrÿche	Debut
7	Under Wraps	Jethro Tull	-
11	Cats Without Claws	Donna Summer	-
12	Like This	The dB's	-
12	Suddenly	Billy Ocean	-
13	Animalize	Kiss	-
13	Swept Away	Diana Ross	-
17	Tooth and Nail	Dokken	-
17	Now Voyager	Barry Gibb	-
20	Live PCPPEP	Butthole Surfers	Live / EP
21	A Private Heaven	Sheena Easton	-
21	Perspective	America	-
24	Some Great Reward	Depeche Mode	-
24	Tonight	David Bowie	-
27	Forever Young	Alphaville	Debut
27	Sign In Please	Autograph	Debut
?	Stop Making Sense	Talking Heads	Soundtrack
?	Bachman–Turner Overdrive	Bachman–Turner Overdrive	-
?	Bewitched	Andy Summers & Robert Fripp	-
?	The Catch	Nazareth	-
?	Desert Moon	Dennis DeYoung	-
?	Don't Stop	Jeffrey Osborne	-
?	Dream Street	Janet Jackson	-
?	Eyes of Innocence	Miami Sound Machine	-
?	Family Man	Black Flag	-
?	How Men Are	Heaven 17	-
?	I Often Dream of Trains	Robyn Hitchcock	-
?	The Magazine	Rickie Lee Jones	-
?	Night on Bröcken	Fates Warning	-
?	No Tellin' Lies	Zebra	-
?	Reflections	Rick James	Compilation
?	Riddles in the Sand	Jimmy Buffett	-
?	Riff Raff	Dave Edmunds	-
?	Spring Hill Fair	The Go-Betweens	-
?	The Plan	Tubeway Army	-
?	Till We Have Faces	Steve Hackett	-
?	Vital Signs	Survivor	-
?	What About Me?	Kenny Rogers	-

=== October ===
Day	Album	Artist	Notes
1	The Unforgettable Fire	U2	-
1	I Feel for You	Chaka Khan	-
1	Apollonia 6	Apollonia 6	Debut
1	In the Eye of the Storm	Roger Hodgson	Solo debut
1	Too Tough to Die	the Ramones	-
1	We Want Moore!	Gary Moore	Live
1	Red Sails in the Sunset	Midnight Oil	-
1	Glorious Results of a Misspent Youth	Joan Jett and the Blackhearts	-
2	Knights of the New Thunder	TNT	-
2	Let It Be	The Replacements	-
5	True Colours	Level 42	-
5	You're Gettin' Even While I'm Gettin' Odd	The J. Geils Band	-
8	Shout	Devo	-
8	The Wonderful and Frightening World Of...	The Fall	-
8	It'll End in Tears	This Mortal Coil	-
9	Emotion	Barbra Streisand	-
9	March of the Saint	Armored Saint	-
12	Big Bam Boom	Hall & Oates	-
12	Rattlesnakes	Lloyd Cole and the Commotions	-
15	The Age of Consent	Bronski Beat	Debut
15	The Big Express	XTC	-
15	Sign of the Hammer	Manowar	-
15	Valotte	Julian Lennon	Debut
16	Geffery Morgan	UB40	-
17	Escape	Whodini	-
18	Isolation	Toto	Released in Europe on 5 November
18	'74 Jailbreak	AC/DC	EP recorded 1974–76
18	Chinese Wall	Philip Bailey	-
18	Them or Us	Frank Zappa	-
19	Steeltown	Big Country	-
22	Waking Up with the House on Fire	Culture Club	-
22	Give My Regards to Broad Street	Paul McCartney	Soundtrack
24	Hajimemashite	Miyuki Nakajima	-
26	The Strange Idols Pattern and Other Short Stories	Felt	
29	Perfect Strangers	Deep Purple	-
29	Welcome to the Pleasuredome	Frankie Goes to Hollywood	-
31	Wheels Are Turnin'	REO Speedwagon	-
?	At the Feet of the Moon	The Parachute Club	-
?	Bathory	Bathory	Debut
?	Gates to Purgatory	Running Wild	Debut
?	Girls with Guns	Tommy Shaw	-
?	Heavy Metal Breakdown	Grave Digger	Debut
?	How Will the Wolf Survive?	Los Lobos	Debut
?	Italian X Rays	Steve Miller Band	-
?	Music from Songwriter	Kris Kristofferson & Willie Nelson	Soundtrack
?	Why Not Me	The Judds	-

=== November ===
Day	Album	Artist	Notes
1	Tropico	Pat Benatar	-
1	Treasure	Cocteau Twins	-
2	Bad Attitude	Meat Loaf	UK
5	Make It Big	Wham!	-
5	Reckless	Bryan Adams	-
5	Teases & Dares	Kim Wilde	-
5	Alf	Alison Moyet	-
5	Aural Sculpture	The Stranglers	-
9	Berserker	Gary Numan	-
11	Starchild	Teena Marie	-
12	Like a Virgin	Madonna	-
12	1984 (For the Love of Big Brother)	Eurythmics	Soundtrack
12	Arena	Duran Duran	Live
12	Hatful of Hollow	The Smiths	Compilation
12	The Honeydrippers: Volume One	Robert Plant	EP
12	Treasure	Cocteau Twins	-
15	2:00 AM Paradise Cafe	Barry Manilow	-
15	Emergency	Kool & the Gang	-
16	Zoolook	Jean-Michel Jarre	-
19	Building the Perfect Beast	Don Henley	-
19	Fried	Julian Cope	-
19	The Riddle	Nik Kershaw	-
19	The Rock Connection	Cliff Richard	-
19	Thunder Seven	Triumph	-
19	Word of Mouth	The Kinks	-
21	Francesco Zappa	Frank Zappa	-
22	See Ya 'Round	Split Enz	-
23	Animotion	Animotion	Debut
26	The Killing Fields	Mike Oldfield	Soundtrack
29	Real Live	Bob Dylan	Live
30	Black Cars	Gino Vannelli	-
30	Rough Cutt	Rough Cutt	-
?	Brewing Up with Billy Bragg	Billy Bragg	-
?	The Deed Is Done	Molly Hatchet	-
?	Guardian Angel	The Shadows	-
?	Hits 1	Various Artists	Compilation
?	Kalimba de Luna – 16 Happy Songs	Boney M.	Compilation
?	Lay Down the Law	Keel	-
?	Live at the Inferno	Raven	Live
?	Lush Life	Linda Ronstadt	-
?	The Method to Our Madness	The Lords of the New Church	-
?	Morbid Tales	Celtic Frost	-
?	Now That's What I Call Music 4	Various Artists	Compilation
?	The Orange Juice	Orange Juice	Final album
?	Planetary Invasion	Midnight Star	-
?	So-Lo	Danny Elfman	Debut
?	Something Heavy Going Down	Golden Earring	Live
?	This Is Hawkwind, Do Not Panic	Hawkwind	Live
?	Two Minute Warning	The Angels	-
?	Who's Last	The Who	Live

=== December ===
Day	Album	Artist	Notes
12	Deep Breakfast	Ray Lynch	-
12	Yemenite Songs	Ofra Haza	-
14	Agent Provocateur	Foreigner	-
21	Thing-Fish	Frank Zappa	-
?	Beverly Hills Cop	Various Artists	Soundtrack
?	Slip It In	Black Flag	-
?	Live '84	Black Flag	Live
?	Fantastic Boney M.	Boney M.	Compilation
?	Psychic... Powerless... Another Man's Sac	Butthole Surfers	Debut
?	Remission	Skinny Puppy	EP
?	A Sense of Wonder	Van Morrison	-
?	Various Positions	Leonard Cohen	

=== Release date unknown ===
- Acousticity – David Grisman
- Aimless Love – John Prine
- American Band-ages – Nash the Slash
- The Art of Defense – Nona Hendryx
- Back & Forth – Skinny Puppy
- Born in Captivity – Roy Harper
- Box of Frogs – Box of Frogs
- Cal – Mark Knopfler – Soundtrack
- Can't Wait All Night – Juice Newton
- Caribbean Sunset – John Cale
- Centipede – Rebbie Jackson
- Change Your Mind – Raf
- Cinema – Elaine Paige
- Cop – Swans
- Country Boy – Ricky Skaggs
- Dali – Dalida
- Dancin' on the Edge – Lita Ford
- Dancing with Danger – Leslie Phillips
- A Dancing Foot and a Praying Knee Don't Belong on the Same Leg – Scattered Order
- E2-E4 – Manuel Göttsching
- E.M.F – GG Allin
- EB 84 – The Everly Brothers
- Electric Eye – Prodigal
- Every Man Has a Woman – Various Artists – Yoko Ono tribute
- Faith – H_{2}O
- Fans – Malcolm McLaren
- Flex-Able – Steve Vai
- Folk of the 80s (Part III) – Men Without Hats
- Ghostbusters Soundtrack – Various Artists
- Gone Fishin' – Flipper
- The Grapes of Wrath – The Grapes of Wrath
- Greatest Hits – Juice Newton
- Greatest Love Classics – Andy Williams
- Gum Tree Canoe – John Hartford
- Heart Don't Lie – La Toya Jackson
- Heart over Mind – Anne Murray
- Heavy Heart – Carla Bley
- Hits Out of Hell – Meat Loaf
- Honeymoon Suite – Honeymoon Suite
- Horizen – Jade Warrior
- Hostage – Rez Band
- If the Price is Right – Bonnie Pointer
- Inside the Fire – Rita Coolidge
- Intellectuals Are the Shoeshine Boys of the Ruling Elite – Killdozer
- It's All in the Game – Merle Haggard
- John Parr – John Parr (debut)
- Let Go – John Fahey
- Live Bootleg – Rez Band
- Mast Nazren -Ecstatic Glances Live in London, 1984 – Ghulam Ali
- Meat Puppets II – Meat Puppets
- Medicine Show – The Dream Syndicate
- Meeting in the Ladies Room – Klymaxx
- Nave Maria – Tom Zé
- Neil's Heavy Concept Album – Nigel Planer
- No Brakes – John Waite
- No Kinda Dancer – Robert Earl Keen
- On Fyre – Lyres
- Optimystique – Yanni
- The Painted Word – Television Personalities
- Party Party – Black Lace
- Plain Dirt Fashion – Nitty Gritty Dirt Band
- The Politics of Time – Minutemen
- Pulling Rabbits Out of a Hat – Sparks
- Reflexiones – José José
- Read My Lips – Fee Waybill
- Rebel Souls - Aswad
- Remote Luxury – The Church
- Riders in the Sky, Live – Riders in the Sky
- Rita Mitsouko – Rita Mitsouko
- Scatology – Coil
- Schizophrenic Circus – Red Rockers
- Seasons – Dion DiMucci
- Sonic Death – Sonic Youth
- Songs from Our TV Shows – The Chipmunks – Soundtrack
- The Stockholm Concert, 1966 – Ella Fitzgerald and Duke Ellington
- Straight Ahead – Amy Grant
- These Things Happen – David Van Tieghem
- Tocsin – Xmal Deutschland
- Touch Sensitive – Bruce Foxton
- United States Live – Laurie Anderson – Live
- Velocity – The Vels
- Victim in Pain – Agnostic Front (debut)
- Vital Signs (White Heart album) – White Heart
- The Voice – Bobby McFerrin
- Youth Anthems for the New Order – Reagan Youth
- Walking in the Shadow of the Big Man – Guadalcanal Diary
- Walpurgis Night – Stormwitch
- We Hate You South African Bastards! – Microdisney
- When in Rome Do as The Vandals – The Vandals
- Windows and Walls – Dan Fogelberg
- Wired to the Moon – Chris Rea
- Wonderful World – Telex
- Work Resumed on the Tower – News from Babel
- World Shut Your Mouth – Julian Cope

== Biggest hit singles ==
The following songs achieved the highest chart positions in the charts of 1984.

#	Artist	Title	Year	Country	Chart entries
1	George Michael	Careless Whisper	1984	(United Kingdom)	UK 1 - Aug 1984 (21 weeks), US Billboard 1 - Dec 1984 (20 weeks), US BB 1 of 1985, US Radio 1 of 1985 (peak 1 12 weeks), Canada 1 - Dec 1984 (12 weeks), Holland 1 - Aug 1984 (14 weeks), Switzerland 1 - Sep 1984 (17 weeks), Poland 1 - Mar 1983 (44 weeks), Italy 1 for 3 weeks - Jan 1985, Eire 1 for 3 weeks - Aug 1984, Canada RPM 1 for 2 weeks - Jan 1985, Australia 1 for 4 weeks - Sep 1984, Springbok 1 - Nov 1984 (21 weeks), Top Song of 1985 of the Billboard 50th list, ASCAP song of 1984, ARC 2 of 1985 (peak 1 16 weeks), Sweden (alt) 2 - Sep 1984 (21 weeks), France 2 - Aug 1984 (3 weeks), Austria 2 - Nov 1984 (4 months), Norway 2 - Aug 1984 (16 weeks), Belgium 2 - Sep 1984 (12 weeks), Italy 2 of 1984, Canada 2 of 1985, US Platinum (certified by RIAA in May 1992), UK Platinum (certified by BPI in Sep 1984), Sweden 3 - Sep 1984 (13 weeks), Germany 3 - Sep 1984 (3 months), ODK Germany 3 - Sep 1984 (21 weeks) (8 weeks in top 10), South Africa 3 of 1985, Brazil 4 of 1985, Australia 4 of 1984, US CashBox 5 of 1985, France (SNEP) 7 - Dec 1984 (1 month), UK sales 8 of the 1980s (1,360 k in 1984), Switzerland 9 of 1984, Scrobulate 13 of soft rock, POP 20 of 1985, Europe 30 of the 1980s (1984), US Songs 2014-23 peak 33 - Jan 2017 (1 week), UK Songs 2013-23 peak 44 - Jan 2017 (2 weeks), nuTsie 94 of 1980s, France (InfoDisc) 112 of the 1980s (peak 2, 35 weeks, 585k sales estimated, 1984), OzNet 183, Germany 250 of the 1980s (peak 3 12 weeks), UKMIX 297, Acclaimed 2242 (1984), RYM 37 of 1984, Guardian Pop 67
2	Stevie Wonder	I Just Called to Say I Love You	1984	(United States)	UK 1 - Aug 1984 (39 weeks), US Billboard 1 - Aug 1984 (25 weeks), Canada 1 - Sep 1984 (16 weeks), Holland 1 - Aug 1984 (17 weeks), Sweden 1 - Sep 1984 (8 weeks), Sweden (alt) 1 - Aug 1984 (23 weeks), Austria 1 - Oct 1984 (5 months), Switzerland 1 - Sep 1984 (21 weeks), Norway 1 - Sep 1984 (17 weeks), Poland 1 - Jan 1984 (26 weeks), Belgium 1 - Sep 1984 (20 weeks), Italy 1 of 1984, Italy 1 for 8 weeks - Nov 1984, Germany 1 - Sep 1984 (4 months), ODK Germany 1 - Sep 1984 (24 weeks) (6 weeks at number 1) (13 weeks in top 10), Eire 1 for 5 weeks - Sep 1984, Canada RPM 1 for 3 weeks - Oct 1984, Canada 1 of 1984, New Zealand 1 for 8 weeks - Oct 1984, Australia 1 for 8 weeks - Oct 1984, Springbok 1 - Oct 1984 (25 weeks), Europe 1 for 14 weeks - Sep 1984, Germany 1 for 6 weeks - Sep 1984, Spain 1 for 2 weeks - Nov 1984, Oscar in 1984 (film 'The Woman In Red'), Golden Globe in 1984 (film 'The Woman in Red'), France (SNEP) 2 - Oct 1984 (3 months), UK Platinum (certified by BPI in Sep 1984), Brazil 3 of 1984, UK sales 3 of the 1980s (1,780 k in 1984), US Gold (certified by RIAA in Nov 1984), Germany Gold (certified by BMieV in 1984), Australia 6 of 1984, US Radio 8 of 1984 (peak 1 12 weeks), US CashBox 9 of 1984, Switzerland 11 of 1984, ARC 12 of 1984 (peak 1 15 weeks), US BB 25 of 1984, POP 26 of 1984, France (InfoDisc) 30 of the 1980s (peak 1, 31 weeks, 926k sales estimated, 1984), Germany 52 of the 1980s (peak 1 15 weeks), UKMIX 63, Scrobulate 100 of r & b, NY Daily Love list 4
3	Prince	When Doves Cry	1984	(United States)	US Billboard 1 - Jun 1984 (21 weeks), US BB 1 of 1984, US CashBox 1 of 1984, ARC 1 of 1984 (peak 1 16 weeks), US Radio 1 of 1984 (peak 1 14 weeks), Canada 1 - Jun 1984 (15 weeks), Canada RPM 1 for 3 weeks - Jul 1984, Australia 1 for 1 week - Aug 1984, Top Song of 1984 of the Billboard 50th list, Golden Globe in 1984 (film 'Purple Rain') (Nominated), US Platinum (certified by RIAA in Aug 1984), nuTsie 3 of 1980s, UK 4 - Jun 1984 (15 weeks), Holland 5 - Jul 1984 (12 weeks), Belgium 6 - Aug 1984 (9 weeks), Springbok 6 - Sep 1984 (12 weeks), US Songs 2014-23 peak 8 - May 2016 (2 weeks), Sweden 9 - Sep 1984 (3 weeks), Scrobulate 9 of funk, Norway 10 - Sep 1984 (1 week), Canada 10 of 1984, Poland 14 - Jul 1984 (10 weeks), Australia 14 of 1984, ODK Germany 16 - Aug 1984 (19 weeks), Switzerland 17 - Aug 1984 (9 weeks), Sweden (alt) 18 - Aug 1984 (2 weeks), Austria 19 - Oct 1984 (1 month), Germany 22 - Aug 1984 (2 months), UK Songs 2013-23 peak 26 - May 2016 (1 week), Holland free40 27 of 1984, KROQ 39 of 1984, Acclaimed 40 (1984), Brazil 44 of 1984, Rolling Stone 52, POP 57 of 1984, 59 in 2FM list, Vinyl Surrender 69 (1984), DMDB 81 (1984), Europe 98 of the 1980s (1984), OzNet 206, Belgium 259 of all time, WXPN 564, UK Silver (certified by BPI in Aug 1984), RYM 1 of 1984, Guardian Pop 65, one of the Rock and Roll Hall of Fame 500
4	Band Aid	Do They Know It's Christmas?	1984	(United Kingdom)	UK 1 - Dec 1984 (49 weeks), Canada 1 - Dec 1984 (8 weeks), Holland 1 - Dec 1984 (9 weeks), Sweden (alt) 1 - Dec 1984 (19 weeks), Austria 1 - Jan 1985 (2 months), Switzerland 1 - Dec 1984 (14 weeks), Norway 1 - Jan 1985 (17 weeks), Belgium 1 - Dec 1984 (7 weeks), Italy 1 for 3 weeks - Jan 1985, ODK Germany 1 - Dec 1984 (36 weeks) (2 weeks at number 1) (8 weeks in top 10), Eire 1 for 5 weeks - Dec 1984, Canada RPM 1 for 2 weeks - Dec 1984, New Zealand 1 for 4 weeks - Jan 1985, Australia 1 for 4 weeks - Jan 1985, Europe 1 for 4 weeks - Jan 1985, Germany 1 for 2 weeks - Jan 1985, UK sales 1 of the 1980s (3,550 k in 1984), Germany 2 - Jan 1985 (3 months), UK Platinum (certified by BPI in Dec 1984), US Gold (certified by RIAA in Dec 1984), Scrobulate 6 of Christmas, Poland 8 - Dec 1984 (6 weeks), US Billboard 13 - Dec 1984 (8 weeks), Springbok 13 - Feb 1985 (5 weeks), Australia 19 of 1985, Italy 19 of 1985, Sweden 23 - Dec 2007 (4 weeks), KROQ 25 of 1984, Switzerland 29 of 1985, Canada 40 of 1985, Holland free40 50 of 1985, Japan (Tokyo) 62 - Dec 1988 (2 weeks), US CashBox 73 of 1985, Europe 78 of the 1980s (1984), US Radio 122 of 1985 (peak 13 4 weeks), UKMIX 183, OzNet 301, Germany 325 of the 1980s (peak 1 8 weeks), RYM 24 of 1984, Guardian Pop 68, Global 7 (10 M sold) - 1984
5	Tina Turner	What's Love Got to Do with It	1984	(United States)	US Billboard 1 - May 1984 (28 weeks), Canada 1 - Jul 1984 (13 weeks), Canada RPM 1 for 3 weeks - Aug 1984, Australia 1 for 1 week - Sep 1984, Grammy in 1984, Grammy Hall of Fame in 2012 (1984), US BB 2 of 1984, US CashBox 2 of 1984, ARC 2 of 1984 (peak 1 18 weeks), Springbok 2 - Sep 1984 (19 weeks), UK 3 - Jun 1984 (16 weeks), Canada 3 of 1984, Sweden (alt) 4 - Sep 1984 (12 weeks), Austria 4 - Nov 1984 (3 months), US Gold (certified by RIAA in Aug 1984), US Radio 5 of 1984 (peak 1 13 weeks), Sweden 5 - Sep 1984 (4 weeks), ODK Germany 7 - Aug 1984 (24 weeks) (5 weeks in top 10), France 8 - Aug 1984 (1 week), Switzerland 8 - Aug 1984 (17 weeks), Germany 8 - Aug 1984 (4 months), Norway 10 - Nov 1984 (1 week), nuTsie 11 of 1980s, France (SNEP) 14 - Nov 1984 (1 month), South Africa 14 of 1985, POP 14 of 1984, Holland 15 - Sep 1984 (7 weeks), Poland 20 - Aug 1984 (6 weeks), Australia 22 of 1984, Belgium 23 - Oct 1984 (2 weeks), UK Songs 2013-23 peak 35 - Jun 2023 (2 weeks), RIAA 38, Brazil 53 of 1984, Italy 100 of 1984, OzNet 221, Rolling Stone 309, Acclaimed 359 (1984), UK Silver (certified by BPI in Aug 1984), RYM 57 of 1984

== Top 40 Chart hit singles ==
Song title	Artist(s)	Release date(s)	US	UK	Highest chart position	Other Chart Performance(s)
"2 Minutes to Midnight"	Iron Maiden	August 1984	n/a	11	11 (United Kingdom)	10 (Ireland) – 70 (Germany)
"Aces High"	Iron Maiden	October 1984	n/a	20	20 (United Kingdom)	29 (Ireland)
"Agadoo"	Black Lace	May 1984	n/a	2	2 (United Kingdom)	3 (South Africa) – 5 (Ireland) – 9 (New Zealand) – 16 (Australia) – 48 (France)
"Against All Odds (Take a Look at Me Now)"	Phil Collins	February 1984	1	2	(6 countries)	See chart performance entry
"All Cried Out"	Alison Moyet	September 1984	n/a	8	6 (New Zealand)	See chart performance entry
"All Join Hands"	Slade	November 1984	n/a	15	9 (Ireland)	19 (Sweden)
"All Through the Night"	Cyndi Lauper	September 1984	5	64	5 (United States)	4 (U.S. Billboard Hot Adult Contemporary) – 5 (Austria) – 5 (Chile) – 7 (Canada) – 16 (Switzerland) – 17 (Australia) – 19 (New Zealand) – 35 (Germany) – 38 (U.S. Billboard Mainstream Rock Chart)
"Automatic"	Pointer Sisters	January 1984	5	2	1 (Ireland)	See chart performance entry
"It's a Miracle"	Culture Club	March 1984	13	4	2 (Ireland)	5 (New Zealand) – 14 (Australia) – 15 (Belgium, Netherlands) – 16 (Canada) – 41 (Germany)
"Like to Get to Know You Well"	Howard Jones	August 1984	n/a	4	3 (Ireland)	8 (Sweden) – 56 (Germany)
"Original Sin"	INXS	January 1984	58	n/a	1 (Australia, France)	See chart performance entry 1983 overlap
"Out of Touch"	Hall & Oates	October 1984	1	48	1 (United States)	See chart performance entry

== Number One hit singles ==
Song title	Artist(s)	Release date(s)	Date reached number one	Weeks at number one	Country(s)
"Against All Odds (Take a Look at Me Now)"	Phil Collins	February 1984	April 1984	3 weeks	4 countries
"All Night Long (All Night)"	Lionel Richie	August 1983	November 1983	4 weeks	6 countries
"All of you"	Diana Ross and Julio Iglesias	June 1984	October 1984	2 weeks	1 country
"Automatic"	The Pointer Sisters	January 1984	May 1984	1 week	1 country
"Big in Japan"	Alphaville	January 1984	April 1984	3 weeks	3 countries
"Break My Stride"	Matthew Wilder	August 1983	February 1984	4 weeks	1 countries
"Caribbean Queen"	Billy Ocean	May 1984	November 1984	2 weeks	3 countries
"Careless Whisper"	George Michael	July 1984	August 1984	3 weeks	25 countries
"Come Back and Stay"	Paul Young	September 1983	November 1983	7 weeks	3 countries
"Dancing in the Dark"	Bruce Springsteen	May 1984	June 1984	5 weeks	2 countries
"Easy Lover"	Philip Bailey & Phil Collins	November 1984	March 1985	4 weeks	4 countries
"Footloose"	Kenny Loggins	January 1984	March 1984	3 weeks	5 countries
"Freedom"	Wham!	October 1984	October 1984	3 weeks	4 countries
"Ghostbusters"	Ray Parker Jr.	June 1984	August 1984	3 weeks	3 countries
"Girls Just Want to Have Fun"	Cyndi Lauper	September 1983	January 1984	10 weeks	8 countries
"Hello"	Lionel Richie	February 1984	March 1984	6 weeks	9 countries
"High Energy"	Evelyn Thomas	April 1984	August 1984	5 weeks	3 countries
"Hold Me Now"	Thompson Twins	November 1983		0 weeks	—
"I Just Called to Say I Love You"	Stevie Wonder	August 1984	September 1984	6 weeks	28 countries
"I Feel for You"	Chaka Khan	October 1984	November 1984	3 weeks	3 countries
"I Should Have Known Better"	Jim Diamond	October 1984	December 1984	1 week	1 country
"I Want to Break Free"	Queen	April 1984	April 1984	4 weeks	3 countries
"Infatuation"	Rod Stewart	May 1984		1 week	1 Country
"Jump"	Van Halen	December 1983	February 1984	5 weeks	2 countries
"Last Christmas"	Wham!	December 1984	January 2021	7 weeks	16 countries
"Let's Go Crazy"	Prince and the Revolution	July 1984	September 1984	2 weeks	2 countries
"Love Is a Battlefield"	Pat Benatar	September 1983	February 1984	5 weeks	2 countries
"Missing You"	John Waite	June 1984	September 1984	1 week	2 countries
"99 Luftballons" / "99 Red Balloons"	Nena	January 1983	March 1984	3 weeks	4 countries
"Owner of a Lonely Heart"	Yes	October 1983	January 1984	2 weeks	1 country
"One Night in Bangkok"	Murray Head	October 1984	November 1984	11 weeks	6 countries
"Original Sin"	INXS	December 1983	January 1984	2 weeks	3 countries
"Out of Touch"	Hall & Oates	October 1984	December 1984	2 weeks	1 country
"Purple Rain"	Prince and the Revolution	September 1984	October 1984	6 weeks	2 countries
"Pride (In the Name of Love)"	U2	September 1984	September 1984	1 week	1 country
"Pipes of Peace"	Paul McCartney	December 1983	January 1984	2 weeks	2 countries
"People Are People"	Depeche Mode	March 1984	April 1984	3 weeks	1 country
"p:Machinery"	Propaganda	July 1985	1986	1 week	1 country
"Radio Ga Ga"	Queen	January 1984	February 1984	10 weeks	19 countries
"Relax"	Frankie Goes to Hollywood	October 1983	January 1984	5 weeks	7 countries
"Rock Me Amadeus"	Falco	May 1985	June 1985	4 weeks	8 countries
"Self Control"	Laura Branigan	April 1984	June 1984	6 weeks	7 countries
"Say Say Say"	Paul McCartney & Michael Jackson	October 1983	December 1983	6 weeks	7 countries
"Sounds Like a Melody"	Alphaville	May 1984	October 1984	3 weeks	2 countries
"Such a Shame"	Talk Talk	March 1984	April 1984	5 weeks	2 countries
"The Reflex"	Duran Duran	April 1984	May 1984	5 weeks	4 countries
"To All the Girls I've Loved Before"	Julio Iglesias & Willie Nelson	February 1984	April 1984	4 weeks	4 countries
"Two Tribes"	Frankie Goes to Hollywood	May 1984	June 1984	9 weeks	5 countries
"The War Song"	Culture Club	September 1984	October 1984	1 week	1 country
"The Wild Boys"	Duran Duran	October 1984	November 1984	4 weeks	2 countries

=== Other Chart hit singles ===
- "Baby You're Dynamite"/"Ocean Deep" – Cliff Richard (released in 1983)
- "Back for More" – Ratt
- "Be My Number Two" – Joe Jackson
- "Better Be Good to Me" – Tina Turner
- "Big City Nights" – The Scorpions
- "Big In Japan" – Alphaville
- "The Body Electric" – Rush
- "Borderline" (1983) – Madonna
- "Born in the U.S.A." – Bruce Springsteen
- "Blue Jean" – David Bowie
- "Breakdance" – Irene Cara
- "Breakin'... There's No Stoppin' Us – Ollie & Jerry
- "Break My Stride" – Matthew Wilder
- "Careless Whisper" – Wham!
- "Caribbean Queen (No More Love on the Run)" – Billy Ocean
- "Catch My Fall – Billy Idol
- "Centipede" – Rebbie Jackson
- "Cherry Oh Baby" – UB40
- "Cool It Now" – New Edition
- "Cover Me" – Bruce Springsteen
- "Crazy" – Kenny Rogers
- "Cruel Summer" – Bananarama
- "Cry and Be Free" – Marilyn
- "Dance Hall Days" – Wang Chung
- "Dance Me Up" – Gary Glitter
- "Dancing in the Dark" – Bruce Springsteen
- "Dancing with Tears in My Eyes" – Ultravox
- "Desert Moon" – Dennis DeYoung
- "Distant Early Warning" – Rush
- "Doctor! Doctor!" – Thompson Twins
- "Don't Blame It on Love" – Shakatak
- "Don't Tell Me" – Blancmange
- "Down on the Street" – Shakatak
- "Dr. Beat" – Miami Sound Machine
- "Drive" – The Cars
- "Easy Lover" – Phillip Bailey duet with Phil Collins
- "Eat It" – "Weird Al" Yankovic
- "Eighties" – Killing Joke
- "Eye to Eye" – Jermaine Stewart
- "Eyes Without a Face" (1983) – Billy Idol
- "Fade to Black" – Metallica
- "Femme libérée" – Cookie Dingler
- "Flame Trees" – Cold Chisel
- "Flesh for Fantasy" (1983) – Billy Idol
- "Footloose" – Kenny Loggins
- "For Whom the Bell Tolls" – Metallica
- "Forest Fire" – Lloyd Cole and the Commotions
- "Forever Young" – Alphaville
- "Freedom" – Wham!
- "The Ghost in You" – The Psychedelic Furs
- "Ghostbusters" – Ray Parker Jr.
- "God Bless the USA" – Lee Greenwood
- "Had a Dream (Sleeping with the Enemy)" – Roger Hodgson
- "Half A Boy Half A Man" – Nick Lowe
- "Hammer to Fall" – Queen
- "Heart from the Start" – Classix Nouveaux
- "Heaven's on Fire" – Kiss
- "Hello" (1983) – Lionel Richie
- "Here Comes the Rain Again" – Eurythmics
- "High on Emotion" – Chris De Burgh
- "Highly Strung" – Spandau Ballet
- "The Heart of Rock and Roll" (1983) – Huey Lewis and the News
- "Heaven" – Bryan Adams (charted in 1985 in the U.S.)
- "Heaven (Must Be There)" – Eurogliders
- "Hold Me Now" – Thompson Twins
- "Hold on to Love" – Gary Moore
- "Hot Water" – Level 42
- "House of Salome" – Kim Wilde
- "Human Touch" – Rick Springfield (released in 1983)
- "I Feel for You" – Chaka Khan
- "I Just Called to Say I Love You" – Stevie Wonder
- "I Scare Myself" – Thomas Dolby
- "I Wanna Rock" – Twisted Sister
- "I Want a New Drug" (1983) – Huey Lewis and the News
- "I Want to Break Free" – Queen
- "I Want to Know What Love Is" – Foreigner
- "I Won't Let the Sun Go Down on Me" – Nik Kershaw
- "If This Is It" (1983) – Huey Lewis and the News
- "I'll Fly for You" – Spandau Ballet
- "I'll Wait" – Van Halen
- "Illegal Alien" (1983) – Genesis
- "In Jeopardy" – Roger Hodgson
- "In Neon" – Elton John
- "Infatuation" – Rod Stewart
- "An Innocent Man" (1983) – Billy Joel
- "Invisible" – Alison Moyet
- "It's a Hard Life" – Queen
- "It's My Life" – Talk Talk
- "Joanna" – Kool & the Gang
- "Jokerman" – Bob Dylan
- "Jump" – Van Halen
- "Jump (For My Love)" – The Pointer Sisters
- "Jungle Love" – The Time
- "Just Another Woman in Love" – Anne Murray
- "Kalimba De Luna" – Dalida
- "Karma Chameleon" – Culture Club
- "Keeping the Faith" (1983) – Billy Joel
- "The Killing Moon" – Echo & the Bunnymen
- "Leave a Tender Moment Alone" (1983) – Billy Joel
- "Legs" (1983) – ZZ Top
- "Let's Go Crazy" – Prince and the Revolution
- "Let's Hear It for the Boy" – Deniece Williams
- "Like a Virgin" – Madonna
- "Lights Out" – Peter Wolf
- "L'Innamorata" – Dalida
- "A Little Love" – Juice Newton
- "Locomotion" – Orchestral Manoeuvres in the Dark
- "The Longest Time" (1983) – Billy Joel
- "Love Somebody" – Rick Springfield
- "Lovergirl" – Teena Marie
- "The Lucky One" – Laura Branigan
- "Lucky Star" (1983) – Madonna
- "Madam Butterfly" – Malcolm McLaren
- "Magic" – The Cars
- "Master and Servant" – Depeche Mode
- "Message to My Girl" – Split Enz
- "Michael Caine" – Madness
- "Middle of the Road" – The Pretenders
- "Missing You" – John Waite
- "Missing You" – Diana Ross
- "Miss Me Blind"- Culture Club
- "Mistake No. 3" – Culture Club
- "The More You Live, the More You Love" – A Flock of Seagulls
- "Mr. Telephone Man" – New Edition
- "My Ever Changing Moods" – The Style Council
- "My Oh My" – Slade
- "The NeverEnding Story" – Limahl
- "New Moon on Monday" – Duran Duran
- "No Mercy" – The Stranglers
- "No More Lonely Nights" – Paul McCartney
- "Nobody Loves Me Like You Do" – Anne Murray and Dave Loggins
- "Obsession" – Animotion
- "Oh Sherrie" – Steve Perry
- "On a Night Like This" – The Shadows
- "One Love/People Get Ready" – Bob Marley and the Wailers
- "One Night in Bangkok" – Murray Head
- "Only When You Leave" – Spandau Ballet
- "Original Sin" – INXS
- "Out of Touch" – Hall & Oates
- "Panama" – Van Halen
- "Passengers" – Elton John
- "Pearl In The Shell" – Howard Jones
- "Pearly Dewdrops' Drops" – Cocteau Twins
- "Penny Lover" (1983) – Lionel Richie
- "People Are People" – Depeche Mode
- "Perfect Skin" – Lloyd Cole and the Commotions
- "Pour te dire je t'aime" – Dalida
- "The Power of Love" – Frankie Goes to Hollywood
- "Pretty in Pink" – The Psychedelic Furs
- "Pride (In the Name of Love)" – U2
- "Purple Rain" – Prince and the Revolution
- "Radio Ga Ga" – Queen
- "Rattlesnakes" – Lloyd Cole and the Commotions
- "Read 'Em and Weep" – Barry Manilow
- "Rebel Yell" (1983) – Billy Idol
- "Red Sector A" – Rush
- "The Reflex" – Duran Duran
- "Relax" – Frankie Goes to Hollywood
- "The Riddle" – Nik Kershaw
- "Robert De Niro's Waiting..." – Bananarama
- "Rock You Like a Hurricane" – The Scorpions
- "Round and Round" – Spandau Ballet
- "Round and Round" – Ratt
- "Run Runaway" – Slade
- "Runaway" – Bon Jovi
- "Run to You" – Bryan Adams
- "Running with the Night" (1983) – Lionel Richie
- "Sad Songs (Say So Much)" – Elton John
- "Saturday Night" – Cold Chisel
- "Say It Isn't So" (1983) - Daryl Hall & John Oates
- "The Second Time" – Kim Wilde
- "Self Control" – Laura Branigan
- "Seven Seas" – Echo & the Bunnymen
- "Sexcrime (Nineteen Eighty-Four)" – Eurythmics
- "She Bop" (1983) – Cyndi Lauper
- "She Was Hot" – the Rolling Stones
- "Shooting From the Heart" – Cliff Richard
- "Shout" – Tears for Fears
- "Shout to the Top" – The Style Council
- "Silver" – Echo & the Bunnymen
- "Sister Christian" – Night Ranger
- "Skin Deep" – Stranglers
- "Soul Kind of Feeling" – Dynamic Hepnotics
- "Smalltown Boy" – Bronski Beat
- "Smooth Operator" – Sade
- "So. Central Rain (I'm Sorry)" – R.E.M.
- "So Tired" – Ozzy Osbourne
- "Soleil" – Dalida
- "Somebody's Watching Me" – Rockwell featuring Michael Jackson
- "Some Guys Have All the Luck" – Rod Stewart
- "Sounds Like a Melody" – Alphaville
- "Special Girl" – America
- "Standing in the Shadow" – Whitesnake
- "State of the Nation" – Industry
- "Stranger in Town" – Toto
- "Strut" – Sheena Easton
- "Stuck on You" – Lionel Richie
- "Sugar Walls" – Sheena Easton
- "Summer of '69" – Bryan Adams
- "Sunglasses at Night" – Corey Hart
- "Take On Me" (1984 European version) – a-ha
- "Taking It All Too Hard" (1983) – Genesis
- "That's All" – Genesis (released in 1983)
- "That's Not the Way (It's S'posed to Be)" – Anne Murray
- "Thieves Like Us" – New Order
- "Thin Line Between Love and Hate" – The Pretenders
- "Thriller" (1982) – Michael Jackson
- "Ti Amo" – Laura Branigan
- "Time After Time" (1983) – Cyndi Lauper
- "Tinseltown in the Rain" – The Blue Nile
- "To All the Girls I've Loved Before" – Julio Iglesias and Willie Nelson
- "To France" – Mike Oldfield
- "Together in Electric Dreams" – Philip Oakey & Giorgio Moroder
- "Too Young to Fall in Love" (1983) – Mötley Crüe
- "Torture" – The Jacksons
- "The Touch" – Kim Wilde
- "TV Dinners" (1983) – ZZ Top
- "Twist of Fate" – Olivia Newton-John
- "Two Tribes" – Frankie Goes to Hollywood
- "Up on the Catwalk" – Simple Minds
- "Very Personal" – Ian Dury
- "Wake Me Up Before You Go-Go" – Wham!
- "Wanted Man" – Ratt
- "The War Song" – Culture Club
- "We Belong" – Pat Benatar
- "We Rock" – Dio
- "We're Not Gonna Take It" – Twisted Sister
- "What About Me?" – Kenny Rogers, Kim Carnes and James Ingram
- "What Difference Does It Make?" – The Smiths
- "What's Love Got to Do with It" – Tina Turner
- "When Am I Going to Make a Living" – Sade
- "When Doves Cry" – Prince
- "When Love Breaks Down" – Prefab Sprout
- When the Lady Smiles" – Golden Earring
- "Where the Rose Is Sown" – Big Country
- "Whisper to a Scream (Birds Fly)" – Icicle Works
- "White Lines (Don't Don't Do It)" – Grandmaster Flash and the Furious Five (released in 1983)
- "Who Wears These Shoes?" – Elton John
- "The Wild Boys" – Duran Duran
- "William, It Was Really Nothing" – The Smiths
- "Wood Beez" – Scritti Politti
- "Wouldn't It Be Good" – Nik Kershaw
- "You Don't Love Me" – Marilyn
- "You Might Think" – The Cars
- "You Spin Me Round (Like a Record)" – Dead or Alive
- "You Think You're a Man" – Divine
- "You Were Made for Me" – Irene Cara
- "You're the Best Thing" – The Style Council
- "Young at Heart" – The Bluebells
- "Your Love Is King" – Sade

== Notable singles ==
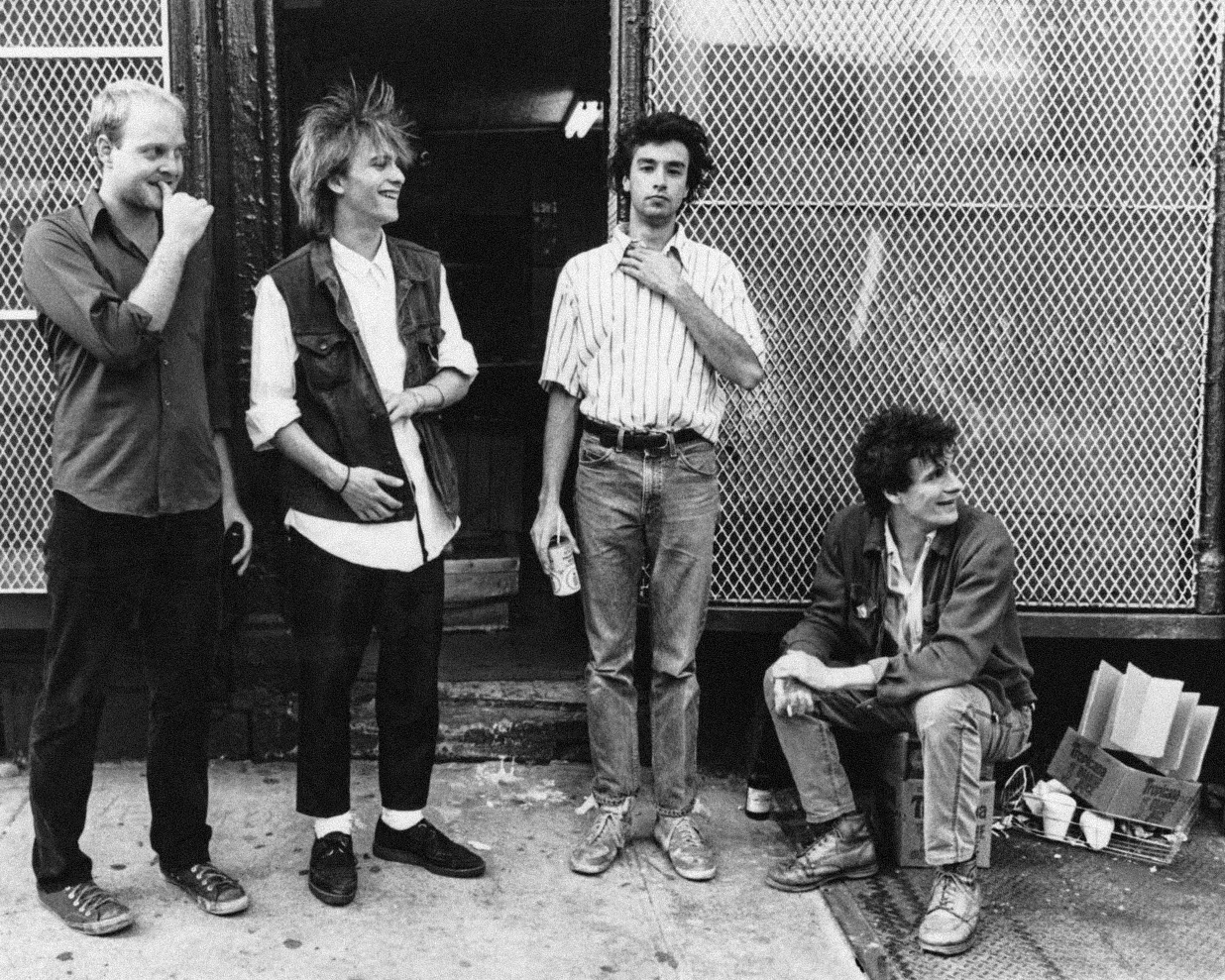
The Replacements in 1984

Song title	Artist(s)	Release date(s)	Other Chart Performance(s)
"A New Day"	Killing Joke	July 1984	56 (UK singles chart)
"Birds Fly (Whisper to a Scream)"	The Icicle Works	March 1984	2 (UK Indie Charts) – 13 (U.S. Billboard Hot Dance Club Charts) – 19 (Canada) – 37 (U.S. Billboard Hot 100) – 90 (UK singles chart)
"Blasphemous Rumours" b/w "Somebody"	Depeche Mode	June 1984	See chart performance entry
"Celebrated Summer"	Hüsker Dü	December 1984	n/a
"Dazzle" b/w "I Promise" / "Throw Them to the Lions"	Siouxsie and the Banshees	May 1984	33 (UK singles chart)
"Eighties"	Killing Joke	April 1984	60 (UK singles chart)
"Heaven Knows I'm Miserable Now" b/w "Suffer Little Children"	The Smiths	May 1984	10 (UK singles chart) – 11 (Irish Singles Chart)
"I Will Dare"	The Replacements	July 1984	n/a
"It's My Life" b/w "Does Caroline Know?"	Talk Talk	January 1984	See chart performance entry
"The Killing Moon" b/w "Do It Clean"	Echo & the Bunnymen	January 1984	7 (Irish Singles Chart) – 9 (UK singles chart) – 12 (New Zealand) – 96 (Australia)
"Message to My Girl"	Split Enz	January 1984	12 (Australia) – 13 (Netherlands [Dutch Top 40]) – 28 (New Zealand)
"Overground" b/w "Placebo Effect"	Siouxsie and the Banshees	November 1984	47 (UK singles chart)
"Pink Frost" b/w "Purple Girl"	The Chills	June 1984	17 (New Zealand)
"Seven Seas" b/w "All You Need Is Love"	Echo & the Bunnymen	July 1984	10 (Irish Singles Chart) – 16 (UK singles chart)
"Silver" b/w "Angels and Devils"	Echo & the Bunnymen	April 1984	14 (Irish Singles Chart) – 30 (UK singles chart)
"So. Central Rain (I'm Sorry)"	R.E.M.	May 1984	85 (U.S. Billboard Hot 100)
"Such a Shame" b/w "Again, a Game... Again"	Talk Talk	March 1984	See chart performance entry
"What Difference Does It Make?" b/w "These Things Take Time"	The Smiths	January 1984	12 (United Kingdom, Ireland)
"William, It Was Really Nothing" b/w "How Soon Is Now?" / "Please Please Please Let Me Get What I Want"	The Smiths	August 1984	83 (UK singles chart)

=== Other Notable singles ===
- "Doledrums" – The Chills
- "Dum Dum Girl" – Talk Talk
- "Part Company" – The Go-Betweens

== Christmas songs ==
- "Another Rock N' Roll Christmas" – Gary Glitter
- "Do They Know It's Christmas?" – Band Aid
- "Last Christmas" – Wham!
- "Thank God It's Christmas" – Queen
- "Another Lonely Christmas" – Prince

== Published popular music ==
- "After All These Years" w. Fred Ebb m. John Kander from the musical The Rink
- "The Cosby Show theme song" m. Stu Gardner and Bill Cosby
- "Cover Me" w.m. Bruce Springsteen
- "Every Time I Turn Around" w.m. Judy Hart Angelo & Gary Portnoy, theme from the TV series Punky Brewster
- "Friends" m. John Leffler, theme from the TV series Kate & Allie
- "Ghostbusters" w.m. Ray Parker Jr.
- "Hallelujah" w.m. Leonard Cohen
- "I Just Called to Say I Love You" w.m. Stevie Wonder
- "Let's Go Crazy" w.m. Prince and the Revolution
- "Like a Virgin" w.m. Billy Steinberg & Tom Kelly
- "Lights Out" w.m. Peter Wolf & Don Covay
- "Missing You" w.m. John Waite, Chaz Sanford & Mark Leonard
- "Murder, She Wrote theme song" m. John Addison
- "No More Lonely Nights" w.m. Paul McCartney
- "Rock You Like a Hurricane" w.m. Rudolf Schenker, Klaus Meine & Herman Rarebell
- "Time After Time" w.m. Cyndi Lauper & Rob Hyman
- "To All the Girls I've Loved Before" w. Hal David m. Albert Hammond
- "Wake Me Up Before You Go-Go" w.m. George Michael
- "What's Love Got To Do With It?" w.m. Terry Britten & Graham Lyle
- "When Doves Cry" w.m. Prince

== Classical music ==
- Samuel Adler – Sonata for viola and piano
- Elliott Carter
  - Canon for 4, Homage to William, for flute, bass clarinet, violin and cello
  - Esprit rude/esprit doux, for flute and clarinet
  - Riconoscenza per Goffredo Petrassi, for violin
- Brian Cherney – Into the Distant Stillness
- George Crumb
  - A Haunted Landscape for orchestra
  - The Sleeper for soprano and piano
- Mario Davidovsky – Divertimento for cello and orchestra
- Peter Maxwell Davies – Symphony No. 3
- Ludovico Einaudi – Altissimo
- Lorenzo Ferrero
  - My Blues
  - Ombres, for orchestra and live electronics
- Frans Geysen
  - A + B = A/B, for keyboard instrument
  - Kataloog in grijs 1, for marimba
  - Late spiegels, for flute, oboe, piano and double bass
  - Omtrent a-b-c, for recorder quintet
  - Tonen-Trappenhuisje voor Hanne, for keyboard instrument
  - Twee orgels, for two organs
- Karel Goeyvaerts
  - Aquarius-Tango, for piano
  - Zum Wassermann, for chamber orchestra (14 musicians)
  - De Zang van Aquarius, for 8 bass clarinets
- Daron Hagen – A Walt Whitman Requiem
- John Harbison – String Quartet no. 1
- Robin Holloway – Concerto for Viola
- Mauricio Kagel – Der Eid des Hippokrates, for piano 3 hands
- Wojciech Kilar – Angelus, cantata for soprano, mixed choir and symphony orchestra
- Ian McDougall – Concerto for Clarinet
- Elizabeth Maconchy – String Quartet no. 13, Quartetto Corto
- Ingram Marshall – Voces Resonae
- Henri Pousseur
  - Chronique canine, for 2 pianos
  - Cortège des belles ténébreuses au jardin boréal, for cor anglais, viola, horn, tuba and 2 percussionists
  - L'étoile des langues, for narrators and 4 singers
  - Litanie du cristal des fleurs, for piano left hand
  - Litanie du miel matinal, for high melody instrument
  - Les noces d'Icare et de Mnémosyne, for variable forces
  - Patchwork des tribus américaines, for wind orchestra
  - Sixième vue sur les jardins interdits, for string trio
  - Sonate des maîtres viennois ('Dicté par ... no.4'), for piano
  - Tango de Jeanne-la-Sibylle, for piano left hand
- Steve Reich – The Desert Music
- Wolfgang Rihm
  - Vorgefühle for orchestra
  - Schattenstück for orchestra
  - Fusées for orchestra
  - Blaubuch: String Quartet No. 6
- John Serry Sr. – Elegy for Organ
- Tōru Takemitsu – riverrun for piano and orchestra
- Robert Ward – Saxophone Concerto
- Malcolm Williamson
  - A Pilgrim Liturgy – for soloists, mixed choir & orchestra
  - Cortège for a Warrior for orchestra
  - Hymna Titu for piano solo
  - Symphony No. 7

== Ballet ==
See List of 1984 ballet premieres

== Opera ==
- Philip Glass
  - Akhnaten
  - the CIVIL warS (Rome section)
- Luigi Nono – Prometeo
- Krzysztof Penderecki – The Black Mask
- Peter Schickele – The Abduction of Figaro, attributed to P. D. Q. Bach.
- Karlheinz Stockhausen – Samstag aus Licht (produced by La Scala, Milan)

== Musical theater ==
- Starlight Express – Andrew Lloyd Webber and Richard Stilgoe – London production opened and ran for 7.409 performances
- Forty-Second Street – London production
- The Rink – Broadway production opened at the Martin Beck Theatre on February 9 and ran for 233 performances
- Sunday in the Park with George (Stephen Sondheim) – Broadway production opened at the Booth Theatre on May 2 and ran for 604 performances.

== Musical films ==
- Amadeus
- Asha Jyoti
- Beat Street
- Breakin'
- Breakin' 2: Electric Boogaloo
- Conexión Caribe
- The Cotton Club
- Footloose
- The Girl from Moonooloo, TV starring Jacki Weaver and David Atkins
- Give My Regards to Broad Street
- Hard to Hold
- The Muppets Take Manhattan
- Purple Rain
- Streets of Fire
- Sunny
- Then Sings My Soul
- This Is Spinal Tap

== Births ==
- January 2 – Jocelyn Oxlade, English-Filipino singer-songwriter and model (Kitty Girls)
- January 9 – Drew Brown, American pop rock musician (OneRepublic)
- January 17
  - Calvin Harris, Scottish electronic musician, DJ, producer (Dated and worked with: Taylor Swift, Rita Ora, Worked with:Dua Lipa)
  - Sharaya J, Hawaiian-born American female rapper and choreographer.
- January 18
  - Kristy Lee Cook, American Idol finalist
  - Benji Schwimmer, Winner of So You Think You Can Dance 2006
- January 20

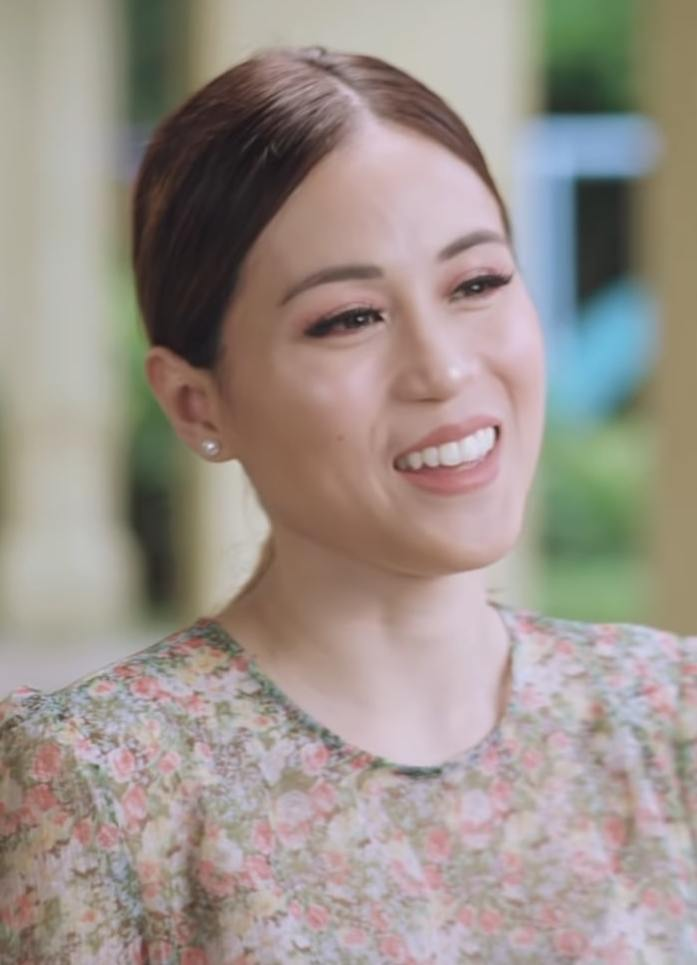
January 20: Toni Gonzaga

  - Toni Gonzaga, Filipina actress and singer
  - Bonnie McKee, American singer-songwriter
- January 24 – Witold Kiełtyka, Polish musician (d. 2007)
- January 26 – Wu Qian, pianist
- January 27 – Davetta Sherwood, American actress and singer
- January 29 – Diana Rouvas, Australian singer-songwriter and The Voice Australia contestant, later winner
- January 30 – Kid Cudi, American rapper

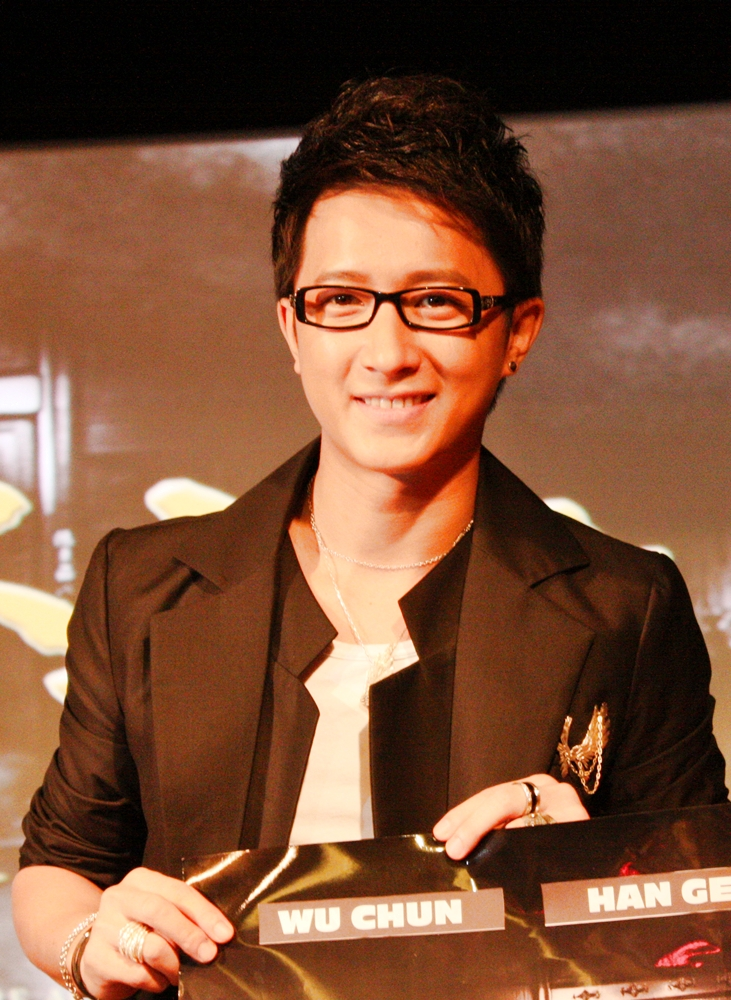
February 9: Han Geng

- February 9 – Han Geng, Chinese singer in Korea (Super Junior)
- February 11
  - Aubrey O'Day, American singer-songwriter, dancer and actress (Danity Kane, Dumblonde)
  - Anushka Manchanda, Indian singer (Viva)
- February 12 – Jamie Scott, English singer-songwriter
- February 14 – Víkingur Ólafsson, Icelandic pianist
- February 15 – Dorota Rabczewska, Polish singer and model
- February 18 – Lina, South Korean singer and actress (Isak N Jiyeon)
- February 18 – Daniel Cohen, Israeli conductor, music director and violinist
- February 19 – Chris Richardson, American singer
- February 20 – Audra Mae, American singer-songwriter
- February 23 – Grieves, American hip-hop artist
- February 24 – Brahim Attaeb, Belgian R&B singer
- February 25 – Lovefoxxx (Cansei de Ser Sexy)
- February 26 – Natalia Lafourcade, Mexican pop-rock singer and songwriter
- February 29
  - Kiyoe Yoshioka, Japanese singer (ikimono-gakari)
  - Mark Foster, American singer and guitarist (Foster The People)
- March 2 – Elizabeth Jagger, American activist, model and actress daughter of Mick Jagger and Bianca Jagger
- March 3 – Tim Maddren, New Zealand entertainer (Hi-5)
- March 4 – Jeremy Loops, South African singer, songwriter and record producer
- March 6 – Chris Tomson, American drummer (Vampire Weekend)
- March 9 – Priscilla Ahn, American singer, songwriter and multi-instrumentalist
- March 12 – Shreya Ghoshal, Indian singer
- March 18 – Vonzell Solomon, US singer
- March 20
  - Christy Carlson Romano, American actress and singer
  - Christian Daniel, Puerto Rican singer and songwriter
- March 24
  - Evan Felker, American singer-songwriter and guitarist
  - Sadako Pointer, American singer (The Pointer Sisters)
- March 25 – Katharine McPhee, American Idol finalist, American singer and actress
- March 26 – Stéphanie Lapointe, Canadian singer
- March 29 – Li Martins, Brazilian singer, songwriter and actress (Rouge)
- March 31 – Jack Antonoff, American musician, multi-instrumentalist, singer-songwriter and record producer
- April 3 – Chrissie Fit, American actress and singer
- April 5 – Shin Min-a, South Korean actress and model
- April 6 – Max Bemis, American musician (Say Anything)
- April 7 – Belly (rapper), Palestinian-Jordanian-Canadian rapper, singer, songwriter and record producer

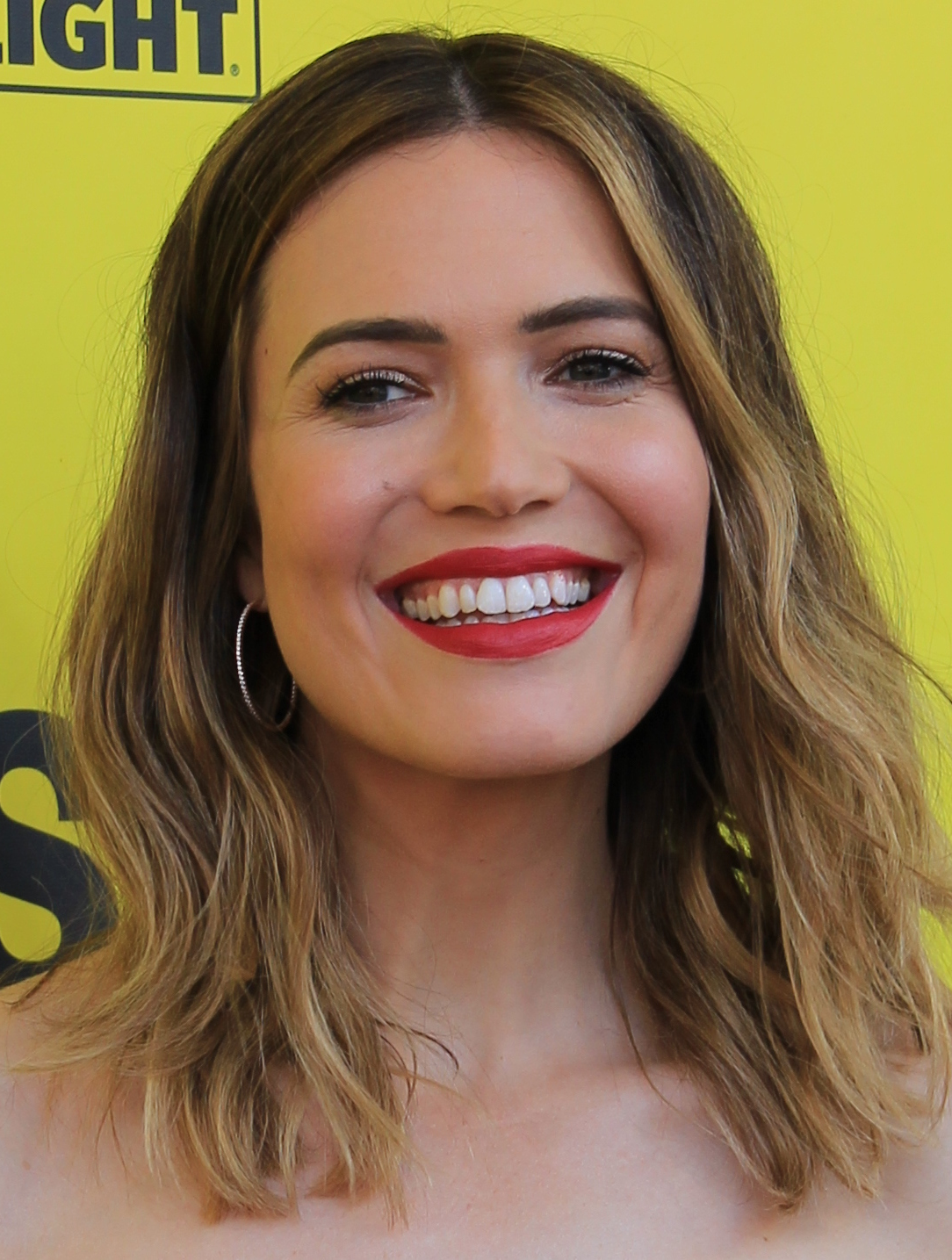
April 10: Mandy Moore

- April 8
  - Andrew Huang (musician), Canadian YouTube personality, musician, music producer, video producer and music teacher
  - Ezra Koenig, American singer/songwriter (Vampire Weekend)
- April 10 – Mandy Moore, American singer-songwriter, actress and musician
- April 11 – Junior Lima, Brazilian singer-songwriter, drummer, guitarist, actor and record producer (Sandy & Junior)
- April 14 – Adán Sánchez, American-Mexican musician (d. 2004)
- April 22 – Amelle Berrabah, British singer (Sugababes)
- April 23
  - Lil Eazy-E, American rapper
  - Isobel Waller-Bridge, British composer who is known for her scores for film, television, and theatre, along with her works for electronic music and contemporary classical music
- April 24 – Tyson Ritter American singer/songwriter of (The All-American Rejects)
- April 26 – Mija Martina, Bosnian singer and television host
- April 27 – Patrick Stump, American singer, songwriter and musician (Fall Out Boy)
- May 1 – Keiichiro Koyama, Japanese singer (NEWS) and actor
- May 2 – Rose Falcon, American singer-songwriter
- May 3 – Cheryl Burke, American dancer, model and TV host
- May 4 – Little Boots, British, singer, Musician, DJ, record producer, songwriter
- May 5
  - Wade MacNeil, Canadian guitarist
  - Jaime Brooks, Canadian-American songwriter and musician. (Elite Gymnastics, Grimes)
- May 10 – Pe'er Tasi, Israeli singer
- May 11 – Gerald Clayton, Dutch-American pianist and composer (The Clayton Brothers)
- May 14 – Olly Murs, English, singer-songwriter, television presenter and X Factor competitor
- May 14 – Verena Rehm, German DJ (Groove Coverage)
- May 15 – Mr Probz, Dutch singer, musician and actor (Robin Schulz)
- May 17 – Passenger, English singer-songwriter
- May 20 – Naturi Naughton, American singer, songwriter and actress (3LW)
- May 25
  - Marion Raven, Norwegian singer-songwriter (M2M)
- May 27 – Rachel Parris, British comedian, musician and singer
- May 29 – Ina Wroldsen, Norwegian singer-songwriter
- June 4 – Rainie Yang, Taiwanese singer
- June 11 – Zuzana Smatanová, Slovak pop-rock singer
- June 13 – Luke James (singer), American singer-songwriter and actor
- June 14 – Siobhán Donaghy, English singer (Sugababes)
- June 17 – John Gallagher, Jr., American actor, singer and dancer
- June 20 – Sherman Chung, Hong Kong singer
- June 23 – Duffy, Welsh singer-songwriter
- June 29 – Han Ji-hye, Korean actress/singer
- June 30 – Fantasia (singer), American singer
- July 1 – Jason Reeves (songwriter), American singer-songwriter and musician
- July 2 – Eugent Bushpepa, Albanian singer, songwriter
- July 4 – Gina Glocksen, American Idol finalist
- July 5
  - AJ Gil, American singer
- July 7 – Marie-Mai, Canadian singer
- July 9 – Jacob Hoggard, Canadian singer/lead singer of Hedley
- July 12
  - Gareth Gates, English singer
  - Jack Conte, American musician
- July 15 – Vice Cooler, American singer-songwriter (Hawnay Troof and XBXRX)
- July 17 – Asami Kimura, Japanese singer
- July 21 – Blake Lewis, American Idol runner- up
- July 24
  - Dhani Lennevald (A*Teens)
  - Tyler Kyte, Canadian actor/singer
- July 25 – Dong-Hyek Lim, pianist
- July 26
  - Alex Parks, English singer-songwriter
  - Kristina Dörfer, German singer (Nu Pagadi)
- July 30 – Gina Rodriguez, American actress, rapper, dancer, model, writer, producer and director.
- August 3
  - Carah Faye Charnow, American singer for the band Shiny Toy Guns
  - Whitney Duncan, American country music singer and songwriter, Survivor Contestant
  - Jon Foster, American actor
- August 5
  - Helene Fischer, Soviet-born German singer
  - Taylor Locke (Rooney)
- August 20 – Carminho, Portuguese fado and popular music singer
- August 21
  - Alizée, French singer, dancer and voice actress.
  - Melissa Schuman, singer (Dream)
- August 24 – Yesung, Korean singer (Super Junior)
- August 31 – Will Martin, New Zealand-born classical crossover singer
- September – Di Wu, Chinese-American pianist
- September 1
  - Joe Trohman, American musician
  - Ludwig Göransson, Swedish composer, conductor, songwriter, and record producer.
- September 3
  - Garrett Hedlund, American actor, model and singer
  - Lindsay Dracass, English singer
  - Seo In-young, South Korean dancer, singer, model, television host and actress (Jewelry)
- September 10 – How To Dress Well, Tom Krell, American singer-songwriter
- September 12 – Petra Marklund, Swedish singer, songwriter, and television presenter
- September 16
  - Sabrina Bryan, American actress and singer
  - Katie Melua, Georgian-British singer, songwriter and musician
- September 18
  - Jimmy Napes, English songwriter and record producer
  - Dizzee Rascal, British rapper and songwriter
- September 21
  - Gabriela Villalba, Ecuadorian singer and actress (Kiruba)
  - Wale, American rapper
- September 22 – Theresa Fu, Hong Kong singer and actress
- September 23 – Louie Stephens, American rock keyboardist (Rooney)
- September 26 – Keisha Buchanan, English singer-songwriter (Sugababes)
- September 27 – Avril Lavigne, Canadian rock singer-songwriter, voice actress and musician
- September 28
  - Melody Thornton, American singer-songwriter, dancer and television personality (The Pussycat Dolls)
  - Felix White, British musician, guitarist from The Maccabees, (Date(d)(ing)Florence Welch)
- September 29 – Karen delos Reyes, Filipino actress and comedian
- September 30 – T-Pain, American singer and rapper
- October 3 – Ashlee Simpson, American singer-songwriter, actress
- October 3 – Yoon Eun-hye, South Korean singer (Baby Vox)
- October 4 – Lena Katina, Russian singer (t.A.T.u.)
- October 5 – Naima Adedapo, American singer
- October 8 – Emily Williams, New Zealand singer, songwriter and actress
- October 10 – Stephanie Cheng, Cantopop Hong Kong singer
- October 12 – Matthew Dewey, Australian composer
- October 13 – Lumidee, American singer, songwriter and rapper
- October 15 – Jessie Ware, English singer and songwriter
- October 16 – Shayne Ward, English singer and winner of reality television show The X Factor
- October 20 – Balqees, Emirati singer
- October 25
  - Sara Lumholdt (A*Teens)
  - Katy Perry, American singer/songwriter, advocate
- October 26 – Amanda Overmyer, American singer
- October 27 – Kelly Osbourne, British singer
- October 29 – Chris Baio, American musician (Vampire Weekend)
- November 2 – Anastasia Karpova, Russian singer
- November 6 – Patina Miller, American actress and singer
- November 7 – Amelia Vega, Dominican actress, model, author and singer
- November 9
  - Delta Goodrem, Australian singer-songwriter, writer, musician, philanthropist and actress
  - Se7en, South Korean singer
  - French Montana, Moroccan-American rapper
- November 10 – Naoki Kobayashi, Japanese singer, dancer, actor, choreographer, and model (Sandaime J Soul Brothers)

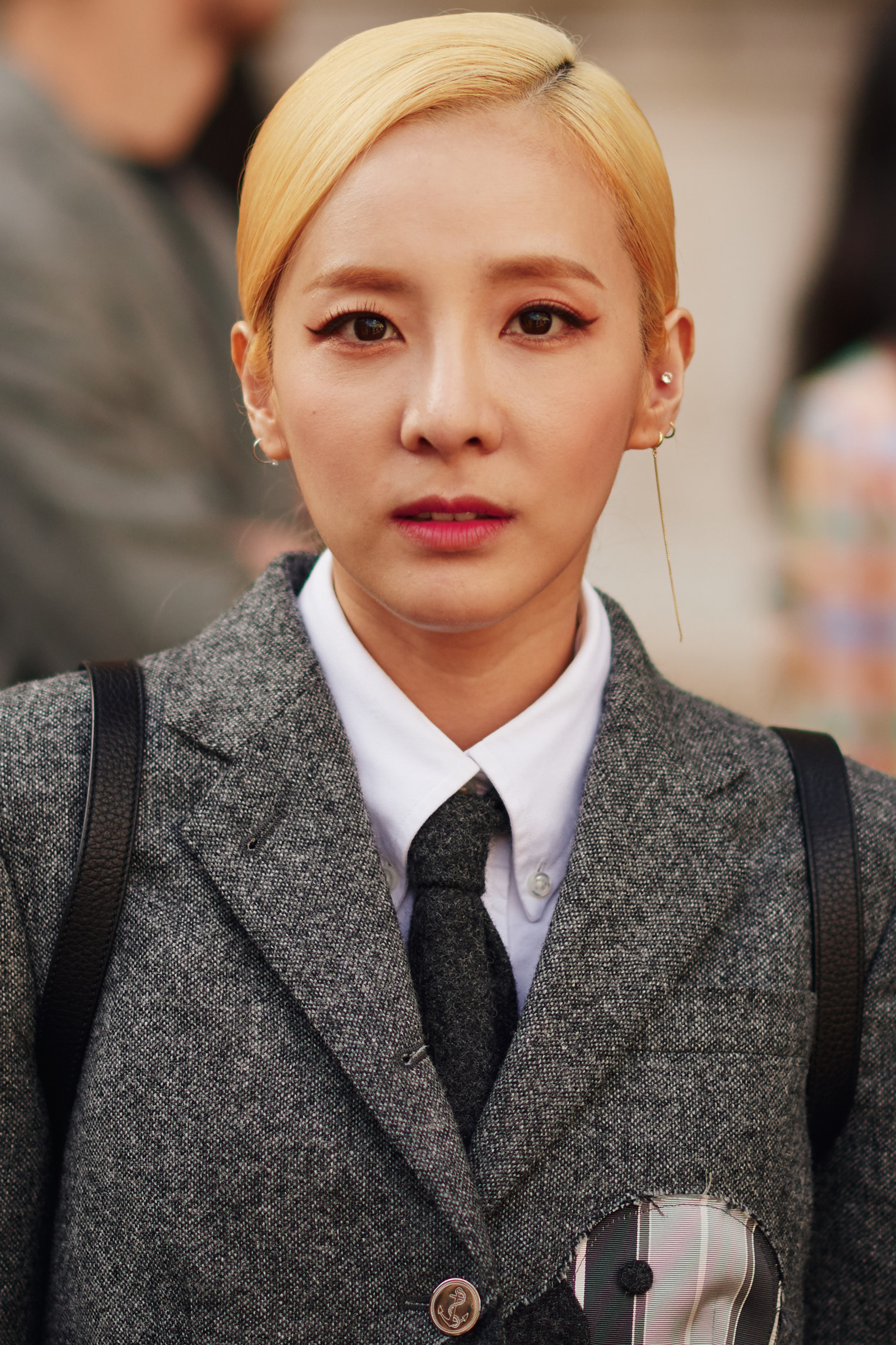
November 12: Sandara Park

- November 12
  - Sandara Park, member of South Korean girl group 2NE1, previously actress
  - Omarion, American. boy band (B2K)
- November 14 – Luiz Filipe Coelho, violinist
- November 14 – Marija Šerifović, Serbian singer
- November 18 – Johnny Christ, American heavy metal rock bassist (Avenged Sevenfold)
- November 21
  - Lindsey Haun, American actress and singer
  - Willy Mason, American singer-songwriter
- November 22 – Scarlett Johansson, American singer and actress
- November 25
  - Bo Bruce (Lady Catherine Anna Brudenell-Bruce), English singer-songwriter
  - Peter Siddle, Australian cricketer
  - Hồ Ngọc Hà, Vietnamese actress and singer
- November 27 – Sanna Nielsen, Swedish singer
- November 28 – Trey Songz, American singer
- November 29 – J. Holiday, American singer and rapper
- December 3 - Jelly Roll, an American rapper, singer, and songwriter
- December 12 – Gabrielle Ruiz, American actress, Broadway performer and musician (Crazy Ex-Girlfriend)
- December 15
  - Joshua Hayward, English rock guitarist (The Horrors)
  - Murda Mook, American rapper
- December 17
  - Asuka Fukuda, Japanese singer
  - Mikky Ekko, American singer
- December 18 – Julia Holter, American singer, songwriter, record producer, composer and artist
- December 20 – David Tavaré, Spanish singer

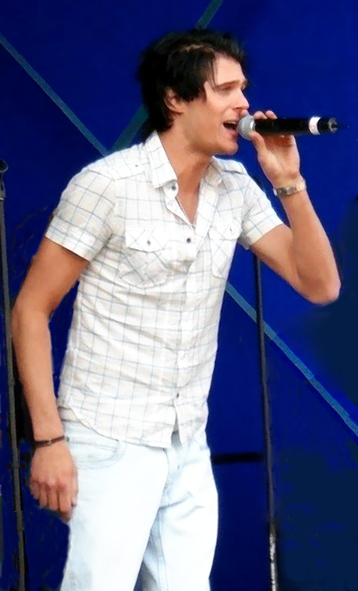
December 22: Jonas Altberg

- December 22 – Jonas Altberg, Swedish singer, record producer and DJ
- December 23 – Alison Sudol, American singer-songwriter, actress and writer
- December 24 – Jehnny Beth, a French musician, singer-songwriter, producer, presenter and actress (half of the duo John & Jehn and front woman of the English rock band Savages)
- December 25 – The Veronicas (Lisa and Jess Origliasso) Australian singer-songwriters, activists, musicians and advocates
- December 29 – Donisha Prendergast, Jamaican filmmaker, activist and actress
- December 30
  - Andra Day, American singer and songwriter
  - Dalia Stasevska, Ukrainian-born Finnish conductor

== Deaths ==
- January 1 – Alexis Korner, blues musician, 55 (lung cancer)
- January 18 – Vassilis Tsitsanis, Greek composer, 69
- January 21 – Jackie Wilson, singer, 49 (pneumonia)
- January 23 – Samuel Gardner, violinist and composer, 92
- January 30 – Luke Kelly, member of The Dubliners, 43 (brain tumour)
- February 1 – Ada "Bricktop" Smith, singer and dancer, 89
- February 15
  - Avon Long, American actor and singer, 73
  - Ethel Merman, singer and actress, 76
- March 9 – Imogen Holst, conductor and composer, 76
- April 1 – Marvin Gaye, singer/songwriter, 44 (gunshot)
- April 6
  - Jimmy Kennedy, Irish-born British songwriter, 81
  - Hryhory Kytasty, composer, 77
- April 20 – Mabel Mercer, cabaret singer, 84
- April 23 – Juan Tizol, trombonist and composer, 84
- April 26 – Count Basie, jazz musician, 79
- April 27 – Z.Z. Hill, blues singer, 48
- May 1 – Gordon Jenkins, US conductor, songwriter and pianist, 73
- May 29 – Sanford Gold, jazz pianist, 72
- June – Mohamed Mooge Liibaan, singer and instrumentalist
- June 8 – Gordon Jacob, composer, 88
- June 15 – Meredith Willson, US songwriter, 82
- June 28 – Mischa Spoliansky, Russian born composer and conductor
- July 4 – Jimmie Spheeris, American singer-songwriter, 34
- July 14
  - Bill Stapleton, jazz trumpeter, 49 (alcohol-related)
  - Philippé Wynne, R&B singer, 43
- July 19 – Madeleine Sibille, operatic soprano, 89
- July 25 – Big Mama Thornton, R&B singer, 57
- July 29 – Lorenz Fehenberger, operatic tenor, 71
- July 31 – Paul Le Flem, composer, 103
- August 4 – Babe Russin, saxophonist, 73
- August 5 – Tuts Washington, R&B pianist, 67
- August 12 – Margaret Sutherland, composer, 86
- August 30 – Emil Newman, conductor and composer, 73
- August 31 – Carlo Zecchi, pianist, music teacher and conductor, 81
- September 3
  - Dora Labbette, operatic soprano, 86
  - Arthur Schwartz, composer and film producer, 83
- September 6 – Ernest Tubb, country & western musician, 70
- September 10
  - Herman Sherman, jazz saxophonist and bandleader, 61
  - Trummy Young, swing trombonist, 72
- September 15 – Charles Lynch, Irish concert pianist, 77
- September 20 – Steve Goodman, singer/songwriter best known for "City of New Orleans", 36 (leukaemia)
- October 3
  - Lina Bruna Rasa, operatic soprano, 67
  - Harrison Potter, pianist, 93
- October 4 – Carl von Garaguly, violinist and conductor
- October 12 – Jesús María Sanromá, pianist, 81
- October 16 – Jiří Jelínek, jazz trumpeter, singer and artist, 62
- October 20 – Budd Johnson, jazz musician, 73
- October 26 – John Woods Duke, composer, 85
- November 8 – Carl Gustav Sparre Olsen, violinist and composer, 81
- November 16 – Leonard Rose, cellist, 66
- November 20 – Alexander Moyzes, Slovak composer, 78
- December 2 – Gabrielle Hunt, operatic contralto and voice teacher, 71
- December 7 – Jon B. Higgins, American Carnatic musician, 45 (road accident)
- December 9
  - Ivor Moreton, British pianist, singer and composer, 76
  - Razzle (Nicholas Dingley), drummer of Hanoi Rocks, 24 (car accident)
- December 10 – Charlie Teagarden, jazz trumpeter, 71
- December 13 – Max Schönherr, conductor and composer, 81
- December 15 – Jan Peerce, operatic tenor, 80
- December 21 – José Luis Rodríguez Vélez, Panamanian composer, orchestra director, saxophonist, clarinetist and guitarist, 69
- December 25 – Ron Tabak, lead singer of Prism, 31

== Awards ==
=== Grammy Awards ===
- Grammy Awards of 1984

=== Country Music Association Awards ===
- 1984 Country Music Association Awards

=== Eurovision Song Contest ===
- Eurovision Song Contest 1984

== Charts ==
=== List of no. 1 hits ===
- List of Billboard Hot 100 number ones of 1984
- List of Cashbox Top 100 number-one singles of 1984
- List of UK singles chart number ones of the 1980s
- List of Oricon number-one singles of 1984

=== List of no. 1 albums ===
- List of Billboard 200 number-one albums of 1984

== See also ==
- 1984 in heavy metal music
- 1984 in country music
- 1984 in British music
- Record labels established in 1984
- Timeline of musical events
- 1984
- Ronald Reagan in music
