= The Wrestler (soundtrack) =

The Wrestler (The Soundtrack from the Motion Picture)

Soundtrack album by various artists
- Released: January 27, 2009
- Length: 56:21
- Label: Koch

The Wrestler (The Soundtrack from the Motion Picture) is the soundtrack to the 2008 film The Wrestler directed by Darren Aronofsky, starring Mickey Rourke, Marisa Tomei, and Evan Rachel Wood. It was released on January 27, 2009, through Koch Records and featured pre-recorded songs in the rock and metal genre.

== Development ==
Unlike Aronofsky's previous ventures which had original scores by his recurring collaborator Clint Mansell, The Wrestler featured a soundtrack consisting of pre-recorded acts by rock and metal artists. The featuring artists were Ratt, FireHouse, Scorpions, Slaughter, Dead Family, Accept, Birdman, Lil Wayne and Cinderella amongst several others. However, the soundtrack released by Koch Records accompany 12 tracks used from the film and most songs were omitted, which includes the Guns N' Roses song "Sweet Child o' Mine" that played during Randy's entrance at the end of the film. Bruce Springsteen's original song written for the film "The Wrestler" was also not included in the soundtrack, albeit released as a single earlier.

== Track listing ==
The Wrestler (The Soundtrack from the Motion Picture) track listing
| No. | Title | Artist(s) | Length |
|---|---|---|---|
| 1. | "Metal Health" | Quiet Riot | 5:35 |
| 2. | "Don't Know What You Got (Till It's Gone)" | Cinderella | 5:54 |
| 3. | "Stuntin' Like My Daddy" | Birdman and Lil Wayne | 4:30 |
| 4. | "Don't Walk Away" | FireHouse | 4:34 |
| 5. | "Soundtrack to a War" | Rhino Bucket | 4:12 |
| 6. | "Blowin' Up" | Solomon Ray | 3:38 |
| 7. | "Mirror" | Dead Family | 4:45 |
| 8. | "Round and Round" | Ratt | 4:25 |
| 9. | "Dangerous" | Slaughter | 3:50 |
| 10. | "I'm Insane" | Ratt | 3:16 |
| 11. | "Balls to the Wall" | Accept | 5:45 |
| 12. | "Animal Magnetism" | Scorpions | 5:57 |
| Total length: | | | 56:21 |

== Original score ==
External audio
- The original score cue of The Wrestler featuring guitarist Slash

Clint Mansell's score in its entirety was not officially released to the public. Instead a promotional CD was released by Fox Searchlight Pictures as a part of their For Your Consideration campaign for the 2007–08 film awards season.

The only official release of Mansell's score was the theme song which featured contributions from guitarist Slash. It was released through Black Records on January 27, 2009.

The Wrestler original score track listing
| No. | Title | Length |
|---|---|---|
| 1. | "Gymnasium" | 0:27 |
| 2. | "Trailer Bedtime" | 1:19 |
| 3. | "Leaving Hospital" | 2:03 |
| 4. | "Jogging" | 0:24 |
| 5. | "Stephanie" | 1:06 |
| 6. | "Autograph Signing" | 0:41 |
| 7. | "Cassidy and Ram" | 0:58 |
| 8. | "Boardwalk Dance" | 1:33 |
| 9. | "Stephanie Argument" | 0:43 |
| 10. | "Eye of the Tiger" | 0:26 |
| 11. | "Pre-Match Build Ups" | 0:33 |
| 12. | "Glory Be" | 2:00 |
| Total length: | | 12:17 |
