= N.E.W.S. (Golden Earring album) =

Studio album by Golden Earring
- Released: 24 February 1984
- Genres: Hard rock, new wave
- Length: 36:27 (Vinyl); 41:13 (CD)
- Label: 21/Polygram (US) Mercury
- Producer: Shell Schellekens

Golden Earring chronology
Cut (1982)	N.E.W.S. (1984)	Something Heavy Going Down (1984)

Singles from N.E.W.S.
- 1. "When the Lady Smiles" Released: February 1984; 2. "Clear Night Moonlight" Released: April 1984; 3. "N.E.W.S." Released: June 1984

Professional ratings
Review scores
Source	Rating
AllMusic	3/5 stars
Kerrang!	(mixed)

N.E.W.S. (Also known as North East West South) is an album by Dutch hard rock band Golden Earring, released in 1984 (see 1984 in music).

== Track listing ==
All tracks are written by George Kooymans and Barry Hay, except "Mission Impossible" by Kooymans.

Side one
No.	Title	Length
1.	"Clear Night Moonlight"	3:25
2.	"When the Lady Smiles"	5:12
3.	"Enough Is Enough"	3:43
4.	"Fist in Glove"	3:27
Total length:		16:17

Side two
No.	Title	Length
1.	"Mission Impossible"	5:57
2.	"I'll Make It All Up to You"	5:22
3.	"N.E.W.S."	5:18
4.	"It's Over Now"	4:03
Total length:		20:55

=== CD edition track listing ===
No.	Title	Length
1.	"Clear Night Moonlight"	3:23
2.	"When the Lady Smiles"	5:39
3.	"Enough Is Enough"	3:42
4.	"Fist in Glove"	3:25
5.	"Orwell's Year"	4:20
6.	"N.E.W.S."	5:16
7.	"I'll Make It All up to You"	5:22
8.	"Mission Impossible"	5:58
9.	"It's Over Now"	4:08
Total length:		41:34

=== 40th Anniversary Remasters & Expanded reissue ===
CD1: Original album version remastered
No.	Title	Length
1.	"Clear Night Moonlight"	3:25
2.	"When the Lady Smiles"	5:41
3.	"Enough Is Enough"	3:45
4.	"Fist in Glove"	3:27
5.	"N.E.W.S."	5:18
6.	"I'll Make It All up to You"	5:23
7.	"Mission Impossible"	6:00
8.	"It's Over Now"	4:10

Bonus tracks
No.	Title	Length
9.	"Orwell's Year"	4:22
10.	"When the Lady Smiles" (7" single version)	5:07
11.	"N.E.W.S." (7" single version)	4:47
12.	"Mission Impossible" (7" single version)	4:32
13.	"Clear Night Moonlight" (12" single version)	4:44
14.	"When the Lady Smiles" (12" single version)	6:14
Total length:		67:00

CD2: The N.E.W.S. Sessions
No.	Title	Length
1.	"Enough Is Enough" (early version 5-83)	3:59
2.	"When the Lady Smiles" (early version 5-83)	4:02
3.	"Mission Impossible" (early version 5-83)	3:47
4.	"When the Lady Smiles" (early version 6-83)	8:01
5.	"Clear Night Moonlight" (early version 6-83)	5:55
6.	"Enough Is Enough" (early version 9-83)	4:56
7.	"When the Lady Smiles" (early version 8-83)	7:00
8.	"Mission Impossible" (early version 9-83)	7:48
9.	"Clear Night Moonlight" (early mix without horns 10-83)	3:38
10.	"I'll Make It All up to You" (instrumental rough mix 11-83)	5:40
11.	"It's All Over Now" (rough mix 12-83)	4:31
12.	"Orwell's Year" (rough mix 12-83)	4:51
13.	"Orwell's Year" (vocal overdubs 1-84)	1:35
14.	"When the Lady Smiles" (instrumental rough mix 10-83)	6:29
Total length:		65:48

== Personnel ==
Golden Earring

- Barry Hay – lead vocals, guitars
- George Kooymans – electric guitar, acoustic guitar, synthesizer guitar, lead vocals
- Rinus Gerritsen – bass guitar, keyboards
- Cesar Zuiderwijk – drums, percussion

Additional musician

- Cees Stolk – horn arrangements on "Clear Night Moonlight"

Production

- Producer – Shell Schellekens
- Engineer – John Kriek
- Digital mastering – Greg Calbi
- Horn arrangements – Cees Stolk
- Concept, design and artwork – Max Crace
- Photography – James N. McJunkin, Kees Tabak
- Wouter Bessels – production, compilation, research, coordination, remastering (2024 reissue)
- Wout de Kruif – tape transfers, alignments, and additional mixing (2024 reissue)
- Jeroen Ras – sleve notes, artwork inout, additional research (2024 reissue)

== Charts ==
Chart (1984)	Peak position
Canada Top Albums/CDs (RPM)	91
Dutch Albums (Album Top 100)	1
US Billboard 200	107

== Certifications ==
Region	Certification	Certified units/sales
Netherlands (NVPI)	Gold	50,000^{^}
^{^} Shipments figures based on certification alone.
