= Femme libérée =

Single by Cookie Dingler
- B-side: "Sexy Rock"
- Released: July 1, 1984
- Recorded: France, 1984
- Genre: Pop
- Length: 3:40
- Label: EMI Pathé Marconi
- Songwriters: Joëlle Kopf; Christian Dingler
- Producer: Bob Medhi

"Femme libérée" is a song recorded by French band Cookie Dingler. Written in 1984, it achieved a huge success in France and became a popular song throughout the years. It was the band's sole hit.

== Background and writing ==
Written in 1984 by Joelle Kopf and Christian Dingler under the label EMI Music, the song was a great success in the 1980s.

The song, released as a single on July 1, 1984, fell within the context of an era marked by the emergence of thoughtless songs which mocked some popular themes of society at the time. According to Elia Habib, an expert on French charts, the song reduced "freed women with a tender irony in an archetypal caricature" at a time when "the look is gaining importance and makes you 'in' or not".

== Charts performances and awards ==
In 1984, the song gained the price of the Union Nationale des Auteurs et Compositeurs awarded by the SACEM.

The single featured for 18 weeks on the French Singles Chart (Top 50), but this official chart began only on December 4, 1984, while the song was released five month earlier. It was #2 in the first edition of the chart, just behind Peter and Sloane's hit "Besoin de rien, envie de toi"; it stayed for two consecutive weeks at number 2. Then it dropped and totalled ten weeks in the top ten. In 1985, the single was certified Platinum disc by the SNEP.

== Cover versions ==
Finnish singer Leo Luoto covered the song in Finnish as "Lomapäivät" ("Holiday Days") on his 1985 eponymous album. In Finland Leo Luoto's version was very popular among conscripts.

Then was covered in 1998 by Mireille Mathieu, Alain Souchon and Julien Clerc for an album of Les Enfoirés.

In 2005, Soma Riba band featuring DJ Fou covered the song but did not manage to reach success: The single peaked at #33 on the French singles chart on July 4, 2005 and remained on the top 100 chart for 16 weeks.

== Track listings ==
7" single

A-side:

1. "Femme libérée" — 3:40

B side:

1. "Sexy Rock" — 2:47

== Certifications and sales ==
Region	Certification	Certified units/sales
France (SNEP)	Platinum	1,000,000^{*}
^{*} Sales figures based on certification alone.

== Charts ==
Chart (1984–1985)	Peak position
Eurochart Hot 100	24
French SNEP Singles Chart	2
