= Wanted Man (Ratt song) =

Single by Ratt

from the album Out of the Cellar
- B-side: "She Wants Money"
- Released: September 21, 1984 (US)
- Recorded: 1984
- Genre: Glam metal
- Length: 3:37
- Label: Atlantic
- Songwriters: Robbin Crosby, Stephen Pearcy, Joey Cristofanilli
- Producer: Beau Hill

Ratt singles chronology
| "Round and Round" (1984) | "Wanted Man" (1984) | "Lack of Communication" (1984) |

Music video
- "Wanted Man" on YouTube

"Wanted Man" is the first track on American heavy metal band Ratt's album Out of the Cellar. It was also featured on the soundtrack for the 1985 film Weird Science. The song was composed by Robbin Crosby, Stephen Pearcy, and Joey Cristofanilli (who was briefly filling in for full-time Ratt bassist Juan Croucier), and it was the second biggest hit on the album (note: "Back for More" did not qualify for a chart position since it was not an actual single release), reaching number 87 on the Billboard Hot 100 and 38 on the Billboard Mainstream Rock Tracks chart.

== Background ==
The song was written in an abandoned building guitarist Warren DeMartini and former bassist Joey Cristofanilli were squatting in on Sunset Strip in Los Angeles. The riff was Cristofanilli's idea. On the lyrics, singer Stephen Pearcy said, "Everybody wants to be a cowboy, right? That's the whole premise of that."

== Music video ==
The music video for the song is based on a wild west theme. In the video, the band members are a group of wanted men also known as "The Ratt Gang," the name being taken from a line in the song. The band members end up getting into a gun fight with another gang of cowboys who were also up to no good.

== Track listing ==
1. "Wanted Man" - 3:37
2. "She Wants Money" - 3:04

== Personnel ==
- Stephen Pearcy- Vocals
- Warren DeMartini- co-lead guitar
- Robbin Crosby- co-lead guitar
- Juan Croucier- Bass guitar
- Bobby Blotzer- Drums

== Charts ==
| Chart (1984) | Peak position |
|---|---|
| US Billboard Hot 100 | 87 |
| US Mainstream Rock (Billboard) | 38 |
