= Boothill Foottappers =

British musical group

- Origin: United Kingdom
- Genres: Pop
- Labels: Go! Discs

[nb duplicate Boothill Foot Tappers ] The Boothill Foottappers were a British male/female vocal/instrumental group, who had a single called "Get Your Feet Out Of My Shoes" in the UK Singles Chart. Released on the Go! Discs label, it entered the chart on 14 July 1984, and rose to a high of #64; it remained in the chart for three weeks.
