= Rebel Souls =

Studio album by Aswad
- Released: 1984
- Genre: Reggae
- Label: Island
- Producer: Aswad, Michael "Reuben" Campbell

Aswad chronology
Live and Direct (1983)	Rebel Souls (1984)	Jah Shaka Meets Aswad in Addis Ababa Studio (1985)

Rebel Souls is an album by the British band Aswad, released in 1984. They supported the album with UK and North American tours. Rebel Souls peaked at No. 48 on the UK Albums Chart.

== Production ==
Rebel Souls was recorded in Jamaica. The band's cover of Marvin Gaye's "Mercy, Mercy Me (The Ecology)" includes backing vocals by the London Community Gospel Choir. "54–46 (Was My Number)" is a cover of the Toots and the Maytals song. "Need Your Love (Each and Every Day)" is performed in a lovers rock style. "Rainfall, Sunshine" is about the exploited working class.

== Critical reception ==
Professional ratings
Review scores
Source	Rating
AllMusic	4.5/5 stars
The Baltimore Sun	5/5 stars
The Encyclopedia of Popular Music	3/5 stars
MusicHound Rock: The Essential Album Guide	3.5/5 stars
Rolling Stone	4/5 stars

The Los Angeles Times opined that the album "offers well-crafted reggae with a pop slant, but it pales beside the powerful 1983 concert captured on Live and Direct." The Wycombe Midweek noted that "when the rhythms gel and the horns punch, there is a sparkle that even West Indies-based artists find hard to touch." The Birmingham Post & Mail called Rebel Souls "less strident and more soulful than recent albums."

The Baltimore Sun concluded that the album "manages to combine the easy melodicism of Jamaican pop with the down-to-business intensity of the best of Black Uhuru." LA Weekly labeled it "another crucial mix of hard rhythms, spaced by the blistering horns of the most requested brass section in London." The Daily Telegraph listed it among the 10 best "rock" albums of 1984.

== Track listing ==
No.	Title	Length
1.	"In My Father's House"
2.	"Rebel"
3.	"54–46 (Was My Number)"
4.	"Just a Little Herb"
5.	"Rainfall, Sunshine"
6.	"Mercy, Mercy Me (The Ecology)"
7.	"You Can't Show Me"
8.	"Gave You My Love"
9.	"I Asked a Question"
10.	"Need Your Love (Each and Every Day)"
11.	"Chasing for the Breeze"
