= Round and Round (Ratt song) =

1984 single by Ratt

- Artwork for US vinyl single, also used for German release with different titling layout

Single by Ratt

from the album Out of the Cellar
- B-side: "The Morning After"
- Released: February 1984
- Recorded: 1983
- Genre: Glam metal
- Length: 4:26
- Label: Atlantic
- Songwriters: Robbin Crosby; Stephen Pearcy; Warren DeMartini
- Producer: Beau Hill

Ratt singles chronology
"You Think You're Tough" (1983)	"Round and Round" (1984)	"Wanted Man" (1984)

Music video
- "Round and Round" on YouTube

"Round and Round" is a song by American heavy metal band Ratt from their 1984 album Out of the Cellar. It was released as a single in 1984 on Atlantic Records.

In 2015, "Sleazegrinder" of Louder included the song in his list of "The 20 Greatest Hair Metal Anthems Of All Time", placing it at number six.

== Musical style ==
The song's style has been widely described as glam metal.

== Background ==
Ratt used to write songs in their Sunset Strip apartment by having both guitarists record riffs and melodies on cassettes, and then "bouncing" them back and forth, interspersing the riffs. Singer Stephen Pearcy said, "The lyrical content of 'Round And Round' is pretty much just stating our claim: 'Out on the streets, it's where we'll meet.' It's about the group, getting ready to do our thing. This is what we do."

The original version of the song, which the band performed live frequently in 1983, did not have the "you put an arrow through my heart" bridge. The bridge was a suggestion of producer Beau Hill.

== Music video ==
In the song's music video, Milton Berle (uncle of Ratt manager Marshall Berle) plays both the staid head-of-household as well as the family matron (echoing his famous cross-dressing stunts of the 1950s). Both characters seem perturbed by the loud volume of Ratt's playing, and they quickly leave the table.

Meanwhile, a seemingly shy yet attractive young woman (played by Lisa Dean, who would later turn up in the video for Michael Jackson's "Dirty Diana") is drawn by the music to the attic. On the way upstairs to the attic, her dress and wig fall off, and she gives herself a makeover. The woman appears in the attic as a completely different person, and begins dancing to the song.

At the end of the video, the butler is dressed as a metalhead and excitedly dancing to the music in a separate room.

The song's video was placed on New York Times list of the 15 Essential Hair-Metal Videos.

== Reception ==
"Round and Round" is Ratt's biggest hit single, having reached No. 12 on the Billboard Hot 100 in 1984. The tune was ranked number 51 on VH1: 100 Greatest Songs of the '80s and was named the 61st best hard rock song of all time also by VH1. In March 2023, Rolling Stone ranked "Round and Round" at number 20 on their "100 Greatest Heavy Metal Songs of All Time" list.

== In popular culture ==
"Round and Round" was used in season 1 of the series Supernatural, season 2 of the Netflix series Stranger Things, and the closing credits of the Grim Adventures of Billy & Mandy holiday special "Billy and Mandy Save Christmas".

In a 2020 TV commercial for GEICO, a young couple explains their new home has a Ratt problem—not a rat problem, as would be a much more likely complaint for homeowners. The band is seen singing "Round and Round" in various parts of the house. Following the GEICO commercial's release, the song charted again, reaching #18 on the Billboard Rock Digital Song Sales Chart on June 4, 2020.

== Track listing ==
1. "Round and Round" – 4:22
2. "The Morning After" – 3:33

== Personnel ==
=== RATT ===
- Stephen Pearcy – vocals
- Warren DeMartini – guitar
- Robbin Crosby – guitar
- Juan Croucier – bass guitar and backing vocals
- Bobby Blotzer – drums

== Charts ==
=== Weekly charts ===
Chart (1984)	Peak position
Canada Top Singles (RPM)	16
US Billboard Hot 100	12
US Mainstream Rock (Billboard)	4

=== Year-end charts ===
Chart (1984)	Peak position
US Billboard Hot 100	87
