= Out of the Cellar =

Studio album by Ratt
- Released: February 17, 1984
- Studios: Village Recorder (Los Angeles); Sound City (Los Angeles)
- Genres: Heavy metal; glam metal
- Length: 36:41
- Label: Atlantic
- Producer: Beau Hill

Ratt chronology
Ratt (1983)	Out of the Cellar (1984)	Invasion of Your Privacy (1985)

Singles from Out of the Cellar
- 1. "Round and Round" Released: February 1984 (US); 2. "Back for More" Released: 1984; 3. "Wanted Man" Released: September 1984 (US); 4. "Lack of Communication" Released: November 1984

Professional ratings
Review scores
Source	Rating
AllMusic	4.5/5 stars
Collector's Guide to Hevy Metal	9/10

Out of the Cellar is the debut studio album by the American heavy metal band Ratt, released in 1984 by Atlantic Records. The album was an immediate success, with wide airplay on radio and heavy rotation on MTV of its singles, especially the hit "Round and Round". The album is certified as triple platinum by the RIAA. The album brought Ratt to the top of the glam metal scene in Los Angeles. Out of the Cellar would prove to be the band's most successful album.

In 2017, Metal Hammer included the album in their list of "the 10 hair metal albums you need in your record collection". In 2018, Collin Brennan of Consequence included the album in his list of "10 Hair Metal Albums That Don’t Suck".

== Production and composition ==
Produced by Beau Hill, Out of the Cellar features Ratt's best-known hit, "Round and Round". It also contains other popular songs such as "Wanted Man", "Lack of Communication", and a re-recorded version of "Back for More". The latter song originally appeared on the EP Ratt. "In Your Direction" was a song that Pearcy wrote when the band was still called Mickey Ratt. "I'm Insane" and "Scene of the Crime" were songs Crosby had co-written and performed with his pre-Ratt band, Mac Meda, featuring future Riverdogs vocalist Rob Lamothe. "Wanted Man" was co-written by bassist Joey Cristofanilli, who had briefly substituted for Juan Croucier. Original lyrics for "She Wants Money" and "Lack of Communication" have been posted on Croucier's website.

According to interviews with Hill that were shot for the film Hair I Go Again, Tom Allom was originally slated to produce the record before he was recruited to do it.

The 40th anniversary remaster includes one previously unreleased track, "Reach for the Sky". The song was co-written by Croucier, Pearcy and future Bulletboys frontman Marq Torien. Ratt re-used the title in 1988 for a studio album not including the song.

== Cover art ==
The model on the album cover is actress Tawny Kitaen, better known for her appearances in Whitesnake music videos. The long-time girlfriend of Ratt guitarist Robbin Crosby at the time, Kitaen also appeared in the "Back for More" music video.

== Track listing ==
Side one
No.	Title	Writer(s)	Length
1.	"Wanted Man"	Robbin Crosby; Stephen Pearcy; Joey Cristofanilli	3:37
2.	"You're in Trouble"	Crosby; Warren DeMartini; Juan Croucier; Pearcy	3:16
3.	"Round and Round"	DeMartini; Crosby; Pearcy	4:22
4.	"In Your Direction"	Pearcy	3:30
5.	"She Wants Money"	Croucier	3:04

Side two
No.	Title	Writer(s)	Length
1.	"Lack of Communication"	Croucier; Pearcy	3:52
2.	"Back for More"	Croucier; Pearcy	3:42
3.	"The Morning After"	DeMartini; Crosby; Pearcy	3:30
4.	"I'm Insane"	Crosby	2:54
5.	"Scene of the Crime"	Crosby; Croucier	4:54
Total length:			37:19

40th Anniversary bonus track
No.	Title	Writer(s)	Length
11.	"Reach for the Sky"	Marq Torien; Croucier; Pearcy	3:26
Total length:			40:45

== Personnel ==
Ratt

- Stephen Pearcy – lead vocals
- Robbin Crosby – guitars, backing vocals
- Warren DeMartini – guitars, backing vocals
- Bobby Blotzer – drums, percussion
- Juan Croucier – bass guitar, backing vocals

Technical

- Beau Hill – producer, engineer
- Jim Faraci – engineer
- Dave Clark – assistant engineer
- Clif Smith – assistant engineer
- Robin Laine – assistant engineer
- Ray Leonard – assistant engineer
- Dennis King – mastering
- Barry Levine – photography
- Tawny Kitaen – cover model
- Bob Defrin – art direction

== Charts ==
Chart (1984)	Peak position
Canada Top Albums/CDs (RPM)	12
US Billboard 200	7

== Certifications ==
Region	Certification	Certified units/sales
Canada (Music Canada)	Platinum	100,000^{^}
Japan (RIAJ)	Gold	100,000^{^}
United States (RIAA)	3× Platinum	3,000,000^{^}
^{^} Shipments figures based on certification alone.

== See also ==
- List of glam metal albums and songs
