= Fitz and the Tantrums discography =

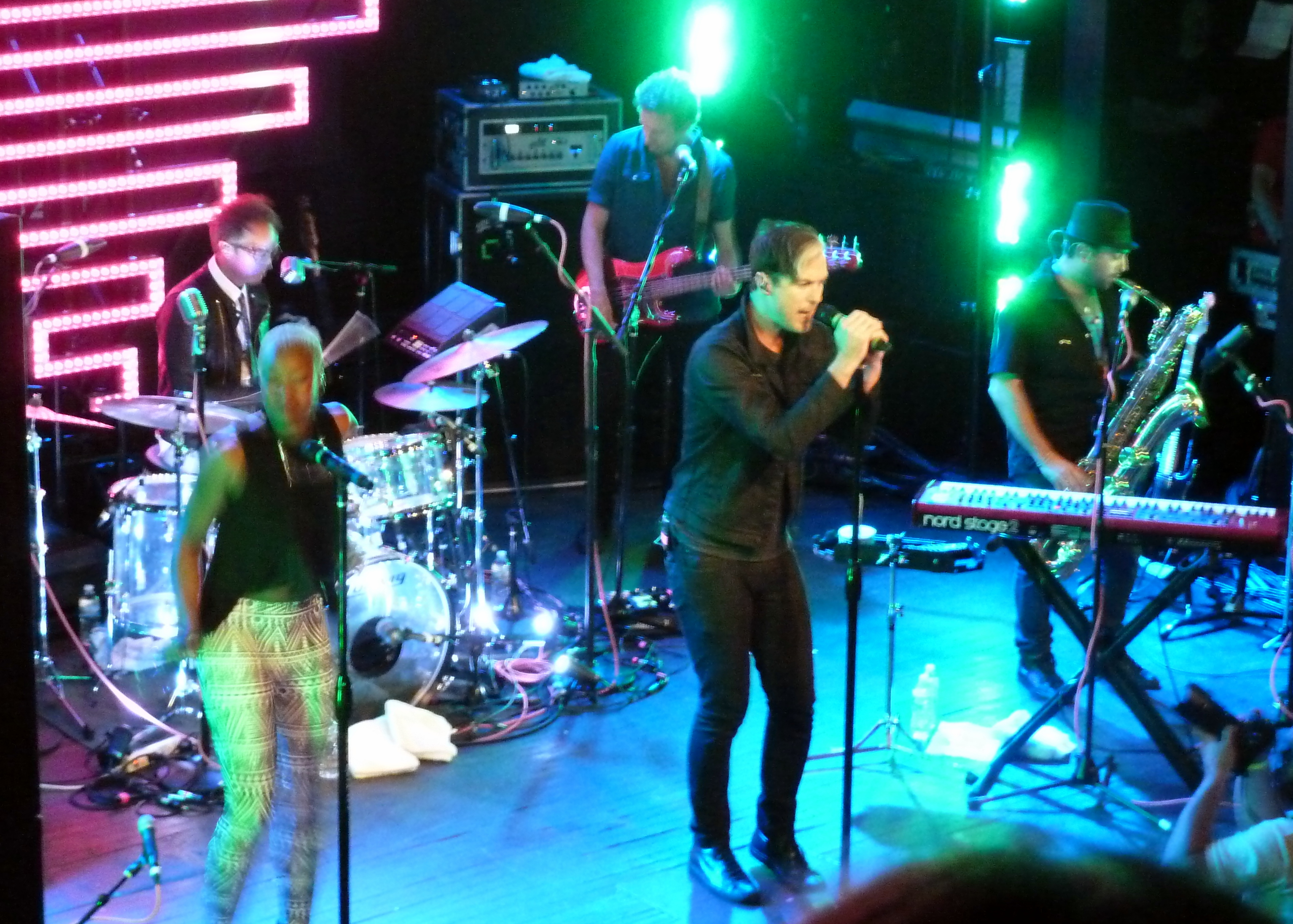
- Fitz and the Tantrums in 2013
- Studio albums: 5
- EPs: 3
- Singles: 18
- Music videos: 6

The following is the discography of Fitz and the Tantrums, a Los Angeles–based indie pop band formed in 2008 by Michael Fitzpatrick (lead vocals).

== Studio albums ==
List of studio albums, with selected chart positions.
Title	Details	Peak chart positions							Certifications
Title	Details	US	US Alt	US Rock	BEL (FL)	CAN	HUN	NED	Certifications
Pickin' Up the Pieces	Release date: August 24, 2010; Label: Dangerbird; Formats: CD, download, vinyl	140	—	—	— (Note: Pickin' Up the Pieces did not enter the Ultratop 200 Albums chart, but peaked at number 6 on the Flemish Heatseekers chart.)	—	—	83	
More Than Just a Dream	Release date: May 7, 2013; Label: Elektra; Formats: CD, download, vinyl	26	7	8	—	—	34	—	
Fitz and the Tantrums	Release date: June 10, 2016; Label: Elektra; Formats: CD, download, vinyl	17	4	6	—	44	—	—	RIAA: Gold
All the Feels	Release date: September 20, 2019; Label: Elektra; Formats: CD, download, vinyl	— (Note: All the Feels did not enter the US Billboard 200, but peaked at number 17 on the Digital Albums Chart.)	19	44	—	—	—	—	
Let Yourself Free	Release date: November 11, 2022; Label: Elektra; Formats: CD, download, vinyl	—	—	—	—	—	—	—	
Man on the Moon	Release date: July 25, 2025; Label: Atlantic; Formats: CD, download, vinyl								
"—" denotes a recording that did not chart or was not released in that territory.

=== Live albums ===
Title	Details
Live in Chicago	Release date: October 2, 2020; Label: Canyon Elektra; Formats: CD, download, vinyl

== Extended plays ==
Title	Details
Songs for a Breakup, Vol. 1	Release date: August 11, 2009; Label: Canyon Productions; Formats: CD, music download
Santa Stole My Lady	Release date: November 26, 2010; Label: Dangerbird Records; Formats: Vinyl, music download
Breakin' the Chains of Love EP	Release date: April 10, 2011; Label: Dangerbird Records; Formats: CD, music download
Perfect Holiday	Release date: November 10, 2023; Label: Elektra; Formats: Music download

=== Remix extended plays ===
Title	Details
Out of My League (Remixes)	Release date: July 30, 2013; Label: Elektra; Formats: Music download
The Walker Remix EP	Release date: May 27, 2014; Label: Elektra; Formats: Music download
HandClap (Remixes, Pt. 1)	Release date: June 9, 2016; Label: Elektra; Formats: Music download
HandClap (Remixes, Pt. 2)	Release date: June 9, 2016; Label: Elektra; Formats: Music download
Out of My League Collection	Release date: August 25, 2023; Label: Elektra; Formats: Music download

== Singles ==
=== As lead artist ===
List of singles, with selected chart positions and certifications, showing year released and album name
Title	Year	Peak chart positions										Certifications	Album
Title	Year	US	US Rock	AUS	AUT	CAN	GER	ITA	JPN	KOR	RUS	Certifications	Album
"Winds of Change"	2010	—	—	—	—	—	—	—	—	—	—		Pickin' Up the Pieces
"L.O.V."	2010	—	—	—	—	—	—	—	—	—	—		Pickin' Up the Pieces
"Breakin' the Chains of Love"	2010	—	—	—	—	—	—	—	—	—	—		Pickin' Up the Pieces
"MoneyGrabber"	2011	—	33	—	—	—	—	59	—	—	—	RIAA: Gold	Pickin' Up the Pieces
"Don't Gotta Work It Out"	2011	—	— (Note: "Don't Gotta Work It Out" did not enter the Hot Rock & Alternative Songs chart, but peaked at number 23 on the Adult Alternative Airplay chart.)	—	—	—	—	—	—	—	—		Pickin' Up the Pieces
"Out of My League"	2013	— (Note: "Out of My League" did not chart on the Billboard Hot 100 but did peak at number 1 on the Bubbling Under Hot 100 Singles chart, which is an extension of the Billboard Hot 100.)	14	—	—	65	—	—	—	—	—	RIAA: 5× Platinum; ARIA: 2× Platinum; BPI: Platinum; IFPI AUT: Gold; MC: 3× Platinum	More than Just a Dream
"The Walker"	2013	67	11	91	—	58	—	—	—	—	—	RIAA: Platinum; MC: Platinum	More than Just a Dream
"Fools Gold"	2014	—	26	—	—	—	—	—	—	—	—		More than Just a Dream
"HandClap"	2016	53	2	—	55	78	59	—	19	9	60	RIAA: 4× Platinum; ARIA: Platinum; BPI: Silver; BVMI: Gold; IFPI AUT: Gold; MC: 5× Platinum	Fitz and the Tantrums
"Roll Up"	2016	—	47	—	—	—	—	—	—	—	—		Fitz and the Tantrums
"Fool"	2017	—	34	—	—	—	—	—	—	—	—		Fitz and the Tantrums
"123456"	2019	—	33	—	—	—	—	—	—	—	—		All the Feels
"Don't Ever Let Em"	2019	—	—	—	—	—	—	—	—	—	—		All the Feels
"I Need Help!"	2019	—	— (Note: "I Need Help!" did not enter the Hot Rock & Alternative Songs chart, but peaked at number 11 on the Rock Digital Songs chart.)	—	—	—	—	—	—	—	—		All the Feels
"All the Feels"	2019	—	–	—	—	—	—	—	—	—	—		All the Feels
"I Just Wanna Shine"	2019	—	4	—	—	—	—	—	—	—	—		All the Feels
"Sway"	2022	—	—	—	—	—	—	—	—	—	—		Let Yourself Free
"The Wrong Party" (with Andy Grammer)	2022	—	—	—	—	—	—	—	—	—	—		Monster (Deluxe)
"Give Love This Year"	2023	—	—	—	—	—	—	—	—	—	—		Perfect Holiday
"No Goodbyes (Friends Forever)"	2024	—	—	—	—	—	—	—	—	—	—		Non-album single
"Ruin the Night"	2025	—	—	—	—	—	—	—	—	—	—		Man on the Moon
"Man on the Moon"	2025	—	—	—	—	—	—	—	—	—	—		Man on the Moon
"OK OK OK"	2025	—	—	—	—	—	—	—	—	—	—		Man on the Moon
"Radio Baby" (with Don Diablo)	2025	—	—	—	—	—	—	—	—	—	—		Non-album single
"Good Morning California"	2026	—	—	—	—	—	—	—	—	—	—		Man on the Moon: The Galaxy Edition
"—" denotes a recording that did not chart or was not released in that territory.

=== As featured artist ===
List of singles as featured artist, with selected chart positions, showing year released and album name
Title	Year	Peak chart positions			Album
Title	Year	US Dance	CIS	RUS	Album
"Broken Drum" (Cash Cash featuring Fitz of Fitz and the Tantrums)	2016	44	89	100	Blood, Sweat & 3 Years

=== Promotional singles ===
List of promotional singles, showing year released and album name
Title	Year	Album
"Dear Mr. President"	2011	Pickin' Up the Pieces
"Spark"	2013	More than Just a Dream
"Complicated"	2016	Fitz and the Tantrums
"Moneymaker"	2022	Let Yourself Free

== Other charting songs ==
Title	Year	Peak chart positions	Album
Title	Year	US Rock	Album
"Livin' for the Weekend"	2020	40	All the Feels

== Videos ==
=== Music videos ===
List of music videos, with directors, showing year released
Title	Year	Director(s)
"Winds of Change"	2009	Edon & Fitz
"MoneyGrabber"	2011	Michael Mohan
"Don't Gotta Work It Out"	2011	Charles Haine / Dirty Robber
"LOV"	2012	Eric Georgeson
"Out of My League"	2013	Jordan Bahat
"The Walker"	2013	Warren Kommers
"Fools Gold"	2014	Zak Stoltz
"HandClap"	2016	Marc Klasfeld
"Roll Up"	2016	Unknown
"Fool"	2017	Brother Willis
"123456"	2019	Jamie Thraves & Ofir Shoham
"Don't Ever Let Em"	2019	Rickett Sones
"I Need Help!"	2019	Rickett Sones
"All the Feels"	2019	Rickett Sones
"I Just Wanna Shine"	2019	Rickett Sones
"Sway"	2022	Taylor Kelly
"Moneymaker" (Phantogram Remix)	2023	Creeptoons
