= I Just Wanna Shine =

2019 single by Fitz and the Tantrums

Single by Fitz and the Tantrums

from the album All the Feels
- Released: July 14, 2019
- Length: 3:27
- Label: Elektra
- Songwriters: Michael Fitzpatrick; Noelle Scaggs; Joe Karnes; James King; Jeremy Ruzumna; John Wicks; Nick Long
- Producer: Jake Sinclair

Fitz and the Tantrums singles chronology
"All the Feels" (2019)	"I Just Wanna Shine" (2019)	"Sway" (2023)

Music video
- "I Just Wanna Shine" on YouTube

"I Just Wanna Shine" is a song by American indie pop band Fitz and the Tantrums. It was released on July 14, 2019, as the fourth single from the band's fourth studio album All the Feels. Band's members Michael Fitzpatrick, Noelle Scaggs, Joe Karnes, James King, Jeremy Ruzumna and John Wicks wrote the song with Nick Long, and it was produced by Jake Sinclair.

The song is used for promos advertising the weekday morning news for WABC-TV and became a sleeper hit after it was used in the film Ruby Gillman, Teenage Kraken.

The song was also used in media with the creation of the hockey game, NHL 20.

== Music video ==
An accompanying music video was released on July 15, 2019. The video shows young skateboarding breakdancer "practicing her craft" at different locations of Los Angeles, finally "culminating on the rooftop of her apartment building with the city's skyline behind her."

== Track listing ==
Digital download
No.	Title	Length
1.	"I Just Wanna Shine"	3:27

Digital download – radio edit
No.	Title	Length
1.	"I Just Wanna Shine" (radio edit)	3:16

Digital download – acoustic
No.	Title	Length
1.	"I Just Wanna Shine" (acoustic)	3:01

Digital download – Johan Lenox remix
No.	Title	Length
1.	"I Just Wanna Shine" (Johan Lenox remix)	3:48

== Credits and personnel ==
Credits adapted from AllMusic.

- Suzy Chin – Engineer
- Fitz and the Tantrums – composer, keyboards, primary artist, vocals,
- Joe Karnes – bass
- Joseph Karnes – composer
- James King – composer, horn
- Nick Long – composer, guitar
- Emerson Mancini – mastering
- Manny Marroquin – mixing
- Jeremy Ruzumna – composer, keyboards
- Noelle Scaggs – composer, vocals
- Jake Sinclair – producer
- Rachel White – assistant engineer
- John Wicks – composer, drums

== Charts ==
=== Weekly charts ===
Weekly chart performance for "I Just Wanna Shine"
Chart (2019–2020)	Peak position
Canada AC (Billboard)	43
Canada Hot AC (Billboard)	32
China Airplay/FL (Billboard)	50
US Adult Pop Airplay (Billboard)	10
US Hot Rock & Alternative Songs (Billboard)	4

=== Year-end charts ===
2020 year-end chart performance for "I Just Wanna Shine"
Chart (2020)	Position
US Adult Top 40 (Billboard)	27
US Hot Rock & Alternative Songs (Billboard)	36
