= Out of My League (song) =

Single by Fitz and the Tantrums

from the album More Than Just a Dream
- Released: February 7, 2013
- Genre: Indie pop; new wave; synth-pop
- Length: 3:31 (album version); 3:18 (radio edit)
- Label: Elektra
- Songwriters: Michael Fitzpatrick; Joseph Karnes; James King; Jeremy Ruzumna; Noelle Scaggs; John Wicks
- Producer: Tony Hoffer

Fitz and the Tantrums singles chronology
"Don't Gotta Work It Out" (2011)	"Out of My League" (2013)	"The Walker" (2013)

Music video
- "Out of My League" on YouTube

"Out of My League" is a song recorded by American band Fitz and the Tantrums and produced by Tony Hoffer. The song is the lead single from the band's second studio album, More Than Just a Dream. "Out of My League" was released as a single on February 7, 2013. The song became the group's first number one hit on the Alternative Songs chart, as well as making history for completing the slowest climb to the summit of the chart, at 33 weeks. The song was later used in the second season of Netflix’s Heartstopper.

The album's title, More Than Just a Dream, was taken from the lyric's intro and chorus.

== Other versions ==
A French version of the song, entitled "Out of My League (version française)", has also been released and has been played on Canadian radio. This version has most of the verses sung in French, while the chorus remains in English.

On July 30, 2013, Fitz and the Tantrums released four remixes of the single by Josh One, Peking Duk, Story of the Running Wolf, and TEPR.

In October 2013, DJ Earworm, Capital Cities, and Fitz and the Tantrums released a mash-up called "Kangaroo League", combining "Out of My League" with two songs by Capital Cities ("Kangaroo Court" and "Safe and Sound"), to promote the Capital Cities and Fitz and the Tantrums "Bright Futures" tour.

== Music video ==
The music video for "Out of My League," which was directed by Jordan Bahat and choreographed by Candice Love, was released on April 22, 2013, via VH1.com and MTV.com. The video utilizes Kinect camera mapping to produce kaleidoscopic, wire-framed, and duplicated visual effects.

== Track listing ==
All tracks are written by Michael Fitzpatrick.

Digital download
No.	Title	Length
1.	"Out of My League"	3:29

Digital download – remixes
No.	Title	Length
1.	"Out of My League" (Josh One Remix)	3:45
2.	"Out of My League" (Peking Duk Remix)	3:47
3.	"Out of My League" (Story of the Running Wolf Remix)	3:24
4.	"Out of My League" (TEPR Remix)	4:39

== Chart performance ==
=== Weekly charts ===
Chart (2013–2014)	Peak position
Canada Hot 100 (Billboard)	65
Canada Rock (Billboard)	16
US Bubbling Under Hot 100 (Billboard)	1
US Adult Pop Airplay (Billboard)	14
US Hot Rock & Alternative Songs (Billboard)	14
US Rock & Alternative Airplay (Billboard)	1

=== Year-end charts ===
Chart (2013)	Position
US Hot Rock Songs (Billboard)	28
US Rock Airplay (Billboard)	9

Chart (2014)	Position
US Hot Rock Songs (Billboard)	49
US Rock Airplay (Billboard)	33

=== All-time charts ===
Chart (1995–2021)	Position
US Adult Alternative Songs (Billboard)	70

== Certifications ==
Region	Certification	Certified units/sales
Australia (ARIA)	2× Platinum	140,000^{‡}
Austria (IFPI Austria)	Gold	15,000^{*}
Canada (Music Canada)	3× Platinum	240,000^{‡}
New Zealand (RMNZ)	Platinum	30,000^{‡}
United Kingdom (BPI)	Platinum	600,000^{‡}
United States (RIAA)	5× Platinum	5,000,000^{‡}
^{*} Sales figures based on certification alone.^{‡} Sales+streaming figures based on certification alone.
