= Santa Stole My Lady =

EP by Fitz and the Tantrums
- Released: November 26, 2010
- Recorded: 2010
- Genre: Neo soul
- Length: 7:38
- Label: Dangerbird
- Producer: Chris Seefried

Fitz and the Tantrums chronology
Pickin' Up the Pieces (2010)	Santa Stole My Lady (2010)	More Than Just a Dream (2013)

Santa Stole My Lady is the second studio EP by the American indie rock band Fitz and the Tantrums, released on November 26, 2010 through Dangerbird Records. It was released both digitally and as a special 7" vinyl single.

== Track listing ==
1. "Santa Stole My Lady" (Michael Fitzpatrick) – 3:00
2. "Darkest Street" (Fitzpatrick, Chris Seefried) – 4:38

== Personnel ==
- Michael Fitzpatrick
- Noelle Scaggs
- Joseph Karnes
- James King
- Jeremy Ruzumna
- John Wicks
