= Songs for a Breakup, Vol. 1 =

Songs for a Breakup: Vol. 1

EP by Fitz and the Tantrums
- Released: August 11, 2009 (original release); May 20, 2010 (re-release)
- Recorded: 2009
- Genre: Neo soul
- Length: 19:37
- Label: Canyon; Dangerbird (re-release)
- Producer: Chris Seefried

Fitz and the Tantrums chronology
| Songs for a Breakup: Vol. 1 (2009) | Pickin' Up the Pieces (2010) |

Songs for a Breakup: Vol. 1 is the debut studio EP by the American indie rock band Fitz and the Tantrums, released on August 11, 2009 through Canyon Productions. It was re-released in 2010 when the band signed to Dangerbird Records.

== Track listing ==
All tracks are written by Michael Fitzpatrick and Chris Seefried, unless noted.

Songs for a Breakup: Vol. 1
| No. | Title | Length |
|---|---|---|
| 1. | "Breakin' the Chains of Love" (Fitzpatrick) | 2:51 |
| 2. | "Don't Gotta Work It Out" | 4:09 |
| 3. | "Darkest Street" | 4:40 |
| 4. | "Winds of Change" | 4:09 |
| 5. | "We Don't Need Love Songs" | 3:55 |
| Total length: | | 19:37 |

== Personnel ==
- Michael Fitzpatrick
- Noelle Scaggs
- Joseph Karnes
- James King
- Jeremy Ruzumna
- John Wicks

== Additional personnel ==
- Chris Seefried – producer, guitar, bass, vocals, keyboards
- Maya Azucena – vocals
- Sebastian Steinberg – bass
- Matt Cooker – cello
- Stewart Cole – trumpet
- Scott Ellis – drums
- Tay Strathairn – piano
- Chris Constable – mixing
- Josh Brochhausen – mixing
- Gavin Lurssen – mastering
- Edon – photography
- Alex Tenta – design, layout
- Lisa Nupoff – management
- Brian Klein – management
