= Josh One =

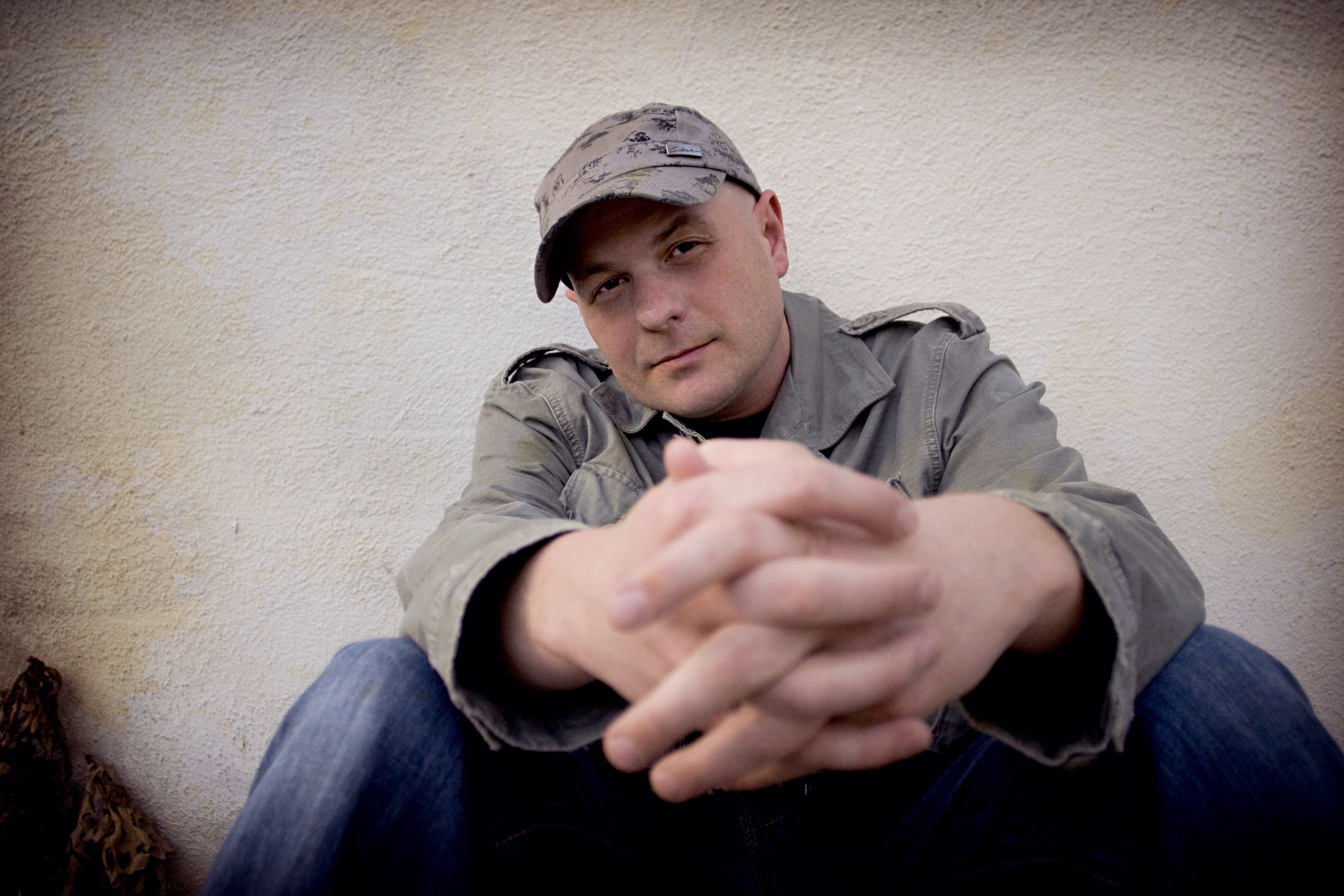
- Josh One in 2014

Background information
- Born: Joshua Noteboom; March 14, 1975 (age 51); Sioux City, Iowa, United States
- Genres: Hip hop, trip hop, soul, electronica
- Occupations: Producer, DJ, Musician
- Instruments: Turntables, Keyboards, Synthesizers
- Years active: 1995–present
- Labels: Boomnote, Plug Research, Atlantic, Elektra
- Website: boomnotemusic.com

Josh One (born Joshua Noteboom, March 14, 1975 in Sioux City, Iowa, United States) is an American producer and DJ, based in Long Beach, California.

== History ==
His debut recording as a solo artist was "Contemplation", in 2001. He remixed the three time, Grammy Award nominated Nappy Roots "Po' Folk's" on Atlantic Records. Josh One's debut album, Narrow Path, was released in 2004, and featured Aloe Blacc and Myka 9. His second album Tolerance, was released in 2009. He remixed Fitz and the Tantrums "Out of My League" that went platinum sales and hit No. 1 on the Billboard Alternative chart, on Elektra Records.

In 2005 he created Boomnote Music, an independent record label and production company.

== Discography ==
=== Solo albums ===
- Grey Skies EP Immergent (2003)
- Narrow Path LP Immergent (2004)
- Tolerance LP Boomnote Music (2009)
- Tolerance (Instrumentals & Remixes) Boomnote Music (2010)
- Wrong Way Remixes EP Plug Research Records (2015)
- Further Remixed EP Boomnote Music (2016)
- Time Stamp LP Boomnote Music (2017)
- Time Stamp (Instrumentals) LP Boomnote Music (2018)
- You know Singles (2024)
- Algoriddim Singles (2024)
- This Far Singles (2024)
- Exit Fee LP (2025)
