= MoneyGrabber =

Single by Fitz and the Tantrums

from the album Pickin' Up the Pieces
- Released: August 15, 2011
- Recorded: 2010
- Genre: Neo soul
- Length: 3:09
- Label: Dangerbird
- Songwriters: Michael Fitzpatrick; Chris Seefried
- Producers: Michael Fitzpatrick; Chris Seefried

Fitz and the Tantrums singles chronology
"Breakin' the Chains of Love" (2010)	"MoneyGrabber" (2011)	"Don't Gotta Work It Out" (2011)

Music video
- "MoneyGrabber" on YouTube

"MoneyGrabber" is a song by American band Fitz and the Tantrums from their debut 2010 studio album, Pickin' Up the Pieces. The song was released as an official single by Dangerbird Records on August 15, 2011. The song was used in the 2013 commercial for New Amsterdam Vodka and also appeared in Season 6, episode 5 of the television show Criminal Minds.

== Music video ==
The music video for "MoneyGrabber" was directed by Michael Mohan. The video depicts the band performing under red and blue stage lights.

== Tracks ==
Promo CD-Single Dangerbird / V2

1. MoneyGrabber - 3:09

CD Single Dangerbird Records – VVNL21933, V2 – VVNL21933

1. MoneyGrabber - 3:09
2. Breakin' the Chains of Love (Live From Candor) - 3:17

== Charts ==
Chart (2011)	Peak position
Belgium (Ultratip Bubbling Under Flanders)	30
US Adult Alternative Airplay (Billboard)	2
US Adult Pop Airplay (Billboard)	34
US Hot Rock & Alternative Songs (Billboard)	33

== Certifications ==
Region	Certification	Certified units/sales
United States (RIAA)	Gold	500,000^{‡}
^{‡} Sales+streaming figures based on certification alone.
