= Man on the Moon (Fitz and the Tantrums album) =

Studio album by Fitz and the Tantrums
- Released: July 25, 2025
- Length: 34:29
- Label: Atlantic

Fitz and the Tantrums chronology
Perfect Holiday (2023)	Man on the Moon (2025)

Singles from Man on the Moon
- 1. "Ruin the Night" Released: March 28, 2025; 2. "Man on the Moon" Released: May 7, 2025; 3. "OK OK OK" Released: June 27, 2025

Man on the Moon is the sixth studio album by the American band Fitz and the Tantrums. It was released on July 25, 2025, by Atlantic Records. The album follows their previous album, Let Yourself Free (2022) and their 2023 EP, Perfect Holiday (2023).

== Background ==
In a press release relating to the album, Fitz and the Tantrums said that for this album, they took a creative approach similar to that of their previous album Let Yourself Free (2022), with lead vocalist Michael Fitzpatrick commenting: "I decided I was simply going to write for my heart and for my soul and nobody else [...] At this point in our career, myself and the band feel we have complete creative license. Because, c’mon, nobody knows what the rules are anymore. So I’m not going to chase some vapor in the wind. I’m going to just do what I want." Co-lead vocalist Noelle Scaggs also explained how the band refused to be pigeonholed into one sound, remarking that they "were daring to be different" with this album.

== Promotion ==
The album was preceded by the release of three singles. The lead single, "Ruin the Night", was released on March 28, 2025. Of the song, Fitzpatrick said in a statement that it was about "trying to move on while the past is still living rent-free in your head". The second single, the album's title song "Man on the Moon", was released on May 7, 2025 in tandem with the album's announcement. The third and final single, "OK OK OK", was released on June 27, 2025.

On July 25, 2025, the same day the album was released, a visualizer for "Young Days" was released..

A deluxe edition titled Man on the Moon (The Galaxy Edition) was released on June 5, 2026. The deluxe edition was preceded by its single, "Good Morning California", which was released on May 1, 2026.

== Critical reception ==
In a review of the album for Glide Magazine, Shawn Donohue criticized most of the album's songs' "noticeably short" runtimes and lamented how they "seem to cut out before overstaying their welcome or blossoming into something memorable", while further labeling them "serviceable, if a bit derivative at times".

== Track listing ==
Man on the Moon track listing
No.	Title	Writer(s)	Producer(s)	Length
1.	"The Good the Bad the Ugly"	Annie Schindel; Fitz; Jonas Jeberg; Rasmus Soegren; Stephen Ellrod	Jeberg; Soegren	2:19
2.	"Man on the Moon"	Fitz; Jeberg; Olivia Knox; Soegren; Ellrod	Jeberg; Soegren	2:30
3.	"Withdrawls"	Fitz; Jeberg; Knox; Ellrod	Jeberg	2:29
4.	"Oh Maria"	Fitz; Jeberg; Knox; Soegren; Ellrod	Jeberg; Soegren	2:21
5.	"Ruin the Night"	Fitz; Jeberg; Knox; Ellrod	Jeberg	2:28
6.	"Where I Go"	Fitz; Jeberg; Knox; Soegren; Ellrod	Jeberg; Soegren	2:20
7.	"Young Days"	Darius Dragoi; Lee Anna McCollum; Noelle Scaggs; Serban Cazan	Scaggs; Cazan	3:13
8.	"Perfume"	Fitz; Jeberg; Knox; Ellrod	Jeberg	2:49
9.	"Umbrella"	Fitz; Mike Robinson; Ryan Daly; Sarah Troy; Ellrod	Robinson; Daly	1:44
10.	"Queen of Hearts"	Brian Phillips; Cici Ward; Fitz; Lily Hormel	Phillips	2:04
11.	"Waste My Time"	Phillips; Ward; Ethan Thompson; Fitz; Malia Civetz	Phillips	2:47
12.	"OK OK OK"	Fitz; Jeberg; Knox; Ellrod	Jeberg	1:57
13.	"Motion"	Phillips; Ward; Fitz	Phillips	2:25
14.	"One Day"	Fitz; Griff Clawson; Jeberg	Jeberg	3:03
Total length:				34:29

Man on the Moon (The Galaxy Edition) – Deluxe edition
No.	Title	Length
15.	"Good Morning California"	2:07
16.	"Greenlight"	2:44
17.	"Not Waiting on the World"	2:01
Total length:		41:21
