= Bråves =

Pop band

- Origin: Los Angeles, California, U.S.
- Genres: Indie pop, lo-fi, electropop
- Years active: 2015–present
- Labels: Rostrum
- Members: Johnny What; Jericho Wood; Thorald Wood

Bråves, stylized as BRÅVES, is an American-Australian pop band and production group from Los Angeles, California. The band consists of American producer Johnny What and Australian lead vocalists, brothers Jericho and Thorald Wood.

== History ==
Bråves was formed in 2015. In the band's early days, they were known for hiding their identities by wearing masks and veils. They enjoy being obscure and rarely, if ever, perform live. Despite this, they have picked up a notable underground following. Their music has been compared to that of Terror Jr.

They released their debut extended play, BRÅVES EP II, on April 18, 2016. On October 26, 2016 they released the EP III. On March 10, 2017 they released the EP MMXVII. They released their debut album, and their only full-length release to date, BRÅVES, on February 23, 2017. The band revealed their faces later in 2017. They have not released a full project since 2017, but they continue to release singles and collaborate with other artists. These include Walk the Moon, P!NK, Coldplay, and Fitz and The Tantrums.

== Discography ==
=== Studio albums ===
- BRÅVES (2017)

=== Extended plays ===
- BRÅVES EP II (2016)
- III (2016)
- MMXVII (2017)

=== Singles ===
- "Me The Thief" (2016)
- "California" (2017)
- "Hunger" (2018)
- "Favourite Sweater" (2018)
- "World's On Fire" (feat. Nikki Reed) (2018)
- "Busy" (2018)
- "Great For You" (with Noelle Scaggs) (2018)
- "Come Down" (2019)
- "Karma Creeps" (with Jon Bryant) (2019)
- "Lose You Again" (with Walk the Moon) (2019)
- "All About You" (with TOMI) (2019)
- "Mean Girls" (with Lilli Wilder) (2020)
- "The Wall" (2020)
- "Happy" (2020)
- "Apes On Parade" (2020)
- "Let It Out" (2020)
- "Claire De Lune" (2020)
- "I'm Kissing You" (2025)
