= Marc Abrams =

American physician and local celebrity in Los Angeles, California

- Born: August 19, 1951; Philadelphia, Pennsylvania
- Died: July 21, 2010 (aged 58); Los Angeles, California
- Other names: Silver Lake Walking Man
- Occupation: physician
- Known for: shirtless walks around the Silver Lake neighborhood

Marc Abrams (19 August 1951 – 21 July 2010), known as the Silver Lake Walking Man, was a physician and local celebrity in Los Angeles, California, known for his shirtless walks around the Silver Lake neighborhood.

== Personal life ==
Abrams was born on 19 August 1951. He was originally from Philadelphia. He stated that his family did not have a car growing up, so he was forced to walk everywhere. He studied music and history at Dickinson College before pursuing his medical degree at Stanford University. He relocated to Silver Lake in 1980 with his first wife, Patricia (d. 1991).

The Los Angeles Times described him as an "eccentric" and a "fitness nut", and he would walk shirtless up to 20 miles a day in the neighborhood while reading. He stated that the only motive for walking was to get outside and stay in shape.

Abrams gained prominence as a local fixture of Silver Lake. He was the inspiration behind a documentary film and for two murals on Sunset Boulevard.

== Career ==
Abrams was a medical doctor who practiced out of an office in North Hollywood with his wife Cindy. He primarily saw patients in the late evening. He retired in 2009.

At the time of his death, Abrams was under investigation for unlawfully providing prescription drugs to patients. One such patient overdosed in 2008, causing Abrams to be the target of a wrongful death case.

== Death and legacy ==
Abrams was found dead at the age of 58 in the hot tub of his home on 21 July 2010. The LAPD ruled it a suicide by drowning. Soon after his death, a memorial walk was organized by local residents and was attended by several hundred. Participants commemorated Abrams by walking his usual route.

Abrams was the inspiration behind the 2013 Fitz & The Tantrums song "The Walker".
