= Royal Teeth =

American indie pop band

- Origin: Lafayette, Louisiana, United States
- Genres: Indie pop, dance-rock
- Years active: 2010–2023
- Labels: Elektra, Dangerbird
- Members: Gary Larsen; Nora Patterson; Thomas Onebane; Josh Hefner
- Past members: Andrew Poe; Steve Billeaud; Joshua Wells; Shawn Heaps
- Website: royalteethmusic.com

Royal Teeth was an American indie pop band from Lafayette and Baton Rouge, Louisiana, formed in 2010. The group consisted of singer and guitarist Gary Larsen, singer Nora Patterson, guitarist Thomas Onebane, bassist Joshua Wells, and drummer Josh Hefner. They released their debut EP Act Naturally in 2011 and debut LP "Glow" in 2013.

== History ==
=== Formation ===
Gary Larsen became acquainted online with Wells, Hefner, and keyboardist Andrew Poe, all of whom were at the time members of the band Oh Juliet based in Lafayette, Louisiana. After the group's dissolution in 2010, Wells invited Larsen to move to Lafayette to work on a new musical project. The duo were eventually joined by Wells' ex-bandmates Poe and Hefner, and guitarist Steve Billeaud. The band was completed by the addition of Baton Rouge native Patterson.

=== Act Naturally (2010–2012) ===
The duo's initial music was mostly folk-driven, but shifted to a more electronic-based full band sound as more and more members were added. Royal Teeth recorded their 5-track debut extended play Act Naturally in Charleston, South Carolina with producer Eric Bass and released it July 2011. Upon their signing with Dangerbird Records in April 2012, "Act Naturally" was re-released on May 8, 2012 The EP features the song "Wild" along with a cover of The Knife's single "Heartbeats".

After the release of Act Naturally, the band went on tour nationally, performing at festivals including CMJ, ACL, Snowglobe, Summerfest, SXSW 2012 alongside bands such as The Kooks, Fitz and the Tantrums, and Walk the Moon.

Royal Teeth's first tour was opening for the 2012 reunion of NY Nerdcore act 2 Skinnee J's.

=== Glow (2013–present) ===
In February 2013, Royal Teeth travelled to Toronto to begin recording their debut full-length studio album "Glow" with Gavin Brown (Metric). On March 25, 2013, the band appeared on Last Call with Carson Daly performing "Wild". Royal Teeth released Glow, on August 13, 2013 via Dangerbird Records. 2013 also included performances at Boston Calling, SXSW, CMJ, Jazzfest, Voodoo Music Experience and tours with The Mowglis, American Authors, Said The Whale, and The Rocket Summer.

After Glow's release, Poe and Billeaud left the band, which was then joined by another ex-Oh Juliet member, guitarist Thomas Onebane.

On March 20, 2014, Royal Teeth made a guest appearance on season 13 of American Idol, performing "Wild". Touring behind their debut LP, the band played marquee festivals such as the New Orleans Jazz & Heritage Festival, as well as Bonnaroo, Firefly, Bunbury, Summerfest, Voodoo Music Experience and SXSW.

"Wild" has been featured several times in commercials, ads, and TV, including the launches of the Samsung Galaxy S5, and Buick Verano, State Farm, Bose, American Eagle, Metro AG, The Voice, 90210, ESPN, TLC, PBS, Yahoo & Fox. "Wild" was also featured on the popular soccer video game by EA Sports, FIFA 13, as well as the soundtrack and movie G.B.F.

April 21, 2015, Royal Teeth announced that they had signed with Elektra Records. April 11, 2016, it was reported that the band and Elektra Records had "parted ways".

On November 18, 2016 the band released their second extended play, Amateurs.

In 2018, Royal Teeth released two singles, It's Just the Start and Never Gonna Quit.

The band's second studio album, Hard Luck, was released in 2019.

This group disbanded on June 18, 2023.

== Band members ==
=== Current ===
- Gary Larsen – vocals, guitar, percussion
- Nora Patterson – vocals
- Josh Hefner – drums
- Thomas Onebane – guitar

=== Former ===
- Andrew Poe – keyboard
- Steve Billeaud – guitar
- Joshua Wells – bass guitar

=== Sound Engineer ===
- Kieran McIntosh

== Discography ==
=== Studio albums ===
- Glow (2013)
- Hard Luck (2019)

=== Extended plays ===
- Act Naturally (2011)
- Amateurs (2016)
