= Slow Mass =

American rock band

- Origin: Chicago, IL
- Genres: Post-Hardcore; Indie rock; Post-Rock
- Years active: 2015–present
- Label: Landland Colportage
- Members: Dave Collis; Josh Sparks; Josh Parks; Mercedes Webb; Evan Bernard; Sean Hallock; Emma McCall
- Past members: David Maruzzella
- Website: slowmassmusic.com

Slow Mass is an American rock band from Chicago, Illinois featuring former members of Into It. Over It., Damiera, and No Sleep Records alum Former Thieves. They took their name from the Glenn Branca composition.

== History ==
Slow Mass began in 2015. The following year, they released their first extended play, Treasure Pains, with the record label Landland Colportage. In 2018, Slow Mass released their debut full-length album titled On Watch.

Throughout 2019 and 2020, Slow Mass released a trio of 7"s under their Music for Ears series. In October 2020, the band released a surprise album titled Music for Rest. The release provided a sonic departure from their existing catalog with an hour long ambient composition broken up into 50 tracks.

In 2021, the band's momentum was halted after frontman Dave Collis was accused of sexual assault. Dangerbird Records severed ties with the band as a result of the allegation. In early 2022, singer-bassist Mercedes Webb released a statement on the band's social media pages discussing the allegation and text messages that had surfaced from the accuser. The allegation resulted in a lawsuit and counter-suit, which was settled outside of civil court with a joint statement between both parties.

The band resumed release activity in 2024 with a new EP titled Drift Themes, released by Landland Colportage.

On March 5, 2025, the band announced their second studio album Low on Foot, due out May 16. The announce was accompanied by a music video for the lead single "Hogtied", directed by Marisa Dabice of the band Mannequin Pussy. The album features guest contributions from Nnamdï, Nick Reinhart (Tera Melos), Jon Nuñez (Torche), Macie Stewart (Finom) and more.

== Band members ==
Current line-up

- Dave Collis – vocals, guitar (2015–present)
- Joshua Sparks – drums (2015–2017, 2018–present)
- Joshua Parks – guitar (2015–present)
- Mercedes Webb - vocals, bass, synth (2015–present)
- Evan Bernard - guitar (touring 2017–2019, 2020–present)
- Sean Hallock - drums (touring 2019, 2020–present)
- Emma McCall - guitar (touring 2021, 2024–present)

Contributors

- David Maruzzella - drums (2017–2018)
- Dylan Nadon - drums (touring 2020)
- Ryan Packard - vibraphone (session 2015–present, live 2018)

== Discography ==
Studio albums

- On Watch (2018)
- Low on Foot (2025)

EPs

- Treasure Pains (2016)
- Drift Themes (2024)

Singles

- Music for Ears 1 (2019)
- Music for Ears 2 (2020)
- Music for Ears 3 (2020)
- GBP (2026)

Miscellaneous

- Music for Rest (2020)
