= The Walker (song) =

Single by Fitz and the Tantrums

from the album More Than Just a Dream
- Released: December 10, 2013
- Genre: Indie pop; neo soul; electropop
- Length: 3:53
- Label: Elektra
- Songwriter(s): Fitz and the Tantrums
- Producer(s): Tony Hoffer

Fitz and the Tantrums singles chronology
"Out of My League" (2013)	"The Walker" (2013)	"Fools Gold" (2014)

Music video
- "The Walker” on YouTube

"The Walker" is a song by the American neo soul band Fitz and the Tantrums. It is the second single from the band's second album More Than Just a Dream. The song was used in two scenes of the film Identity Thief, the trailers for the films The Boxtrolls and Storks, in the trailer for video game The Sims 4, in television commercials for the 86th Academy Awards that were hosted by Ellen DeGeneres, in the 2014 Major League Baseball postseason and in commercials for Sprite, Supercuts, Reebok ZQuick and Walmart. From 2014 until the end of the 2017 season, the song was used as the opening theme to the MLB Network show High Heat, hosted by Christopher "Mad Dog" Russo. The song is also featured in the pilot episode of the FOX television sitcom Grandfathered as well as the Netflix original series The Umbrella Academy. It has also been used in the soundtrack of the video game NBA 2K18. The song introduces S3E9 of Suits.

The song was inspired by Marc Abrams, a man who was known for walking up to 20 miles a day in Silver Lake, Los Angeles.

== Music video ==
The video, directed by Warren Kommers, centers around an everyman protagonist (played by Arne Gjelten) who is waiting in line outside the DMV in the sweltering summer heat (band members Michael Fitzpatrick and Noelle Scaggs are also seen in line). Looking increasingly agitated, he suddenly jumps out of line and begins dancing and gesturing his frustration, before storming off. The man is shown walking through the streets of Los Angeles to the beat of the song, occasionally with passerby joining in dance routines with him, and all showing similar frustrated body language and facial expressions.

The protagonist engages in other expressions of anger like punching a chunk out of a cement building, getting in an argument with a police officer who tries to ticket him for jaywalking, walking over an occupied car and dancing on the roof, kicking a boot off a car, bending a No Parking sign in half, and shouting to the sky in a dead-end alleyway. He finally returns to the DMV where he and all the other customers perform another dance routine. The video closes with the man suddenly back in line, implying the entire sequence occurred in his imagination.

== Track listing ==
- Digital download
1. "The Walker" – 3:53
- Digital EP – The Walker Remix EP
1. "The Walker" (Cobra Starship Remix) – 4:26
2. "The Walker" (Aston Shuffle Remix) – 5:05
3. "The Walker" (Vice Remix) – 4:37
4. "The Walker" (Ryeland Allison Remix) – 3:27
5. "The Walker" (Mack & Jet Set Remix) – 5:22
6. "The Walker" (GLOS Remix) – 4:03

== Chart performance ==
=== Weekly charts ===
Chart (2013–14)	Peak position
Australia (ARIA)	91
Canada (Canadian Hot 100)	58
Canada Hot AC (Billboard)	28
Canada Rock (Billboard)	12
US Billboard Hot 100	67
US Adult Pop Airplay (Billboard)	13
US Hot Rock & Alternative Songs (Billboard)	11
US Rock & Alternative Airplay (Billboard)	4

=== Year-end charts ===
Chart (2014)	Position
US Adult Top 40 (Billboard)	40
US Hot Rock Songs (Billboard)	22
US Rock Airplay (Billboard)	5

== Certifications ==
Region	Certification	Certified units/sales
Canada (Music Canada)	Platinum	80,000^{‡}
United States (RIAA)	Platinum	1,000,000^{‡}
^{‡} Sales+streaming figures based on certification alone.
