= More Than Just a Dream =

Studio album by Fitz and the Tantrums
- Released: May 7, 2013
- Studios: The Sound Factory (Studio B), Los Angeles
- Genres: Neo soul; indie pop
- Length: 43:06
- Label: Elektra
- Producer: Tony Hoffer

Fitz and the Tantrums chronology
Santa Stole My Lady (2010)	More Than Just a Dream (2013)	Fitz and the Tantrums (2016)

Singles from More Than Just a Dream
- 1. "Out of My League" Released: February 7, 2013; 2. "The Walker" Released: December 10, 2013; 3. "Fools Gold" Released: August 12, 2014

More Than Just a Dream is the second and major-label debut studio album by American band Fitz and the Tantrums, released on May 7, 2013, by Elektra Records. The album was produced by Tony Hoffer (Beck, M83, Depeche Mode, Phoenix) at The Sound Factory in Los Angeles. The title comes from a line of the chorus from the group's lead single "Out of My League". Their song "Spark" also featured in the soundtrack to EA Sports game, FIFA 13, as well as adverts for British retailer chain Argos from 2014 until 2019.

The album is their first release for Elektra Records. The band signed with the label's current president Jeff Castelaz, who initially signed the band to their original deal at Dangerbird Records, which Castelaz co-founded in 2004.

== Critical reception ==
Professional ratings
Aggregate scores
Source	Rating
Metacritic	64/100
Review scores
Source	Rating
AllMusic	4/5 stars
Alternative Press	1.5/5 stars
American Songwriter	2.5/5 stars
The A.V. Club	B−
Entertainment Weekly	B
Los Angeles Times	2.5/4 stars
Paste	7.8/10
PopMatters	6/10
Rolling Stone	3/5 stars
Spin	4/10

More Than Just a Dream has received generally positive reception by the music critics. At Metacritic, they assign a "weighted average" score to ratings and reviews from selected mainstream critics, and the album has a score of 64 out of 100, based on 12 reviews.

AllMusic's Matt Collar found this to be "an even more infectious, club-ready album" than its predecessor, and at the same time "still retaining all of the band's organic soulfulness." At Paste, Ryan Reed proclaimed that the album "is poised for prime time, a diabetic coma of sugar-rush pop." Beth Kellmurray of diffuser.fm told that "by diversifying their approach, Fitz creates a sound that doesn’t get dulled or play like a mere gimmick", and this is the reason she felt that the release "proves the group can find longevity in their eclectic sound." At Glide Magazine, Jeremy Lukens wrote that "it wouldn't be accurate to label More Than Just a Dream a fun but hollow party album, though." Bryan Bierman of The A.V. Club alluded to how the album "is a leap for the band sonically" that "still manages to be entertaining." At Los Angeles Times, Randall Roberts evoked that "there's a fine line between evolution and de-evolution, and which process Fitz and the Tantrums is experiencing on its sophomore effort", and this all relies "on what you liked about the L.A. band's breakout debut."

However, PopMatters' AJ Ramirez found that "it’s an album that’s hard to love, yet easy to like." At Rolling Stone, Jody Rosen told that "the pleasures of the songcraft don't quite compensate for dopey lyrics, the bland vocals of Fitz and co-lead singer Noelle Scaggs, and the relentless spazzing-out." Hal Horowitz of American Songwriter affirmed that "while there is no lack of energy in the performances, many songs seem forced and lack the organic groove that effective soul music demands." At Spin, Michaelangelo Matos felt that the album is "steps backwards [...] where its predecessor was shockingly felt, this settles for something more distant, theatrical, grandiose." The lone negative review came in from Alternative Press and Scott Heisel, and he criticized it with writing that "this is the most boring Hall & Oates record ever."

== Track listing ==
All tracks are written by Michael Fitzpatrick, Noelle Scaggs, James King, Jeremy Rezumna, Joseph Karnes, and John Wicks and produced by Tony Hoffer. Additional writers are included below.

No.	Title	Writer(s)	Length
1.	"Out of My League"		3:31
2.	"Break the Walls"	Chris Seefried; Sia Furler	3:36
3.	"The Walker"		3:53
4.	"Spark"	Dave Bassett	3:19
5.	"6am"		4:30
6.	"Fools Gold"	Bassett	3:35
7.	"Keepin Our Eyes Out"		3:09
8.	"Last Raindrop"	Seefried	4:03
9.	"House on Fire"	Seefried	3:28
10.	"The End"		3:47
11.	"Get Away"	Seefried	2:56
12.	"MerryGoRound"		3:32
Total length:			43:06

Deluxe Edition
No.	Title	Length
13.	"Tell Me What Ya Here For"	3:17
14.	"Out of My League" (Tepr Remix)	4:35
Total length:		50:58

== Personnel ==
Fitz and the Tantrums

- Michael Fitzpatrick – vocals, keyboards, production, engineering
- Noelle Scaggs – vocals, percussion
- James King – saxophone, flute, guitar
- Joseph Karnes – bass guitar
- Jeremy Ruzumna – keyboards
- John Wicks – drums, percussion

Production

- Tony Hoffer – producer, guitar, programming, additional synths
- Todd Burke – recording engineer, mixing
- Neal Avron – mixing ("Fool's Gold")
- Dave Cooley – mastering

== Charts ==
Chart (2013)	Peak position
US Billboard 200	26
Hungarian Albums (MAHASZ)	34

== Release history ==
Region	Date	Label	Format
United States	May 7, 2013	Elektra	CD; LP; digital download
