= Don't Gotta Work It Out =

Single by Fitz and the Tantrums

from the album Pickin' Up the Pieces
- Released: September 23, 2011
- Genre: Indie pop, neo soul
- Length: 4:10
- Label: Dangerbird
- Songwriters: Michael Fitzpatrick, Chris Seefried

Fitz and the Tantrums singles chronology
"MoneyGrabber" (2011)	"Don't Gotta Work It Out" (2011)	"Out of My League" (2013)

Music video
- "Don't Gotta Work It Out" on YouTube

"Don't Gotta Work It Out" is a song by American band Fitz and the Tantrums from their debut studio album Pickin' Up the Pieces, released on September 23, 2011.

== Music video ==
The song's music video debuted on VH1 on September 20, 2011. The music video, which was directed by Charles Haine and produced by Chris Uettwiller via Dirty Robber, was shot at night on location in Bakersfield, California.

== Charts ==
Chart (2011)	Peak position
US Adult Alternative Airplay (Billboard)	23
US Adult Pop Airplay (Billboard)	34
