= John Wicks (drummer) =

American drummer, songwriter, and composer

- Born
- Occupations: drummer, songwriter, film composer
- Member of: Fitz and the Tantrums

John Wicks is an American drummer, songwriter, and film composer. He is a co-founder of the band Fitz and the Tantrums and has co-written many of their songs. More Than Just a Dream, the group's 2013 album, included the hit songs "The Walker" and "Out of My League", which each climbed to No. 1 on Billboard's Alternative Songs chart. Fitz and the Tantrums, the band's self-titled studio album, features the hit song "HandClap".

Wicks has also written for and appeared on Bruno Mars' album Doo-Wops & Hooligans and CeeLo Green's The Lady Killer and Heart Blanche albums. In addition, he has recorded and/or played live with such artists as B.o.B, George Clinton, David Byrne, Meshell Ndegeocello, Chocolate Genius, Money Mark, Teddybears (band), RZA, and Mose Allison, among others.

During 2024, Wicks was an instructor at the University of Montana. He also composed the soundtrack to the TV show Under the Banner of Heaven with Pearl Jam bassist Jeff Ament and multi-instrumentalist Josh Klinghoffer. Up until Oct 16, 2022 Wicks continued to tour, compose and record with Fitz and the Tantrums, but left the band after 13+ years to focus on his family, and to "get away from the constant influence of the music business so I can reinvent and upgrade my drumming." Before exiting the band he wrote songs and recorded drums for Let Yourself Free (2022).

Wicks often works with Jeff Ament of Pearl Jam, as a duo group called Deaf Charlie. In addition, Wicks has explored new artistic territories with musical endeavors: Flüffy Bünny blends punk, metal, and humor with bassist Jesse Phillips of St. Paul and The Broken Bones; Punisher is an avant-garde trio featuring saxophonist Loren Stillman and trombonist Cameron Doucette; and his solo project, "Wicks" showcases his improvisational skills with a minimalist drum kit and sampler, putting his own spin on Deantoni Parks' Technoself concept.

== Recordings ==
- Deaf Charlie with Jeff Ament Catastrophic Metamorphic (2023)
- Under the Banner of Heaven (soundtrack with Jeff Ament and Josh Klinghoffer) (2022)

=== Selected collaborations ===
- Bruno Mars Doo-Wops & Hooligans (Elektra Records, 2010)
- Bruno Mars with Cee Lo & B.o.B It's Better If You Don't Understand EP (Elektra Records, 2010)
- Cee Lo Green The Lady Killer (Elektra Records, 2010)
- Cee Lo Green Heart Blanche (Elektra Records, 2015)
- N.A.S.A. The Spirit of Apollo (ANTI-/Epitaph, 2008) – with RZA, David Byrne, Chali 2na, George Clinton
- Iggy Pop with Teddybears "Punk Rocker" Squeak E Clean remix (Atlantic, 2006)
- Chocolate Genius Swan Songs (2010)

=== Album contributions ===
- Fitz and the Tantrums Let Yourself Free (Elektra Records, 2022)
- Fitz and the Tantrums All the Feels (Elektra Records, 2019)
- Fitz and the Tantrums Fitz and the Tantrums (Elektra Records, 2016)
- Fitz and the Tantrums More Than Just a Dream (Elektra Records, 2013)
- Fitz and the Tantrums Pickin' Up the Pieces (Dangerbird Records, 2010)
- Peter Adams Spotlight Floodlight (2010)
- Heather Porcaro The Heartstring Symphony (produced by Tony Berg, 2009)
- Donavon Frankenreiter Pass It Around (Wrasse Records, 2008)

=== Soundtracks ===
- Holy Rollers (First Independent Pictures, 2010)
- Adventures of Power (2010)
- Henry Gummer "Stop the Train" on Julie & Julia (Columbia Pictures, 2009)
- Beautiful Losers (composed by Money Mark, 2007)
- The Kill Seven (surf film with Soccermom, 2006)
- Donavon Frankenreiter "Lovely Day" on Snakes on a Plane soundtrack (New Line Cinema, 2006)

=== Additional credits ===
- Skerik's Syncopated Taint Septet Live at The Triple Door (Royal Potato Family, 2010)
- Skerik's Syncopated Taint Septet Husky (Hyena, 2006) – #1 CMJ Jazz Charts
- Skerik's Syncopated Taint Septet Skerik's Syncopated Taint Septet (Ropeadope, 2003)
- Money Mark Brand New by Tomorrow (Brushfire/Universal, 2007)
- Skip Heller Fakebook (Hyena, 2004)
- Skip Heller The Battle in Seattle (Jewbilee, 2003)
- Alana Sweetwater (2008)
- Jean Mazzei (produced by Ronan Chris Murphy, 2008)
- Whitton (produced by Ronan Chris Murphy, 2008)
- Ashton Zyer (produced by David Rosa, 2007)
- Jessica Fichot Le Chemin (2007)
- Tina Tohsakul (2007)
- Soccermom (2007)
- Swampdweller (Freetone Records, 2005)
- Longboard Magazine DVD (with Dylan Cooper and Heather Porcaro, 2005)
- Spirit Tuck (2004)
- The Hit Shermer, Illinois (Cydonia, 2003)
- Joe Doria The Place to Be (2003)
- Samo Hard G Coach (NCM East, 2001)
- Nikol Kollars Cream of the Drop: Seattle Downbeat (360BPM, 2000)
- Bebop and Destruction Heavy Machinery (My Own Planet, 1998)
- Dan Heck Trio Go to Work! (Trio, 1998)
- Ryan Burns This Is The Ryan Burns Trio (Trio, 1997)
- The Marriott Jazz Quintet (produced by Delfeayo Marsalis, Red Raspus, 1997)
- Robert Strauss "Children" Demo (WEA, 1997)
- Bebop and Destruction Day After (1996)
