= All the Feels (album) =

Studio album by Fitz and the Tantrums
- Released: September 20, 2019
- Genre: Pop
- Length: 52:16
- Label: Elektra
- Producers: Busbee; Ryan Daly; Tommy English; Michael Fitzpatrick; John Hill; Jonas Jeberg; Jake Sinclair; Andrew Wells; Johnny What; Oren Yoel

Fitz and the Tantrums chronology
Fitz and the Tantrums (2016)	All the Feels (2019)	Let Yourself Free (2022)

Singles from All the Feels
- 1. "123456" Released: March 20, 2019; 2. "Don't Ever Let 'Em" Released: April 17, 2019; 3. "I Need Help!" Released: May 2, 2019; 4. "All the Feels" Released: June 28, 2019; 5. "I Just Wanna Shine" Released: July 14, 2019

All the Feels is the fourth studio album by the American neo-soul/pop band Fitz and the Tantrums, their first release since their self-titled album in 2016. It was released on September 20, 2019, through Elektra Records. The digital release of the album has 17 songs, and is the band's longest album to date following Fitz and the Tantrums (2016).

== Background ==
Before the album was released, several singles were dropped over the course of a couple months. The first single, "123456", was released on March 20, 2019. A music video was released on the same day. The next one to be released was "Don't Ever Let 'Em" on April 17, 2019. This song was then followed by "I Need Help!", which was released on May 2, 2019. On June 28, the album was officially announced and able to be pre-ordered, and a song of the same name, "All the Feels", was also released on the same day. The music video "sees Fitz gain a brighter outlook on life after receiving (non-graphic) open-heart surgery." Another song, "I Just Wanna Shine", was released on July 14, 2019. The album was released on September 20.

In an interview, when asked his purpose in making the album, Fitzpatrick said he and the band "[had] been releasing songs every couple weeks." He continued, "[We're] giving people a preview of what it's gonna be like. What's really great is that you get to play it for your fans and right then and there, you kind get a get a sense of what they're feeling and the reaction has been amazing. We worked really hard on this record," he explained. "It's a big record, like 17 songs long, but we wanted to do all the feels." The band actually started with 80 songs and narrowed it down.

Billboard described the album as deep and emotional compared to the band's other works, with some of the "most raw of the songs they've released so far, with a pulsating melody to match the vulnerable - yet uplifting - lyrics like "We dive right into the deep end/ You win, you lose/ You get back up and try again." Another news magazine described the title track "All the Feels" as a song "about wanting more out of a relationship, really trying to feel a connection with somebody," and considered it to be a great summer song.

== Touring ==
The band started their first tour to promote the album with Young the Giant in North America on June 28, 2019, in Columbus, Ohio. It ended on August 16, 2019, in Las Vegas. Another tour after the album's release will pick up on February 28, 2020, in Chicago.

== Track listing ==
All tracks are written by Michael Fitzpatrick, Noelle Scaggs, James King, Jeremy Ruzumna, Joseph Karnes, and John Wicks. Additional writers are included below.

No.	Title	Writer(s)	Producer(s)	Length
1.	"All the Feels"	Morgan Dorr; Stephen Wrabel	Michael Fitzpatrick	3:16
2.	"123456"	Dorr; Wrabel; Kristine Flaherty; Thomas Schlieter	Tommy English; John Hill	3:05
3.	"I Just Wanna Shine"	Nicholas Long	Jake Sinclair	3:27
4.	"Ain't Nobody But Me"	Kevin Bard; Oren Yoel	Fitzpatrick; Yoel^{[c]}	2:45
5.	"I Need Help!"	Ammar Malik; Andrew Wells	Wells	3:08
6.	"Don't Ever Let Em"	Andrew Jackson; Schlieter	Fitzpatrick; English; Rob Cohen^{[v]}	2:42
7.	"Basement"	Amy Allen; Michael Busbee; Ryan Daly	Busbee; Daly	2:58
8.	"Ready or Not"	James Abrahart; Nicholas Ruth	Fitzpatrick; Ruth^{[c]}; Federico Vindver^{[a]}; Angel Lopez^{[a]}	3:39
9.	"OCD"	Long; Schlieter	English	2:52
10.	"SuperMagik"	Samuel Hollander	Jonas Jeberg	3:02
11.	"Belladonna"	Nathaniel Cyphert; Yoel	Yoel	2:55
12.	"Stop"	Cyphert; Yoel	Yoel	3:24
13.	"Dark Days"	Johnny What	Johnny What; Fitzpatrick^{[c]}	3:07
14.	"Hands Up"	Asia Whiteacre; Schlieter	English	3:13
15.	"Kiss the Sky"		Fitzpatrick	3:09
16.	"Maybe Yes"	Jason Suwito; Flaherty	Fitzpatrick	2:41
17.	"Livin' for the Weekend"	Neil Ormandy; Jeberg	Jeberg	2:55
Total length:				52:16

Note

- "Belladonna", "Kiss the Sky", and "Livin' for the Weekend" are only included on the digital version of the album. The physical releases all have "Ready or Not" as the final track.
- ^{^[c]} signifies a co-producer
- ^{^[a]} signifies an additional producer
- ^{^[v]} signifies a vocal producer

== Personnel ==
Fitz and the Tantrums

- Michael Fitzpatrick – vocals (all tracks), keyboards (tracks 1, 2, 4, 6, 16), drum programming (1), background vocals (2), drums (4, 16)
- Noelle Scaggs – vocals (all tracks), background vocals (2)
- James King – horn (1–3, 5), background vocals (2), saxophone (4, 8, 12, 13, 15, 17), baritone saxophone (7, 9, 11, 12, 14), keyboards (8, 12, 13, 15, 16), percussion (8, 12, 13, 15, 16), alto saxophone (10, 14, 16), tenor saxophone (10–12, 14, 16)
- Joseph Karnes – bass guitar (1–3, 5, 8, 11, 13–17), background vocals (2)
- Jeremy Ruzumna – keyboards (1–3, 5, 7–9, 11–17), background vocals (2), synthesizer (11)
- John Wicks – drums (1–3, 5, 7–9, 11–17), background vocals (2), percussion (6)

Additional musicians

- Wrabel – additional vocals (1)
- Isaiah Gage – cello (1)
- Ethan Bearman – horn (1), French horn (10, 17)
- Jordan Katz – horn (1, 5), trumpet (10–12, 17), piccolo trumpet (11, 12), trombone (11, 12)
- James Miller – horn (1), trombone (10, 17)
- Ron Blake – horn (1)
- Stephen "Johan" Feigenbaum – strings (1)
- Yasmeen Al-Mazeedi – violin (1)
- Tommy English – keyboards (2, 6), programming (2, 9, 14), background vocals (2); drum programming, guitar (6)
- K.Flay – background vocals (2, 16)
- Rilo Karnes – background vocals (2)
- Theo Fitzpatrick – background vocals (2)
- Ruby Wicks – background vocals (2)
- Betty Wicks – background vocals (2)
- Raphael Ruzumna – background vocals (2)
- Lisa Nupoff – background vocals (2)
- Aaron Glas – background vocals (2)
- Julian King – background vocals (2)
- John Hill – keyboards, programming (2)
- Nick Long – guitar (3)
- Oren Yoel – guitar, keyboards (4, 11, 12); drums (4); programming, synthesizer (11, 12); bass guitar (12)
- Andrew Wells – background vocals, drums, guitar, percussion (5)
- Ammar Malik – background vocals (5)
- Busbee – bass guitar, keyboards, programming (7)
- Ryan Daly – guitar, keyboards, programming (7)
- Nick Ruth – guitar (8, 9); acoustic guitar, background vocals (8)
- Jonas Jeberg – bass guitar, drums, keyboards (10, 17)
- Devon Taylor – sousaphone (10, 17)
- David Ralicke – piccolo trumpet, trombone, trumpet (11, 12)
- Johnny What – bass guitar, drums, synthesizer (13)
- Jason Suwito – drums, keyboards (16)

Technical

- Emerson Mancini – mastering
- Manny Marroquin – mixing (1–3, 5, 7–9, 11–17)
- Justin Long – mixing (6), engineering (4, 6, 8, 9, 14, 16), additional engineering (1)
- Chris Galland – mix engineering (7–9, 12–16)
- Carlos de la Garza – engineering (1, 4, 6–8, 16)
- Rob Cohen – engineering (2), editing (1, 8, 16)
- Blake Mares – engineering (2)
- Suzy Chin – engineering (3)
- Andrew Wells – engineering (5)
- Jon Yeston – engineering (5)
- Busbee – engineering (7)
- Ryan Daly – engineering (7)
- Ryan Hewitt – engineering (10, 17)
- Doron Dina – engineering (11, 12)
- Johnny What – engineering (13)
- Jeremy Simoneaux – engineering assistance (1, 2, 5)
- Ryan Dulude – engineering assistance (1, 2, 5)
- Rachel White – engineering assistance (3)
- Nick Rives – engineering assistance (6–8, 11, 12)
- Collin Kadlec – engineering assistance (6, 8, 9, 14)
- Jeff Fitzpatrick – engineering assistance (17)

Artwork

- Tyler Spangler – art direction
- Nada Taha – art direction
- Luke Dickey – photography
