= Let Yourself Free =

2022 album by Fitz and the Tantrums

Studio album by Fitz and the Tantrums
- Released: November 11, 2022
- Studio: Wax Ltd; Henson; Studio America
- Length: 32:09
- Label: Elektra
- Producer: Ryan Daly; Andrew DeRoberts; Sean Fischer; Fitz; Matthew Koma; Ryan Lewis; Jeremy Ruzumna; Jared Scharff; Shiben; John Wicks

Fitz and the Tantrums chronology
All the Feels (2019)	Let Yourself Free (2022)	Perfect Holiday (2023)

Singles from Let Yourself Free
- 1. "Sway" Released: June 10, 2022

Let Yourself Free is the fifth studio album by American band Fitz and the Tantrums. It was released on November 11, 2022, by Elektra Records. A deluxe edition of the album with six extra songs was released on June 23, 2023. It is their first album in three years since 2019's All the Feels (2019).

== Background ==
Lead vocalist Michael Fitzpatrick explained he and the band wanted to be "more judicious" with the writing process by writing only "two or three [songs] a week and really think about it and sit with them." Fifty songs were written in consideration for the record, which were eventually narrowed down to the twelve songs that appear on the final album.

The band intended for the album to nod back to their early influences, with songs like "Silver Platter" and "Steppin' on Me" recalling their debut album Pickin' Up the Pieces (2010).

== Singles ==
The album was supported by two singles. The lead single, "Sway", was released on June 10, 2022 with a music video released the same day. The second single, "Moneymaker", was released on September 27, 2022, simultaneously with the announcement of Let Yourself Free.

== Critical reception ==
Writing for AllMusic, Matt Collar rated Let Yourself Free four out of five stars, noting that it "hold[s] on to all of that mainstream pop savvy while still managing to throw things back to [the band's] humble D.I.Y. R&B beginnings."

== Track listing ==
All tracks are written by Noelle Scaggs, Fitz, Jeremy Ruzumna, Joseph Karnes, John Wicks, and James King, with additional writers noted below.

Let Yourself Free track listing
No.	Title	Writer(s)	Producer(s)	Length
1.	"Good Intentions"	Malia Civetz; Ryan Daly	Daly; Fitz	2:28
2.	"Heaven"	Daly; Nolan Sipe; Joe Kirkland	Daly; Fitz	2:44
3.	"Sway"	Daly; Sean Van Vleet; Sipe	Daly; Fitz	2:16
4.	"Silver Platter"	Shiben; Mick Coogan	Daly; Shiben; Fitz	2:35
5.	"Let Yourself Free"		Daly; Fitz; John Wicks	2:19
6.	"Moneymaker"	Daly; Sam DeRosa; Kirkland	Daly; Fitz	2:17
7.	"Ahhhh"	Andrew DeRoberts; Sipe	Daly; DeRoberts	2:45
8.	"Good Nights"	Ryan Lewis; Hayley Gene Penner; Brian Wall	Lewis	3:25
9.	"Big Love"		Daly; Jared Scharff; Jeremy Ruzumna	2:35
10.	"Is It Love"	Skyler Stonestreet	Daly; Fitz; Wicks	2:25
11.	"Steppin' on Me"	DeRosa; Sean Fischer	Daly; Fischer; Fitz	2:48
12.	"Someday"	Daly; Matthew Koma	Koma	3:32
Total length:				32:09

Let Yourself Free deluxe edition bonus tracks
No.	Title	Writer(s)	Producer(s)	Length
13.	"24"	Coogan; Daly	Daly; Fitz	2:36
14.	"Get on Up"	Coogan; Daly	Daly; Coogan; Fitz	2:50
15.	"So What"	Daly; Josh Ocean; Van Vleet	Daly; Fitz; Nvdes	2:32
16.	"Fancy"	Coogan; Daly; Shiben; Van Vleet	Daly; Shiben; Fitz	3:05
17.	"On My Way"	Daly; DeReosa; Van Vleet	Daly; Fitz; Shiben	2:41
18.	"Feeling Good"	Daly; Ocean; Van Vleet	Daly; Fitz; Nvdes	2:22
Total length:				48:15

== Personnel ==
Fitz and the Tantrums

- Fitz – vocals
- Noelle Scaggs – vocals, tambourine
- James King – alto saxophone, tenor saxophone, baritone saxophone, background vocals
- Jeremy Ruzumna – keyboards, background vocals
- Joseph Karnes – bass, background vocals
- John Wicks – drums, background vocals

Additional contributors

- Emerson Mancini (Note: Mancini, who publicly came out as a trans man in January 2023, is credited by his deadname.) – mastering
- Adam Hawkins – mixing
- Reddah Haddioul – engineering (tracks 1–7, 9–18)
- Brian Well – engineering (track 8)
- Ryan Lewis – engineering (track 8)
- Henry Lunetta – mixing assistance
- Collin Kadlec – engineering assistance (track 8)
- Aaron Glas – session coordination (all tracks); clarinet, bass clarinet (track 8)
- Jerry Fitzgerald – backline technician
- Ron Blake – trumpet, flugelhorn (tracks 1, 3, 4, 6)
- Francisco Torres – trombone, bass trombone (tracks 1, 3, 4, 6)
- Mark Robert Obriski – art direction, design
- Jimmy Fontaine – cover photograph
- Lindsey Byrnes – outside tray band photography
- Anna Lee – collage photography
