= Walk Hard: The Dewey Cox Story (soundtrack) =

2007 film soundtrack album

Walk Hard: The Dewey Cox Story – Original Motion Picture Soundtrack

Soundtrack album to Walk Hard: The Dewey Cox Story by John C. Reilly (credited to Dewey Cox)
- Released: October 30, 2007
- Genres: Comedy rock; rockabilly; rock and roll; folk; country; psychedelic pop; countrypolitan; disco
- Label: Columbia
- Producers: Judd Apatow (exec.); John C. Reilly (exec); Michael Andrews; Jake Kasdan

John C. Reilly (credited to Dewey Cox) chronology
Walk Hard: The Dewey Cox Story – Original Motion Picture Soundtrack (2007)	An Almost Christmas Story (2024)

Professional ratings
Review scores
Source	Rating
Allmusic	4.5/5 stars

Walk Hard: The Dewey Cox Story – Original Motion Picture Soundtrack is the soundtrack to the 2007 film Walk Hard: The Dewey Cox Story.

== Production ==
It was almost like a Manhattan Project for songwriters," says Bern. "It was the most fun thing I've ever done.

— Dan Bern, 2007

The cast and crew recorded 40 original songs; 33 are featured in the movie. Singer-songwriter Dan Bern and Mike Viola (of the Candy Butchers) wrote most of the film's songs, including "There's a Change A' Happenin'", "The Mulatto Song" and "Hole in My Pants". Marshall Crenshaw wrote the title tune and Van Dyke Parks penned one of the 1960-styled psychedelic jams, "Black Sheep".

Singer Angela Correa provides the voice of Darlene Madison Cox (played in the film by actress Jenna Fischer), as she did in the feature film.

A number of critics noted the unusually high quality of many of the individual songs on the soundtrack, how well they reflected the styles and times they were attempting to spoof, and how well they stood on their own as quality compositions. The soundtrack was nominated for both a Grammy and Golden Globe Award and was nominated and won the Sierra Award for Best Song in a Motion Picture from the Las Vegas Film Critics Society.

== Track listing ==
All tracks performed by John C. Reilly, except where noted. All tracks produced by Michael Andrews and Jake Kasdan, and mixed by Bryan Cook and Dan Long.

Walk Hard: The Dewey Cox Story (soundtrack) track listing
No.	Title	Writer(s)	Length
1.	"Walk Hard"	Jake Kasdan; John C. Reilly; Judd Apatow; Marshall Crenshaw	2:47
2.	"Take My Hand"	Antonio Ortiz; Kasdan; Apatow	2:31
3.	"(Mama) You Got to Love Your Negro Man"	Robert Walter; Reilly; Kasdan; Apatow; Michael Andrews	2:44
4.	"A Life Without You (Is No Life at All)"	Mike Viola	2:19
5.	"Let's Duet" (performed by Reilly and Angela Correa)	Charlie Wadhams; Benji Hughes	3:32
6.	"Darling"	Viola; Reilly	2:35
7.	"(I Hate You) Big Daddy"	Viola	1:47
8.	"Guilty as Charged"	Wadhams; Gus Seyffert	2:51
9.	"Dear Mr. President"	Dan Bern; Viola	2:45
10.	"Let Me Hold You (Little Man)"	Bern; Viola; Manish Raval	1:52
11.	"Royal Jelly"	Bern	4:26
12.	"Black Sheep"	Andrews; Van Dyke Parks	3:44
13.	"Starman"	David Bowie	3:40
14.	"Beautiful Ride"	Bern; Viola	3:43
15.	"(Have You Heard the News) Dewey Cox Died"	Bern	2:28
Total length:			43:51

=== iTunes exclusive extended edition ===
1. "Take My Hand" (Reilly)
2. "Jump Little Children" (Craig Robinson)
3. "(Mama) You Got to Love Your Negro Man" (Reilly)
4. "That's Amore" (Reilly)
5. "Walk Hard" (Reilly)
6. "A Life Without You (Is No Life At All)" (Reilly)
7. "(I Hate You) Big Daddy" (Reilly)
8. "Walk Hard (Punk Version)" (Reilly)
9. "Let's Duet" (Reilly & Angela Correa)
10. "Darling" (Reilly)
11. "Guilty As Charged" (Reilly)
12. "There's a Change A' Happening (I Can Feel It)" (Reilly)
13. "Dear Mr. President" (Reilly)
14. "Hey Mr. Old Guy" (Reilly)
15. "Ladies First" (Reilly)
16. "The Mulatto Song" (Reilly)
17. "Let Me Hold You (Little Man)" (Reilly)
18. "Hole In My Pants" (Reilly)
19. "Royal Jelly" (Reilly)
20. "Farmer Glickstein" (Reilly)
21. "Black Sheep" (Reilly)
22. "Walk Hard (70's TV Show Theme)" (Reilly)
23. "Who Wants to Party" (Reilly)
24. "Weeping On the Inside" (Reilly)
25. "Billy Don't Be a Hero" (Reilly)
26. "Walk Hard (All-Star Version)" (Ghostface Killah, Lyle Lovett, Jewel Kilcher, Jackson Browne)
27. "Beautiful Ride" (Reilly)
28. "(Have You Heard the News) Dewey Cox Died" (Reilly)
29. "Cut My Brother In Half Blues" (Reilly)
30. "(You Make Me So) Hard" (Jacques Slade)
- The song "Starman" is not available on the iTunes Exclusive Extended Edition of the album.

== Release history ==
- (France) October 30, 2007
- (Greece) November 8, 2007
- (Australia) November 5, 2007
- (Germany) (Spain) December 3, 2007
- (United States) (Canada) December 4, 2007
- (South Africa) January 7, 2008
- (Italy) (Japan) January 16, 2008
- (Brazil) March 6, 2008
- (United Kingdom) February 17, 2008
- (Fiji) March 7, 2008
- (Mexico) (North Korea) April 9, 2008
- (Republic of Ireland) April 17, 2008
- (Cuba) (Puerto Rico) May 19, 2008
