= Fitz and the Tantrums (album) =

Studio album by Fitz and the Tantrums
- Released: June 10, 2016
- Genre: Pop
- Length: 36:23
- Label: Elektra
- Producers: Jesse Shatkin; Ricky Reed; Michael Fitzpatrick; Joel Little

Fitz and the Tantrums chronology
| More Than Just a Dream (2013) | Fitz and the Tantrums (2016) | All the Feels (2019) |

Singles from Fitz and the Tantrums
- 1. "HandClap" Released: March 25, 2016; 2. "Roll Up" Released: September 20, 2016; 3. "Fool" Released: 2017

Fitz and the Tantrums is the third studio album by American indie pop and neo soul group Fitz and the Tantrums. It was released on June 10, 2016 by Elektra Records.

== Critical reception ==
Professional ratings
Aggregate scores
| Source | Rating |
|---|---|
| Metacritic | 56/100 |
Review scores
| Source | Rating |
| AllMusic | 4/5 stars |
| Consequence of Sound | D |
| The Courier-Journal | 3/4 stars |
| Newsday | B+ |
| Popmatters | 4/10 stars |
| Rolling Stone | 2/5 stars |

Fitz and the Tantrums received mixed reviews from critics. At Metacritic, which assigns a normalized rating out of 100 to reviews from mainstream publications, the album received an average score of 56, which indicates "mixed or average reviews" based on 7 reviews. Isaac Feldberg from the Boston Globe calls it the band's "glossiest record yet", with a "brassy, retro-glam aesthetic with a commercial-minded agenda", going on to say, "on ballads (...) the band sounds more lost, mired in lackluster lyrics and mundane melodies." The 405 gave it a score of 20/100 and wrote, "Each and every track on this album is so jam-packed with garbage pop flourishes that it can get exhausting."

== Track listing ==
All tracks are written by Michael Fitzpatrick, Noelle Scaggs, James King, Jeremy Ruzumna, Joseph Karnes, and John Wicks. Additional writers are included below.

| No. | Title | Writer(s) | Producer(s) | Length |
|---|---|---|---|---|
| 1. | "HandClap" | Eric Frederic; Sam Hollander | Ricky Reed | 3:13 |
| 2. | "Complicated" | Sean Foreman; Jesse Shatkin | Shatkin | 3:11 |
| 3. | "Burn It Down" | | Shatkin | 3:21 |
| 4. | "Roll Up" | Hollander; Grant Michaels | Shatkin | 3:38 |
| 5. | "Tricky" | Ross Golan; Shatkin | Shatkin | 3:27 |
| 6. | "Fadeback" | Kevin Bard | Michael Fitzpatrick | 3:00 |
| 7. | "Run It" | Hollander | Shatkin | 3:29 |
| 8. | "Get Right Back" | Hollander | Shatkin | 3:44 |
| 9. | "Do What You Want" | Fransisca Hall; Joel Little | Little | 3:12 |
| 10. | "Walking Target" | Steve Bays; Parker Bossley | Shatkin | 2:36 |
| 11. | "A Place for Us" | Hall | Shatkin | 3:32 |
| Total length: | | | | 36:23 |

Reissue bonus track
| No. | Title | Writer(s) | Producer(s) | Length |
|---|---|---|---|---|
| 1. | "Fool" | Nathan Cunningham; Sean Douglas; Talay Riley; Marc Sibley | Douglas; Riley; Space Primates | 3:09 |
| Total length: | | | | 39:32 |

== Personnel ==
Adapted from AllMusic.

Fitz and the Tantrums

- Michael Fitzpatrick – vocals, engineering
- Noelle Scaggs – vocals, tambourine
- James King – saxophone
- Joseph Karnes – bass guitar, engineering
- Jeremy Ruzumna – keyboards
- John Wicks – drums, percussion, engineering

Additional musicians

- Steve Bays – keyboards, vocals
- Parker Bossley – guitar, vocals
- Sean Foreman – vocals
- Ross Golan – vocals
- Fran Hall – vocals
- Jordan Katz – piccolo trumpet, trombone, trumpet
- Grant Michaels – drum programming, acoustic guitar, keyboards
- Ricky Reed – bass, guitar, keyboards, producer, programming

Artwork

- Joseph Cultice – photography
- Doug Gledhill – art direction, design
- Ryan McCann – art direction, design
- Sam Riback – A&R
- Craig Kallman – A&R
- Jeff Nicholas – design, layout

Production

- Miles Comaskey – mixing assistant
- Robin Florent – mixing assistant
- Chris Galland – mixing assistant, mixing engineer
- Ryan Gilligan – engineer
- Aaron Glas – engineer
- Jeff Jackson – mixing assistant
- Joel Little – composer, engineer, producer
- Emerson Mancini – mastering
- Manny Marroquin – mixing
- Tony Maserati – mixing
- Ryan "Shmedly" Maynes – engineer
- Ike Schultz – mixing assistant
- David Schwerkolt – assistant engineer
- Tyler Scott – mixing assistant

== Charts ==
| Chart (2016) | Peak position |
|---|---|
| Canadian Albums (Billboard) | 43 |
| US Billboard 200 | 17 |
| US Top Alternative Albums (Billboard) | 4 |
| US Top Rock Albums (Billboard) | 6 |

== Certifications ==
Certifications and sales for Fitz and the Tantrums
| Region | Certification | Certified units/sales |
|---|---|---|
| United States (RIAA) | Gold | 500,000^{‡} |
^{‡} Sales+streaming figures based on certification alone.
