= HandClap =

- HandClap (Remixes, Pt. 1) cover

Single by Fitz and the Tantrums

from the album Fitz and the Tantrums
- Released: March 25, 2016
- Recorded: 2016
- Studio: Elysian Park
- Genre: Indie pop; dance-pop
- Length: 3:12
- Label: Elektra
- Songwriters: Fitz and the Tantrums; Eric Frederic; Sam Hollander
- Producer: Ricky Reed

Fitz and the Tantrums singles chronology
"Fools Gold" (2014)	"HandClap" (2016)	"Roll Up" (2016)

Music video
- "HandClap" on YouTube

"HandClap" is a song recorded by American indie pop band Fitz and the Tantrums. The song was released as the lead single from their self-titled album Fitz and the Tantrums on March 25, 2016, through Elektra Records. It is their highest-charting song on the Billboard Hot 100, peaking at number 53. The song was also included in Playground Games's Forza Horizon 3 soundtrack and Just Dance Unlimited for Just Dance 2017. A rendition of the song was also performed on the South Korean-Japanese survival show Produce 48 in 2018. Since its release, the song has gained popularity from its usage during sporting events.

== Track listing ==
Remixes Pt. 1
No.	Title	Length
1.	"HandClap" (Dave Audé Remix)	3:12
2.	"HandClap" (Willy Joy Remix)	3:12
3.	"HandClap" (Myles Travitz Remix)	3:12
4.	"HandClap" (Paul Damixie Remix)	3:12
Total length:		15:30

== Charts ==
=== Weekly charts ===
Weekly chart performance
Chart (2016–2020)	Peak position
Austria (Ö3 Austria Top 40)	55
Canada Hot 100 (Billboard)	78
Canada Hot AC (Billboard)	31
Canada Rock (Billboard)	16
CIS Airplay (TopHit)	67
Germany (GfK)	59
Japan Hot 100 (Billboard)	19
Russia Airplay (TopHit)	65
South Korea (Gaon)	9
South Korea International Digital (Gaon)	1
Ukraine Airplay (TopHit)	131
US Billboard Hot 100	53
US Adult Contemporary (Billboard)	22
US Adult Pop Airplay (Billboard)	5
US Hot Rock & Alternative Songs (Billboard)	2
US Pop Airplay (Billboard)	29
US Rock & Alternative Airplay (Billboard)	7

=== Year-end charts ===
Chart (2016)	Position
US Adult Top 40 (Billboard)	44
US Hot Rock Songs (Billboard)	13
US Rock Airplay (Billboard)	18
Chart (2017)	Position
US Adult Top 40 (Billboard)	35
US Hot Rock Songs (Billboard)	10
Chart (2018)	Position
South Korea (Gaon)	15
Chart (2020)	Position
Japan (Japan Hot 100)	95
Japan Hot Overseas (Billboard Japan)	3

== Certifications ==
Region	Certification	Certified units/sales
Australia (ARIA)	Platinum	70,000^{‡}
Austria (IFPI Austria)	Gold	15,000^{‡}
Canada (Music Canada)	5× Platinum	400,000^{‡}
Germany (BVMI)	Gold	200,000^{‡}
New Zealand (RMNZ)	Gold	15,000^{‡}
Poland (ZPAV)	Gold	25,000^{‡}
United Kingdom (BPI)	Silver	200,000^{‡}
United States (RIAA)	4× Platinum	4,000,000^{‡}
^{‡} Sales+streaming figures based on certification alone.
