= Noelle Scaggs =

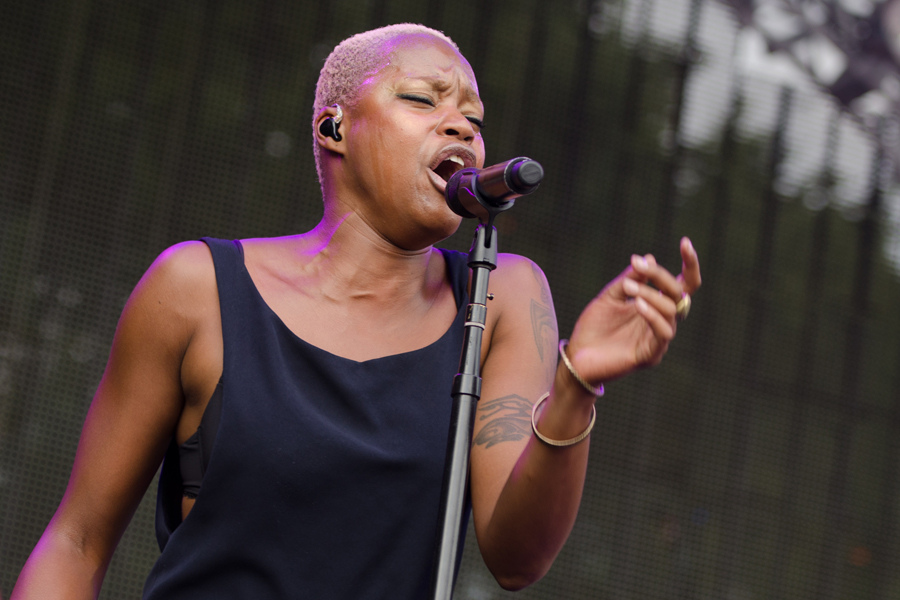
- Scaggs singing with Fitz and the Tantrums at Firefly Music Festival 2012

Background information
- Born: Noelle Scaggs; October 8, 1979 (age 47); Denver, Colorado, U.S.
- Origin: South Pasadena, California, U.S.
- Genres: Pop, soul, R&B
- Occupations: Musician, singer-songwriter
- Instruments: Vocals, piano, percussion
- Years active: 2000–present
- Label: Elektra
- Website: noellescaggs.com

Noelle Scaggs (born October 8, 1979) is an American musician and singer-songwriter from Los Angeles, known as the co-lead singer of the pop group Fitz and the Tantrums. Scaggs has also had numerous collaborations with the Black Eyed Peas, Dilated Peoples, Quantic, Mayer Hawthorne, and Damian Marley.

In 2008, she became a co-lead singer of the indie pop and neo-soul band Fitz and the Tantrums, and is featured on their 2010 album Pickin' Up the Pieces, which hit No. 1 on the Billboard Heatseekers chart. She has toured extensively with the band and performed on shows such as Jimmy Kimmel Live!, Conan, The Tonight Show with Jay Leno, Ellen, GMA, The Tonight Show Starring Jimmy Fallon, and The Late Late Show with James Corden.

She has been critically acclaimed for her "powerhouse vocals" and charismatic on-stage presence.

== Early life ==
Scaggs was born on October 8, 1979, in Denver, Colorado. Her father was a DJ and Scaggs was exposed to his vinyl collection at a young age, including Parliament, Teena Marie, and The Pointer Sisters. She also listened to her parents play artists such as Marvin Gaye and The Temptations during house parties, and was influenced as a young singer by the music of Tina Turner.

Early on, Scaggs would perform for friends and family, and at around 9 years of age, became more seriously interested in singing. In elementary school she began practicing daily and signed herself up for all available talent shows. According to Scaggs, "I was one of those kids who had friends but got picked on a lot...I felt like I needed an outlet. For me, that outlet was music." Except for a year of vocal training in high school, she was self-taught and only considered becoming a professional musician as she approached graduation from South Pasadena High School.

== Music career ==
=== Collaborations ===
After high school Scaggs began working as both a professional songwriter and vocalist. Early on she faced financial hurdles, as well as finding the right producers. As a songwriter, Scaggs has referenced creative influences as diverse as Radiohead and The Bird and the Bee.

Her first major label appearance was in 2000, as lead vocalist on the track "If There Be Pain" on the Interscope compilation project The Rose That Grew from Concrete. In 2001 she contributed vocals to Expansion Team by Dilated Peoples, and in 2003 contributed background vocals to the Elephunk LP by The Black Eyed Peas and Must B 21 by will.i.am.

In 2003 she released her first 12" LP, The Craft, featuring hip-hop trio Dilated Peoples.

She was a primary artist in 2006 on An Announcement to Answer by Quantic, and has since worked as a composer, songwriter, or vocalist with artists such as Orgone, Mayer Hawthorne, The Quantic Soul Orchestra, Guilty Simpson, Koushik, and Evidence. She also worked on Damian Marley's 2010 release with rapper Nas.

In July 2008 she performed in four shows on Scion A/V's "Live Metro" tour featuring hardcore rap duo M.O.P. Funk band Connie Price and the Keystones and saxophonist James King (later of Fitz and the Tantrums), provided backing.

She has also sung backup for Miley Cyrus and modeled in an art piece for Kanye West. In 2008 she hosted the VMA's Nappy Boy TV with T-Pain. She has contributed to a number of film soundtracks as a singer and songwriter, including Walk Hard: The Dewey Cox Story (in which she was also an uncredited actress) and The Nanny Diaries with Scarlett Johansson. She acted as a backup singer in Be Cool with John Travolta.

=== The Rebirth ===
Scaggs soon joined as front-woman and songwriter for The Rebirth, a Los Angeles soul band. In 2005 The Rebirth released their first album This Journey In on independent label Kajmere Sound. She wrote the track "Stray Away" and a number of other songs on their LP, co-writing with band leader Carlos Guiaco.

The first single, "This Journey In", hit the top 5 of playlists throughout Europe and Japan, and attracted the attention of DJs such as BBC Radio 1's Gilles Peterson, King Britt of the group Digable Planets, and Norman Jay MBE. Scaggs toured with the band for ten years before taking two years off from music.

=== Fitz and the Tantrums ===
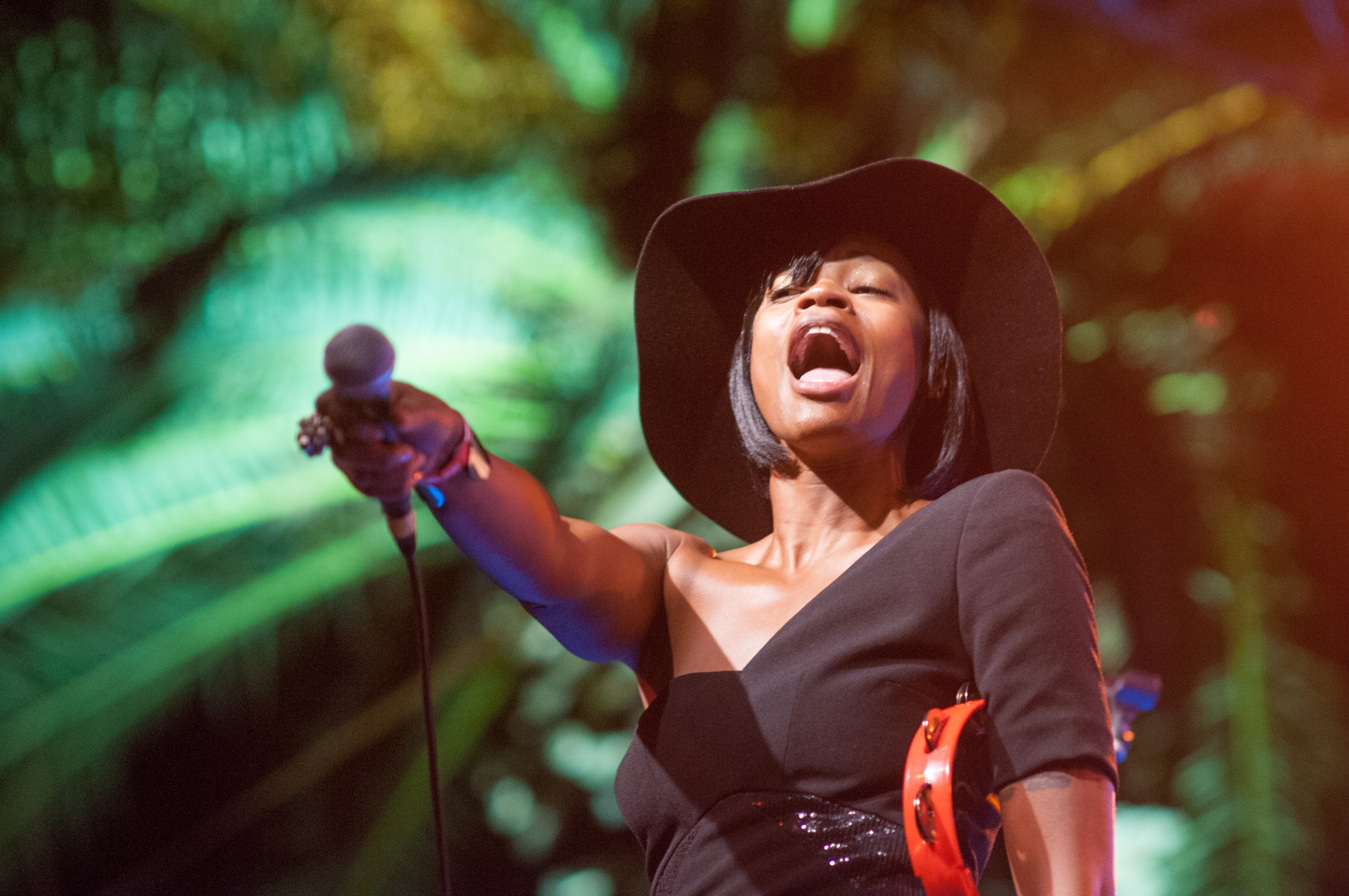
Scaggs at a 2010 performance in San Diego

In December 2008 she joined the Los Angeles soul/pop band Fitz and the Tantrums for a rehearsal after being recommended to band leader Michael Fitzpatrick by saxophone player James King. According to Scaggs, "When I first heard the project I was really attracted to the sound. It was something that wasn't really familiar in the spectrum of not being exactly Motown or something from the '80s."

They performed for the first time a week later at Hollywood's Hotel Café, and she decided to remain with the band as a vocalist, songwriter, and lyricist. They released their debut EP Songs for a Breakup, Vol. 1 in August 2009, and the tracks soon received airplay on public radio station KCRW in Los Angeles.

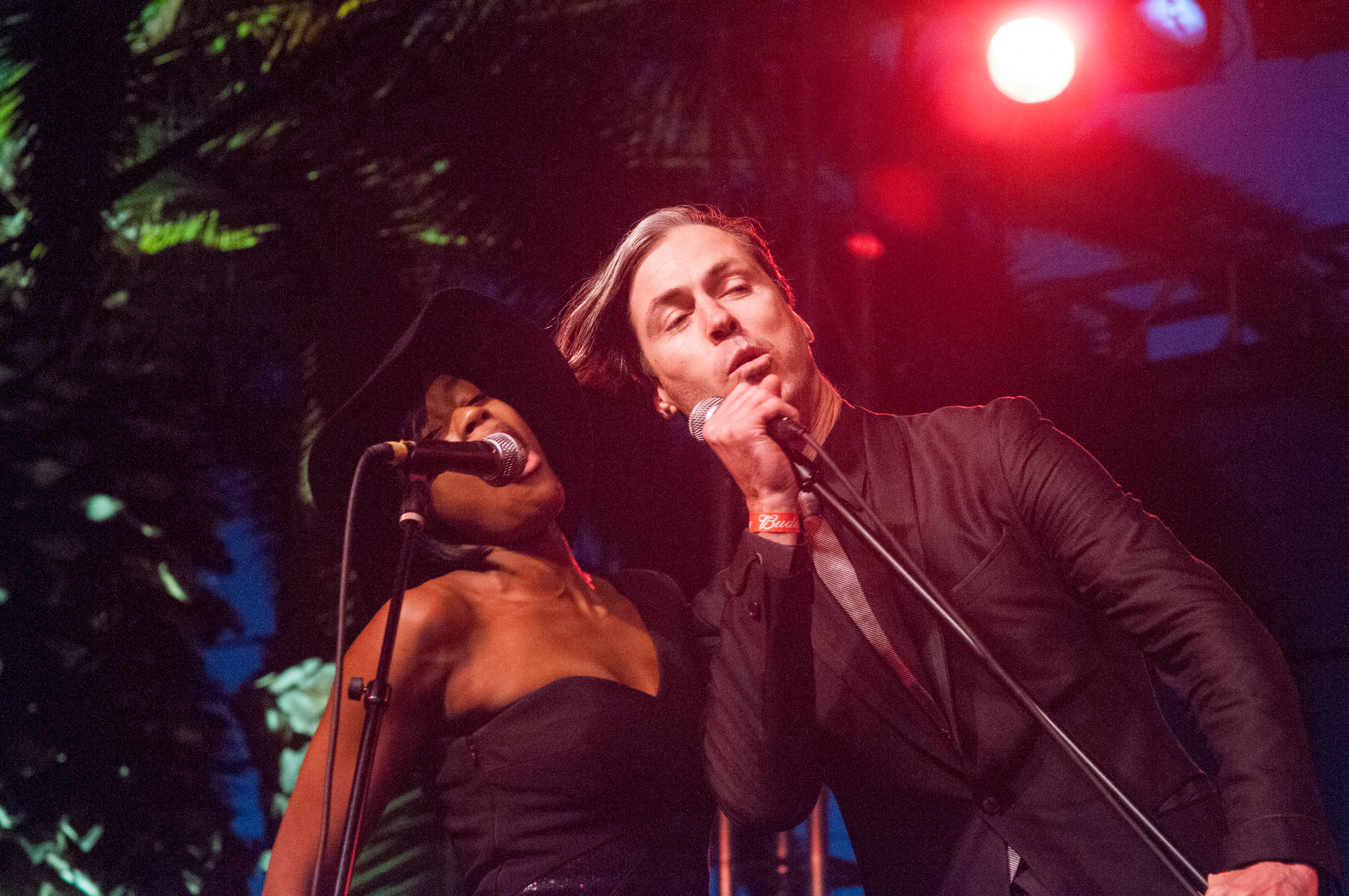
Michael Fitzpatrick and Scaggs

Six months after their first performance they had slots at Lollapalooza and Telluride Blues & Brews. In late 2009 they toured with Hepcat, Flogging Molly, and opened eight concerts for Maroon 5. The band signed to Dangerbird Records in April 2010, and Scaggs has since appeared with the band on Jimmy Kimmel Live!, Conan and The Tonight Show with Jay Leno.

Their first full-length album, Pickin' Up the Pieces was released on August 24, 2010. It received critical acclaim and reached No. 1 on the Billboard Heatseekers chart, 140 on the Billboard 200, and 18 on the Independent Albums chart.

They were called by Vogue Magazine the "Hardest Working Band of 2011," and "Artist to Watch" in Rolling Stone. Also according to Rolling Stone, the band "throws a sparkling pop gloss on a familiar Motown sound thanks in large part to the powerhouse vocals of sultry singer Noelle Scaggs."

== Discography ==
=== Singles ===
- 2026: Money Fame Love
- 2025: Bless The DJ
- 2025: Diamonds On The Floor
- 2003: The Craft (featuring Dilated Peoples)
- 2018: Great For You (featuring BRÅVES)

=== The Rebirth ===
Studio albums

- 2006: This Journey In (Vocals, composer)

=== Fitz and the Tantrums ===
Studio albums

- 2009: Songs for a Breakup, Vol. 1 EP (Composer, vocals)
- 2010: Santa Stole My Lady EP (Composer, vocals)
- 2010: Pickin' Up the Pieces (Composer, vocals)
- 2013: More Than Just A Dream (Composer, vocals, keyboards)
- 2016: Fitz and the Tantrums (Composer, vocals)
- 2019: All the Feels (Composer, vocals)
- 2022: Let Yourself Free (Composer, vocals)

=== Collaborations ===
Studio albums

- 2000: The Rose That Grew from Concrete (Vocals)
- 2000: Bridging the Gap by The Black Eyed Peas (Background vocals)
- 2001: Expansion Team by Dilated Peoples (Vocals)
- 2003: Elephunk by The Black Eyed Peas (Background vocals)
- 2003: Must B 21: Soundtrack to Get Things Started by will.i.am (Background vocals)
- 2004: Crescent Moon by Lunar Heights (Primary artist, vocals)
- 2004: The Arrival by Cutthroat Dymond Cutz Family (Primary artist, vocals)
- 2005: 100% Black Novenoe Volument DVD (Background vocals)
- 2005: Grammy Nominees 2005 (Background vocals)
- 2005: Push Comes to Shove by MED (Composer)
- 2005: Monkey Business by The Black Eyed Peas (Background Vocals)
- 2005: Soul Divas (Wagram) (Featured artist)
- 2006: An Announcement to Answer by Quantic (Composer, primary artist, vocals)
- 2006: Authentic Vintage by Jern Eye (Vocals)
- 2007: Rough Guide to Latin Funk (Composer)
- 2007: Shapes 07:01 (Composer)
- 2007: Walk Hard: The Dewey Cox Story (Musician, vocals)
- 2007: The Killion Floor by Orgone (Lyricist, primary artist, vocals)
- 2007: The Weatherman LP by Evidence (Choir, vocals)
- 2007: Tropidelico by The Quantic Soul Orchestra (Primary artist, vocals)
- 2008: Jungle Struttin' by The Lions (Vocals)
- 2008: Ode to the Ghetto by Guilty Simpson (Vocals)
- 2008: Out My Window by Koushik (Vocals)
- 2008: The Layover EP by Evidence (Vocals)
- 2009: The Connection, Vol. 1 by Evidence (Featured artist, vocals)
- 2010: Distant Relatives by Damian "Junior Gong" Marley (Background vocals)
- 2010: Fairfax Avenue by Roy Jay (Background vocals)
- 2010: For What You've Lost by Raashan Ahmad (Featured artist)
- 2011: Cats and Dogs by Evidence (Vocals)
- 2011: How Do You Do by Mayer Hawthorne (Vocals)
- 2011: Extra Playful by John Cale (Background vocals)

=== Singles ===
- "Let's Do It Again"/"Cherry Pie" (Featured artist, composer)

== Filmography ==
- 2005: Be Cool (Backup singer)
- 2006: Where is Love Waiting (Singer)
