= Pickin' Up the Pieces (Fitz and the Tantrums album) =

Studio album by Fitz and the Tantrums
- Released: August 24, 2010
- Studio: Culver City Music Factory, Dillon Street Studios, Los Angeles
- Genre: Soul; pop
- Length: 36:13
- Label: Dangerbird
- Producer: Chris Seefried, Michael Fitzpatrick

Fitz and the Tantrums chronology
Songs for a Breakup, Vol. 1 (2009)	Pickin' Up the Pieces (2010)	Santa Stole My Lady (2010)

Singles from Pickin' Up the Pieces
- 1. "Winds of Change" Released: June 3, 2010; 2. "L.O.V." Released: October 15, 2010; 3. "Breakin' the Chains of Love" Released: December 17, 2010; 4. "MoneyGrabber" Released: August 15, 2011; 5. "Don't Gotta Work It Out" Released: September 23, 2011

Pickin' Up the Pieces is the debut studio album by American band Fitz and the Tantrums, released on August 24, 2010, by Dangerbird Records. After the success of their home-recorded debut EP, Songs for a Breakup, Vol. 1 and touring, Dangerbird signed the group, who immediately began work on Pieces.

The band drew inspiration from various musical tastes, including Motown records and soul music, and recorded the album in vocalist Michael Fitzpatrick's living room, which he dubbed Dillon Street Studios. It was produced by Fitzpatrick and Chris Seefried.

Upon its release, Pickin' Up the Pieces charted at number one on Billboard's Top Heatseekers and received generally positive reviews from music critics.

== Background ==
Michael Fitzpatrick, vocalist, founded the group shortly after a break-up. Having a hard time after the breakup, Fitzpatrick came to the conclusion that he needed to release the energy through creativity and get a focus and direction, for the sole purpose of distracting him from the discomfort. In late 2008, he received a call from the same ex-girlfriend, who demanded a rigid "no-talking" policy, to tell him about a neighbor who needed to unload a church organ for $50. Thanks to some "shady Russian piano movers," Fitzpatrick had the organ installed in his apartment that night. By morning, he had already written "Breakin' the Chains of Love". "I immediately knew it was the best song I'd written," said Fitzpatrick in 2011. "I could astral plane out and hear myself, like, 'wow!' Not bad!" Fitzpatrick knew he wanted a horn section, and he called college friend and saxophonist James King, and the two immediately began working on early versions of the songs. Fitzpatrick envisioned a full band, in suits, with a female vocalist. King recommended vocalist Noelle Scaggs. Five phone calls later, the Tantrums were assembled, out of college contacts of Fitzpatrick and King. They played their first rehearsal a week later, and instantly clicked. "We could have played a show that same night," recalled Fitzpatrick.

They performed their first show at Hollywood's Hotel Café in December 2008, which Fitzpatrick booked one week after their first rehearsal. The group recorded their debut EP, Songs for a Breakup, Vol. 1, at Fitzpatrick's home in Los Angeles, which he dubbed Dillon Street Studios. Fitzpatrick used his technical skills he honed to engineer the EP himself. Formerly a studio engineer, Fitzpatrick spent the bulk of his professional career behind the scenes, working with producer Mickey Petralia, who produced Beck, Ladytron, Flight of the Conchords, and The Dandy Warhols. The band began to constant airplay on Los Angeles public radio station KCRW. The group had many notable early promoters. "Adam Levine from Maroon 5 was in New York to get a tattoo and his favorite tattoo artist had downloaded the record after hearing us on KCRW," explained Fitzpatrick. "He told Adam, 'you gotta hear this band.'" A week and a half later, Fitz & The Tantrums were opening for Maroon 5 on their college tour. Daryl Hall, of Hall & Oates fame, invited the band to perform on his popular web-series Live from Daryl's House. "I walked back into the kitchen of his big old house in upstate New York and his mother was there," recalled Fitzpatrick. "She said, 'Fitz, come over here. You sound just like my son!'"

The entire foundation of the band from the start was a do it yourself approach. "Nobody was really giving us the time of day in any shape or form," recalled Fitzpatrick. "We just honed our own road, started playing before we even had songs to play, and developed our own fan base organically." The ethic was running out of steam by the time they became one of the major buzz bands at 2010's SXSW, where they ran out of money and resources amid congratulations from fans. However, their last SXSW gig was a show for Dangerbird Records. The following morning, the label's president called a meeting. In April 2010, Dangerbird signed the group, who immediately announced the album title, Pickin' Up the Pieces, and a promise that it would deliver "a burst of effervescent swingers." "The label is literally around the block from my house," Fitzpatrick said.

== Recording ==
The band recorded the entire debut in Fitzpatrick's living room, as they couldn't afford to go into a studio. The band did not soundproof the room, instead desiring to "just go with it," which produced a sense of familiarity. "It let us have this more family, laid-back approach, and to be able to really take the time to do what we wanted in the way that we wanted," said Fitzpatrick.

Focusing on strong songwriting as his influences did, Fitzpatrick desired to achieve a collective energy with the new group, and set a goal to capture "even just a little bit" of the magic of Motown and Stax recordings. He also credits the organ's esoteric properties for the band's sound. Fitzpatrick has described Motown as "the greatest period of songwriting in music ever," but used it as a jumping off point. The band's eclectic musical tastes are reflected in the music of the album. Fitzpatrick, also a fan of Radiohead and Jeff Buckley, desired not to make a "carbon copy" of the soul sound, but instead give it their own spin. "We wanted to see if we could capture the way those records sounded and at the same time push it forward," said Fitzpatrick. Many of the arrangements and instrument choices are "possibly out of the norm," and the group wanted to give some tracks hip hop feel. Also weaved into the music are 1980s influences, from The Jam to Talking Heads to The Style Council. Fitzpatrick wanted to create a juxtaposition between the fun sound of the music and angry, biting lyrics.

== Music and lyrics ==
Pickin' Up the Pieces features soul and pop styles. Its sound mostly comprises vintage organ, crisp drums, handclaps, saxophone, which the band used as a substitute for guitar, and aggressive vocals, including passionate exhortations by Fitzpatrick. Mark Deming of Allmusic views that the album's music gravitates toward the "refined sounds of classic-era Motown, and the East Coast and Chicago styles that informed Northern soul," writing that, "while these songs show a strong and obvious influence of classic '60s soul, there's more than a dash of contemporary pop in the way the hooks make themselves felt, the stylish layers of backing vocals, and the occasional use of drum loops." BBC Music's Paul Lester finds both the song titles and "the lyrics (with their allusions to holdin’ on and walking on by)" to be "steeped in the lexicon of classic R&B." Jay Trachtenberg of The Austin Chronicle characterizes Fitzpatrick as a "blue-eyed soul" singer and adds that Noelle Scaggs "provides vocal fortification up front."

== Critical reception ==
Professional ratings
Review scores
Source	Rating
AllMusic	3.5/5 stars
Alternative Press	4.5/5 stars
The A.V. Club	C
Boston Phoenix	3/4 stars
The Guardian	3/5 stars
Q	4/5 stars
Spin	7/10
Under the Radar	7/10

Pickin' Up the Pieces received generally positive reviews from music critics. At Metacritic, which assigns a normalized rating out of 100 to reviews from mainstream critics, the album received an average score of 74, based on 10 reviews. AllMusic's Mark Deming called it a "solid album" and commended the band for "cut[ting] an impressive groove without cluttering up the arrangements or depending too strongly on their influences to convincingly conjure the sound of the classic era of soul." Q observed "enough retro fizz to get any party started." Jonathan Donaldson of the Boston Phoenix commented that "Fitz[patrick] and dynamic co-vocalist Noelle Scaggs inject life and fun into the Tantrums' retro temptations". Ann Powers of the Los Angeles Times felt that Fitzpatrick's "punky attitude ... makes the sound fresh" and stated, "There's a certain sameness to the songs' tempos and arrangements here, but in general the hooks catch and the energy feels genuine." Alternative Press praised the "recording expertise" and "deceptively analog sound", writing that, "Sonically and lyrically, this is a pristine, soulful pop resurgence, without a moment of filler."

In a mixed review, Michael Hann of The Guardian felt that the album's "expert pastiche of classic soul" lacks a "sense of passionate involvement ... the very thing that lifts retro soul beyond pastiche." Chris Martins of The A.V. Club found its songs formulaic and criticized the band as "bathetic and actorly". Barry Walters of Spin also found it "less finessed" lyrically, but praised Fitzpatrick and Scaggs' singing and stated, "what sets Michael Fitzpatrick and his L.A. crew apart is their mastery of Motown-esque melodies."

== Track listing ==
All tracks are written by Michael Fitzpatrick and Chris Seefried, unless noted.

No.	Title	Writer(s)	Length
1.	"Breakin' the Chains of Love"	Michael Fitzpatrick	2:51
2.	"Dear Mr. President"		2:59
3.	"Pickin' Up the Pieces"	Michael Fitzpatrick, Noelle Scaggs	2:45
4.	"MoneyGrabber"		3:09
5.	"L.O.V."		3:40
6.	"News 4 U"	Michael Fitzpatrick, Chris Seefried, Jeremy Ruzumna	3:57
7.	"Don't Gotta Work It Out"		4:09
8.	"Rich Girls"		3:14
9.	"Winds of Change"		4:09
10.	"Tighter"	Michael Fitzpatrick, Chris Seefried, Jeremy Ruzumna, James King, John Wicks, Ethan Philips	4:56
Total length:			36:16

== Personnel ==
Fitz and The Tantrums

- Michael Fitzpatrick – vocals, keyboards, percussion, production, engineering
- Noelle Scaggs – vocals, percussion
- James King – saxophone, flute
- Ethan Philips – bass guitar
- Jeremy Ruzumna – keyboards
- John Wicks – drums, percussion

Additional musicians/touring musicians

- Maya Azucena – backing vocals
- Sebastian Steinberg – bass guitar
- Matt Cooker – cello
- Miguel Atwood-Ferguson – violin
- Stewart Cole – Trumpet
- Josh Brauchhausen – drums
- Scott Ellis – drums
- Jen Kuhn – cello
- Maya Sykes – backing vocals
- Tay Strathairn – piano

Production

- Chris Seefried – producer, guitar, bass, vocals, keyboards
- Stephen Kaye – mixing
- David Benitez – Additional engineering on "Rich Girls" and "Tighter"
- Lisa Nupoff – management
- Brian Klein – management
- Bernie Grundman – mastering

Artwork

- Piper Ferguson – photography
- Simon McLaughlin – design, layout
- Jeff Nicholas – design, layout

== Charts ==
Chart (2010)	Peak position
US Billboard Top Heatseekers	1

== Release history ==
Region	Date	Label	Format
United States	August 24, 2010	Dangerbird	CD, LP
United States	January 5, 2011	Dangerbird	digital download
United Kingdom	August 22, 2011	Dangerbird	CD
