= Michael Fitzpatrick (musician) =

French musician (born 1970)

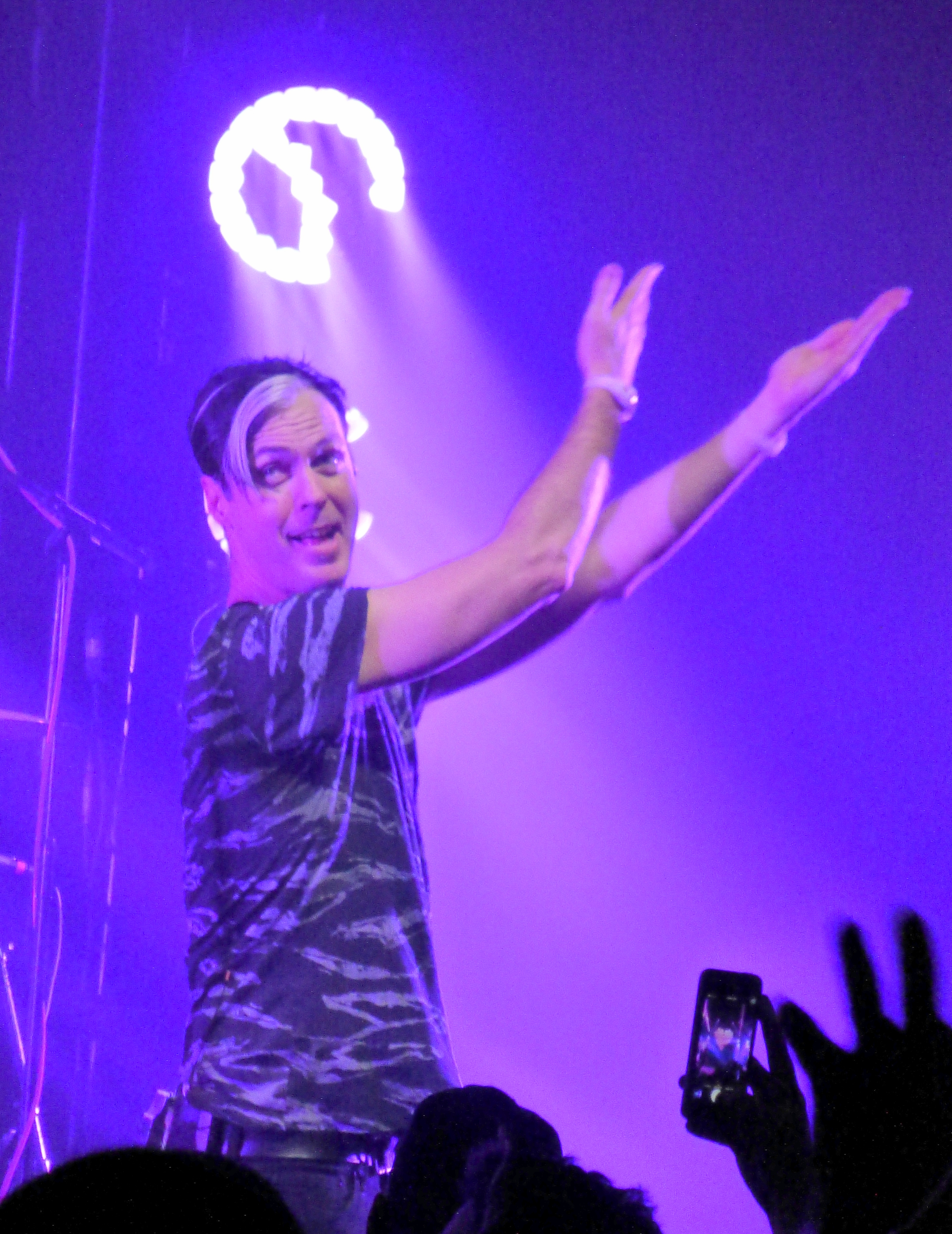
- Fitzpatrick performing at The Fillmore Detroit in 2014

Background information
- Also known as: Fitz
- Born: Michael Sean Fitzpatrick; 21 July 1970 (age 56); Montluçon, France
- Origin: Los Angeles, California, U.S.
- Genres: Indie pop; neo soul
- Occupations: Musician; singer; songwriter
- Instruments: Vocals; piano; keyboards
- Years active: 2007–present
- Label: Dangerbird
- Member of: Fitz and the Tantrums
- Spouse: Kaylee DeFer (m. 2015)

Michael Sean Fitzpatrick (born 21 July 1970), known professionally as Fitz, is a French musician, who is the lead vocalist of the indie pop/neo-soul band Fitz and the Tantrums.

Fitz and the Tantrums were picked as a "band to watch" in an April 2011 profile in Rolling Stone. Their 2010 debut full-length album Pickin' Up the Pieces received critical acclaim and reached #1 on the Billboard Heatseekers chart. In May 2021, Fitzpatrick released his debut solo album, Head Up High.

== Biography ==
Born in Montluçon in Allier, France, Fitzpatrick grew up in Los Angeles. His father, Robert Fitzpatrick, was Irish American and his mother, Sylvie, is French. Michael attended the Los Angeles County High School for the Arts, studying vocal music and then experimental film at the California Institute of the Arts in Santa Clarita, where he met fellow band member James King.

Although Michael Fitzpatrick composes primarily on the piano and organ, he only took formal piano training later in life. He said, "I'd always been a decent singer, but I got frustrated by my inability to play piano by anything more than by ear. I took piano lessons when I was 32, and it opened up a whole new vocabulary for me." He grew up mostly listening to classical music and opera, as he was discouraged from listening to other genres at home. One concession, however, was being allowed to listen to a local oldies radio station in the car driving to and from school.

After college, he worked for many years behind the scenes as a sound engineer for producer Mickey Petralia who produced Beck, Ladytron, Flight of the Conchords, and The Dandy Warhols.

In late 2008, Fitzpatrick received a call from an ex-girlfriend to tell him about a neighbor who needed to unload or sell a church organ for $50. He told her to pay the neighbor $50 and arranged to have the organ moved to his apartment the same day. That evening, inspired by the organ, he wrote the song "Breakin' the Chains of Love". He said, "I immediately knew it was the best song I'd written. I could astral plane out and hear myself, like, 'wow!' Not bad!". Fitzpatrick decided to form a band, and contacted friend and saxophonist James King. During phone calls they began assembling the band with King recommending singer Noelle Scaggs and drummer John Wicks, and Wicks in turn bringing in bassist Ethan Phillips and keyboardist Jeremy Ruzumna. The band met for its first rehearsal a week later and things instantly clicked. In interviews, Fitzpatrick has emphasized his eclectic musical tastes saying, "We [the band] all have a love affair with soul and funk music. For me, it's obviously Otis Redding, Marvin Gaye, the Supremes, all that stuff. My musical taste runs the gamut from Radiohead to Zeppelin to Major Lazer. My older brother was really into '80s new wave, so a lot of the first records I got to borrow and steal were his."

== Personal life ==
In May 2013, it was announced that Fitzpatrick was expecting a child with then-girlfriend actress Kaylee DeFer. DeFer had their son in September 2013. Fitzpatrick and DeFer married on 25 July 2015 and their second son was born in April 2017. A third son was born in May 2019.

== Discography ==
=== Albums ===
==== Solo ====
- Head Up High
- Summer of Us

==== With Fitz and the Tantrums ====
- Pickin' Up the Pieces
- More Than Just a Dream
- Fitz and the Tantrums
- All the Feels
- Let Yourself Free
- Man on the Moon

==== With Band of Merrymakers ====
- Welcome to Our Christmas Party

=== Singles ===
==== As solo artist ====
| Title | Year | Peak chart positions | Album |
| Title | Year | US Adult | Album |
|---|---|---|---|
| "Head Up High" | 2020 | 17 | Head Up High |
| "Congratulations" (solo or with Bryce Vine) | 2021 | – | Head Up High |
| "Life's Too Short" (with Two Friends) | 2021 | – | Non-album single |
"—" denotes a recording that did not chart or was not released in that territory.

==== As featured artist ====
| Title | Year | Peak chart positions | | Album |
| Title | Year | US AAA | US Dance | Album |
|---|---|---|---|---|
| "Broken Drum" (Cash Cash featuring Fitz) | 2016 | — | 44 | Blood, Sweat & 3 Years |
| "Domino" (ZZ Ward featuring Fitz) | 2017 | 24 | — | The Storm |
| "Big Dreams" (The Score featuring Fitz) | 2021 | 24 | — | Metamorph |
"—" denotes a recording that did not chart or was not released in that territory.

=== Guest appearances ===
| Title | Year | Album |
|---|---|---|
| "Not Leaving You Tonight" (LL Cool J featuring Eddie Van Halen and Fitz) | 2013 | Authentic |
| "That's What I Like" (Flo Rida featuring Fitz) | 2015 | My House |
| "Jacked Up" (Remix) (Weezer featuring Nadya of Pussy Riot and Fitz) | 2016 | Weezer |
"—" denotes a recording that did not chart or was not released in that territory.
