= Fitz and the Tantrums =

American band

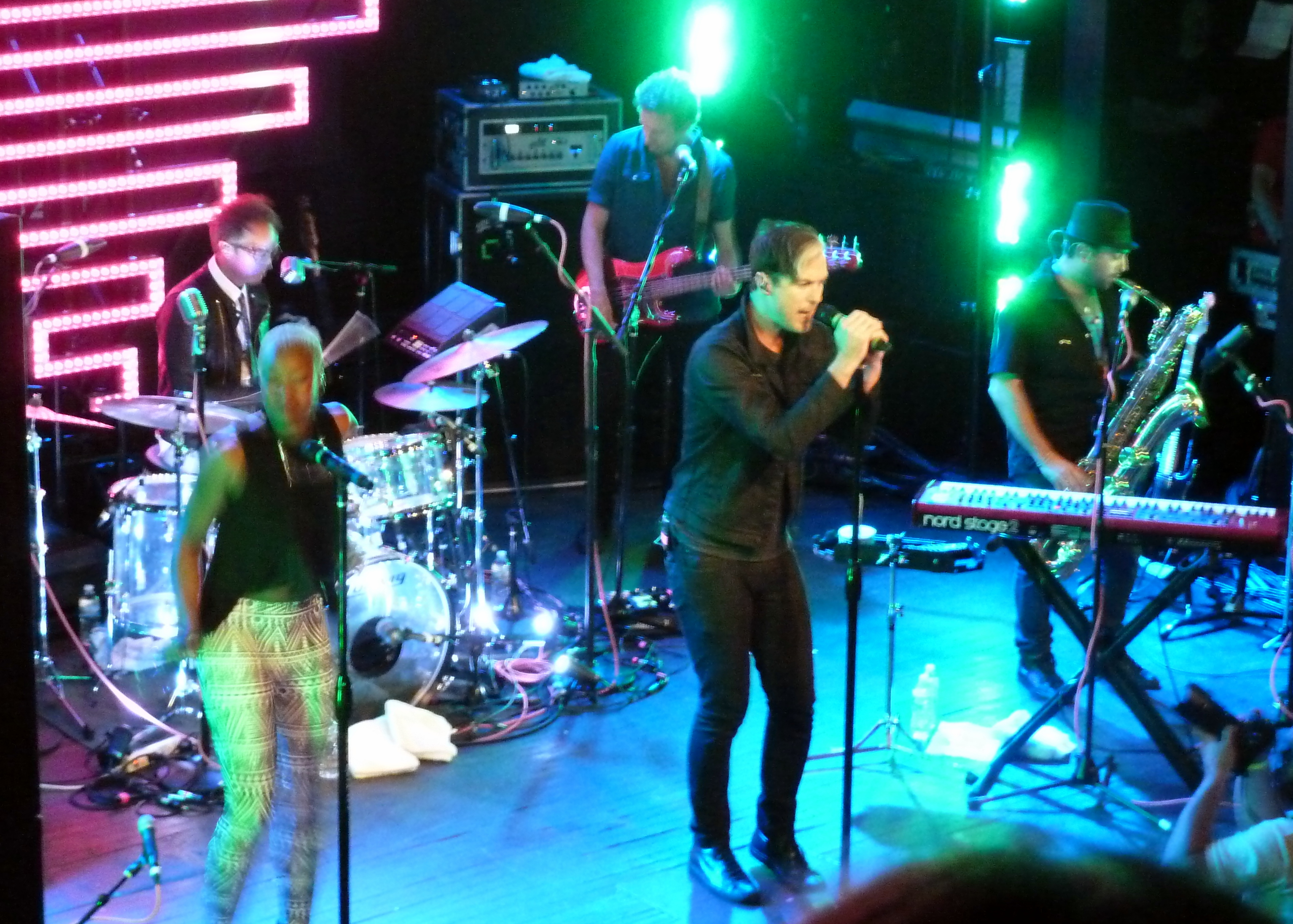
- Fitz and the Tantrums in 2013

Background information
- Origin: Los Angeles, California, U.S.
- Genres: Indie pop; neo soul
- Years active: 2008–present
- Labels: Dangerbird; Elektra
- Members: Michael Fitzpatrick; Noelle Scaggs; Joe Karnes; James King; Jeremy Ruzumna
- Past members: Ethan Phillips; John Wicks
- Website: fitzandthetantrums.com

Fitz and the Tantrums are an American indie pop and neo soul band from Los Angeles, California, that formed in 2008. The band consists of Michael Fitzpatrick (lead vocals), Noelle Scaggs (co-lead vocals and percussion), James King (saxophone, flute, keyboard, percussion and guitar), Joseph Karnes (bass guitar), and Jeremy Ruzumna (keyboards). John Wicks, who played drums and percussion, left the band in 2022 to teach at the University of Montana. Their debut studio album, Pickin' Up the Pieces, was released in August 2010 on indie label Dangerbird Records and received critical acclaim; it also reached no. 1 on the Billboard Heatseekers chart. In early 2013 the band signed to their current label, Elektra Records, which released their second LP, More Than Just a Dream, the same year. Their self-titled third album was released in 2016, which contains their most notable song, "HandClap". Their fourth studio album, All the Feels, was released in 2019, their fifth, Let Yourself Free, in 2022, and their sixth, Man on the Moon, in 2025.

== History ==
=== Early history (2008–2009) ===
Fitz and the Tantrums was founded by Michael Fitzpatrick in 2008. Having purchased an old Conn electronic organ, he was inspired to write the song "Breakin' the Chains of Love" that same night. He contacted his college friend, saxophonist James King, who recommended singer Noelle Scaggs and drummer John Wicks. In turn, King brought in bassist Joseph Karnes and keyboardist Jeremy Ruzumna. According to Fitzpatrick, the band immediately clicked. He has said, "It was literally like five phone calls, one rehearsal, and we could have played a show that night." The band performed their first show at Hotel Café in Hollywood, in December 2008, which Fitzpatrick booked one week after their first rehearsal. In interviews, he has stated the importance of booking a date before the band was ready, in order to bring out the best in all performers. During the first half of 2009, they performed at several clubs in Los Angeles, including The Viper Room and Spaceland. Before Joseph Karnes was brought into the band, the previous bassist, Ethan Phillips was with the band for the first EP, and a part of their first album, "Pickin' Up The Pieces".

The band recorded their debut EP, Songs for a Breakup, Vol. 1, during the first half of 2009 at Fitzpatrick's home in Los Angeles. The EP was first released on August 11, 2009, through Canyon Productions. In September 2009 they toured with Hepcat and Flogging Molly. In November 2009 the band opened eight concerts on the Maroon 5's Back to School Tour. Their appearance was on short notice, after previously scheduled opener K'naan cancelled due to fatigue in late October. According to Fitzpatrick, "Adam Levine from Maroon 5 was in New York to get a tattoo, and his favorite tattoo artist had downloaded the record after hearing us on the radio. He told Adam, 'you gotta hear this band.' A week and a half later, we're opening for Maroon 5 on their college tour." In December 2009 the band shot the official music video for their first single, "Breakin' the Chains of Love", which was directed by Joshua Leonard. It features Fitzpatrick and Scaggs in a moving and rotating bed.

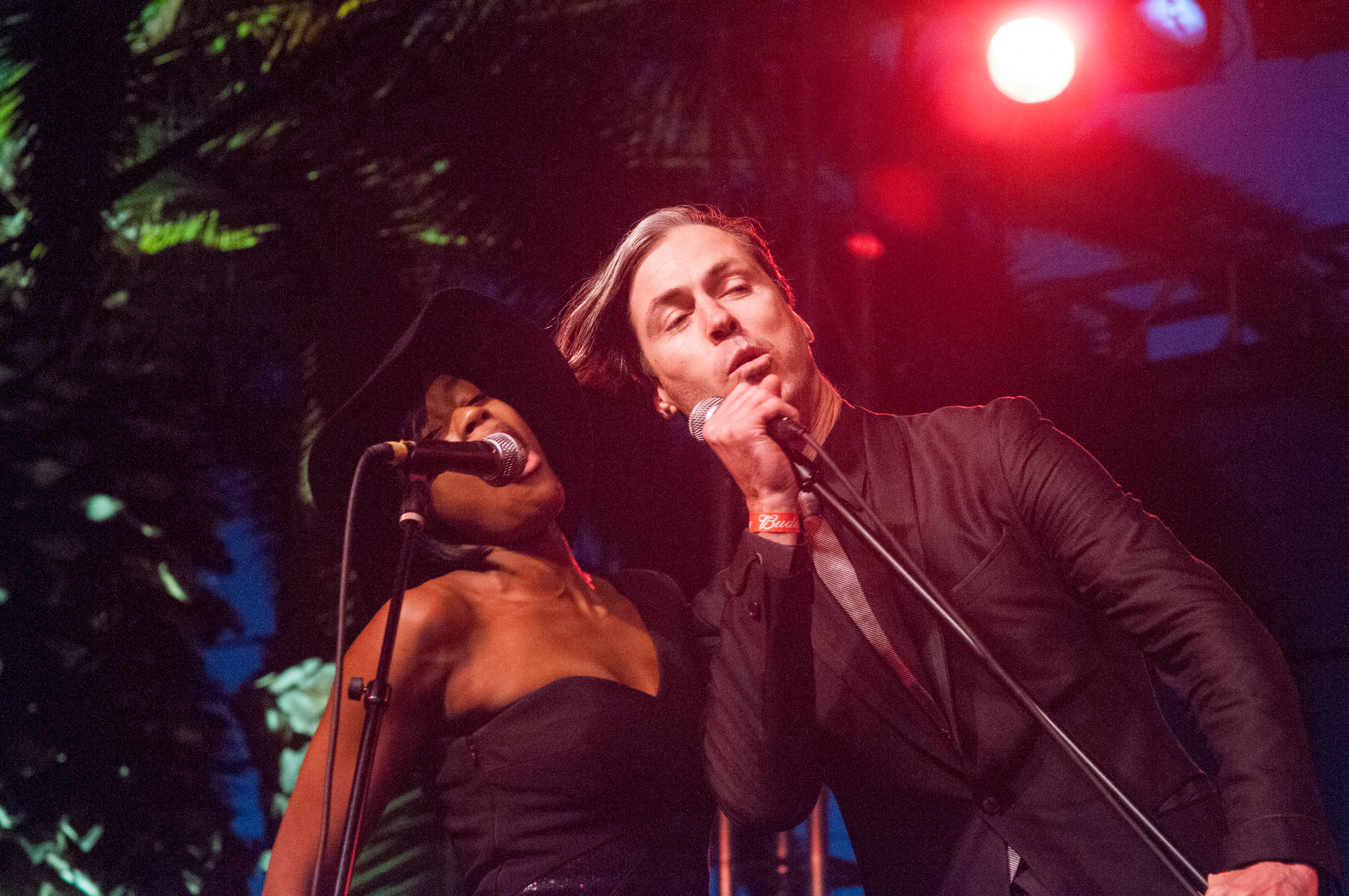
Michael Fitzpatrick and Noelle Scaggs at a 2010 performance in San Diego

=== Pickin' Up the Pieces (2010–2012) ===
In March 2010 Fitz and the Tantrums played at the SXSW festival in Austin, Texas. On April 15, 2010, they opened for ska band The Specials on their North American reunion tour at Club Nokia in Los Angeles. On April 26, 2010, Dangerbird Records announced that they had signed Fitz and the Tantrums. Their first full-length album, Pickin' Up the Pieces, was released on August 24, 2010. Producer Chris Seefried was also a co-writer on the album. In October 2010, Daryl Hall invited the band to perform on his web-series Live from Daryl's House. They played a seven-song set including four Fitz and the Tantrums songs, early Hall song "Girl I Love You", "Perkiomen" and finishing with "Sara Smile". "I walked back into the kitchen of his big old house in upstate New York, and his mother was there," recalled Fitzpatrick. "She said, 'Fitz, come over here. You sound just like my son!'"

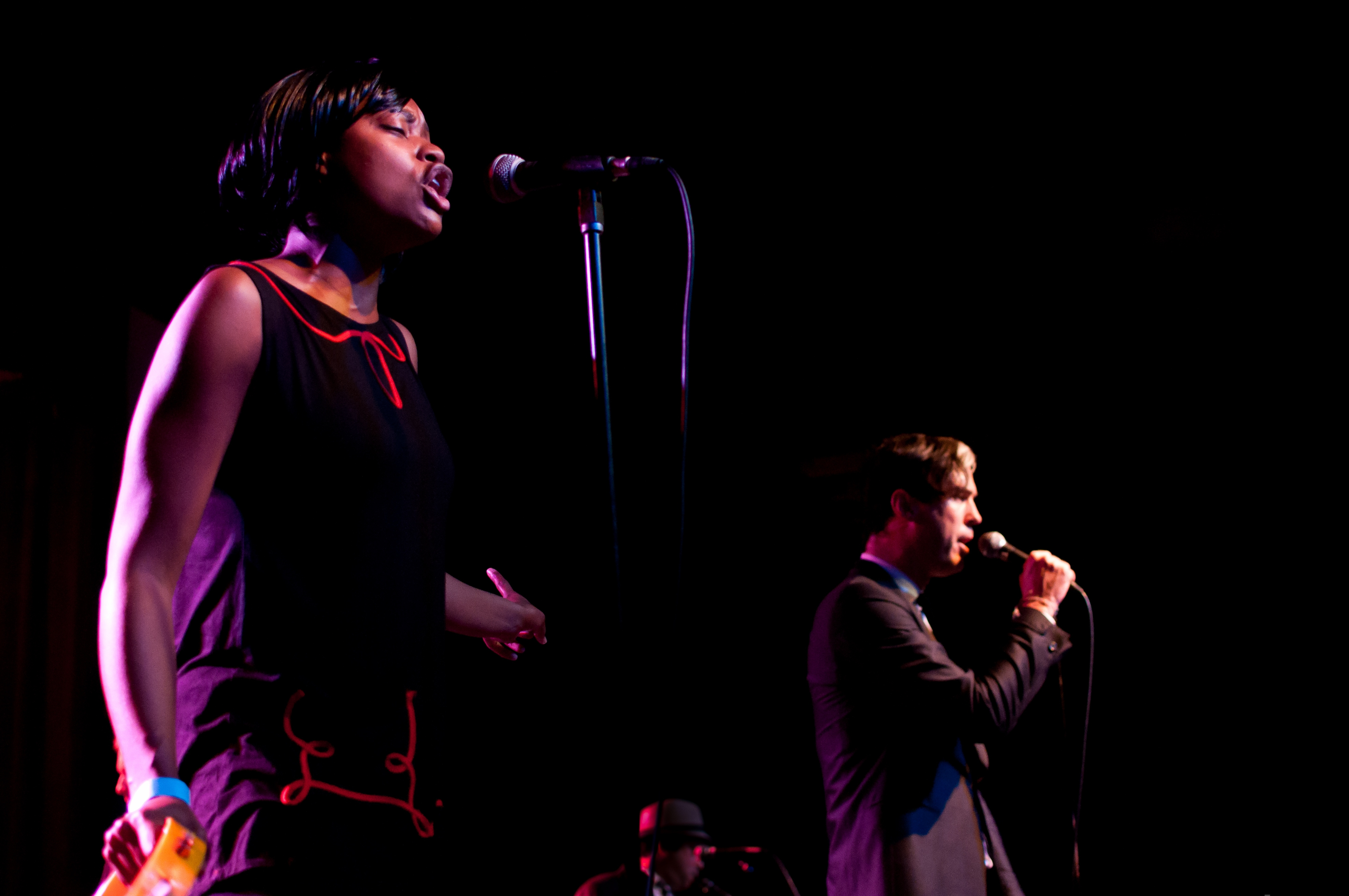
Fitz and the Tantrums in 2010

The band performed the songs "MoneyGrabber" and "Don't Gotta Work It Out" on ABC's Jimmy Kimmel Live! in Los Angeles on January 12, 2011. On February 28 they performed "MoneyGrabber" on TBS' Conan, and on April 5 on NBC's The Tonight Show with Jay Leno. In 2011 the band announced a U.S. and international tour with April Smith and the Great Picture Show. In the fall of 2011, they made their first appearance at Austin City Limits Music Festival. On Friday, February 3, 2012, they performed "Don't Gotta Work It Out" on NBC's Late Night with Jimmy Fallon, episode 581, taped for broadcast at the Hilbert Circle Theatre in Indianapolis. They performed a free show at Thursday at the Square in Buffalo, New York, on June 14, 2012, and at the Basilica Block Party in Minneapolis, Minnesota, on July 7, 2012.

=== More Than Just a Dream (2013–2015) ===
The band's second LP, More Than Just a Dream, was released May 7, 2013, on Elektra Records. It was produced by Tony Hoffer. The album features the lead single "Out of My League", which reached number one on Billboard's Alternative Songs chart on September 30, 2013. A French version of "Out of My League" was also released and played on Canadian radio. This version has most of the verses sung in French, while the chorus remains in English. The second single from More Than Just a Dream, "The Walker", also reached number one on the Billboard Alternative songs chart. In October 2014 Fitz and the Tantrums returned to the Austin City Limits Music Festival and played both weekends of the expanded festival.

=== Fitz and the Tantrums (2016–2018) ===
In March 2016, the band released the lead single, "HandClap", off their self-titled album. The album was released on June 10, 2016, and was supported by the 2016 Get Right Back Summer Tour. In July 2016 Fitz and the Tantrums performed at Slossfest in Birmingham, Alabama. The band supported OneRepublic on the 2017 Honda Civic Tour which began on July 7, 2017.

=== All the Feels (2019–2021) ===
On March 20, 2019, the band released the single "123456" from their fourth studio album. The second single, "Don't Ever Let Em", was released on April 17 of the same year, followed by "I Need Help!" on May 3, and then the title track of the album, "All the Feels" on June 28.

The album, All the Feels, consists of 17 songs and was released on September 20, 2019, through Elektra Records.

=== Let Yourself Free (2022–2024) ===
On June 10, 2022, the band released the single "Sway" through Elektra Records. This was followed by the single "Moneymaker" on September 27, 2022, along with the announcement of their fifth studio album Let Yourself Free, which was released on November 11, 2022.

=== Man on the Moon (2025) ===
On March 28, 2025, the band released the lead single from their forthcoming studio album titled "Ruin the Night" and their sixth studio album, Man on the Moon was released on July 25, 2025.

== Musical style ==
Fitzpatrick has said that the band's musical style can be fairly described as "soul-influenced indie pop". He said that while the band is influenced by the classic songs of the Motown and Stax record labels, the band is not trying to create an exact replica of that music. In another interview, Fitzpatrick talked about his decision not to use guitars in the band. "I did want to try and make a big sounding record without guitars," he said. "For me, I just feel like in any music that has a band, the guitar is always there, it's always featured, it's always prevalent. I'm just sick of hearing it."

== Critical reception ==
Los Angeles Times music critic Ann Powers wrote, "Fitz & the Tantrums is the kind of band that communicates best in concert, but this album serves as a fine proxy and party-starter." Aly Comingore of the Santa Barbara Independent wrote that the band members craft "soulful, nostalgia pop that's not only infectious, but just fresh enough to make it stand apart from its predecessors." The band was heralded as a "band to watch" in an April 2011 profile in Rolling Stone. In June 2011, Vogue named Fitz and the Tantrums the "Hardest-Working Band" of the 2011 summer festival circuit. "Not only do L.A.–based six-piece Fitz and the Tantrums share James Brown's penchant for snazzy-dressed brass bands and feel-good retro ballads, they also have the late godfather of soul's tireless work ethic." Their third album has been described as "a product of contemporary market forces and a depressing relic of an era of the music industry best forgotten."

== Band members ==
Current members

- Michael Fitzpatrick – lead vocals, keyboards (2008–present)
- Noelle Scaggs – co-lead vocals, percussion (2008–present)
- James King – saxophones, flute, harmonica, keyboards, percussion, guitars (2008–present)
- Joseph Karnes – bass (2010–present)
- Jeremy Ruzumna – keyboards (2008–present)

Former members

- Ethan Phillips – bass (2008-2010)
- John Wicks – drums, percussion (2008–2022)

Touring musicians

- Blair Sinta – drums, percussion (2022–present)

== Discography ==
- Pickin' Up the Pieces (2010)
- More Than Just a Dream (2013)
- Fitz and the Tantrums (2016)
- All the Feels (2019)
- Let Yourself Free (2022)
- Man on the Moon (2025)
