= Dangerbird Records =

American rock independent record label

- Founded: 2004
- Founder: Peter Walker, Jeff Castelaz
- Distributor: The Orchard
- Genre: Alternative rock, indie rock
- Country of origin: United States
- Location: Silver Lake, Los Angeles, California
- Official website: dangerbirdrecords.com

Dangerbird Records is an independent record label in Los Angeles, California. The label is home to artists from around the world and part of the burgeoning Silver Lake music scene. The label has had international success from its small roster of artists including Silversun Pickups, Fitz and the Tantrums, Sebadoh, Minus the Bear, and The Frights

== History ==
The two founders represented different roles in the music industry. Jeff Castelaz had managed Feist, Phoenix, Citizen King, and others, while Peter Walker was a singer-songwriter. The label's first release: Walker's solo album Landed.

Their business approach includes a strong emphasis on artist development, and working with a network of partners to help the bands reach a wide market.

In 2006, Dangerbird gained repute after releasing Carnavas, the debut full-length album by Silversun Pickups, to sales of over 450,000. The band's lead singer Brian Aubert has said of Dangerbird, "They believe in careers, and the long haul - something that majors used to believe in. They stuck with us when most people wouldn't have."

On September 14, 2012, co-founder Peter Walker announced the promotion of Jenni Sperandeo to President and the departure of co-founder Jeff Castelaz. Sperandeo said in a statement, "After nearly 20 years in radio promotion, management and artist development, I am thrilled for the opportunity to step into this more comprehensive role at a rare, artist-driven enterprise."

In October, 2025 it was announced that Walker sold the Dangerbird catalog to Exceleration Music for an undisclosed amount. As part of the deal, Exceleration will take over the label’s catalog operations, which include around 120 albums and more than 30 artists.

== Artists ==
=== Current roster ===
- A Grape Dope
- Arthur King
- Bill Baird
- Coleman Zurkowski
- The Colorist Orchestra & Howe Gelb
- Cones
- Criminal Hygiene
- Danny Frankel, Victoria Williams, Doug Wieselman
- The Dears
- Dev Ray
- Grandaddy
- Hank May
- Harry the Nightgown
- Holly Miranda
- Jason Lytle
- Joel Jerome
- Joel Jeromino, Jimi Cabeza de Vaca
- Jordi
- Juiceboxxx
- Matt Costa
- Milly
- Mirrorball
- Murray A. Lightburn
- Night Shop

- NO WIN
- People Flavor
- Peter Walker, David Ralicke, Danny Frankel
- Randy Randall
- *repeat repeat
- Sea Wolf
- Sebadoh
- Slothrust
- Slow Mass
- Spain
- Spring Summer
- Swervedriver
- Tim Rutili
- Total Heat
- Touchy
- Unicorns at Heart

=== Former roster ===
- A. Sinclair
- All Smiles
- Arthur King and the Night Sea
- Bad Veins
- Beady Eye (US/Canada)
- Ben Lee
- Blonde Summer
- Boots Electric
- Broadheads
- Butch Walker
- Codeine Velvet Club
- Dappled Cities
- Darker My Love
- Delphic
- Division Day
- Ed Laurie
- Eric Avery
- Eulogies
- Fitz and the Tantrums
- The Frights
- The Fling
- Hot Hot Heat
- JJAMZ
- Jesse Harris

- Maxwell, Miranda, Parsley
- Minus the Bear
- Midnight Faces
- Moke Hill
- Nav/Attack
- Peter Walker
- Royal Teeth
- Richie Sambora
- Sabrosa Purr
- Silversun Pickups
- Skysaw
- T. Hardy Morris
- The Fling
- The Frights
- The Limousines
- The Night Sea
- The One AM Radio
- The Promise Ring
- UME
- Joy Zipper
- La Rocca
- Maritime

== See also ==
- List of record labels

== Other sources ==
- MarketWatch.com - "Dangerbird Records Catalog is Newest Addition to DeliRadio"
- Style Section LA - "A Rare Bird"
- HypeBot.com - "DropKick Murphys, Dangerbird Records Talk D.I.Y. & Fan Engagement With Ian Rogers"
- ArtHouseMusic.com - "Dangerbird Records"
- Buzzbands.la - "Dangerbird Records' eight-band day party raises $2,500 for the Pablove Foundation"
- Billboard Magazine - "Piero Giramonti Named Dangerbird Records President"
- The Comet - "Dangerbird Records and Reach Music Enter Publishing Agreement"
- PR Newswire - "Fontana Partners with Dangerbird Records"
- PlugInMusic.com - "Dangerbird Records Soar into SXSW"
- Racked.com - "Branding the Band: Dangerbird's Darker My Love Promo"
- ABC News - "Dangerbird Records Founder on a Mission Against Cancer"
