= Live and Rare (Faster Pussycat EP) =

Live album and EP by Faster Pussycat
- Released: 1990
- Recorded: 1990
- Genre: Hard rock
- Length: 25:33
- Label: Alex Imports

Faster Pussycat chronology
Wake Me When It's Over (1989)	Live and Rare (1990)	Belted, Buckled and Booted (1992)

Live and Rare is a Faster Pussycat EP. All tracks on the album appeared on the band's first two albums, but are featured here in alternate remixed, edited, or live versions.

== Track list ==
1. "Bathroom Wall" (Remix)
2. "Poison Ivy" (Edit)
3. "Pulling Weeds" (Live)
4. "Slip of the Tongue" (Live)
5. "Babylon" (Live)
6. "House of Pain" (Edit)

== Personnel ==
- Taime Downe – lead vocals
- Greg Steele – guitar
- Brent Muscat – guitar
- Eric Stacy – bass guitar
- Mark Michals – drums
