= Between the Valley of the Ultra Pussy =

Remix album by Faster Pussycat
- Released: May 15, 2001
- Genre: Hard rock, industrial rock
- Label: Deadline Records
- Producer: Taime Downe

Faster Pussycat chronology
Whipped! (1992)	Between the Valley of the Ultra Pussy (2001)	The Power and the Glory Hole (2006)

Professional ratings
Review scores
Source	Rating
Allmusic	link

Between the Valley of the Ultra Pussy is an album of industrial remixes of Faster Pussycat songs from the late 1980s and early 1990s, released after they reunited for a tour in 2001. Lead singer Taime Downe had always favored industrial rock and had been recording in that style since Faster Pussycat's break-up.

== Track listing ==
1. "Arizona Indian Doll"
2. "Bathroom Wall"
3. "Little Dove"
4. "Poison Ivy"
5. "Smash Alley"
6. "Out with a Bang"
7. "Body Thief"
8. "House of Pain"
9. "Cathouse"
10. "Where There's a Whip, There's a Way"
11. "Slip of the Tongue"
12. "I Was Made for Lovin' You"
13. "Blood" (Unreleased demo)

== Personnel ==
Faster Pussycat

- Taime Downe – lead vocals, programming, producer
- Greg Steele - guitar
- Brent Muscat - guitar
- Eric Stacy - bass guitar
- Brett Bradshaw - drums
- Mark Michals - drums
