= Belted, Buckled and Booted =

Belted, Buckled And Booted

EP by Faster Pussycat
- Released: 1992
- Genre: Glam metal
- Label: Elektra
- Producer: John Jansen

Faster Pussycat chronology
Live and Rare (1990)	Belted, Buckled And Booted (1992)	Whipped! (1992)

Belted, Buckled And Booted is a Faster Pussycat EP.

== Track listing ==
1. "Nonstop to Nowhere" - 6:37
2. "Too Tight" - 5:04
3. "Charge Me Up" - 4:10
4. "You're So Vain" (Carly Simon cover) - 4:08

Track 1 from the Whipped! album. Tracks 2 and 3 are unreleased tracks from the Whipped! sessions. Track 4 was originally released in 1990 on Rubáiyát: Elektra's 40th Anniversary.

== Personnel ==
- Taime Downe: lead vocals
- Greg Steele: guitar
- Brent Muscat: guitar
- Eric Stacy: bass guitar
- Brett Bradshaw: drums
