= Thunder and Mud =

1990 film by Penelope Spheeris

- Directed by: Penelope Spheeris
- Starring: Tawn Mastrey; Jessica Hahn; Sam Mann
- Release date: 1990
- Country: United States
- Language: English

Thunder and Mud is a 1990 musical documentary film directed by Penelope Spheeris and starring Jessica Hahn, Tawn Mastrey, and Sam Mann.

== Summary ==
The film depicts a show as presented by Sam Mann with a local DJ host (Mastrey) alongside Jessica Hahn, who a few years prior was known as having an affair with Jim Bakker of The PTL Club; jokes involving sex and PTL are done throughout the film, which includes skits (since everything, including the fight outcome is scripted). Several bands (Grave Danger, Nuclear Assault, Tuff, She-Rok, and Young Gunns) are shown with brief performances before mud wrestling is done, with each wrestler in a fight being a representative of the bands (after each fight, a band comes onto the stage and lip-syncs one of their songs). Various wrestlers and performers are seen, such as Jeanne Basone, Tiffany Million, and Quisha; Bill Gazzari, once described as the "godfather of metal" and previously featured in Spheeris' The Decline of Western Civilization Part II: The Metal Years (1988), is also shown.

== Production ==
When doing an interview in 1999 for The A.V. Club, Spheeris was asked about the film. She stated, "How about that for a flaming piece of crap? That was a matter of… God, how did that happen? Thank God nobody has ever asked me about that until now. There was a guy working with Miles Copeland, and he said, "Let's do a live show and tape it, and then put it out straight to video." And I said, "Like what?" It wasn't really my idea, I don't think, but he said, "How about doing heavy metal and mud wrestling and putting the two together?" I said, "Yeah." So I did it. And I don't even think I got paid for it, which is kind of pathetic, don't you think?"

Paul Colichman, president of I.R.S. Records along with a producer of The Decline of Western Civilization Part II: The Metal Years, has stated that he and Spheeris came up with the idea, with him wanting to do a "pay-per-view event" that would combine wrestling with music, which he thought would work since he had seen mud wrestlers handing out with metal bands at the nightclub Gazzarri's.

== Reception ==
Entertainment Weekly reviewed the early career of director Penelope Spheeris which they called "flashy but desultory". They gave a Thunder and Mud a grade D.
