= Drew Bernstein =

American fashion designer

- Born: 1963; Los Angeles, California, U.S.
- Died: August 18, 2014 (aged 51); Los Angeles, California, U.S.
- Partner: Madeline Pendleton

Drew Bernstein (1963 – August 18, 2014) was an American punk, goth, fetish fashion designer and musician who founded notable clothing companies Lip Service and Kill City.

== Music ==
Bernstein played in several punk bands including Crucifix and America's Hardcore. He once appeared in Penelope Spheeris' punk film, Suburbia.

== Designer ==
Bernstein established the Lip Service clothing company in 1985 when at the age of 21 he was influenced by fashion designers of glam and death rock. Instead of continuing in their footsteps he saw a viable outlet for branding to goths and punks. In the company's beginning he relates he had a lot of wild ideas including his first success with selling leggings with prints of skulls and daggers. He began the alongside Linda Judy-Pugh in his garage making screen prints.

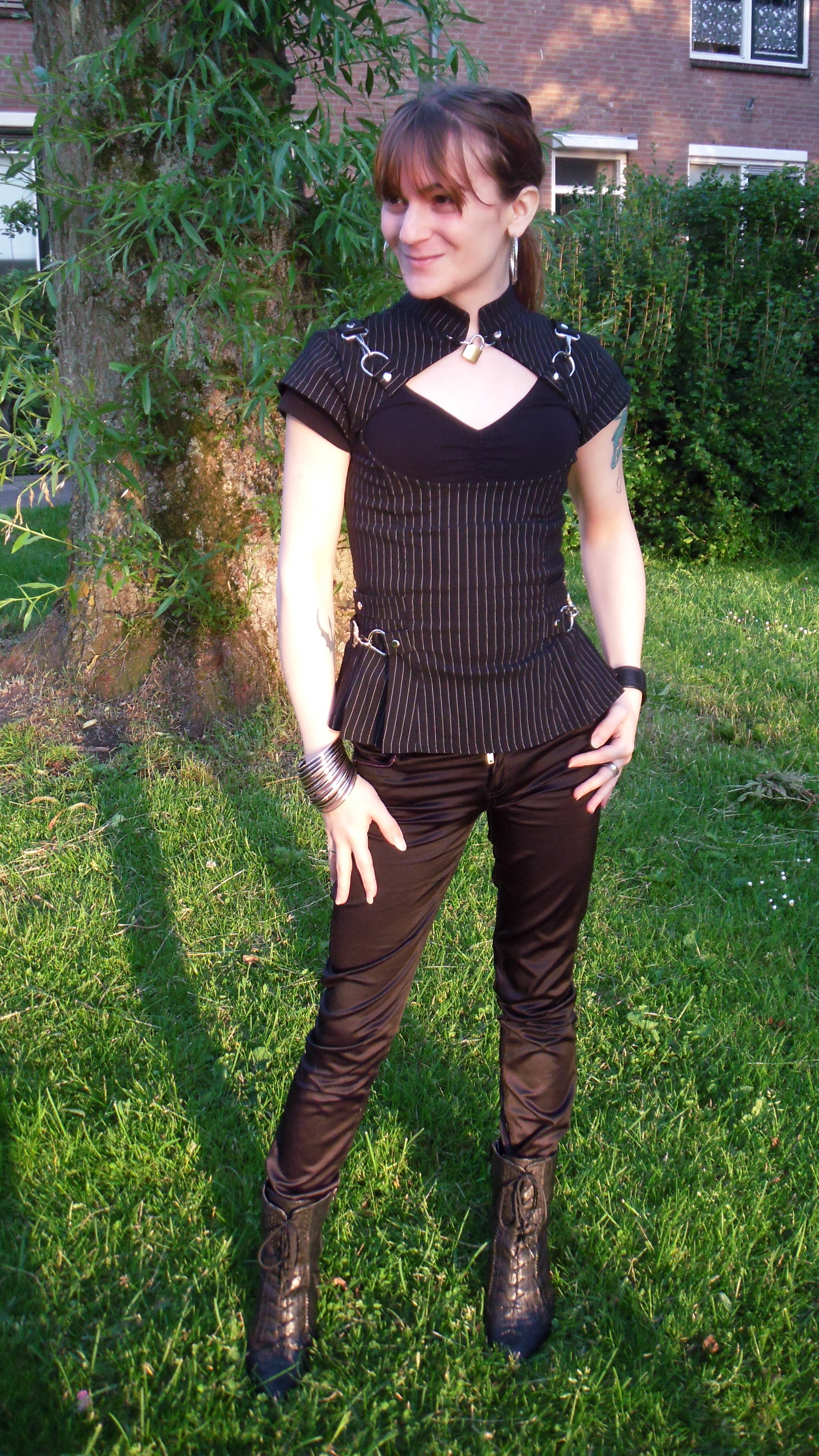
Model shows outfit from Lip Service

The brand was picked up by musicians and their fans who could access the clothes through specialty boutiques such as Retail Slut and NaNa. With growth, new accounts were added including California retail chain Hot Topic. Close friend Izzy Stradlin, guitarist of Guns N' Roses, took one of Bernstein's Lip Service jackets and gave it to his singer Axl Rose to wear. The result was a major boost in sales.

In 2005, he launched the Kill City brand, his edgy contemporary men and women's line. Bernstein opened retail stores between the 1980s and early 1990s, on Melrose Avenue in Los Angeles and then on Hollywood Boulevard. Bernstein opened another Kill City store on Melrose Avenue in 2008. Bernstein sold his brands to Los Angeles–based Iron Fist, continuing to work with the company as creative director until his death of an apparent suicide on August 18, 2014.

Lina Lecaro of LA Weekly wrote in tribute: "Throughout the company's history, Bernstein remained its heart and soul. Despite evolving, he never abandoned the flamboyant underground. He employed hundreds of rockers and club miscreants in his companies, teaching them the ropes about business and mentoring future movers and shakers. He also sponsored Hollywood club events up until his death."
