= Front Row for the Donkey Show =

Live album by Faster Pussycat
- Released: July 7, 2009
- Recorded: 2009
- Genre: Glam metal
- Length: 54:26
- Label: Full Effect

Faster Pussycat chronology
The Power and the Glory Hole (2006)	Front Row for the Donkey Show (2009)

Front Row for the Donkey Show is Faster Pussycat's first live album, released on July 7, 2009.

== Track listing ==
Track listing adopted from Discogs.

No.	Title	Length
1.	"Intro"	1:37
2.	"The Power and The Glory Hole"	4:03
3.	"Cathouse"	3:42
4.	"Slip Of The Tongue"	4:45
5.	"Number 1 With a Bullet"	3:28
6.	"Sex Drugs And Rock And Roll"	4:03
7.	"House Of Pain"	6:13
8.	"Where There's A Whip There's A Way"	5:42
9.	"Porn Star"	4:35
10.	"Bathroom Wall"	5:00
11.	"Shut Up And Fuck"	2:17
12.	"Babylon"	3:47
13.	"It's Only Rock And Roll"	5:08
Total length:		54:26

Professional ratings
Review scores
Source	Rating
Sea of Tranquility	link
Sleaze Roxx	link

== Credits ==
- Taime Downe: Lead vocals
- Michael Thomas: Guitar
- Xristian Simon: Guitar
- Danny Nordahl: Bass
- Chad Stewart: Drums
