= House of Pain (Faster Pussycat song) =

Single by Faster Pussycat

from the album Wake Me When It's Over
- B-side: "Slip of the Tongue"
- Released: September 1989
- Recorded: 1988
- Genre: Glam metal
- Length: 5:47
- Label: Elektra
- Songwriters: Taime Downe; Greg Steele
- Producer: John Jansen

Faster Pussycat singles chronology
"You're So Vain" (1990)	"House of Pain" (1989)	"Nonstop to Nowhere" (1992)

"House of Pain" is a power ballad by American heavy metal band Faster Pussycat. The song was released as the third and final single from their second album, Wake Me When It's Over (1989). It is the most popular song by the band, peaking at No. 28 and 32 on the US Billboard Hot 100 and Cash Box Top 100 charts. The song is about Taime Downe's painful childhood experiences with having an absent father. The accompanying music video was directed by Michael Bay.

== Track listing ==
7" single

Side A
No.	Title	Length
1.	"House of Pain"	5:47

Side B
No.	Title	Length
1.	"Slip of the Tongue"	4:27

US 12" single

Side A
No.	Title	Length
1.	"House of Pain" (radio edit)	4:26

Side B
No.	Title	Length
1.	"House of Pain" (album version)	5:47

Spain 12" single

Side A
No.	Title	Length
1.	"House of Pain"	5:47

Side B
No.	Title	Length
1.	"Slip of the Tongue"	4:32
2.	"Pulling Weeds" (live)	4:32

UK 12" single

Side A
No.	Title	Length
1.	"House of Pain" (radio edit)	4:26

Side B
No.	Title	Length
1.	"Little Dove" (live)	5:09

Cassette single

Side A
No.	Title	Length
1.	"House of Pain"	5:47

Side B
No.	Title	Length
1.	"You're So Vain" (Carly Simon cover)	4:08

EP single

No.	Title	Length
1.	"House of Pain" (album version)	5:47
2.	"Little Dove" (live)	5:09
3.	"Smash Alley" (live)	3:32
4.	"Pulling Weeds" (live)	4:32

== Personnel ==
Faster Pussycat

- Taime Downe – lead vocals
- Greg Steele – guitar, piano, backing vocals
- Brent Muscat – guitar
- Eric Stacy – bass guitar
- Mark Michals – drums, percussion

Additional musicians

- Jimmy Zavala – harmonica

== Charts ==
Chart (1990)	Peak position
US Billboard Hot 100	28
US Mainstream Rock Airplay (Billboard)	23
US Cash Box Top 100	32

== Use in other media ==
The song was featured in the Peacemaker episode "The Choad Less Traveled". Towards the end of the episode, the titular character listens to the song while reflecting on his childhood trauma and turning to drugs and alcohol for support.

== See also ==
- List of glam metal albums and songs
