= Loaded Guns (band) =

American melodic metalcore band

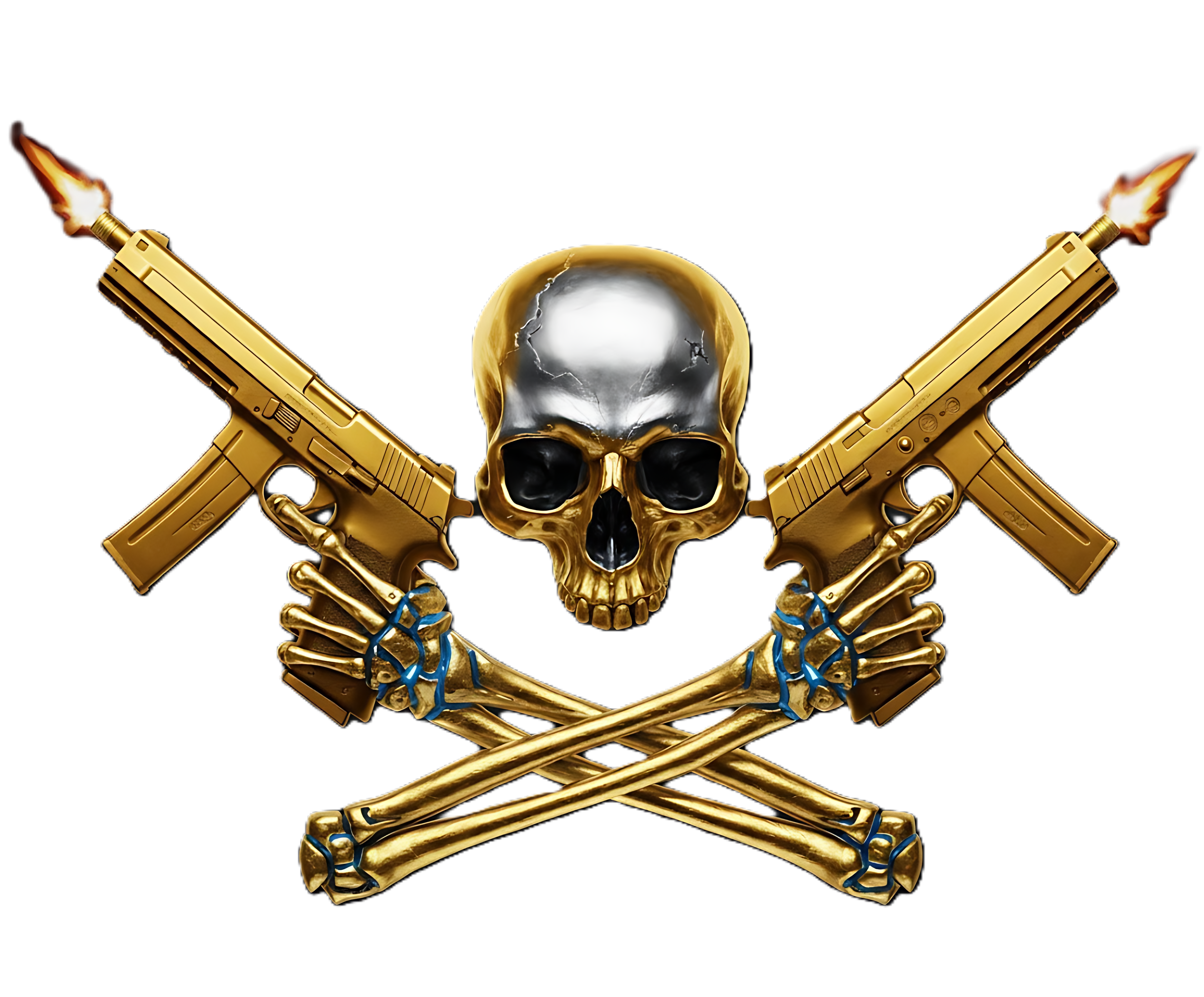
- Official symbol/logo of the band Loaded Guns (2026)

Background information
- Origin: Miami, Florida, U.S.
- Genres: Melodic metalcore
- Years active: 2011–present
- Labels: Century Media Records (2016–2017), Cyber Tank Records (2026–present)
- Website: Cyber Tank Records Official Page

Loaded Guns is an American melodic metalcore band formed in 2011. The group is best known for their 2017 extended play Unstoppable, released through Century Media Records and Sony Music. After a nine-year period of inactivity, the band announced their return in early 2026.

== History ==
=== Formation and early years (2011–2015) ===
Loaded Guns was established in 2011 by brothers Rafael and Andrew Salazar in Miami, Florida. During their formative years, the group was active in the South Florida rock scene, with performances documented in local archives throughout Miami, Kendall, and Hialeah. On April 22, 2015, the band opened for Faster Pussycat at Grand Central in Miami.

=== Century Media era (2016–2017) ===
In 2016, the band was discovered by Century Media Records at Churchill's Pub. The band officially signed with the label and released the EP Unstoppable on August 25, 2017. The lead single "Bring Us Down" was released with a music video directed by Matt Akana.

=== Return (2026–present) ===
In February 2026, the band announced its reformation with the release of the single "Confidence In Coffins" on February 6, 2026. This was followed by the release of the single "Reckless" on February 13, 2026.
