= Gotta Love It =

Gotta Love It may refer to:

- "Gotta Love It", a 1993 song by Aerosmith from Get a Grip
- "Gotta Love It", a 2006 song by Faster Pussycat from The Power and the Glory Hole
