= Dallas City Limits =

Music venue in Dallas, Texas, United States

Dallas City Limits was a live music venue and nightclub located at 10530 Spangler Road in Dallas, Texas. It played an important role in the Dallas music scene from the late-1980s until its closure in the mid-1990s. Its demise was due to the growing popularity in grunge music and the decline in metal. Some of the acts that performed at Dallas City Limits include Kiss, Extreme, Robin Trower, Anthrax, Ted Nugent, Cheap Trick, Pantera, Alice in Chains, Faster Pussycat, Dream Theater and Blue Öyster Cult.
