= Ain't No Way Around It =

"Ain't No Way Around It" may refer to:

- "Ain't No Way Around It", a 1986 song by Charley Pride from The Best There Is
- "Ain't No Way Around It", a 2011 song by DJ Drama from Third Power
- "Ain't No Way Around It", a 1989 song by Faster Pussycat from Wake Me When It's Over
