= Magnus Walker =

British-American fashion designer and car collector

- Born: July 7, 1967 (age 58); Sheffield, England
- Occupations: Fashion designer, car collector, car builder
- Years active: 2003–present
- Spouse(s): Linda Walker (unknown); Karen Caid (m. 1994-2015); Hannah Elliott (m. 2024)
- Children: None

Magnus Walker (born July 7, 1967) is a British-American fashion designer and car collector. He emigrated to the United States in 1986 at nineteen and eventually established a clothing brand, called Serious, with his second wife, Karen Caid Walker. Having been fascinated with Porsche since childhood, Walker started collecting and customizing vintage Porsches, mostly the air-cooled 911 models. After the documentary Urban Outlaw about his life, Walker became one of the world's most visible faces of the Porsche and car collecting scene. He has since been featured in a multitude of media, such as The Joe Rogan Experience (2015), Jay Leno's Garage (2017), and the 2015 video game Need for Speed.

In 2014, Walker completed a TEDx talk called "Go With Your Gut," which has since seen more than 9.5 million views. Walker has more than 25 Hot Wheels cars in his signature line, including multiple variations on his signature "277" race car. He was the first personality to have his own line of signature MOMO steering wheels without being a professional race car driver. His memoir, "Urban Outlaw: Dirt Don't Slow You Down", reached the U.K. best-seller list in the automotive category.

== Early life ==
Walker was born in 1967 to middle-class parents. Growing up in Sheffield, England, Walker's fascination with the Porsche brand sparked when his father took him to the 1977 Earl's Court Motor Show as a 10-year-old, where he saw the Porsche 911 for the first time. After that, he wrote Porsche a letter, asking for a job. Porsche replied and encouraged him to apply for a job after finishing school. However, in 1982, Magnus dropped out of school, got involved with the punk rock and heavy metal scenes, and bounced around places and jobs. Seeing no perspective for the future in Britain, he decided to follow the American Dream and try his luck in the US. He got accepted as an instructor at a summer camp north of Detroit in 1986. He traveled to Los Angeles soon after the camp was over.

== Fashion career ==
Shortly after he arrived in Los Angeles, Walker stumbled into fashion. When he was a little boy, his mother Linda had taught him how to sew, and having re-sewn a pair of $10 pants to make them fit, they were noticed by Taime Downe of the band Faster Pussycat. Walker sold Downe eight pairs of his customized pants for $25 each and soon after established a stall on Venice Beach, where he would sell customized clothing he revamped from inexpensive clothes he bought at flea markets or second-hand stores. As the market stall took off, he created a clothing company called Serious. Simultaneously to launching it, he met Karen Caid, who went by the name Hooch, a designer he had run into at trade shows. Hooch decided to ditch her clothing line, Hooch, and teamed up with Walker. She applied her flamboyant design talents to Walker's ability to choose fabrics, which made the brand a success. After opening a store on Melrose Avenue in LA the clothing garnered a following and was worn by Madonna, Alice Cooper, and Bruce Willis.

To accommodate their company's growth, which was now being sold by many retailers, the pair bought a run-down factory building in the Arts District of Los Angeles. The building was used for the fabrication of Serious clothing but soon became host to many TV shows, commercials, and feature films that were shot there as a popular film location. Bruce Willis, Victoria Beckham, Jay-Z and Prince, among others, have filmed adverts, films or music videos on his company grounds. After about 15 years of manufacturing clothes, sales of Serious clothing began to dwindle, and Walker and his wife no longer felt connected to the scene, so they closed their business. On June 1, 2017, Walker's book autobiography Urban Outlaw: Dirt Don't Slow You Down, was published.

== Urban Outlaw Film ==
In 2012, Canadian filmmaker Tamir Moscovici approached Walker, who had a concept for a documentary film. The resulting short film, Urban Outlaw, was premiered at the 2012 Raindance Film Festival and turned Walker into a public phenomenon for the custom car scene. Subsequently, he was featured in multiple automobile magazines and invited to events. Walker displayed his cars at the 2013 Los Angeles Auto Show. Porsche executives visited the car at the time; spokesman for the company Nick Twork was quoted as saying, “We can't go as far as to say we endorse his work. That's pretty hard for a company like ours to say, but his cars have a unique style, and we have taken notice.”

== Car collection ==
Walker bought a 1974 Porsche 911 in 1992. He started to collect more cars and joined the Porsche Club of America in 2002. He started participating in race events and focused his efforts on completing his collection of vintage 911s. Having a background in fashion design, he did not conform to the unwritten rules of vintage car restoration and strived to turn every car he owned into a unique piece of art without compromising its Porsche roots.

Walker's newfound fame led to Porsche, 35 years after he wrote a letter of application as a child, to reach out to him. He appeared in several other documentaries, such as I am Steve McQueen (2014) and Motor City Outlaw (2016), and TV shows, such as How I Rock It (2013), The Joe Rogan Experience (2015), and Jay Leno's Garage (2017), mostly centering on his role as a Porsche collector and customizer. In 2015, he was featured in the video game Need for Speed, as one of the icons the player character and his crew seek to impress.

On June 25, 2021, Nike collaborated with Walker on a Nike SB Dunk High modeled after arguably the most famous of his cars, a 1971 Porsche 911 T nicknamed the "277". The sneaker includes several references to both the Porsche itself (277 branding on the outer heel and insole, color blocking similar to the car's design, and a "wear away" design that reveals a gold finish under a white top layer of paint, etc.), as well as nods to Magnus' legacy, such as the red and green flannel sock liner, a reference to Walker's "Urban Outlaw" brand on the outer midfoot panel, as well "Union Jack" detailing on the tongue tag with Nike SB branding on the outer side of the midsole in the traditional Porsche font.

== Personal life ==
After his first marriage, Walker was married to Karen Caid for 21 years. She died in 2015. In 2024, Walker married Hannah Elliott, a journalist for Bloomberg Businessweek.

== Filmography ==
=== Documentaries ===
Year	Title	Role	Notes
2012	Urban Outlaw	Himself	
2014	I am Steve McQueen	Himself	
2016	Motor City Outlaws	Himself	

=== Television series ===
Year	Title	Role	Notes
2013	How I Rock It	Himself	1 episode ("John Varvatos, Magnus Walker, Rob Zabrecky, Marcus Samuelsson")
2015	The Joe Rogan Experience	Himself	1 episode ("Magnus Walker and Alex Ross")
2017	Jay Leno's Garage	Himself	1 episode ("Hand Made")

=== Video games ===
Year	Title	Role	Notes
2015	Need for Speed	Himself	
