= Seduce (band) =

American heavy metal band

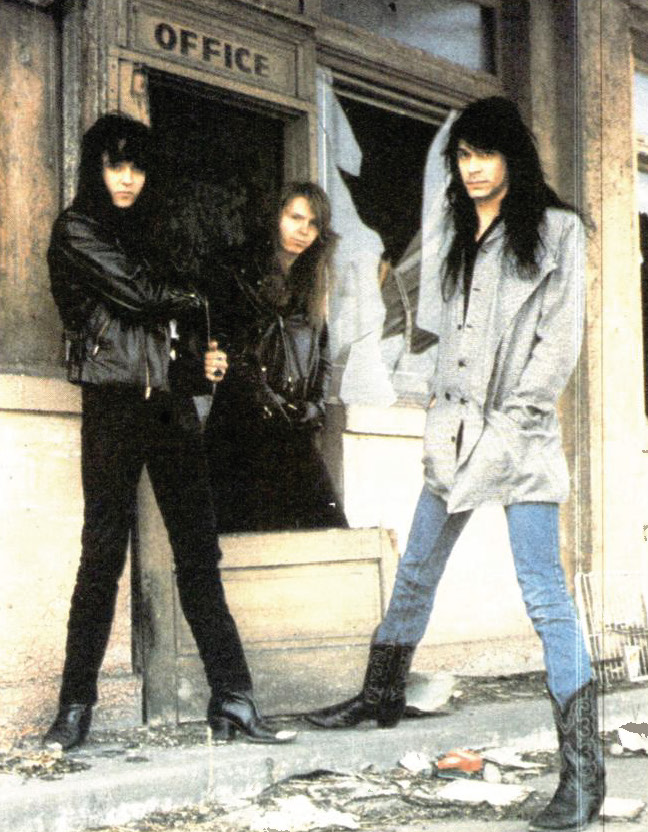
- Seduce (Mark Andrews, Chuck Burns, and David Black) c. 1988

Background information
- Origin: Detroit, Michigan, U.S.
- Genres: Heavy metal; hard rock
- Years active: 1980–1991; 2002–2005; 2008; 2011; 2016–present
- Labels: Psycho-Mania Records; I.R.S. Records
- Members: Mark Andrews; Chuck Burns
- Past members: David Black; Mike Alonso; Dexter Arney; Mark Finnell; Steve Firneno; Angelo Ganos; Johnny Roxx; Mickey St. Claire

Seduce is an American heavy metal band formed in Detroit, Michigan in 1980.

They are best known for their appearance in Penelope Spheeris’ cult music documentary film The Decline of Western Civilization Part II: The Metal Years.

== History ==
Seduce was formed in 1980 when Mark Andrews and David Black, initially playing in a band called Sparks, met Chuck Burns through mutual friends. "Mark and I jammed through a few things and put the first version of Seduce together, then Chuck came along later," Black remembers. The band released their self-titled debut album in 1985. Seduce performed their songs "Colleen" and "Crash Landing" in the music documentary film The Decline of Western Civilization Part II: The Metal Years and released their second album, Too Much Ain't Enough, in 1988. Seduce performed with Accept, Saxon, Girlschool, Iggy Pop, and Vinnie Vincent Invasion around this time. After issues with their record label and lineup changes in the band, Seduce broke up in 1991. The members would go on to play in other bands such as Speedball, the Skeemin' Nogoods, Universal Temple of Divine Power, Heresy, Crud, the Shakey Jakes, and Negative Approach. Seduce reformed in 2002 and has been consistently performing one-off reunion shows since then.

On June 28, 2026, David Black died from cancer.

== Musical style and influences ==
Seduce's musical style has been described as heavy metal and hard rock. Some of the bands that Seduce was influenced by include Motörhead, Van Halen, Alice Cooper, Discharge, the New York Dolls, the Sweet, and Led Zeppelin.

== Band members ==
Current members

- Mark Andrews – lead vocals, bass
- Chuck Burns – drums

Former members

- David Black – guitar (died 2026)
- Mike Alonso – drums
- Dexter Arney – drums
- Mark Finnell – lead vocals
- Steve Firneno – drums
- Angelo Ganos – lead vocals
- Johnny Roxx – lead vocals
- Mickey St. Claire – drums

== Discography ==
Studio albums

- Seduce (1985)
- Too Much Ain't Enough (1988)

== See also ==
- List of heavy metal bands
