= House of Pain (disambiguation) =

House of Pain is an American hardcore hip-hop group.

House of Pain may also refer to:

== Fiction ==
- House of Pain, a fictional laboratory in H.G. Wells' 1896 novel The Island of Doctor Moreau
- "House of Pain" (The Grim Adventures of Billy & Mandy), a television episode

== Music ==
- House of Pain (album), a 1992 album by House of Pain
- "House of Pain" (Faster Pussycat song), 1989
- "House of Pain", a song by Deep Purple from Bananas
- "House of Pain", a song by The Game from LAX
- "House of Pain", a song by Van Halen from 1984
- "House of Pain", a song by Venom from Metal Black
- "House of Pain", a song by Paul Wall and Chamillionaire from Controversy Sells

== Sports venues with the nickname ==
- Carisbrook, an outdoor stadium in Dunedin, New Zealand
- Sardis Road, a rugby union stadium in Pontypridd, Wales
- Subiaco Oval, an outdoor stadium Perth, Western Australia

== See also ==
- Tyler Perry's House of Payne, an American sitcom
