= Dreams from a Dirt Nap =

Studio album by The Newlydeads
- Released: 2006
- Genre: Industrial rock, gothic rock, electronica

The Newlydeads chronology
Dead End (2001)	Dreams from a Dirt Nap (2006)

Dreams from a Dirt Nap is a compilation album by the band The Newlydeads containing 18 songs recorded between the years 1997 and 2001. Stylistically, the tracks range from industrial rock to gothic rock and electronica.

In addition to a number of original songs, the album includes a covers of Siouxsie and the Banshees' "Cities in Dust", and Tones on Tail's "Go".

== Track listing ==
All tracks by Taime Downe except where noted.

1. "Submission" – 4:03
2. "Sleeping Pill" – 5:09
3. "Night of the Living Dead" – 4:20
4. "In Denial" – 4:23
5. "Go" (Ash, Campling, Haksins) – 4:40
6. "Six Feet Deep" (Downe, Xristian Simon) – 5:26
7. "Skin Tight Skin" – 4:11
8. "Die" – 4:09
9. "Cities in Dust" (Siouxsie and the Banshees) – 5:35
10. "Poor Little Baby" – 3:48
11. "Melting" – 5:12
12. "Severed" (Down, Simon) – 4:01
13. "Black Eye" – 3:56
14. "Hot Pink Hot Rod" (Down, Green) – 4:24
15. "Panties" – 4:56
16. "Bunch of BS" – 1:11
17. "Black & Shiny" (Down, Kelli) – 4:15
18. "Silent Night" – 4:10
