= Uncle Tom's Fairy Tales =

Lost 1969 Richard Pryor film

- Directed by: Penelope Spheeris
- Written by: Richard Pryor
- Produced by: Penelope Spheeris
- Starring: Richard Pryor
- Language: English

Uncle Tom's Fairy Tales (also known as Bon Appétit, The Trial, and Uncle Tom's Fairy Tales: The Movie For Homosexuals) is a 1969 American drama film directed and produced by then-film student Penelope Spheeris. The film stars and is written by Richard Pryor. Pryor historian Anthony Balducci calls it a "mysterious, unfinished film. It is questionable whether it even belongs in a listing of his films: It was not completed and has been lost for decades." The film was disowned by Pryor, who was unhappy with it and destroyed part of the footage during post-production. It was thought to be completely lost for many years, but a copy may exist in the archives of the Academy of Motion Picture Arts and Sciences or elsewhere.

== History ==
Pryor decided to produce the film himself after becoming frustrated with the lack of work he was getting in Hollywood. In his book In A Pryor Life, Pryor's son Richard Pryor Jr. said that it was funded with money from presents received for his marriage to his wife Shelley.

Details about the film's pre-production and shooting are hazy. Pryor apparently did not write a traditional script for the film, but wrote notes by hand in a spiral notebook. The plotline is not known for certain, but Pryor's biographers David and Joe Henry write that it concerned "a wealthy white man abducted by a group of Black Panther-type militants and put on trial for all the racial crimes in U.S. history." In addition to writing and funding the film, Pryor apparently played multiple roles, including a poet and a defense attorney.

Pryor told his biographers David and Joe Henry that he remembered shooting the movie in March 1969. Filming was reportedly chaotic, with copious amounts of cocaine and alcohol on hand. It also co-starred comedians Paul Mooney and Franklyn Ajaye. Mooney, a close friend of Pryor's, would later call the movie "a project conceived and executed in a drug haze." Mooney stated that Pryor didn't approach the film with a plan, but simply bought a 16mm camera and began filming.

Spheeris, then still a film student, spent more than a year at Pryor's house editing the film. While the film was being edited, during an argument with Shelley Pryor, his wife at the time, Pryor ripped apart much of the footage by hand. A partial, 40-minute edit was then re-assembled by Spheeris from the surviving footage. After she finished this rough cut, Pryor arranged a private screening for Bill Cosby at UCLA. His reaction is not known, but rumors circulated afterwards that Cosby may have bought the film and buried it to remove Pryor as a source of competition, or may have been feeling charitable toward Pryor, who had sunk a huge amount of his own money into the film. Spheeris left the project after not being paid for three months.

Pryor later said that he destroyed the only copy remaining.

Spheeris discovered a 30-minute reel of unedited, silent footage in her own archives 35 years later and donated it to the Academy of Motion Picture Arts and Sciences.

In June 2005, scenes from the film (possibly from the rediscovered footage Spheeris had donated) appeared in a retrospective while Pryor was being honored by the Directors Guild of America. In August 2005, Pryor and his wife and attorney-in-fact, Jennifer Lee-Pryor, filed a lawsuit against Spheeris and Pryor's own daughter, Rain. The suit claims that Spheeris and Pryor's daughter conspired to take the surviving film from his home sometime in the mid-1980s. According to the suit, he contacted Spheeris after the tribute. She allegedly revealed she had given the footage to the Academy Film Archive of the Academy of Motion Picture Arts and Sciences and intended to give the film to Rain. Pryor died in December 2005 but the suit is still currently pending.

In 2023, Spheeris told the website Den of Geek that she and Jennifer Lee Pryor were working together to collect all surviving footage from the film, but that the Cosby family was not cooperating with their efforts.
