= Whipped! =

Studio album by Faster Pussycat
- Released: August 4, 1992
- Recorded: 1991–1992 at Soundworks, West Los Angeles, California; Track Record Studios, North Hollywood, California (Overdubs)
- Genres: Hard rock, glam metal
- Length: 52:43
- Label: Elektra
- Producer: John Jansen

Faster Pussycat chronology
Wake Me When It's Over (1989)	Whipped! (1992)	Between the Valley of the Ultra Pussy (2001)

Singles from Whipped!
- 1. "Nonstop to Nowhere" Released: 1992; 2. "The Body Thief" Released: 1992

Professional ratings
Review scores
Source	Rating
AllMusic	4/5 stars
Calgary Herald	D
Collector's Guide to Heavy Metal	7/10

Whipped! is the third album by the American band Faster Pussycat, released in 1992 by Elektra Records.

"Nonstop to Nowhere", for which there is a video, was released as a single and reached No. 35 on Billboard's Mainstream Rock track chart.

The track "Mr. Lovedog" was a tribute to the Mother Love Bone singer Andrew Wood, who had died in 1990.

The tracks "Too Tight" and "Charge Me Up" were recorded during these sessions, but did not make it onto the final album. They were released on the Belted, Buckled and Booted EP.

There are two different versions of the Whipped! album cover; one features a zoomed-out shot of the band running away from a giant dominatrix, whereas the other version is a zoomed-in version of the same picture, so it simply looks like the band members are running across a beach.

The record was not released on vinyl in the United States, but was in Europe and a number of Asian countries, including Korea.

== Critical reception ==
Billboard's reviewer praised the album's diversity and strength of musical material. He singled out "AOR -ready anthem in "Nonstop To Nowhere," an innuendo - ridden teaser in "Big Dictionary," and two strong ballads: "Friends," a touching paean to friendship, and "Mr. Lovedog," a tribute to the late Andrew Wood of Mother Love Bone" and predicted chart entering.

== Track listing ==
No.	Title	Lyrics	Music	Length
1.	"Nonstop to Nowhere"	Taime Downe	Downe, Greg Steele	6:57
2.	"The Body Thief"	Downe	Downe, Brent Muscat, Eric Stacy, Steele	4:56
3.	"Jack the Bastard"	Downe	Downe, Muscat, Steele	4:07
4.	"Big Dictionary"	Downe	Muscat, Steele	2:56
5.	"Madam Ruby's Love Boutique"	Downe	Muscat, Stacy, Steele	3:42
6.	"Only Way Out"	Downe	Stacy, Steele	3:53
7.	"Maid in Wonderland"	Downe	Muscat, Stacy, Steele	5:05
8.	"Friends"	Downe	Downe, Steele	4:47
9.	"Cat Bash"	Downe	Steele	1:42
10.	"Loose Booty"	Downe, Steele	Brett Bradshaw, Muscat, Stacy, Steele	3:29
11.	"Mr. Lovedog"	Downe	Downe, Muscat, Steele	6:30
12.	"Out with a Bang"	Downe	Downe, Muscat, Steele	4:39
Total length:				52:43

== Personnel ==
Faster Pussycat

- Taime Downe – lead vocals, backing vocals
- Greg Steele – electric guitar, acoustic guitar, keyboards, mandolin, backing vocals, co-lead vocals on "Loose Booty", lead guitar on 1–4, 6, 7, 9, 11
- Brent Muscat – electric guitar, acoustic guitar, sitar, backing vocals, lead guitar on 5, 8, 10, 12
- Eric Stacy – bass guitar, backing vocals
- Brett Bradshaw – drums, percussion, backing vocals

Additional musicians

- Jimmy Z – harmonica and flute on "Big Dictionary", saxophone
- Art Velasco – trombone
- Daniel Fornetro – trumpet
- Chuck Kavooras – slide guitar on "Friends"
- Nicky Hopkins – piano on "Friends"
- Bekka Bramlett – backing vocals
- Lisa Reveen – backing vocals
- Stephanie Weiss – backing vocals
- Pasadena Boys Choir – boys choir on "Mr. Lovedog"

== Production ==
- John Jansen – producer, mixing
- Ryan Dorn – engineer
- Tom Hardisty – assistant engineer
- Brian Virtue – assistant engineer
- Nelson Ayres – assistant engineer
- Greg Calbi – mastering
- Eric Troyer – additional background vocals, arrangements
- Nick Egan – art direction
- Eric Roinestad – design
- Markus Morianz – photography
- Mique Willmott – logo and illustrations

== Charts ==
Chart (1992)	Peak position
Japanese Albums (Oricon)	43
UK Albums (Official Charts)	58
US Billboard 200	90
