= We Sold Our Souls for Rock 'n Roll =

2001 film

- Directed by: Penelope Spheeris
- Produced by: Sharon Osbourne
- Cinematography: Jeff DeVuono, Penelope Spheeris
- Edited by: Jeffrey Doe, Nina Lucia
- Music by: Steve Mccroskey
- Release date: 2001
- Running time: 90 minutes
- Country: United States
- Language: English

We Sold Our Souls for Rock 'n Roll is a 2001 documentary by Penelope Spheeris. It was filmed at the 1999 Ozzfest and won an award for "Most Popular Documentary" at the 2001 Melbourne International Film Festival. It was shot in high-definition video using Sony cameras.

== Cast ==
- Black Sabbath
- Buckethead
- Deftones
- Fear Factory
- Godsmack
- Ozzy Osbourne
- Primus
- Rob Zombie
- Slayer
- Slipknot
- Static-X
- System of a Down

== Release ==
The documentary received mixed reviews. Legal issues delayed the release.
