= The Decline of Western Civilization Part III =

1998 film by Penelope Spheeris

- The theatrical poster
- Directed by: Penelope Spheeris
- Produced by: Ross Albert; Guy J. Louthan; Scott Wilder
- Cinematography: Jamie Thompson
- Edited by: Ross Albert; Ann Trulove
- Music by: Phil Suchomel
- Distributed by: Spheeris Films
- Release date: January 1998 (United States)
- Running time: 86 minutes
- Country: United States
- Language: English

The Decline of Western Civilization III is a 1998 American documentary film directed by Penelope Spheeris. It is the third film of a trilogy by Spheeris depicting life in Los Angeles at various points in time. The film chronicles the gutter punk lifestyle of homeless teenagers.

== Production ==
The first film, The Decline of Western Civilization (1981), dealt with the punk rock scene during 1979–1981. The second film, The Decline of Western Civilization Part II: The Metal Years (1988), covers the Los Angeles heavy metal movement of 1986–1988.

She had recently directed Wayne's World and Beverly Hillbillies.

== Synopsis ==
As mentioned in the opening credits, the film was shot between July 1996 and August 1997 in Los Angeles. It is dedicated to "Squid, Stephen Chambers, and all the gutterpunks that survive."

The film involves gutter punks who take the anti-establishment message with extreme seriousness and tune out society completely. Spheeris talks to homeless teenagers living on the street or squatting in abandoned buildings in Los Angeles that go by the names of "Why-Me?", "Hamburger", "Troll", "Eyeball", "Squid", and others. Los Angeles Police Department officer Gary Fredo and a paralyzed youth living on disability benefits are also interviewed. Near the end, the film shows a memorial squat location near the place where a local squatter, Stephen Chambers, died in a fire.

Musicians interviewed include Keith Morris (Black Flag, Circle Jerks), Rick Wilder (The Mau Maus), and Flea (Fear, Red Hot Chili Peppers). Morris had previously appeared in the first The Decline of Western Civilization. Performances by four bands were filmed: Final Conflict, Litmus Green, Naked Aggression, and The Resistance.

The film ends by listing the fate of two of the interviewees. "Squid" died on July 19, 1997, from multiple stab wounds. "Spoon" was in L.A. County Jail awaiting trial for his murder.

== Reception and distribution ==
The film premiered at the 1998 Sundance Film Festival, where it won the Freedom of Expression Award. It was screened at the Cannes Film Festival and the Chicago Underground Film Festival, where it received a jury award. It never went into general release and was not available on VHS or DVD until the release in 2015 of a box set containing all three films on DVD and Blu-ray.

This was partly due to Spheeris refusing to relinquish the rights to the first two parts of the trilogy in order to enable the third to be released. According to an article by Laura Snapes, "there was little demand to see such a depressing movie, and the few distribution offers that Spheeris got required her to hand over the rights to the first two movies, which she refused to do". Decline III was also released separately via streaming video.

== Aftermath ==
Spheeris later credited the 1998 film with having a profound effect on her. She began a relationship with a man she met while filming the movie, signed up to be a foster parent, and eventually fostered five children.
