= Tawn Mastrey =

American infotainer

Tawn Mastrey (August 20, 1954 – October 2, 2007) was an American disc jockey, music video producer, one of rock radio's top media personalities. She hosted a daily show on Sirius Satellite Radio's Hair Nation Channel 23, 1 p.m. to 5 p.m. Eastern time, 10 a.m. to 2 p.m. Pacific time.

Mastrey was heard nationally on Westwood One Entertainment's Absolutely Live High Voltage every other week. Mastrey hosted, wrote, produced and syndicated her own radio specials, RockZone and Sammy Hagar's Cabo Wabo Happy Hour, through Mastrey Productions, Inc. She did voice-overs, owned her own video production company, Ladies In Production Services, and wrote a cookbook, Eat This. Beginning Aug. 20, 2024, Tawn Mastrey Estate is proud to rebroadcast some of her shows presented by Cabal Records on Facebook.

== Education ==
Mastrey studied broadcasting at Ron Bailie's School of Broadcast in San Francisco, California.

== Career ==
Mastrey had hosted radio shows in California for KQLZ Pirate Radio in Los Angeles, KNAC in Long Beach, KLSX in Los Angeles, KMEL in San Francisco, and KSJO in San Jose, before appearing on KUFO in Portland, Oregon, in the late 1990s, and at KXXR in Minneapolis, Minnesota. At KNAC, Mastrey was known as the 'Leather Nun," a nickname she was accorded by a San Francisco-area radio station program director, who thought she resembled a character from a German comic book with that name.

Mastrey hosted MTV's stringer reports when the cable TV music channel first launched. She also hosted television specials for MTV and local Los Angeles television programs, and starred as the featured host for the Metal Head Video Magazine series.

In film, Mastrey appeared as herself in The Blues Brothers, Heavy Metal Thunder and Mud and The Decline of Western Civilization, Part II: The Metal Years.

She had been the long-time imaging voice of WPBZ - 103.1 The Buzz in West Palm Beach, Florida.

Mastrey produced music videos including the Scorpions' "No One Like You", Greg Kihn's "Happy Man", and Romeo Void's "Never Say Never".

Mastrey was also the mid-day DJ on Hair Nation (part of the Sirius radio lineup) and although she dropped her nickname, "The Leather Nun", she maintained the same on-air persona she always had throughout her career.

Impact on hard rock, punk, new wave and heavy metal music

Among the first to add new artists such as AC/DC, Cheap Trick, The Sex Pistols, The Ramones, Devo, The Police, Joan Jett, and countless other now legendary bands to the playlist while working as music director at KSJO, which shared the San Francisco Bay Area market's highest-rated album-oriented rock station status with San Jose's KOME during the late 1970s, Tawn had a profound impact on the fate of hard rock, punk, new wave and later heavy metal music at KNAC, where the subsequent Los Angeles metal band scene gave birth to artists like Ratt, Mötley Crüe, Gun's N'Roses et al.

As music director and DJ at KSJO, Tawn selected new artists for the station's catalogue. The station's format required DJs to play established artists after commercial breaks, but otherwise allowed for the inclusion of various genres. During this period, Tawn played 1970s hard rock bands such as Montrose, Sammy Hagar, Rick Derringer, and Van Halen, as well as AC/DC, Judas Priest, The Scorpions, Thin Lizzy, new wave, and punk rock artists.

"Breaking" AC/DC

Mastrey was one of the first DJs to play AC/DC in the US after Bill Bartlett, program director of WPDQ FM/WAIV in Jacksonville, led the way. When available only as import albums, AC/DC's first albums High Voltage (Aus.) (1975), T.N.T. (1975), and Dirty Deeds Done Dirt Cheap (Aus.) (1976) were immediately added for airplay following the successful heavy airplay of High Voltage (Int.) (1976) which always summoned a flood of listener telephone requests. Soon after several in-studio and on-air appearances by the band that preceded their first US tour, Tawn with KSJO developed a close relationship with AC/DC's Angus Young and Bon Scott, who returned for several personal appearances around KSJO's San Jose market, appearing in the KSJO Rock "n" Roll Circus.

Nurturing newborn punk and new wave music

In 1976, after sensational news reports about violence and obscenity attributed to the punk rock phenomenon created a fear and panic in the already disco-threatened world of rock music, artists like The Sex Pistols, The Ramones, and The Clash, along with early new wave artists, were shunned and denied airplay by most commercial rock stations in the United States. While continuing to feature hard rock and heavy metal during the height of the Disco era, Tawn Mastrey's KSJO also championed punk and new wave artists like The Ramones, The Clash, The Police and Devo giving them rare, vital airplay while showcasing them with on-air studio appearances prior to their eventual popularity on newly formed alternative rock stations in the early 1980s.

Breaking "Roxanne" By The Police

There is also evidence that with Tawn Mastrey as music director, KSJO was the first commercial station to add the import single of "Roxanne" by The Police. After first being played on KSJO's Sunday evening new wave Outcasts Hour, the single was added by Tawn and first played by Paul "The Lobster" Wells on his regular shift in 1978.

Helping to popularize heavy metal bands in the 1980s

In the Los Angeles market, which was arguably ground zero and home base for the heavy metal bands of the 1980s, her influence as the Leather Nun at KNAC also preserved hard rock bands like The Scorpions and help popularize heavy metal artists like Mötley Crüe from the mid-1980s, through the mid-1990s alternative rock takeover of the airwaves.

== Illness ==
Mastrey died October 2, 2007, in Minneapolis at the age of 53. She had been suffering from the effects of hepatitis C, which she contracted as a child. She left her Hair Nation show in June, 2007, when she became too ill to work. In July 2007, a number of metal musicians staged a benefit concert to raise money for an anticipated liver transplant, and to help raise awareness of the need for organ donations, through support for the nonprofit group Tawn Mastrey Foundation
