= Litmus Green =

American hardcore punk band

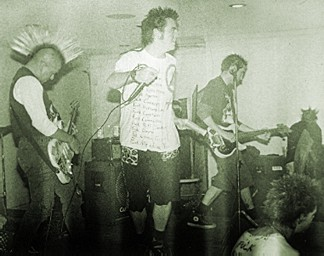

Background information
- Origin: Southern California, United States
- Genres: Hardcore punk
- Years active: 1991–present
- Labels: Green Boy Music, Cargo Music/Tackle Box, Saint Thomas Records
- Members: Rev. Sean (vocals); Larry (guitar); Adam V (bass); Antonio Val Hernandez (drums)
- Past members: Ed (guitar); Rick (drums); Mateo (bass); Nick (bass); CK (bass); Mike (bass)

Litmus Green are an American hardcore punk band from Southern California, United States, who played from 1991-2002 and 2009–2017. They play short, fast political themed songs. They were featured in the award winning documentary The Decline of Western Civilization III. Litmus Green reunited 2022 with new member Adam V on bass.

== History ==
The Litmus Green formed in 1991 from the remnants of a band called Media Children, in which Rev. Sean, Ed, and Rick were group members and Mateo was a friend/roadie.

In September 2001, Larry (Resist & Exist) joined as a second guitarist. Litmus Green played what was thought would be the "last" show in October 2002, with Ron Martinez (Final Conflict, 46 Short) filling in on bass, at the Showcase Theatre in Corona, CA.

In 2009 the band was asked to get back together for a few shows. Things went well so the band decided to keep going. Nick (Jack’s Cold Sweat and an old Litmus roadie) joined on bass in mid 2010. In early 2013, Rick decided to hang up the drum sticks and Antonio Val joined as drummer that July.

== Discography ==
1992 Demo
Hulk Smash
Mother Fuckin' Messiah
Circle That A (1995)
Do You Fear Something? (1996)
It Must Suck to Be You (1998)
Cockring (1999)
More Than Animals (2015)
S.O.P. (2020)
