= The Newlydeads =

American industrial rock band

Background information
- Origin: Los Angeles, California, U.S.
- Genre: Industrial rock
- Years active: 1997–2006
- Labels: Mutiny, Cleopatra
- Website: www.newlydeads.com

The Newlydeads were an American industrial rock band founded by Faster Pussycat singer Taime Downe. At one time or another, it also featured Downe's Faster Pussycat bandmates: guitarist Xristian Simon, bassist Danny Nordahl, and drummer Chad Stewart. It also featured former Bang Tango bassist Kyle Kyle at one point.

The Newlydeads released two studio albums (The Newlydeads and Dead End), as well as a remix album (Re-Bound) and a compilation album (Dreams from a Dirt Nap). They also contributed to at least two compilation albums. Their song "Lipstick" appeared on the 2002 release Heat Slick Records Compilation. The 2007 Cleopatra release Industrial Masters includes The Newlydeads' cover of the Nine Inch Nails song "Terrible Lie".

Taime Downe still performs Newlydeads songs with Faster Pussycat.

== Discography ==
- The Newlydeads (1997)
- Re-Bound (1998)
- Dead End (2001)
- Dreams from a Dirt Nap (2006)
