= Melrose Avenue =

Thoroughfare in Los Angeles, United States

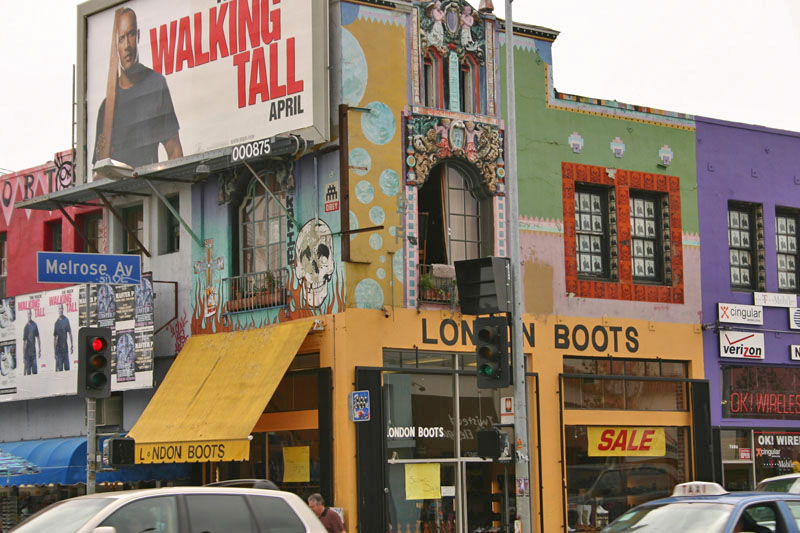
A view of a part of the eastern end of the Melrose Avenue District in April 2004.

Melrose Avenue (sometimes referred to simply as "Melrose") is a shopping, dining and entertainment destination in Los Angeles, California, starting at Santa Monica Boulevard at the border between Beverly Hills and West Hollywood, and ending at Lucile Avenue in Silver Lake. To the south of Melrose Avenue is Beverly Boulevard and to the north is Santa Monica Boulevard. Paved in 1909, Melrose Avenue's namesake comes from the Massachusetts town of the same name.

Its most famous section, known as the Melrose District, is the West End through West Hollywood and the Fairfax District. At the corner of Fairfax and Melrose is Fairfax High School, home of the Melrose Trading Post swap meet. One of the most famous landmarks located on Melrose Avenue is Paramount Pictures, founded by Adolph Zukor in 1912. Metro Local line 10 operates on Melrose Avenue. Cosmo Lombino, a New York-born designer known as the "Queen of Melrose", owns three boutiques located on Melrose Avenue. Actress Julie Newmar, as a real estate investor in the 1970s, is considered to have been a significant contributor to the areas development.

== History ==
=== Early history ===
The company of Paramount Pictures was founded on 8 May 1912 and became a major force in developing as well as establishing both nationwide and international distribution system for films, Paramount became the first successful nationwide distributor in the world. A petition signed by voters in the Melrose addition was presented to the city council of Los Angeles in February 1922, requesting annexation to the city. The Melrose Annexation was effective June 16, 1922. The area was 0.67 square miles, generally along Melrose Avenue, from Sweetzer Avenue to the west, east to June Street.

An often-stated theory of the origin of the name "Melrose" is that Elmanson Avery McCarthy, a real estate developer, named the street after his parents’ birthplace, Melrose, Massachusetts; however his parents came from Oswego, New York and it was McCarthy’s father James who developed the area and named the street. There are other claims that Melrose Avenue is named after another person, Richard Melrose - an attorney who had major relations to the city of Los Angeles.

=== 1980–2000s ===
Melrose Avenue gained traction and became a fashion mecca for punk rock influenced clothing and lifestyle. Ranging from different shops such as Koala Blue (Olivia Newton John's boutique) to the iconic "The Burger That Ate L.A." eatery located where the current Starbucks is located. Other retailers such as Retail Slut, Neo80, LA Eyeworks, Off the Wall, Caffé Luna, and many more increased on Melrose.

Culturally, this period was the height of Melrose with increasing boutiques, restaurants, retail, fashion influence, and the prominence of fashion and art within the district.

=== 2000s–2020 ===
In the 2010s, Melrose Avenue saw a decline in foot traffic with empty retail buildings and less foot traffic. During this time, stores such as Aaardvarks, other boutiques and long standing restaurants closed due to the struggle of the changing retail environment.

=== 2020–present ===
Melrose District is still one of the prominent retail districts in Los Angeles along with Rodeo Drive, La Brea Shopping District, and Santa Monica. Melrose currently hosts a variety of trendy cafe's including Urth Cafe, Lalaland Kind Cafe, Olive and James Cafe Tea, and many more. Different thrift stores such as Wasteland, 2nd Street Melrose, Melrose Trading Post, Crossroads, American Vintage, American Rebel, and Buffalo Exchange hold a majority stake in the Melrose Avenue atmosphere today.

== Melrose district ==
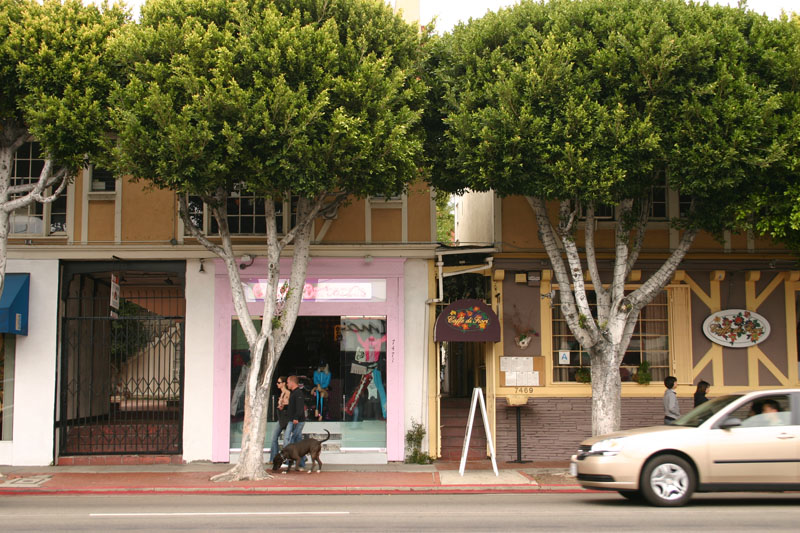
Another view of Melrose Avenue

The eastern end of the district, which runs from Fairfax to Highland Avenue, became a popular underground and new wave shopping area in the early 1980s and a centerpoint for the new wave and punk subcultures. The avenue has appeared in various films and television shows, including Entourage, LA Ink, Melrose Place and the "Jaywalking" public interaction segments of The Tonight Show with Jay Leno.

Many stores and businesses have made their homes in the district, including Retail Slut and a large outdoor flea market called the Melrose Trading Post. At the corner of Highland and Melrose is what has been described by the Los Angeles Times as the "boss of LA's Italian dining scene", Osteria Mozza, which marks the eastern end of the Fairfax District. Much of the area is managed by the Melrose Avenue Business Improvement District.

== Melrose Heights ==
The Western End, popularly referred to as Melrose Heights, runs from La Cienega Blvd. to Fairfax Avenue and features a variety of upscale establishments, such as various hair salons and wellness spas (such as Elixir), The Bodhi Tree (metaphysical and New Age bookstore), Fred Segal, Plush Home and the comedy clubs The Improv and The Groundlings. Most famously the area is known for its high-end designer stores and boutiques, including Alexander McQueen, Balenciaga, BCBG Max Azria, Carolina Herrera, Diane von Fürstenberg, Diesel, Homa Bridal, John Varvatos, Marc Jacobs, Mulberry, Oscar de la Renta, Paul Smith, Sergio Rossi, Temperley London, Vera Wang and Vivienne Westwood, amongst others.

== Melrose Place ==
Near its intersection with La Cienega Boulevard is Melrose Place, a branch of the main avenue made famous thanks to the soap opera of the same name. In reality, Melrose Place features no residences and has, historically, been home to antique shops, smaller boutiques, and hair and nail salons. Melrose Place runs entirely within the Los Angeles city limits, just outside of the West Hollywood city limits and is the venue of a popular Farmers Market on Sundays.

== La Cienega design quarter ==
The area of Melrose Avenue that intersects La Cienega Boulevard and its satellite streets is part of the La Cienega Design Quarter. Its businesses feature many antique and furniture stores, rug sellers, accessories and artisans. The popular Vito Pizza restaurant and the Belmont is also situated here.

== Cultural impact ==
=== Film ===
Melrose Avenue has been commonly filmed at as it depicts a young vibrant mood and is conveniently located in Los Angeles, the city of Hollywood. Some films featuring Melrose Avenue include: Her (2013) - exterior shots filmed in Fairfax/Melrose area, Mullholland Drive (2001) - exterior shots of Melrose store fronts, Clueless (1995) - Cher and Dionne shop in the Melrose boutique district.

=== Music ===
The romanticization of Melrose Avenue continues in song lyrics in top charting songs. Promise by Laufey "Standing out on Melrose Avenue," The Most Beautiful Thing by Bruno Major "Or find ourselves on Melrose Avenue," She Pretty by YG "Rodeo Drive or Melrose Avenue".

An Australian pop metal band took their name from Melrose Avenue. They formed in 2021 and have continuously released singles since 2022. Their most recent as the main artist, “Cemetery Friend” (also a collaboration with The Funeral Portrait), was released in June 2026.

=== Art ===
Melrose Arts District is a district managed by the Melrose Avenue Business Improvement District. There are different retailers on Melrose Avenue that promote smaller, growing artists, such as 7811 Gallery, Fabian Perez Gallery, Gladstone Gallery, HVW8 Gallery.

There are many theater related groups including Greenway Court Theatre, Groundlings, Matrix Theatre, and Zephyr Theatre that train and produce theater professionals in LA.

Melrose Avenue also hosts a variety of street murals throughout the district. There are a total of 19 locations with street art throughout the main Melrose Avenue from Fairfax to Highland. These murals include athletes (Kobe Bryant), Pink Panther, Dragons, Eyes, and many other designs.

== Zoning and permitting ==
Zoning from La Cienega Boulevard to La Brea Avenue. Source: Zimas

The main shopping district of Melrose Avenue is zoned as C4 (heavy commercial zone) zoning from La Cienega Boulevard to Fairfax Avenue. C4 zoning provides heavy commercial zoning for higher density buildings for more commercial space such as retail.

Beginning from Fairfax Avenue to La Brea Avenue is zoned as C2 (general commercial zone) zoning. C2 zoning allows for less than 4,500 square feet per business to be operated.

Both up to two blocks north and south of Melrose Avenue, land is mainly zoned as R1 (single family residential) or R2 (two-dwelling units per lot residential), which are both residential zoning codes for both single family homes and duplexes.

For further recommended actions from the Department of City Planning, check Recommendation Report in references.

== Sources ==
- Media related to Melrose Avenue at Wikimedia Commons
- Melrose Avenue Official Guide
- Huffington Post - October 8 2010
