= Retail Slut =

Clothing store in Los Angeles, California

- Industry: Clothing
- Founded: 1983
- Founder: Helen O'Neill
- Headquarters: Los Angeles, California, U.S.
- Products: Punk, goth, and underground fashion

Retail Slut was a clothing store in Los Angeles, California that specialized in punk, goth, and underground fashions. Founded in 1983 by Helen O'Neill, the store heavily supported the underground scenes such as the S&M, drag and rave communities and participated in "Hands Around the World." Retail Slut was located on Melrose Avenue and changed locations along the avenue four times throughout its history. It closed on March 31, 2005.

Retail Slut was briefly featured in the film Hollywood Vampyr, starring Trevor Goddard, Nora Zimmett, Jeff Marchelletta, Mark Irvingsen and Muse Watson, as well as in The Lollipop Generation by G.B. Jones, with owner Helen O'Neill appearing on-screen as herself. O'Neill was an original member of the band Afro Sisters, which was fronted by performance artist Vaginal Davis. TV appearances include MTV and Playboy TV. Hardrock guitarist Slash stole his first signature top hat at Retail Slut during Guns N' Roses' take-off year. Billy Idol, Cyndi Lauper, Axl Rose and Nina Hagen were regular patrons. Magnus Walker (Serious Clothing) accidentally got his start when employee Taime Downe from Faster PussyCat wanted to buy the pants off him. Andy Warhol included a photo of the Dead Barbie Doll art piece that hung above the first location's dressing room in his America book. Michael Jackson purchased the bondage belt and bracelet that appears on his BAD album cover.

In 2021 Lethal Amounts Gallery presented a Retail Slut pop-up event.
