= The Power and the Glory Hole =

Studio album by Faster Pussycat
- Released: July 13, 2006
- Genre: Industrial rock
- Length: 46:45
- Label: Full Effect Records
- Producer: Taime Downe

Faster Pussycat chronology
| Between the Valley of the Ultra Pussy (2001) | The Power and the Glory Hole (2006) | Front Row for the Donkey Show (2009) |

Professional ratings
Review scores
| Source | Rating |
|---|---|
| Allmusic | 3.5/5 stars |

The Power and the Glory Hole is the fourth studio album by Faster Pussycat released on July 13, 2006, by Full Effect Records. The songs mix industrial rock with the band's traditional sound. Singer Taime Downe was the only member returning from previous Faster Pussycat original albums.

Downe asked fans to submit audio clips of their farewells to "Bianca Butthole" for the track "Bye Bye Bianca", which is a tribute to the band Betty Blowtorch.

== Track listing ==
| No. | Title | Writer(s) | Length |
|---|---|---|---|
| 1. | "Number 1 with a Bullet" | Taime Downe | 3:39 |
| 2. | "Gotta Love It" | Taime, Danny Nordahl | 4:14 |
| 3. | "Useless" | Taime | 5:14 |
| 4. | "Sex Drugs & Rock-n-Roll" | Taime, Nordahl | 4:04 |
| 5. | "Disintegrate" | Mercury | 4:42 |
| 6. | "These Boots Were Made for Walking" (Nancy Sinatra cover) | Lee Hazlewood | 3:35 |
| 7. | "Hey You" | Taime | 3:10 |
| 8. | "Porn Star" | Taime | 4:30 |
| 9. | "The Power & the Glory Hole" | Taime, Nordahl | 4:29 |
| 10. | "Shut Up & Fuck" (Betty Blowtorch cover) | Betty Blowtorch | 2:14 |
| 11. | "Bye Bye Bianca" | Taime | 6:44 |
| Total length: | | | 46:45 |

== Personnel ==
Faster Pussycat

- Taime Downe – lead vocals, guitar, programming
- Xristian Simon – guitar, vocals
- Danny Nordahl – bass guitar, vocals
- Chad Stewart – drums, vocals

Additional musicians

- Marc Diamond – lead guitar on "These Boots Were Made for Walking", "The Power & the Glory Hole", "Shut Up & Fuck"
- Ed Mundell – lead guitar on "Number 1 with a Bullet", "Sex Drugs & Rock-n-Roll", "Disintegrate"
- C.C. DeVille – lead guitar on "Hey You"
- Dregen – guitar on "Disintegrate"
- Charlie Paulson – guitar on "Gotta Love It"
- Todd Miller – guitar on "Porn Star"
- Blag the Ripper – vocals on "Porn Star", "Shut Up & Fuck"
- Roxy Saint – vocals on "Porn Star", "The Power & the Glory Hole"
- Angela Bruyere – vocals on "Bye Bye Bianca"
- Martin Straede – vocals on "Bye Bye Bianca"
- Tommy Nordahl – vocals on "Disintegrate", "These Boots Were Made for Walking"
- Emma Calcara – vocals on "Hey You"
- Melissa Jean – vocals on "Hey You"
- Coyote Shivers – vocals on "Shut Up & Fuck"
- Wendy Gadzuk – vocals on "Shut Up & Fuck"
- Chloe – sex talk on "Porn Star"
- Plenty Uptopp – sex talk on "Porn Star"

== Singles ==
- "Number One with a Bullet"
