= The Decline of Western Civilization Part II: The Metal Years =

1988 film by Penelope Spheeris

- Dave Mustaine of Megadeth is featured on the movie poster.
- Directed by: Penelope Spheeris
- Produced by: Jonathan Dayton; Valerie Faris; Guy J. Louthan
- Starring: Alice Cooper; Ozzy Osbourne; Poison; Aerosmith; Kiss; Motörhead; Megadeth; Faster Pussycat; Lizzy Borden; London; Odin; Seduce
- Cinematography: Jeff Zimmerman
- Edited by: Earl Ghaffari
- Distributed by: New Line Cinema
- Release date: June 17, 1988
- Running time: 93 minutes
- Country: United States
- Language: English
- Budget: $500,000
- Box office: $373,743

The Decline of Western Civilization Part II: The Metal Years is a 1988 documentary film directed by Penelope Spheeris. Filmed between August 1987 and February 1988, the film chronicles the late 80s Los Angeles heavy metal scene. It is the second film of a trilogy by Spheeris depicting life in Los Angeles at various points in time as seen through the eyes of struggling up-and-coming musicians.

The first film, The Decline of Western Civilization (1981), dealt with the hardcore punk rock scene during 1979–1980. The third film, The Decline of Western Civilization Part III (1998), chronicled the gutter punk lifestyle of homeless teenagers in 1996–1997.

The film features a mix of live concert footage and interviews with prominent heavy metal performers such as Alice Cooper, Kiss, Lemmy, Aerosmith, Ozzy Osbourne, Poison, Megadeth, and W.A.S.P. Several smaller club bands are featured, such as London, Odin and Seduce. Additionally, the film was also originally going to feature Guns N' Roses (who are referenced by name in the film). However, they were replaced at the last minute with Seduce, who had recently been signed to a record label owned by one of the film's production companies.

== Background and synopsis ==
Through interviews, the film looks at the culture of heavy metal music, and chronicles the heavy metal club scene in Los Angeles during the 1987-88 time period. It uses a wide definition of metal, giving an emphasis on lighter bands from the glam metal subgenre, alongside some older artists from the 1970s, and more extreme metal music like Megadeth. The film itself states that heavy metal was a natural evolution of earlier music of the 1970s, unlike punk rock, which the film's 1981 predecessor focused on. In their interviews, artists such as Aerosmith and Alice Cooper discuss how they helped to pioneer the modern metal scene of the 1980s. In his interview, Gene Simmons of Kiss humorously reflected on their status as an early pioneer, by saying "when we first started doing this stuff, we didn't really talk about headbanging, we talked about girlbanging or gangbanging". While the film features well-known artists such as Alice Cooper, Aerosmith, Lemmy, Ozzy Osbourne, Gene Simmons and Paul Stanley, many of the newer artists interviewed were small unsigned L.A. club bands, and they are given a share of the spotlight, including London and Odin. Some of the more established modern L.A. bands that were featured include Faster Pussycat, Megadeth, Poison, Tuff, Vixen, and W.A.S.P.. The film's soundtrack album also included non-L.A. bands that were playing a heavier style of metal similar to Megadeth, such as Metal Church and Rigor Mortis. Many of the film's struggling, unsigned acts appear convinced that worldwide stardom awaits them, and most appear to have no backup plan in place should this success fail to happen. Several of these musicians mention that they've never had a real job in their lives or that they despise working.

The film discusses how L.A. glam metal bands experimented with feminine makeup and hairstyles purely as a means to attract women, rather than as a form of gender expression, with one of the female metal fans interviewed saying, "it brings out the bisexual tendencies, because women do like women, no matter what people say". Artists interviewed who were less associated with the L.A. glam aesthetic try to distance themselves from this behavior, like Dave Mustaine of Megadeth, Aerosmith, Lemmy of Motörhead and W.A.S.P.'s Chris Holmes. Mustaine claimed, "we've never gone out and put lipstick on and stuff like that, and put hairspray so it looks like there's a truck blowing past us." Joe Perry of Aerosmith said, "it's theatrical effect, I guess it's cool, it's when they wear it offstage and try to pat you on the ass [that] it worries me. Or sometimes it worries me." At one point, Aerosmith singer Steven Tyler even humorously mumbles the chorus of their 1987 song "Dude (Looks Like a Lady)" to Perry during their interview, with this song being written after they mistook a member of glam metal band Mötley Crüe for a woman. Smaller artists interviewed recount stories such as getting aroused by having women help with their makeup, while the members of Poison talked about how some accused them of only getting successful by jumping on the glam bandwagon. The film also addressed how broke musicians in the L.A. metal scene lived off female acquaintances and relied on them for things such as food and housing, with Poison drummer Rikki Rockett admitting that his band were once guilty of this. A member of the all-female metal band Jaded Lady labels this behavior "sad", and says she would never have a man pay for all her things. Others in the film consider this behavior to be a form of male prostitution.

The film features interviews with club owners who hosted L.A. metal bands, including Riki Rachtman and Bill Gazzarri, whose Gazzari's club on the Sunset Strip used to host Van Halen when they were still an unknown band. In 1990, Rachtman would become the host of MTV's metal program Headbanger's Ball. The film also includes several interview segments with Darlyne Pettinicchio, an Orange County probation officer, discussing the dangers of metal culture on children, especially in taking heavy metal lyrics seriously and literally. Artists and fans interviewed in the film discuss particular elements of metal culture, such as the devil horn hand gesture.

The film is well known for its many scenes featuring rock star excess:

- An extremely intoxicated Chris Holmes of W.A.S.P. is interviewed in a swimming pool, with his mother by his side. He stumbles through the interview, proclaiming himself "a full-blown alcoholic" and "a piece of crap" while pouring what appears to be vodka over himself. Holmes also talks about how he gets groups of women ejected from his hotel room by security if they don't take their clothes off for him. When Spheeris asks Holmes' mother what she thinks about this, she replies "I don't think about it".
- In a hot tub surrounded by scantily dressed young women, Odin lead vocalist Randy O insists his band will become millionaires, more famous than The Doors and be "bigger than Zeppelin". He says that the possibility of superstardom eluding him causes him to ponder suicide. Spheeris asks why he wears assless chaps while performing live, and he says that it "ventilates my scrotum". When the women in the hot tub are asked why they spend their time with this band, they reply "because they have good music. And cause they're good looking".
- The "sexy rock and roll" dance contests at Gazzarri's are presented as being sleazy and sexist. Gazzarri is interviewed with two young blonde women beside him, and brags about how he loves being around 18 year old girls despite being much older, comparing himself to three 20 year old men. He also notes that he sometimes mistakes the male members of bands for women due to the way they dress, and that whenever this happens it makes him want to go back to the 18 year old girls.
- The audience at Gazzarri's, which includes members of bands, are shown to be angered when Gazzarri announces that no G-strings or bikinis are allowed after one of the dancers turns up to a contest like this. Members of London are excited when they realize a dancer is wearing no underwear beneath her dress and they can see her pubic hair, with one of the London members yelling "we have muff!".
- Riki Rachtman and Taime Downe, owners of the Cathouse club in L.A., discuss how girls get entry to the club faster if they dress "sleazy", and how they never turn on the air conditioning, so girls will eventually have to take off some of their clothes. Rachtman also talks about how he only started the club as a way to pick up women.
- One of the unsigned musicians says that his preferred type of women are "slutty girls" that "will take off all their clothes right in front of me and dance in my face".
- There are discussions with various musicians about the way women in general, and groupies in particular, are treated badly in the metal scene.
- Paul Stanley of Kiss is interviewed in bed, surrounded by three half-naked girls.
- Steven Tyler and Joe Perry of Aerosmith talk about spending millions of dollars on drugs. In the interview, Tyler compares Aerosmith's sustained success to someone who has learned not to ejaculate too early while masturbating. Right before this interview started, Spheeris said people came into the filming room and started searching it for drugs, believing that Tyler and Perry possibly hid drugs in areas like the cushions of the sofa.
- Ozzy Osbourne, while cooking breakfast in a kitchen, discusses his wild rock and roll lifestyle. In a scene that was later revealed to have been manipulated in post-production, he spills orange juice all over the table, apparently due to uncontrollable shakes. Spheeris also interviews him about sobriety.
- An interview with Lemmy from Motörhead. In his autobiography, he claims that Spheeris interviewed him from a distance, possibly in an attempt to make him look stupid.
- There are candid and sobering interviews from various artists about drug use, abuse, and dying, or nearly dying, from overdoses.
- Spheeris takes her cameras to Sunset Strip to film the nightlife in 1980s Los Angeles.

The film ends with a live performance of the Megadeth song "In My Darkest Hour", from their 1988 album So Far, So Good... So What!. The song was about the recent road accident death of Cliff Burton, who was a bassist for San Francisco Bay Area band Metallica. Towards the end of the film, the members of Megadeth talk about how they don't want to fall into the trap of just being another band recounting stories of a wild drug-filled lifestyle. A 2001 episode of VH1's Behind the Music later focused on Megadeth and the shooting of their scenes for this film. Ironically, the members noted that the So Far, So Good... So What! era was by far the most drug-fueled era in the band's history, despite what the members said in the film.

== Musical performances ==
- Lizzy Borden – "Born to be Wild"
- Faster Pussycat – "Cathouse", "Bathroom Wall"
- Seduce – "Crash Landing", "Colleen"
- London – "Breakout", "Russian Winter"
- Odin – "Little Gypsy", "12 O'Clock High"
- Megadeth – "In My Darkest Hour"

== Reception ==
In his review, Luca Cimarusti of the Chicago Reader stated that the film "focuses on the kind of extravagance that the kids in the first film were rebelling against", adding that it had "unforgettably ridiculous interviews, [like] Ozzy Osborne discussing the mundanity of sobriety while cooking breakfast, Steven Tyler bragging about putting millions of dollars up his nose [and] Chris Holmes of W.A.S.P. chugging messily from a bottle of vodka in his pool while his mom looks on." Nathan Jolly of The Guardian said that the film was more reminiscent of the mockumentary This Is Spinal Tap when compared to its predecessor. In his 2018 book 100 Greatest Cult Films, Christopher J. Olson also likened the film to This Is Spinal Tap, writing that it "reveals the ridiculousness that lies beneath the surface of heavy metal's shallow celebration of excess". In March 2003, Pete Vonder Haar of Film Threat said that if the film had only focused on the "elder statesmen of metal" rather than the newer bands, then it would have been comparable to the VH1 documentary series Behind the Music, saying "Decline could almost be regarded as a historical piece. Here we have some of the biggest names in metal ruminating on their fans and success, sort of like a Behind the Music episode without all the annoying self-pity and life affirmation. [But] then we meet the newer 'up and coming' bands."

The film was generally well-received by the metal community, with Metal Hammer calling it a "classic car crash metal documentary", and Metal Injection describing it as "one of the most must-see documentaries in metal culture." The film received its own entry in the 2009 book The Encyclopedia of Heavy Metal, by Brian Cogan and William Phillips. They wrote that the film "will probably be remembered primarily as a document of unbridled excess".

In 2015, VH1 included it on a list of "The 15 Greatest Hard Rock And Heavy Metal Documentaries", while the British Film Institute included it on a 2019 list titled "10 Great Films for Metal Fans".

=== Influence and legacy ===
It has been claimed, most notably in the VH1 documentary series Heavy: The Story of Metal, that this film was partially responsible for the death of glam metal, and the subsequent rise of thrash metal and grunge during the next decade. The suggestion in the documentary is that fans, disgusted by the scenes of excess, decided to turn elsewhere. A similar claim was made by Dave Mustaine in his autobiography and in the book Hell Bent for Leather by author Seb Hunter. One of the film's artists, Poison's Bret Michaels, later went on to star in his own VH1 dating series Rock of Love (2007), which explored similar themes of excess.

Spheeris noted that Christina Applegate modelled the dumb blonde persona of her Married... with Children character Kelly after an exotic dancer in the film named Cindy. This woman said that she wanted to continue on with her "actressing" career after winning a dancing contest at Gazzari's. Applegate herself had earlier confirmed on Twitter that Kelly's eventual personality was inspired by one of the women from the film, with the show having already been on the air for a year when the film premiered. Spheeris later reflected that the women featured in the film were "ridiculous", adding "if punk rock made a couple strides toward raising up the perception of women, then heavy metal made six strides backwards".

=== Faked footage ===
In a 1999 interview for The A.V. Club, Spheeris admitted that the scene with Ozzy Osbourne spilling orange juice was faked, and the kitchen was not Osbourne's. A more complete version of the interview, in which Osbourne does not spill juice, is included as a bonus feature on the DVD. The 2015 box set release of the three Decline films includes a commentary track for Part II that states that some of the scenes involving Osbourne and Holmes were faked. The commentary states that Paul Stanley being interviewed with women in his bed was staged, and that the initial women they got were not sexy enough for him, which led to them seeking women from the Playboy Mansion. It was also claimed that Holmes being interviewed beside his mother was not staged, and that it came about naturally.

== Soundtrack ==
The soundtrack was released on Capitol Records/I.R.S. Records. However, the soundtrack does not attempt to feature all the performances that were in the movie. In his review, Tom Forget of AllMusic praised the album for giving equal attention to the more underground metal scenes of the late 1980s, unlike the film, which mainly focused on the high-profile L.A. metal scene.

The Decline of Western Civilization Part II: The Metal Years (Original Motion Picture Soundtrack)

Soundtrack album by various artists
- Released: 1988
- Genres: Heavy metal, thrash metal
- Label: Capitol/I.R.S.
- Producer: Various

Professional ratings
Review scores
Source	Rating
AllMusic	4.5/5 stars

=== Track listing ===
No.	Title	Writer(s)	Performed by	Length
1.	"Gene Simmons Speaks"		Gene Simmons	0:03
2.	"Under My Wheels" (originally performed by Alice Cooper)	Michael Bruce, Dennis Dunaway, Bob Ezrin	Alice Cooper featuring Axl Rose, Slash & Izzy Stradlin from Guns N' Roses	3:16
3.	"Bathroom Wall (Live)"	Taime Downe	Faster Pussycat	3:51
4.	"Cradle to the Grave"		Motörhead	4:07
5.	"You Can Run But You Can't Hide"		Armored Saint	3:03
6.	"Born to Be Wild (Live)" (originally performed by Steppenwolf)	Mars Bonfire	Lizzy Borden	4:30
7.	"Alice Cooper Speaks"		Alice Cooper	0:20
8.	"Rikki Rockett Speaks"		Rikki Rockett	0:08
9.	"In My Darkest Hour"		Megadeth	6:17
10.	"Prophecy (Demo Version)"		Queensrÿche	3:50
11.	"The Brave"		Metal Church	4:26
12.	"Foaming at the Mouth"		Rigor Mortis	3:45
13.	"Colleen (Live)"		Seduce	2:58
14.	"Steven Tyler Speaks"		Steven Tyler	0:24

=== CD track listing ===
No.	Title	Writer(s)	Performed by	Length
1.	"Under My Wheels" (originally performed by Alice Cooper)	Michael Bruce, Dennis Dunaway, Bob Ezrin	Alice Cooper featuring Axl Rose, Slash & Izzy Stradlin from Guns N' Roses	3:16
2.	"Bathroom Wall (Live)"	Taime Downe	Faster Pussycat	3:51
3.	"Cradle to the Grave"		Motörhead	4:07
4.	"You Can Run But You Can't Hide"		Armored Saint	3:03
5.	"Born to Be Wild (Live)" (originally performed by Steppenwolf)	Mars Bonfire	Lizzy Borden	4:30
6.	"In My Darkest Hour"		Megadeth	6:17
7.	"Prophecy"		Queensrÿche	3:50
8.	"The Brave"		Metal Church	4:26
9.	"Foaming at the Mouth"		Rigor Mortis	3:45
10.	"Colleen (Live)"		Seduce	2:58

== See also ==
- Heavy Metal Parking Lot
- American Hardcore

General:

- List of cult films
