= Faster Pussycat (album) =

Studio album by Faster Pussycat
- Released: July 7, 1987
- Recorded: 1986–1987
- Genres: Glam metal; hard rock
- Length: 36:13
- Label: Elektra
- Producer: Ric Browde

Faster Pussycat chronology
Faster Pussycat (1987)	Wake Me When It's Over (1989)

Singles from Faster Pussycat
- 1. "Babylon" / "Smash Alley" Released: 1987; 2. "Don't Change That Song" Released: 1987; 3. "Bathroom Wall" / "Cathouse" Released: 1987

Professional ratings
Review scores
Source	Rating
AllMusic	4/5 stars
Robert Christgau	B
Melodic	4.5/5 stars

Faster Pussycat is the debut studio album by the American band of the same name. It reached number 97 on the Billboard 200 chart.

Videos were made for several of the songs on the album, including "Don't Change That Song", which had a video directed by Russ Meyer. The song "Babylon" featured scratching by one time club DJ Riki Rachtman. Riki was Taime Downe's roommate and together they opened the nightclub Cathouse. The band performed "Cathouse" and "Bathroom Wall" in the film The Decline of Western Civilization Part II: The Metal Years, and they were interviewed in the segment as well.

The album was reissued on CD by UK-based company Rock Candy Records, with expanded liner notes and photos.

In 2015, "Sleazegrinder" of Louder included the song in his list of "The 20 Greatest Hair Metal Anthems Of All Time". In 2017, Metal Hammer included the album in their list of "the 10 hair metal albums you need in your record collection". In 2018, Collin Brennan of Consequence included the album in his list of "10 Hair Metal Albums That Don’t Suck".

== Track listing ==
1. "Don't Change That Song" (Taime Downe, Greg Steele) – 3:40
2. "Bathroom Wall" (Downe) – 3:40
3. "No Room for Emotion" (Downe, Brent Muscat) – 3:56
4. "Cathouse" (Downe) – 3:42
5. "Babylon" (Downe, Steele) – 3:14
6. "Smash Alley" (Downe, Muscat) – 3:28
7. "Shooting You Down" (Downe) – 3:46
8. "City Has No Heart" (Downe, Muscat) – 4:19
9. "Ship Rolls In" (Downe, Steele) – 3:26
10. "Bottle in Front of Me" (Downe, Muscat) – 3:02

== Reception ==
In 2005, Faster Pussycat was ranked number 498 in Rock Hard magazine's book The 500 Greatest Rock & Metal Albums of All Time.

== Personnel ==
Faster Pussycat

- Taime Downe – lead vocals
- Greg Steele – guitar, backing vocals
- Brent Muscat – guitar, backing vocals
- Eric Stacy – bass guitar, backing vocals
- Mark Michals – drums, backing vocals

== Charts ==
Chart (1987)	Peak position
US Billboard 200	97
