= Penelope Spheeris =

American film director and producer (born 1945)

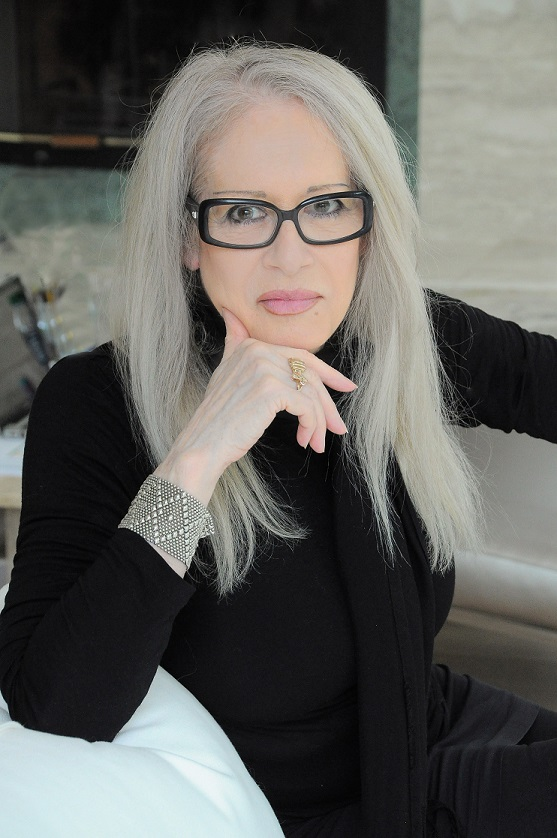
- Spheeris in 2013
- Born: December 2, 1945 (age 80); New Orleans, Louisiana, U.S.
- Education: University of California, Los Angeles
- Occupations: Film director; film producer; screenwriter
- Years active: 1968–present
- Children: Anna Fox
- Relatives: Jimmie Spheeris (brother); Chris Spheeris (cousin); Costa-Gavras (cousin)

Penelope Spheeris (born December 2, 1945) is an American filmmaker. Her best-known works include The Decline of Western Civilization trilogy of music documentaries (1981–98), each covering an aspect of Los Angeles underground culture, and has been referred to as a "rock 'n roll anthropologist". She is also known for directing the comedy films Wayne's World (1992, her highest-grossing film), Dudes (1987) and The Beverly Hillbillies (1993).

== Early life ==
Spheeris was born in New Orleans, Louisiana. Her Greek-immigrant father owned the Magic Empire Shows carnival and was a side-show strong man. Her mother, of Irish heritage, was raised in Kansas and later worked as a ticket taker for the carnival. Her father was 40 years old and her mother was 19 when they began a relationship. Spheeris has three full siblings, plus a number of older half-siblings from her father's first marriage. She is a sister of singer Jimmie Spheeris and a first cousin of musician Chris Spheeris and Greek-French film director Costa Gavras, which she says has made her consider that a genetic component exists to her vocation.

Spheeris told author Paul Stenning, "I believe each of us is born with certain characteristics that we genetically inherit, some of which are good, some not so good. My mother was extremely compassionate, my father more of a barbarian. My father was passionately ambitious, where my mother was not. The most significant traits I learned from my parents were a strong sense of survival and unfaltering tenacity."

Spheeris spent her first seven years traveling around the American South and American Midwest with her father's carnival. Her father was murdered in Troy, Alabama, after intervening in a racial dispute. In a 2015 interview, Spheeris stated that her father had come to the aid of an African-American man who had been struck on the back of the head with a cane by a white man over a dispute about cutting in front of him in line. The white man soon after returned and stabbed Spheeris' father. She states that her father's killer served no jail time, the man's legal defense apparently resting entirely on the claim that he was justified in murdering Spheeris senior as "he was defending a black."

After her father's death, Spheeris and her three siblings moved with their mother to California, generally living in trailer parks with a succession of stepfathers. She spent her teenaged years in Orange County, graduating from Westminster High School, where she was named 'most likely to succeed'. After high school, Spheeris attended California State University Long Beach, where she majored in art. She admired the teachings of George Falcon, a behavioral scientist. From his influence, Spheeris went on to study psychobiology at the University of California, Irvine, in Orange County, southeast of Los Angeles.

Working as a waitress at Denny's and IHOP, she put herself through film school. She majored in film and has a master of fine arts degree in theater arts from UCLA.

== Career ==
While at UCLA, Spheeris got her first job in the industry transcribing footage for directors Gary Weis and John Head. They introduced her to their friend Lorne Michaels, who was putting together Saturday Night Live. Michaels had signed comedian Albert Brooks to make a series of short films and hired Spheeris to produce the films and teach Brooks how to direct. Her first feature film was The Decline of Western Civilization (1981), a punk rock documentary that she produced and directed. She followed up with Suburbia in 1983, produced by Roger Corman, The Decline of Western Civilization Part II: The Metal Years, this time about the Los Angeles heavy metal scene of 1988, with footage and interviews of legendary metal bands such as Kiss, Ozzy Osbourne, Aerosmith, Megadeth, and Motörhead. She returned to the streets of Los Angeles and the punk rock scene in 1998 for the documentary The Decline of Western Civilization Part III. She was offered the chance to direct This is Spinal Tap, but declined and she was replaced by Rob Reiner instead.

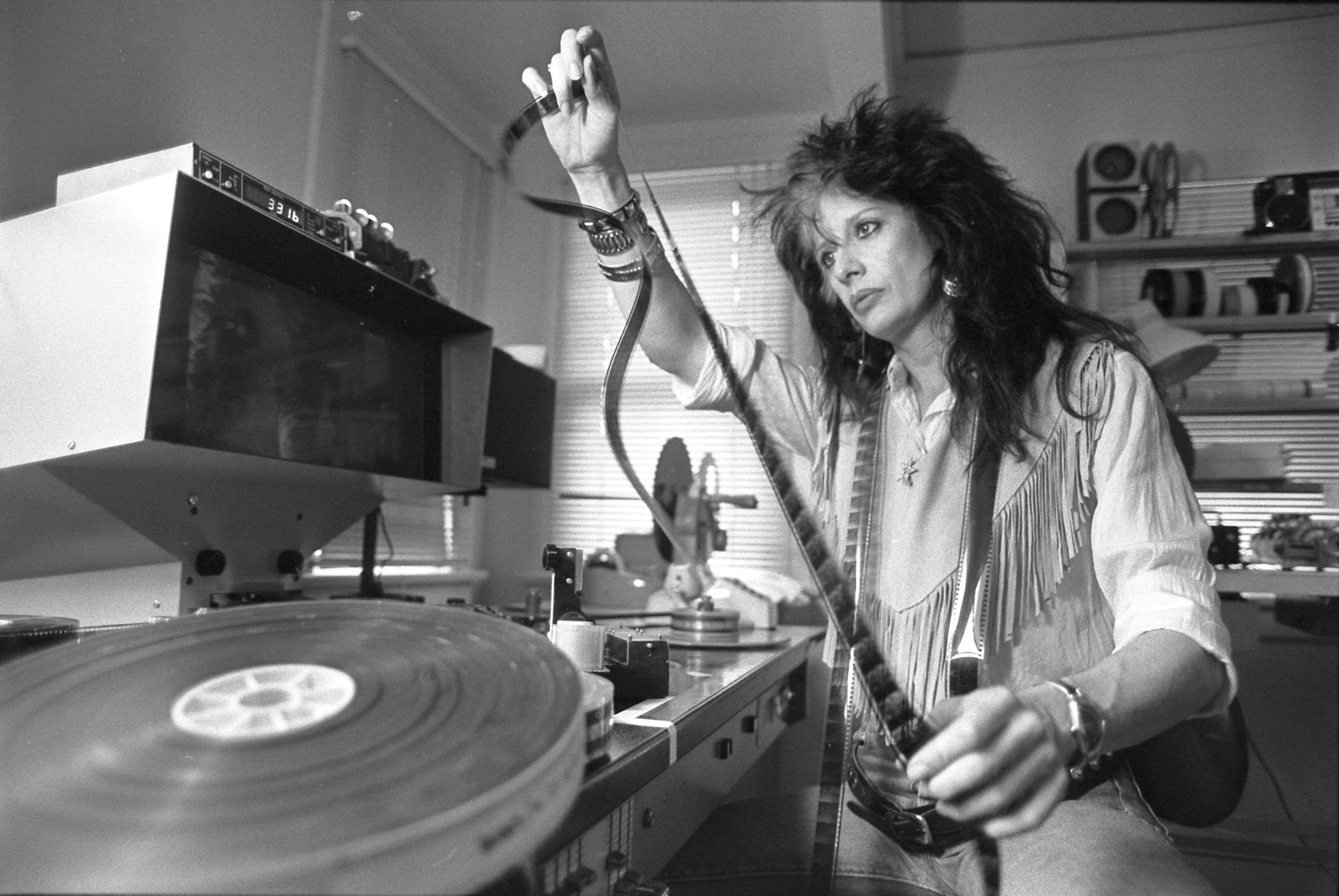
Spheeris editing her film Dudes, 1986

In addition, she worked as a writer for the television series Roseanne (1988-1997). In the 1990s, she directed Wayne's World (1992), a comedy based on Mike Myers' sketches from Saturday Night Live. The movie grossed over $183 million and became a popular hit. She directed the Wayne's World music video work for Queen's song "Bohemian Rhapsody", which earned a Grammy Award nomination. She had difficulty working with Myers, while acknowledging him as "profoundly talented," and in an Entertainment Weekly article stated she believes Myers dissuaded Paramount Pictures from hiring her for the 1993 sequel. She was replaced by Stephen Surjik.

In 1996, she directed We Sold Our Souls for Rock 'n Roll, a documentary about the Ozzfest, produced by Sharon Osbourne, which explored life on the road.

Other films Spheeris has directed include The Beverly Hillbillies; The Little Rascals (for which she co-wrote the screenplay); the Chris Farley/David Spade comedy Black Sheep; the Marlon Wayans-David Spade team-up Senseless; and The Kid & I starring Tom Arnold. In 2006, she was set to direct the still-unfilmed Gospel According to Janis about Janis Joplin.

The Portland Oregon Women's Film Festival named Spheeris its guest of honor for 2013.

The moving image collection of Penelope Spheeris is held at the Academy Film Archive. The Academy Film Archive has preserved several of Penelope Spheeris' films, including Bath, Hats Off To Hollywood, and Shit.

== Personal life ==
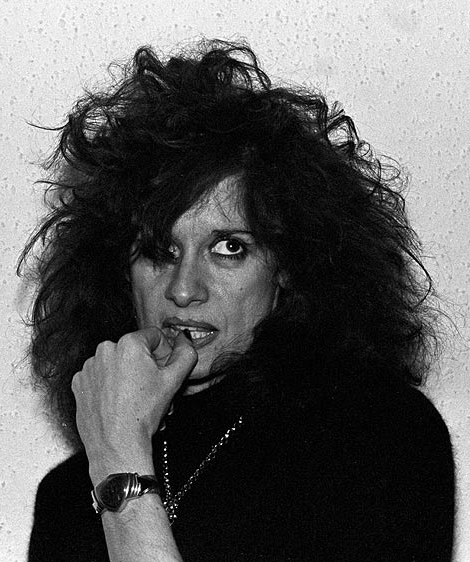
Spheeris in 1984

Spheeris has a daughter.

Since September 9, 1998, Spheeris has been in a relationship with a man known as Sin, whom she met while filming the documentary The Decline of Western Civilization Part III. In a 2015 interview, she revealed that he was in an institution in Florida after he stopped taking his medication (he has schizophrenia and bipolar disorder) and ended up in jail. She has described him as the love of her life.

== Radio and podcast appearances ==
Spheeris appeared on WTF with Marc Maron on June 29, 2015.

She appeared on Ken Reid's TV Guidance Counselor podcast on October 18, 2016.

In December 2021, she appeared on the fourteenth episode of The Ghost of Hollywood, where she discussed her work career in filmmaking, with a focus on Suburbia in particular.

An interview with Penelope Spheeris and journalist Barney Hoskyns appeared on the Rock's Backpages web site.

== Filmography ==
=== Film ===
==== Feature films ====
Year	Title	Credited as			Notes
Year	Title	Director	Producer	Writer	Notes
1969	Uncle Tom's Fairy Tales	No	Yes	No	Student film, considered lost
1972	I Don't Know	Yes	No	No	Short film
1979	Real Life	No	Yes	No	
1983	Suburbia	Yes	No	Yes	
1985	The Boys Next Door	Yes	No	No	
1986	Hollywood Vice Squad	Yes	No	No	
1987	Dudes	Yes	No	No	
1987	Summer Camp Nightmare	No	No	Yes	
1992	Wayne's World	Yes	No	No	
1993	The Beverly Hillbillies	Yes	Yes	No	
1994	The Little Rascals	Yes	No	Yes	
1996	Black Sheep	Yes	No	No	
1998	Senseless	Yes	No	No	
2005	The Kid & I	Yes	Yes	No	
2011	Balls to the Wall	Yes	No	No	

=== Television ===
Year	Title	Credited as			Notes
Year	Title	Director	Producer	Writer	Notes
1975–76	Saturday Night Live	No	Yes	No	9 episodes
1989–90	Roseanne	No	No	Yes	24 episodes (story editor); Episode: "Fender Bender" (writer)
1993	Danger Theatre	Yes	Yes	Yes	3 episodes (director); 7 episodes (executive producer); 5 episodes (writer)
2003	75th Academy Awards	Yes	Yes	No	Segment: "Tribute to Documentaries"
2004	Cracking Up	Yes	No	No	Episode: "Prom Night"

TV movies

Year	Title	Notes
1991	Prison Stories: Women on the Inside	Segment "3"
1991	Visitors from the Unknown: UFO Abductions	
1998	Applewood 911	
2000	Dear Doughboy	
2003	The Crooked E: The Unshredded Truth About Enron	
2011	Five	Segment "Cheyanne"
2012	The Real St. Nick	

=== Documentary works ===
Year	Title	Credited as			Notes
Year	Title	Director	Producer	Writer	Notes
1981	The Decline of Western Civilization	Yes	Yes	Yes	
1988	The Decline of Western Civilization Part II: The Metal Years	Yes	No	No	
1990	Thunder and Mud	Yes	No	No	
1990	Banned in the U.S.A.	Yes	No	No	
1998	The Decline of Western Civilization Part III	Yes	No	No	
1999	Hollyweird	Yes	No	No	Unreleased
2001	We Sold Our Souls for Rock 'n Roll	Yes	No	No	

=== Music videos ===
Year	Title	Artist
1987	"Wake Up Dead"	Megadeth
1988	"I Did It for Love"	Night Ranger
1989	"No More Mr. Nice Guy"	Megadeth
1992	"Bohemian Rhapsody" (Wayne's World Version)	Queen

=== Acting roles ===
Year	Title	Role	Notes
1969	Naked Angels	Shirley	
1971	The Ski Bum	Star the Witch	
1973	Brothers	Penny	
1974	The Second Coming of Suzanne	Margo, Logan's Film Group	
1989	Wedding Band	Nicky's Mom	
1992	Wayne's World		uncredited

== Unproduced projects ==
- The Thing in Bob's Garage – A script was written but never made into a film
- The Gospel According to Janis – An autobiography about Janis Joplin was developed by Spheeris for 15 years, and she had received help from David Dalton on the script. In 2004, the project finally began moving forward when singer Pink was cast in the lead role. Peter Newman had helped finance. Zooey Deschanel replaced her two years later. In 2009, Deschanel declared the project dead.
- Closers – A romantic comedy distributed by Dimension Films, written by Monica Johnson and Josh Stolberg, and produced by Kevin Messick. The plot describes a man who signs up for a secret service in order to get a girl, only to realize that they assassinated her boyfriend.
- Posers – A comedy distributed by Miramax about three guys who have to save their uncle's adult bookstore from being seized by launching their own porn site.
- Spam on Rye – An action/comedy from Franchise Pictures, written by Sal Stabile and Andrew Wasser. The plot was about a guy who steals a mobster's car to impress a date and finds himself living the life of the one he stole from. David Arquette was being looked at to star.
- Flashbacks – Based on the autobiography of the same name by Timothy Leary, produced by Interscope Communications and written by Randall Jahnson.

== Reception ==
Critical, public, and commercial reception to films Spheeris has directed.

Film	Rotten Tomatoes	Metacritic	CinemaScore	Budget	Box office
The Decline of Western Civilization	100%	93	—N/a	—N/a	—N/a
Suburbia	91%	—N/a	—N/a	—N/a	—N/a
The Decline of Western Civilization Part II: The Metal Years	86%	58	—N/a	—N/a	—N/a
Wayne's World	86%	57	A-	$20 million	$183 million
The Beverly Hillbillies	23%	37	B+	$25 million	$57.4 million
The Little Rascals	23%	45	A-	—N/a	$67.3 million
Black Sheep	28%	—N/a	B+	—N/a	$32.4 million
Senseless	6%	36	B+	—N/a	$12.8 million
The Decline of Western Civilization Part III	100%	77	—N/a	—N/a	—N/a
The Kid & I	—N/a	37	—N/a	—N/a	—N/a

== Awards and honors ==
Spheeris' work has received recognition from the Directors Guild of America, The Recording Academy, Stinkers Bad Movie Awards, the Chicago International Film Festival, the Chicago Underground Film Festival, the Deep Ellum Film Festival, the LA Femme International Film Festival, the Los Angeles Greek Film Festival, the Los Angeles Silver Lake Film Festival, the Melbourne International Film Festival, the Sundance Film Festival, and the Temecula Valley International Film Festival.

- 1983 Won - Chicago International Film Festival award - Silver Hugo for Best First Feature Film (Suburbia)
- 1992 Nominated - Grammy Award for Best Music Video - Long Form ("Bohemian Rhapsody (Wayne's World Version)")
- 1993 Won - The Stinkers Bad Movie Award for Worst Resurrection of a Television Show (The Beverly Hillbillies)
- 1998 Won - Chicago Underground Film Festival award - Jury award for Best Documentary (The Decline of Western Civilization Part III)
- 1998 Nominated - Sundance Film Festival Award - Grand Jury award for Documentary (The Decline of Western Civilization Part III)
- 1998 Won - Sundance Film Festival Award - Freedom of Expression Award (The Decline of Western Civilization Part III)
- 2001 Won - Deep Ellum Film Festival award - Pioneer Filmmaker award
- 2001 Won - Los Angeles Silver Lake Film Festival award - Spirit of Silver Lake award
- 2001 Won - Melbourne International Film Festival award - Most Popular Documentary (We Sold Our Souls for Rock 'n Roll)
- 2003 Won - Temecula Valley International Film Festival award - Lifetime Achievement Award
- 2005 Won - LA Femme International Film Festival award - Maverick Award
- 2009 Won - Los Angeles Greek Film Festival award - Honorary Award
- 2012 Nominated - Directors Guild award for Outstanding Directorial Achievement in Movies for Television/Miniseries (Five)
