= Wake Me When It's Over =

Studio album by Faster Pussycat
- Released: August 28, 1989
- Recorded: 1988–1989
- Genres: Hard rock; blues rock; glam metal
- Length: 60:42
- Label: Elektra
- Producer: John Jansen

Faster Pussycat chronology
Faster Pussycat (1987)	Wake Me When It's Over (1989)	Whipped! (1992)

Singles from Wake Me When It's Over
- 1. "Poison Ivy" / "Tattoo" Released: 1989; 2. "House of Pain" Released: 1989; 3. "When There's a Whip There's a Way" Released: 1990

Professional ratings
Review scores
Source	Rating
AllMusic	3/5 stars
Chicago Tribune	2/4 stars
The Encyclopedia of Popular Music	3/5 stars
Los Angeles Times	2/4 stars
The Rolling Stone Album Guide	3.5/5 stars
St. Petersburg Times	2/5 stars

Wake Me When It's Over is the second album by Faster Pussycat, released in 1989. The band moved away from the glam metal of their first album to a more blues-influenced sound.

Music videos were produced for "Poison Ivy" and "House of Pain". "House of Pain" reached No. 28 on the Billboard Hot 100, and the video, which was directed by future film director Michael Bay, was in rotation on MTV. The album peaked at No. 48 on the Billboard 200. The album has been certified gold by the RIAA.

== Production ==
The album was produced by John Jansen. It is marked by a heavier, less glam metal sound.

== Critical reception ==
Spin wrote that "side one is terrible, crammed with constipated glam-metal boogie, "but praised side two's "Slip of the Tongue" and "Tattoo". The St. Petersburg Times wrote that "by smoothing out the rough edges and tightening up the loose performances, Faster Pussycat has traded in its identity for a faceless, albeit commercial, sound." The Calgary Herald thought that "a pleasant surprise is "House of Pain", which is devoid of the syrupy mush that tends to dominate a lot of ballads that crack the charts." Kirk Blows of Music Week called Wake Me When It's Over worthwhile, and noticed that the album gives listeners "more adventure, variety and depth than its predecessor while retaining just enough of the reckless spirit."

== Track listing ==
No.	Title	Writer(s)	Length
1.	"Where There's a Whip, There's a Way"	Taime Downe, Brent Muscat, Greg Steele	6:44
2.	"Little Dove"	Downe, Muscat	5:05
3.	"Poison Ivy"	Downe, Eric Stacy	4:24
4.	"House of Pain"	Downe, Steele	5:47
5.	"Gonna Walk"	Downe, Muscat, Steele	4:24
6.	"Pulling Weeds"	Downe, Muscat	4:35
7.	"Slip of the Tongue"	Downe	4:32
8.	"Cryin' Shame"	Downe, Steele	4:51
9.	"Tattoo"	Downe, Muscat, Steele	4:56
10.	"Ain't No Way Around It"	Downe, Muscat, Steele	4:31
11.	"Arizona Indian Doll"	Downe, Steele	4:40
12.	"Please Dear" (not on all vinyl)	Downe, Muscat	6:25
Total length:			60:42

== Personnel ==
=== Faster Pussycat ===
- Taime Downe – lead vocal
- Greg Steele – guitar, piano, backing vocal
- Brent Muscat – guitar, percussion, backing vocal, talk box on "Little Dove"
- Eric Stacy – electric and fretless bass
- Mark Michals – drums, percussion

=== Additional musicians ===
- Emi Canyn – vocals
- Jimmy Zavala – harmonica, saxophone
- Kevin Savigar – piano and keyboards
- Steven Riley – drums, percussion, backing vocals

== Production ==
- Produced and mixed by John Jansen
- Recorded and engineered by Ryan Dorn, Ross Hogarth, John Jansen and Rod O'Brien
- Assistant engineers: Nelson Ayres, Kyle Bess, Michael Bosley and David Knight
- Mastered by Greg Calbi
- Artwork: Tony Redhead [Electric Paint]

== Charts ==
Chart (1989–1990)	Peak position
UK Albums (Official Charts)	35
US Billboard 200	48

== Certifications ==
Region	Certification	Certified units/sales
United States (RIAA)	Gold	500,000^{^}
^{^} Shipments figures based on certification alone.

== See also ==
- List of glam metal albums and songs
