= Brent Muscat =

American guitarist

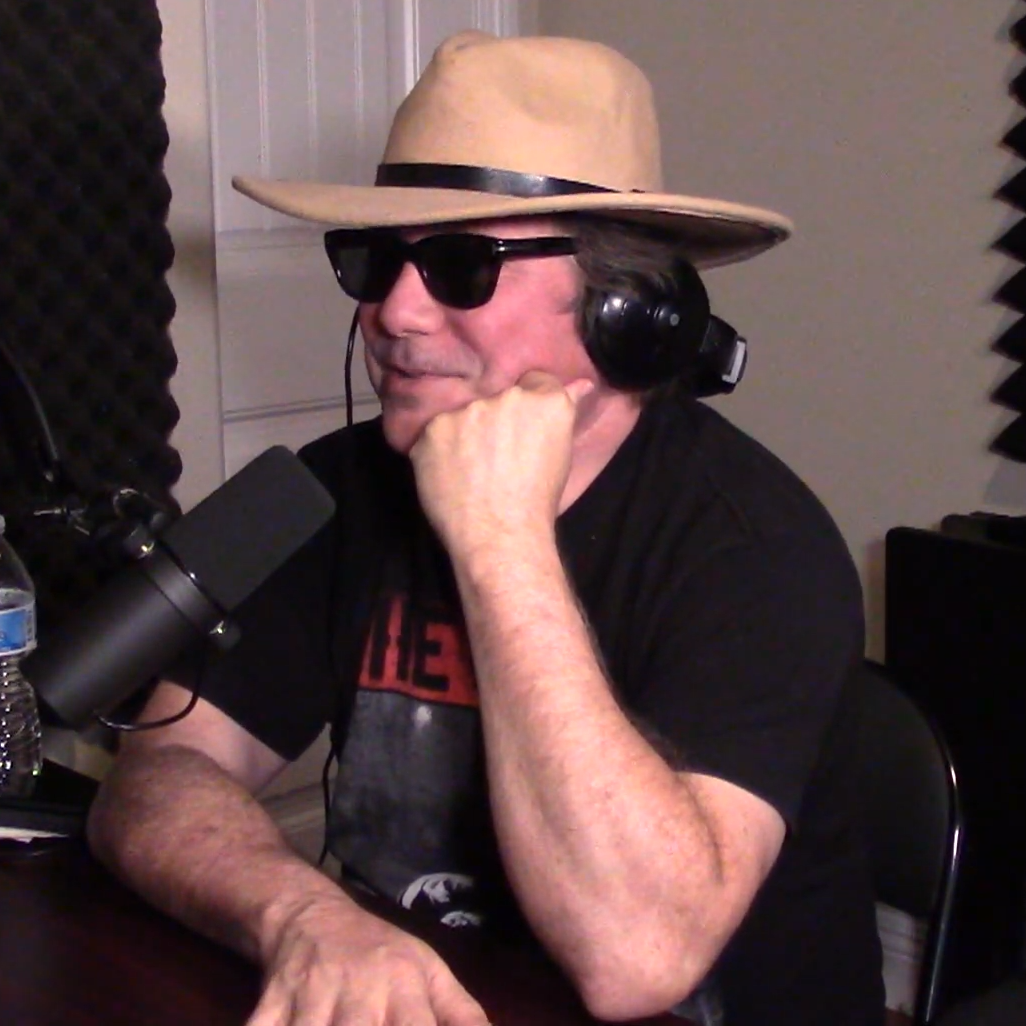
- Muscat in 2021

Background information
- Born: April 23, 1967 (age 59); Hollywood, California, U.S.
- Genres: Hard rock, glam metal, heavy metal
- Occupation: Musician
- Instruments: Guitar, sitar, percussion, talkbox, vocals
- Years active: 1985–present

Brent Muscat (born April 23, 1967) is an American musician best known as the guitarist of glam metal band Faster Pussycat.

== Faster Pussycat, etc. ==
Faster Pussycat was formed in the 1980s Hollywood glam metal boom. The original line up consisted of Brent, along with Taime Downe and Greg Steele. The band's most successful album Wake Me When It's Over earned Gold status from the RIAA.

The name of the band is derived from the Russ Meyer film Faster, Pussycat! Kill! Kill!. Muscat left the band in 1993.

On April 21, 2007, Muscat circulated via MySpace an open invitation to Taime Downe and Greg Steele to reunite the classic Faster Pussycat lineup with him (Downe had been touring in a new incarnation of the group, featuring only himself from the original lineup).

Muscat's version of Faster Pussycat toured Europe in Spring 2007 with Kurt Frohlich replacing Taime on vocals along with Todd Kerns on guitar.

After a short name dispute with Taime Downe, Muscat dropped his claim and dissolved his incarnation of the band.

=== Deluxe ===
Muscat formed Deluxe back in 1994 with Marc Anthony as vocalist, Tommy T-bone Caradonna (ex-White Lion, Alice Cooper, Lita Ford) on bass and Gary Kaluza (ex-Glory Chain) on guitar.

== Sin City Sinners ==
Muscat currently lives in Las Vegas and co-owns the band Sin City Sinners with Todd Kerns (Age of Electric, Static in Stereo, Slash featuring Myles Kennedy and the Conspirators, Kulick). The band is rounded out with Rob Cournoyer (ex-Raging Slab), and Michael "Doc" Ellis (RaTT). (With guest appearance from musician/actor Zachary Throne.) Sin City Sinners has been called the hardest working band in Las Vegas.

Sin City Sinners won "Best of Vegas" two years in a row (2009 and 2010) in the Las Vegas Review Journal reader's poll, and their music video 'Going to Vegas' received the 32nd annual Telly award. Brent and the Sin City Sinners as well as being the house band, won the Publisher's Pick award at the 2010 VRMA Awards.

== ALLEY CATS LV, The Saints of Las Vegas, Original Sin LV, etc. ==
Muscat is one of the characters in the book Sex Tips from Rock Stars by Paul Miles, published by Omnibus Press in July 2010.

=== Alley Cats IV ===
Muscat, executive producer Shion Francois, and Japanese guitarist Takashi O'Hashi (Cats in Boots, SEIKIMAII II, The Outsiders) formed ALLEY CATS LV from 2016. Also the member of this band are Zachary Throne on vocal and bass and drummer Stephen Mills.

In early 2017, they released their first self titled Ep, which was followed up by a tour in Japan. After the tour the band returned to the studio to record its second EP with the single Speed Racing Superstar.

In December 2017, Brent took a "hiatus" from Alley Cats.

=== The Saints of Las Vegas ===
Brent also formed the band Saints of Las Vegas, with Anthony Serrano as the lead singer. On February 7, 2018, the Saints released the single "TOMEKA". They followed that up on March 15, 2018, with the single and lyric music video for "Panic Room".

=== Original Sin LV ===
In 2017, Brent joined Todd Kerns along with the most well known line up of the Sin City Sinners in a limited number of shows. They followed up this limited engagement with an August 31, 2018, gig at the world-famous Count's Vamp'd RockBar & Grill.

=== Radio show ===
Muscat hosted his own radio show "Mondays with Muscat" on lvrockradio that featured local music and musicians.

He also co-hosted "Sinful Sundays" with Dirk Vermin on radiovegas.rocks

== Discography ==
Faster Pussycat

- Faster Pussycat (1987)
- Wake Me When It's Over (1989)
- Live and Rare (1990)
- Whipped! (1992)

Phil Lewis

- More Purple Than Black (1999)

Liberators

- Access Denied (2000)

Bubble

- How Bout This (2000)
- Various Artists – 11th Street Tales: A Tribute to Hanoi Rocks (2000)

L.A. Guns

- Rips the Covers Off (2004)

Underground Rebels

- Insult to Injury (2007)

Sin City Sinners

- Exile on Fremont Street (2010)
- Broken Record (2010)
- A Sinners Christmas (2011)

ALLEY CATS LV

- ALLEY CATS LV (2016)
- Speed Racing Superstar (2017)

The Saints of Las Vegas

- Tomeka, Single (Jan. 2018)
- Panic Room, Single (Feb. 2018)
- Rock n Roll Groupie, Single (March. 2018)
