= Faster Pussycat =

American hard rock band

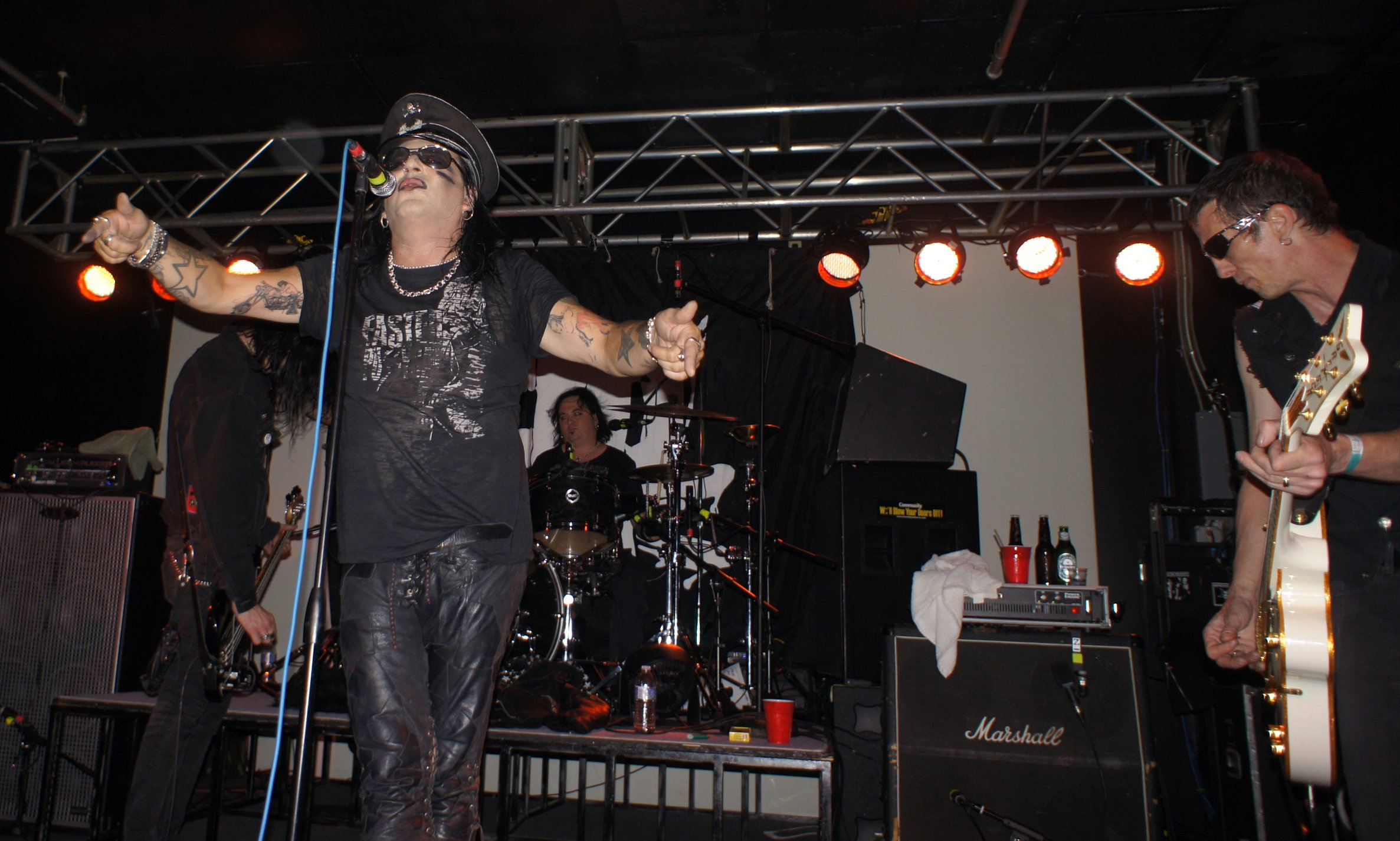
- Faster Pussycat in 2008

Background information
- Origin: Los Angeles, California, U.S.
- Genres: Hard rock; glam metal; glam punk; blues rock; industrial rock (later)
- Years active: 1985–1993; 2001–present
- Label: Elektra
- Members: Taime Downe; Danny Nordahl; Chad Stewart; Chris Borell; Kieran Robertson
- Past members: Brent Muscat; Greg Steele; Mark Michals; Walt Adams; Kelly Nickels; Eric Stacy; Brett Bradshaw; Aaron Abellira; Eric Griffin; Michael Thomas; Ace Von Johnson; Xristian Simon; Ronnie Simmons; Sam Bam Koltun

Faster Pussycat is an American hard rock/glam metal band from Los Angeles, formed in 1985 by vocalist Taime Downe, guitarists Greg Steele and Brent Muscat and bassist Kelly Nickels. The group has since gone through numerous lineup changes leaving Downe as the only constant member. They broke up in 1993, but reformed in 2001. Faster Pussycat has released four studio albums to date: Faster Pussycat (1987), Wake Me When It's Over (1989), Whipped! (1992) and The Power and the Glory Hole (2006). They were a successful hard rock band during the late 1980s and early 1990s, having sold over two million records worldwide.

In 2020, Jeff Mezydlo of Yardbarker included them in his list of "the 20 greatest hair metal bands of all time".

== History ==
=== Early years (1985–1987) ===
Faster Pussycat was formed in Hollywood by Taime Downe during the glam metal and glam punk boom of the 1980s. The earliest incarnation of the band featured Downe and Greg Steele along with Brent Muscat. The name of the band is derived from the Russ Meyer film Faster, Pussycat! Kill! Kill!.

After multiple early personnel changes, Faster Pussycat consisted of Downe (vocals), Steele (guitar), Muscat (guitar), Kelly Nickels (bass) and Mark Michals (drums).

Just before the band recorded their debut album, Nickels got into a motorcycle accident and broke his leg in seven places. He was replaced by Eric Stacy from Champagne Darling Cool. Shortly thereafter, Nickels joined L.A. Guns.

=== Rise to fame and breakup (1987–1993) ===
In the feeding frenzy of the mid-1980s as labels signed other bands affiliated with the Sunset Strip (like Guns N' Roses and Poison), Faster Pussycat signed a record contract with Elektra Records, which released their debut album Faster Pussycat in 1987. The band established a following among heavy metal, glam rock and sleaze rock fans, mainly through two promotional videos from the first album for the songs "Bathroom Wall" and "Don't Change That Song". In November 1987, the band appeared on the cover of Screamer Magazine's debut issue. In the United States the band toured with Alice Cooper, David Lee Roth and Motörhead in support of the album.

Also in 1987, Faster Pussycat appeared in the rockumentary film The Decline of Western Civilization part 2 – The Metal Years. The band was interviewed and performed live versions of "Cathouse" and "Bathroom Wall".

Two years later, Faster Pussycat recorded their most successful album, Wake Me When It's Over. The album earned gold status from the RIAA. Sales were mainly driven by the hit single "House of Pain". Music videos were produced for "House of Pain" and "Poison Ivy". While the band was touring for the album in 1990, drummer Mark Michals was arrested in Omaha, Nebraska and fired from the band after signing for a package of heroin addressed to himself. Frankie Banali of Quiet Riot filled in as drummer for the remainder of the tour, after which Brett Bradshaw became the long-term drummer. Tours with Kiss and Mötley Crüe followed.

In 1990, the band recorded a cover of Carly Simon's "You're So Vain" for a compilation called Rubáiyát: Elektra's 40th Anniversary and filmed a video. The song was later included on the 1992 Belted, Buckled And Booted EP.

In 1992, the band released their third album, Whipped!, which peaked at number 90 on the chart.

In 1993, Faster Pussycat parted ways with Stacy and hired Aaron Abellira to replace him. They embarked on a warmup tour, an American tour and then some shows in Japan. Most of the shows were sold out. They also played one last sold-out show in Hollywood at the Hollywood Palace.

A few weeks after returning to the U.S., Faster Pussycat broke up, its members going their separate ways.

Downe was involved with industrial musical act Pigface, before forming his own industrial rock act with Kyle Kyle of Bang Tango called the Newlydeads.

=== Reunion and change of musical style (2001–2005) ===
In 2001, Faster Pussycat reformed with original members Downe (vocals), Muscat (guitar) and Steele (guitar), alongside Downe's former Newlydeads bandmates Xristian Simon (guitar), Danny Nordahl (bass) and Chad Stewart (drums). Nordahl had also played in the Throbs, and Nordahl and Chad Stewart also both play in Motochrist.

A remix compilation, Between the Valley of the Ultra Pussy, was released the same year, featuring industrial-rock remixes of the band's classic tracks, along with a bonus cover of Kiss's "I Was Made For Loving You". However, this divided fans, as many of the older fanbase who enjoyed standard hard rock were not familiar with industrial rock.

Steele left the band halfway through the 2001 headlining reunion tour. Tracii Guns filled in as guitarist for the rest of the tour, after which Faster Pussycat continued as a five-piece. Eric Griffin from Murderdolls, Synical and (later) Wednesday 13 filled in as guitarist for the American tour, as Muscat's scheduling conflicts prevented him from participating. Muscat returned briefly, until oral cancer sidelined him in late summer of 2005, and he was temporarily replaced by Michael Thomas, an arrangement that would become permanent when Muscat chose not to return to the lineup.

=== Name dispute and Brent Muscat's Faster Pussycat lineup (2006–2007) ===
In December 2006, three former original Faster Pussycat members, Brent Muscat, Eric Stacy and Brett Bradshaw, along with Underground Rebels vocalist Kurt Frohlich and Sin City Sinners guitarist Todd Kerns, began performing under the name Faster Pussycat, creating two versions of the band, both claiming to be the original. Muscat claimed that this was to allow fans to hear Faster Pussycat tracks played the way they were originally recorded, as opposed to the industrial-rock version of the band that he said Downe continued to front. Muscat also made a legal claim to the name Faster Pussycat.

Muscat's Faster Pussycat lineup agreed to play the AVN Awards after-party at the Dive Bar in Las Vegas, Nevada. According to a press release, the band—which did not include Downe—would perform "all classic tracks, no remixes, no B.S."

Downe posted a bulletin on Myspace saying Faster Pussycat was not playing in Las Vegas and that Muscat's version was a "tribute band." Muscat responded that he donated all his earnings from the gig, and planned to donate a portion of any future earnings, to cancer research. In various interviews, Downe disputed Muscat's version of events and indicated that the issue was being dealt with via the courts.

In February 2007, Brent issued this statement on his Myspace blog:

In 2000 Taime made an awful remix cd. It was not until Greg Steele and I threatened him with legal action that we were paid and invited to join our own band. In 2005 I was diagnosed with oral cancer. The band which I had been part of for 20 years all of a sudden replaced me and lied about my condition. I was very hurt that Taime never bothered to call me once. As a result of Taime's drunken and erratic performances, the price for Faster Pussycat live performances plummeted and fans have voiced their displeasure. I decided I would attempt to reunite the band to commemorate our 20th anniversary. I invited both Greg and Taime, (which is more than he did for me) but neither responded.

In a March 2007 interview with an Italian publication, Muscat stated:

I love Taime but I believe he is caught up in a dark, fake and lonely place, where the people around him kiss his ass and then talk shit behind his back.. They use him for his drugs and ride his coat tails... Hollywood has been dead for a few years now... I'm so glad I got away from there and moved to Las Vegas. What is most sad about this, is the fact that I'm one of Taime's only real friends and he is too messed up to see it.

On April 21, 2007, Muscat circulated via Myspace an open invitation to Downe and Steele to reunite, along with Stacy and Bradshaw. There was no response from Downe. Brent's version of Faster Pussycat toured Europe in Spring 2007 with Frohlich replacing Downe on vocals along with Kerns on guitar.

In July 2007, Muscat decided to drop the battle to use the name Faster Pussycat, and has since started a band called Sin City Sinners. Brent has stated in an interview that "Faster Pussycat is dead."

Downe continued with the name Faster Pussycat, performing at Rocklahoma in July 2007. During the band's set, Downe went on a tirade, referencing Muscat's cancer and stating his wish that Muscat would die, which received a poor reception from both the crowd and journalists. He then cut the set short and left the stage without playing several of the band's biggest hits.

=== Recent times (2008–present) ===
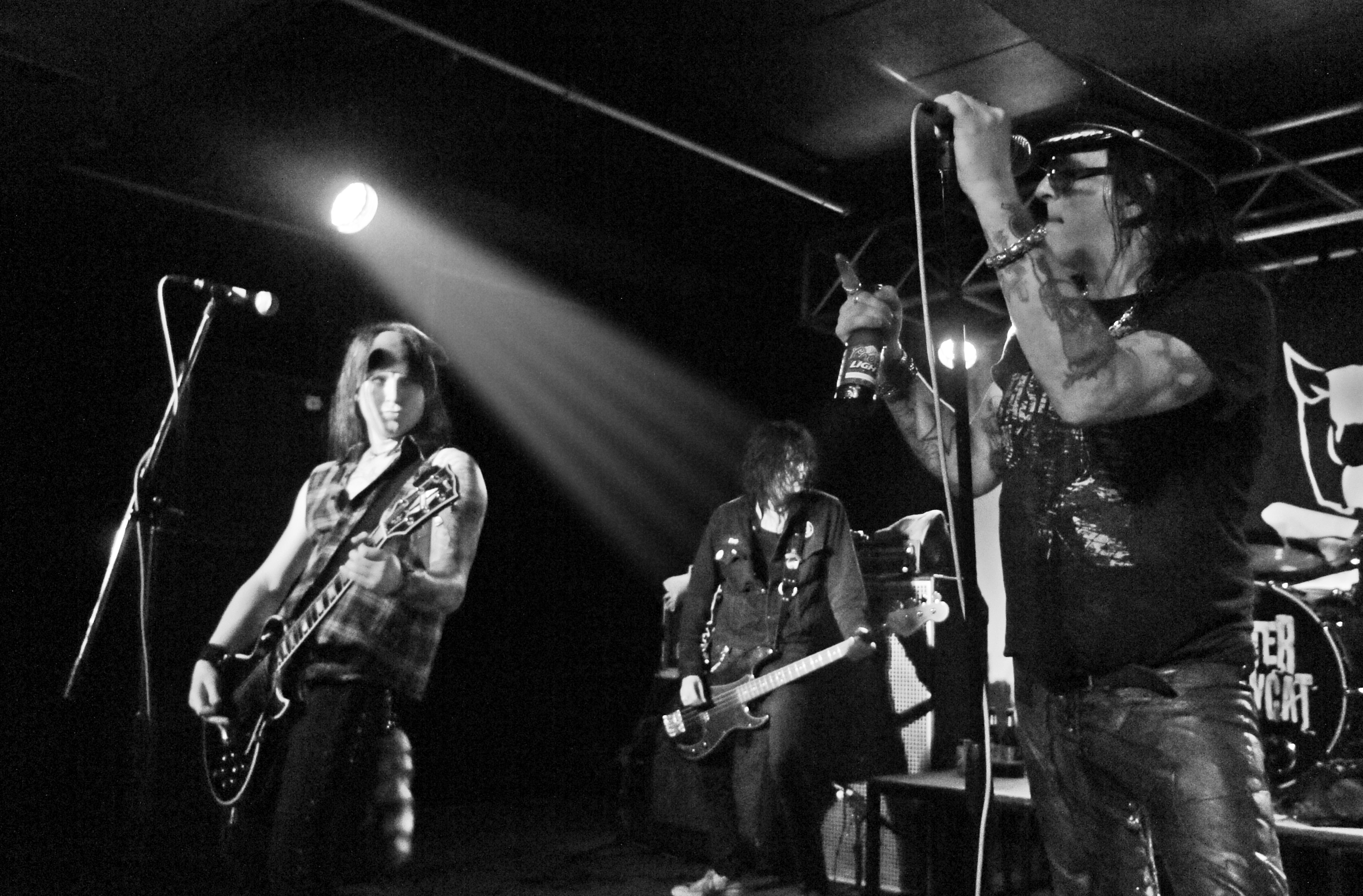
Faster Pussycat in 2008

Faster Pussycat toured the U.S. in the summer of 2008 with Tracii Guns' version of LA Guns.

In the late spring of 2010, Ace Von Johnson replaced Michael Thomas, who was devoting his full-time work to Adler's Appetite.

In late 2013, Faster Pussycat's current lineup went on tour, performing mainly in clubs, bars and university venues. While the band's past problems had shrunk their audiences, the 2013 shows received positive reviews.

During an August 15, 2015, performance at the Cathouse, Brent Muscat, Eric Stacy, and Greg Steele from the classic lineup joined Downe and his then-current incarnation of the band on stage to perform "Bathroom Wall" and "Babylon."

In September 2020, Faster Pussycat posted a picture of themselves in the studio on Facebook, working on what appeared to be new material. In 2022, the band released the single "Like a Ghost" with a B-side cover of Johnny Thunders' "Pirate Love".

Former drummer Brett Bradshaw died unexpectedly on March 26, 2021, at age 50.

== Band members ==
Current members

- Taime Downe – lead vocals, guitar, programming, harmonica, percussion (1985–1993, 2001–present)
- Danny Nordahl – bass, backing vocals (2001–present)
- Chad Stewart – drums, percussion, backing vocals (2001–present)
- Chris Borell – guitar (2026–present)
- Kieran Robertson – guitar (2023–present)

Former members

- Greg Steele – guitar, acoustic guitar mandolin, keyboards, piano, backing vocals (1985–1993, 2001, 2015)
- Brent Muscat – guitar, acoustic guitar, sitar, percussion, talkbox, backing vocals (1985–1993, 2001–2005, 2015)
- Mark Michals – drums, percussion, backing vocals (1985–1990)
- Walt "Walta" Adams – bass (1985–1986)
- Kelly Nickels – bass, backing vocals (1986–1987)
- Eric Stacy – bass, fretless bass, backing vocals (1987–1993, 2015)
- Brett Bradshaw – drums, percussion, backing vocals (1990–1993; died 2021)
- Aaron Abellira – bass (1993)
- Michael Thomas – guitar, backing vocals (2005–2010)
- Ace Von Johnson – guitar, backing vocals (2010–2019, touring 2026)
- Dish – drums, percussion (2005)
- Xristian Simon – guitar (2001–2021)
- Ronnie Simmons – guitar (2021–2023)
- Mihailo Lukic – guitar (2023)
- Sam Bam Koltun – guitar, mandolin, talkbox, backing vocals (2019–2026)

Touring members

- Frankie Banali – drums, percussion (1990; died 2020)
- Tracii Guns – guitar, backing vocals (2001–2002)
- Eric Griffin – guitar (2005)
- Johnny Martin – bass, backing vocals (2024)

== Discography ==
=== Studio albums ===
Year	Album	US	JP	UK	Certification	Label
1987	Faster Pussycat	97	—	—		Elektra
1989	Wake Me When It's Over	48	—	35	US: Gold	Elektra
1992	Whipped!	90	43	58		Elektra
2006	The Power and the Glory Hole	—	—	—		Full Effect

=== Live albums ===
- Front Row for the Donkey Show (2009)

=== EPs ===
- Live and Rare (1990)
- Belted, Buckled and Booted (1992) // 25,000+ US

=== Remix albums ===
- Between the Valley of the Ultra Pussy (2001)

=== Compilations ===
- Greatest Hits: Faster Pussycat (2003)

=== Singles ===
Year	Single	Chart positions		Album
Year	Single	US Hot 100	US Main Rock	Album
1987	"Babylon"	—	—	Faster Pussycat
1987	"Don't Change That Song"	—	—	Faster Pussycat
1987	"Bathroom Wall"	—	—	Faster Pussycat
1989	"Poison Ivy"	—	—	Wake Me When It's Over
1989	"House of Pain"	28	23	Wake Me When It's Over
1990	"Where There's A Whip There's A Way"	—	—	Wake Me When It's Over
1990	"You're So Vain"	—	—	Rubáiyát: Elektra's 40th Anniversary
1992	"Nonstop to Nowhere"	—	35	Whipped!
1992	"The Body Thief"	—	—	Whipped!
2006	"Number 1 with a Bullet"	—	—	The Power and the Glory Hole
2009	"Bathroom Wall" (Live)	—	—	Front Row For The Donkey Show
2021	"NOLA"	—	—	Non-album single
