= Taime Downe =

American rock musician

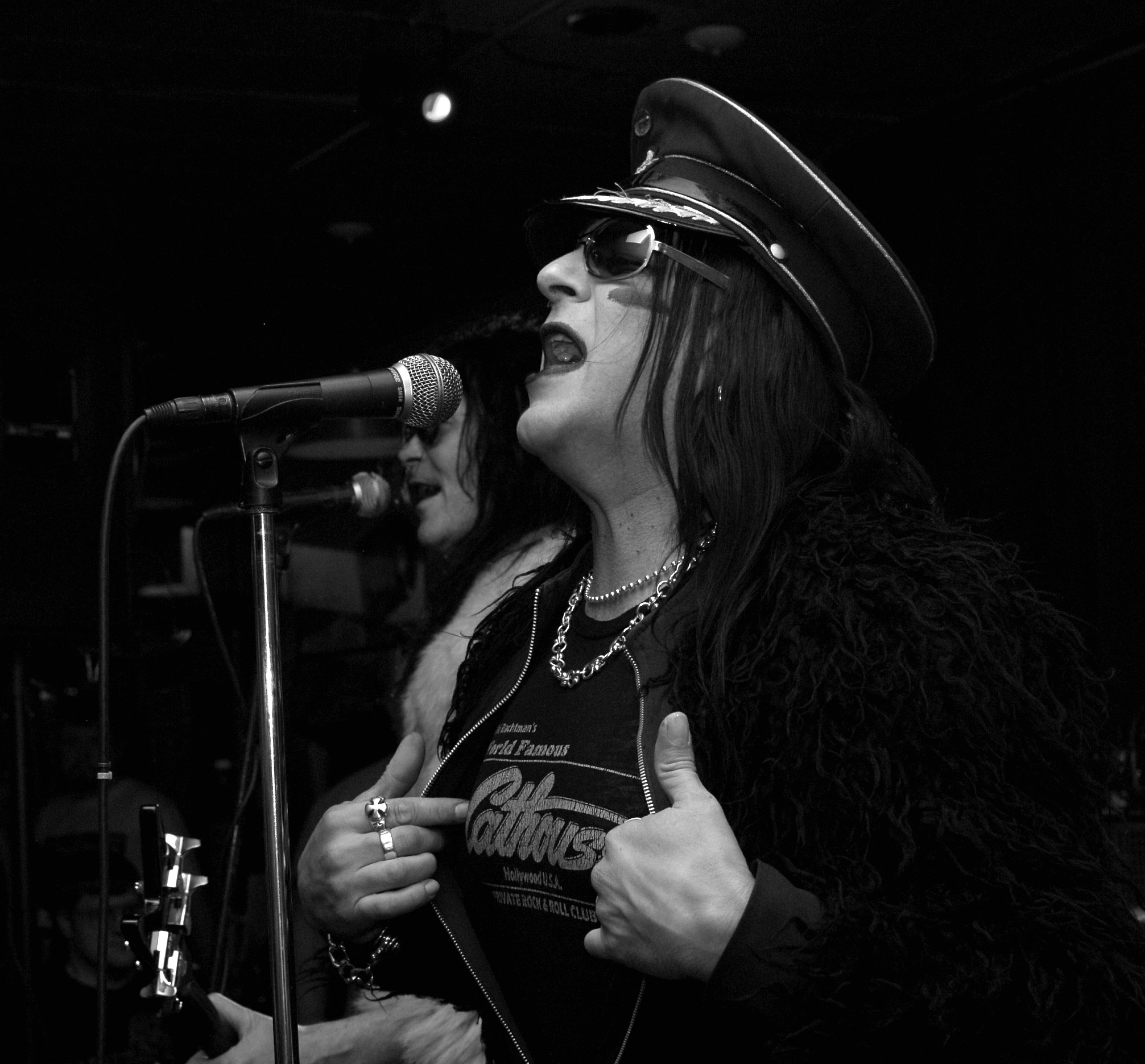
- Downe in 2010

Background information
- Also known as: Vaunn Hammer
- Born: Gustave Molvik; September 29, 1964 (age 62)
- Genres: Hard rock, glam metal, industrial rock
- Occupations: Singer, songwriter
- Years active: 1985–present
- Member of: Faster Pussycat
- Formerly of: The Newlydeads

Taime Downe (/ˈteɪmiː ˈdaʊn/; born Gustave Molvik on September 29, 1964) is an American musician best known as the lead singer of the 1980s hard rock/glam metal band Faster Pussycat, on which he is the only constant member of the band.

== Career ==
In high school, Downe formed a band named The Bondage Boys, and going under the stage name Vaun Hammer, he released a song with this band titled "The Loser" on Northwest Metalfest, a compilation featuring 10 Seattle-area bands. Sometime after this, he left Seattle for San Diego and then moved on to Los Angeles.

Downe worked for Retail Slut in Hollywood and ran the stage lights at the Troubadour. Magnus Walker of Serious Clothing accidentally got his start when, walking into Retail Slut, Downe asked where he had got his pants. Although Walker had bought them in Hollywood for less than $10, he replied England, and Downe asked him to source 8 pairs at a price of $25 to sell in the store.

In 1985, he formed the band Faster Pussycat. The five-member band released their debut album in 1987.

Faster Pussycat were signed to Elektra Records and sold over 500,000 copies of 1989's Wake Me When It's Over. They toured with Y&T, Ace Frehley, Alice Cooper, Mötley Crüe, Kiss, David Lee Roth, and others. Their next album Whipped!, released in 1992, was less popular. The band broke up that year, with Downe's moving to Chicago to work with Pigface. Downe also sang backing vocals on Skid Row's 1992 cover of the Ramones' "Psycho Therapy".

Downe returned to Los Angeles shortly after and put together the industrial rock band The Newlydeads for which he wrote and produced. Around 1998, he opened his own club, named The Pretty Ugly Club, with co-owner JD Terziu, and the club achieved the same level of success as The Cathouse, the club Downe had run with Riki Rachtman. Taime has also been the promoter of other clubs in Los Angeles, such as Thunder Pussy and Pretty Pussy. He also was the DJ at Metal Skool with Josh Richman as the MC.

The Newlydeads released a remix CD titled Re-Bound, and in 2001, released Dead End. The same year, Downe reunited for a tour with original Faster Pussycat members Brent Muscat and Greg Steele joining him. The re-formed band opened for Poison in 2002.

In 2006, he released Dreams from a Dirt Nap, a Newlydeads best-of album, in May, and the Faster Pussycat album The Power and the Glory Hole in July.

== Personal life ==
Downe's fiancée Kimberly Burch died in March 2025 after falling from a cruise ship.
