= Chris Seefried discography =

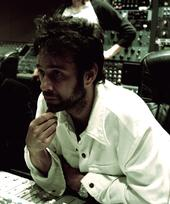
- Seefried photographed by Henry Diltz in Los Angeles, 2007
- Studio albums: 43
- Extended plays: 7
- Soundtrack albums: 7
- Compilation albums: 8
- Singles: 20
- B-sides: 2
- Music videos: 13
- Collaborations: 34

This is the discography of the artist and producer Chris Seefried.

Since first becoming active in 1989, Seefried has released six studio albums and one soundtrack as an artist. He has two with Gods Child, two with Joe 90, one with Low Stars and one as a solo artist. There are many more as a producer and collaborator.

== Discography – artist ==
Year	Album/single/soundtrack	Comment
1989	Temptation Eyes single U.K.	with Brother Brother
1990	All American single U.K.	with Brother Brother
1994	Everybody	with Gods Child
1994	Everybody's 1 single U.S.	with Gods Child
1994	Stone Horses single U.S.	with Gods Child
1996	Aluminum	with Gods Child
1996	Female Elvis single U.S.	with Gods Child
1996	This Is The Real World? single U.S.	with Gods Child
1999	Dream This	with Joe 90
1999	Drive single U.S.	with Joe 90
1999	Truth single U.S.	with Joe 90
2000	A Raccoons Lunch	with Joe 90
2000	And When I Die soundtrack	with Joe 90
2007	Calling All Friends single and bonus track	with Low Stars
2007	Low Stars	with Low Stars
2008	Denim Blue	solo album
2012	A Nickel Cost a Dime single	solo single
2012	Roadie	Soundtrack

== Selected discography ==
Year	Artist	Title	Role
1999	Counting Crows	This Desert Life	Musician
2005	Six Feet Under	Soundtrack	Producer, composer, musician
2008	Jay Nash	The Things You Think You Need	Producer, composer, musician
2009	Fitz and the Tantrums	Songs for a Breakup, Vol. 1	Producer, composer, musician
2010	Justine Bennett	Heavy Feeling	Producer, composer, musician
2010	Fitz and the Tantrums	Pickin' Up the Pieces	Producer, composer, musician
2011	Jay Nash	Diamonds and Blood	Producer, composer, musician
2011	Fitz and the Tantrums	Santa Stole My Lady	Producer, composer, musician
2011	Gemma Hayes	Let It Break	Composer
2011	Dia Frampton	Red	Composer, musician
2011	Friends With Benefits	Original soundtrack	Producer, composer, musician
2012	Haley Reinhart	Listen Up!	Producer, composer, musician, engineer
2012	Anderson East	Flowers of the Broken Hearted	Producer, composer, musician, engineer
2012	Counting Crows	The Load Out	Producer
2012	Lana Del Rey	Boarding School	Producer, composer, musician, mixer
2012	Butter	Soundtrack	Producer, composer, musician
2013	Fitz and the Tantrums	More Than Just a Dream	Composer
2013	Joseph Arthur	The Ballad of Boogie Christ	Producer, musician, engineer
2014	Larkin Poe	Kin	Producer, composer, musician, mixer
2015	The Royal Concept	Smile	Composer
2015	Andra Day	Cheers to the Fall	Producer, composer, musician, engineer
2016	Ellise	Break Down	Producer, mixer
2016	Larkin Poe	Reskinned	Producer, composer, musician, mixer
2017	Pokey LaFarge	Manic Revelations	Composer
2017	Nicole Atkins	Goodnight Rhonda Lee	Composer
2017	The Kooks	The Best of... So Far	Composer, musician
2017	Trombone Shorty	Parking Lot Symphony	Producer, arranger, composer, musician
2018	The Kooks	Let's Go Sunshine	Producer, arranger, composer, musician
2018	The Devil Makes Three	Chains Are Broken	Composer
2019	The Royal Concept	The Man Without Qualities	Producer, arranger, composer
2019	Love, Antosha	Original soundtrack	Producer, arranger
2019	Joseph Arthur	Come Back World	Producer, musician

=== Singles ===
Year	Single	Chart	Position
1990	"Temptation Eyes"	UK Singles Chart	48
1990	"All American"	UK Singles Chart	50
1994	"Everybody's 1"	Billboard Mainstream Rock Tracks	18
1994	"Everybody's 1"	Billboard Modern Rock Tracks	25
1994	"Stone Horses"	Billboard Modern Rock Tracks	–
1996	"Female Elvis"	Billboard Modern Rock Tracks	–
1996	"This the Real World?"	Billboard Modern Rock Tracks	–
1999	"Drive"	Billboard AAA Tracks	–
2007	"Calling All Friends"	Billboard AAA Tracks	–
2011	"Money Grabber"	US Billboard Top Heatseekers	2
2011	"Money Grabber"	Billboard Modern Rock Tracks	33
2011	"Money Grabber"	Billboard Hot AC	34
2011	"Dont Gotta Work it Out"	Billboard AC	34
2016	"Gold"	Billboard R&B	13
2016	"City of Angels"	Billboard AC	19
2017	"Be Who You Are"	Billboard Modern Rock Tracks	–
2017	"Here Come the Girls"	Billboard AAA Tracks	–

=== Grammy Awards ===
Year	Nominee / work	Award	Result
2016
2016	Cheers to the Fall	Best R&B Album	Nominated

== Videography ==
- "Everybody's 1" (1994)
- "Stone Horses" (1994)
- "Slide" (1995)
- "Stop" (1999)
- "Drive" (1999)
- "Bowl of Cherries" – includes "Trax in the Rain", "More or Less", "Sweet Love", and "Denim Blue" (2005)
- "Calling All Friends" (2007)
- "Child" (2007)
- "Low Stars epk" (2007)
- "Just Around the Corner" (2007)
- "Interview with Chris Hillman" (2008)
- "More or Less" (2008)
- "Low Stars and Friends" (2009)
