= Lantz L'Amour =

American musician

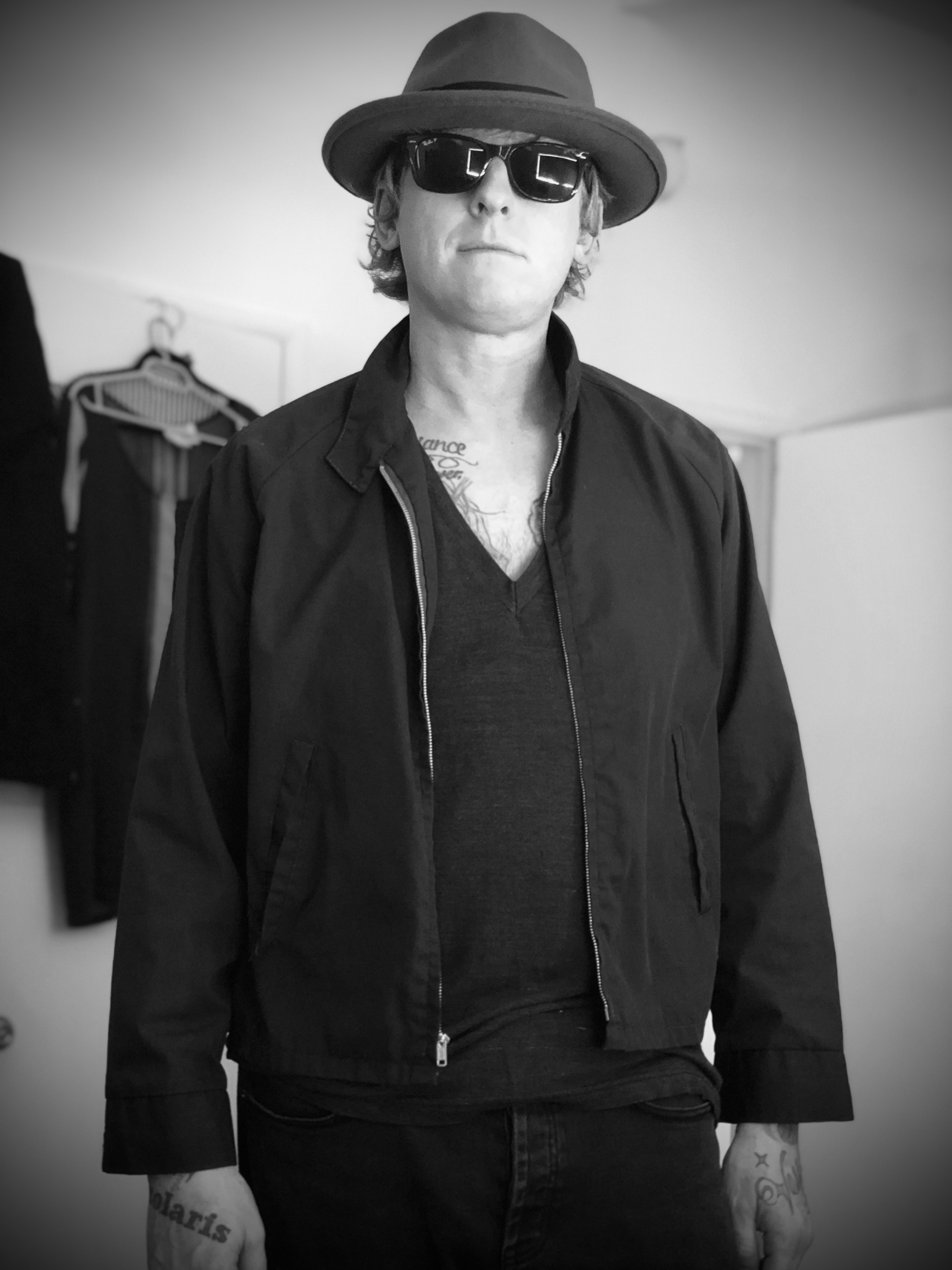
- Lantz L'Amour in Los Angeles, California, 2020

Background information
- Born: September 4, 1978 (age 47); Iowa City, Iowa, United States
- Origin: Los Angeles, California, United States
- Genres: Rock, punk rock
- Years active: 1992–present

Lantz L'Amour (a.k.a. Tyson Cornell, born Robert Tyson Cornell, September 4, 1978, Iowa City, Iowa, United States) is an American musician best known as the singer and guitarist of the Los Angeles "Miami Vice–rock" duo The Violent Professionals, in addition to his work as a solo recording artist and musician for vinyl audiobooks.

== History ==
=== The Violent Professionals (2018–present) ===
In early 2018, Lantz L'Amour and former Smack and Crenshaw Mafia Motherfuckers collaborator, "Rick" James Zimlin, formed the "Miami Vice–rock" duo, The Violent Professionals, after nearly five years of writing songs and occasional retreat experimentations with The Singing Ringing Tree in Burnley, Lancashire, England. "It was really about making sure the material had vision, as well as a connection with ancient ancestors," L'Amour commented in an interview with The Yorkshire Guardian, "as opposed to just performing songs that were in our extensive joint catalogs not yet used in other projects. We knew this material was special. It was the same vibe and energy that we'd had our entire time in music, yet there was a spiritual element to it that we'd both always wanted to fully express but hadn't felt the same enthusiasm with our previous bandmates—well, that, and we'd acquired more synthesizers."

On September 3, 2018, The Violent Professionals played a secret show (as the Bästard Säints) at The Viper Room in West Hollywood, California with American hard rock band Junkyard. The set included fan-favorites from their prequel "rock" period, including "Keep the Situation Low," "Lie Back and Think of England," "(Caught In His) Blacklite Eyes," "When You Die the Pain Is Over," and "I'll Never Get Over Him"—as well as back-catalog CMMF-era crowd pleasers "Time To Get Fucked," "Black on Black," Not Guilty," and "Afterglow (Teenage Kicks)."

=== Music for vinyl audiobooks (2012–present) ===
In 2015, Lantz L'Amour (occasionally credited as Tyson Cornell) began contributing music to vinyl audiobooks, including Expedition by Chuck Palahniuk (Fight Club), featuring Minimoog and Mellotron by Rob Campanella (The Brian Jonestown Massacre/The Quarter After); and New Jersey Me by Rich Ferguson, featuring Josh Haden (Spain) and Butch Norton (Eels, Lucinda Williams).

=== The Black Watch (2014–2017) ===
After filling in on guitar with The Black Watch for SXSW shows in early 2015, L'Amour (credited as Tyson Cornell) continued to play select regional shows with the band and record on three full-length releases Highs and Lows (2015), The Gospel According to John (2016), and Witches! (2017)—produced by Rob Campanella (The Brian Jonestown Massacre/The Quarter After) and Scott Campbell. L'Amour ultimately left the group after supposed disagreements with Black Watch singer, John Andrew Fredrick, about L'Amour's insistence on being credited by his stage name rather than his legal name (Tyson Cornell), as well as the long-running difference of opinion between L'Amour and John Andrew Fredrick over whether to refer to Black Watch songs as "songs" or "tunes." (John Andrew Fredrick, apparently, heavily detested the latter.)

=== Ghost of the Record (2004–present) ===
After recording and mixing the 2003 Crenshaw Mafia Motherfuckers album in Los Angeles, the band waited patiently for Recipro/Heatseeker to schedule the Japanese release and subsequent Japanese tour dates anchored around two nights at Budokan with Loudness on New Year's Eve and New Years Day (2003/2004). As the Budokan dates repeatedly postponed due to complications with Budokan promoters, L'Amour, Zimlin, and Himawari initially went into Cole Rehearsal Studio in Los Angeles with producer and guitarist Ray Hartman (Liars Inc.) to immediately write and record the sophomore Crenshaw Mafia Motherfuckers release. However, due to disputes and creative differences, the follow-up Crenshaw Mafia Motherfuckers record was scrapped, leaving L'Amour and Hartman to explore new material built around Himawari's drum tracks that were laid down before the CMMF breakup. This new material, financed by Recipro/Heatseeker, was subsequently rejected by the Japanese label, then renamed Ghost of the Record and mixed by Los Angeles producer Noah Shain (while Shain simultaneously recorded and mixed the first Orson full-length release, Bright Idea, which included the UK #1 chart topper "No Tomorrow"). The Ghost of the Record album, Exorcising the Pursuit of Pleasure—featuring an explicit cover image photographed by Robin Perine featuring pornographic model/actress Jelena Jensen and musician Christian Martucci (Dee Dee Ramone, Stone Sour, Black President, Corey Taylor, Black Star Riders)—was subsequently shelved and never released.

=== Generation Beautiful (2008) ===
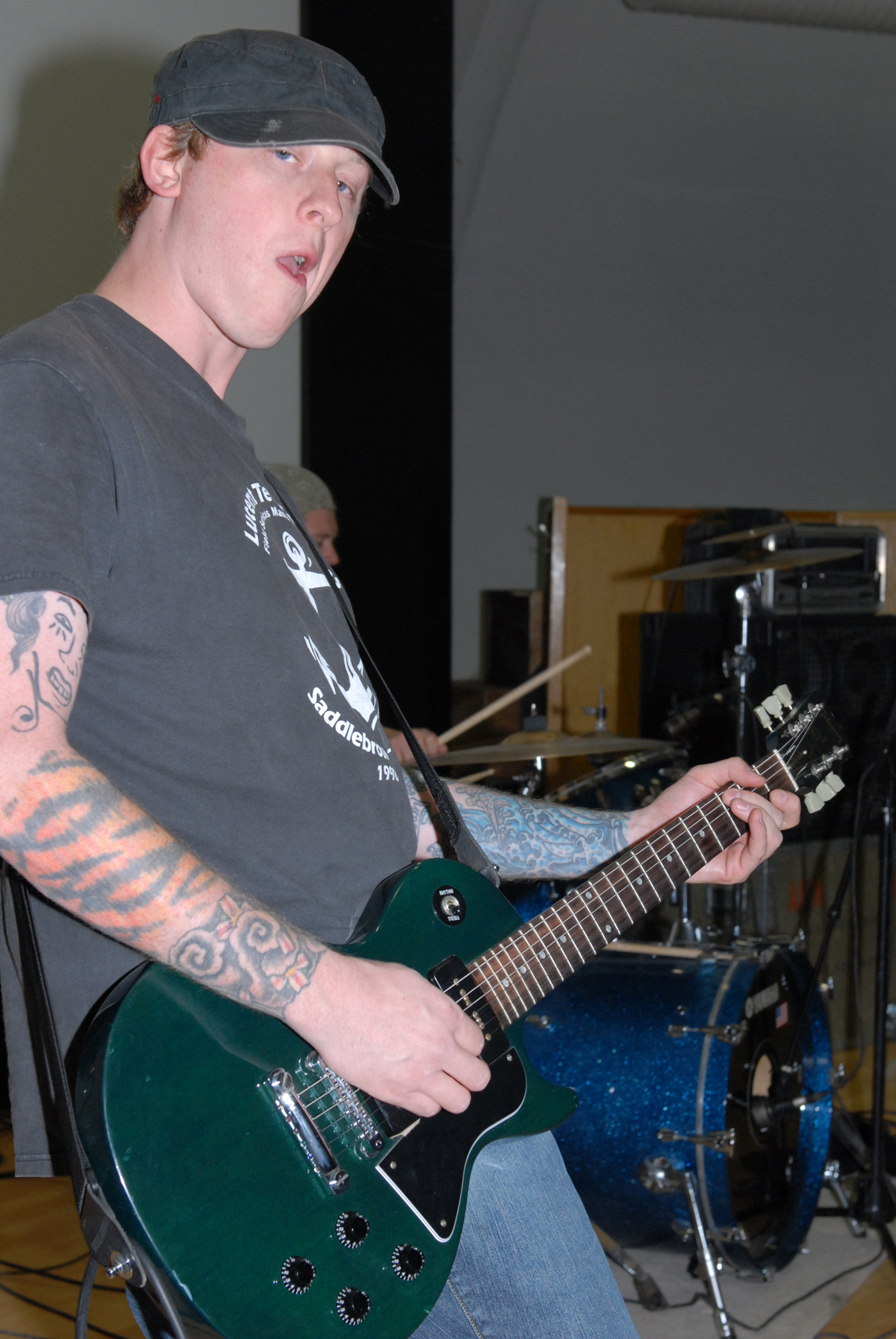
Cornell playing with Shelby Goff's band, Generation Beautiful, at Forward Operating Base Marez during a USO tour, August 14, 2008

In May and August 2008, L'Amour joined ex–Miami Dolphins cheerleader, Shelby Goff, and her band Generation Beautiful, featuring Jamie Zimlin and Dylan Howard on two USO tours through Iraq, Kosovo, Kuwait, Germany, and Italy to perform for Multi-National Coalition soldiers in combat.

=== Crenshaw Mafia Motherfuckers (2003–2004) ===
Crenshaw Mafia Motherfuckers (CMMF) were a Los Angeles–based rock band featuring renowned Japanese drummer C. J. Himawari a.k.a. Clutch (Sex Machineguns), Lantz L'Amour, Jamie Zimlin, Stacey Blades. They released one self-titled album in 2004 on the Japanese label Recipro/Heatseeker. The album was produced by Joseph Holiday (Lady Sinatra/Snakes of Russia).

=== Smack/The Wyndham Stalls (2002–2004) ===
Los Angeles's Smack (often confused with the Finnish band Smack, though not associated) featured ex-Supercool Lantz L'Amour, Stacey Blades, (L.A. Guns, Roxx Gang), Jamie Zimlin, and Patrick Muzingo. (Junkyard, Decry). They recorded one EP, Antidisestablishmentarianism (2003), at Catalo Studios in North Hollywood produced by Brent Muscat (Faster Pussycat). With Smack's demise in 2004, Stacey Blades joined L.A. Guns. Their song "Chemicals" was featured on The Howard Stern Show in 2003, shortly before the band changed their name to The Wyndham Stalls.

=== Supercool (2000–2002) ===
Supercool was a band featuring singer Lantz L'Amour, guitarist Stacey Blades (L.A. Guns, Roxx Gang), bassist Eric Stacy (Faster Pussycat), and drummers Vik Foxx (Enuff Z'Nuff) and Dave Moreno (Puddle of Mudd). The band released one CD EP, Live at the Wilcox Hotel, and played their first show at the El Centro in Los Angeles for the reopening of The Cathouse with Riki Rachtman before touring Japan in early 2002. Their "Five Nights at The Wall, Shinjuku" live VHS bootleg is a sought-after gem among hair- and street-rock collectors.

=== Machinegun (2000–2001) ===
In late 2000, L'Amour played briefly with San Diego punk band Machinegun, founded by Chris Fields of Jon Cougar Concentration Camp, The Queers, and the Dwarves. They released one album, Taste for Blood (2001), produced by Blag Dahlia (Dwarves) on I Used to Fuck People Like You in Prison Records (Germany).

=== The Totallies (1994–1996) ===
The Totallies released one 7-inch EP Drunk Over You (1995) on Braindart Records, recorded at the home of Rob Fraser (Krupted Peasant Farmerz) while on tour; one split 7-inch with The Monos; and featured tracks on both the Punk Strikes Back! (Backspin Records, 1996) compilation album, and on the We're Addicted to Dayquil! (LantzCentrL Records, 1996) compilation.

=== The Krishnaz (1992–1994) ===
The Krishnaz formed in Edina, Minnesota during 1992 and featured singer/guitarist/songwriter Toby Staley, guitarist Bill Morrisette, and Lantz on drums. Toby and Lantz are featured flaunting their matching Screeching Weasel tattoos in the 1994 Screeching Weasel collection Kill the Musicians (Lookout! Records). In 1998, Canadian punk band The McRackins released a cover version The Krishnaz' "Perfect World" on their Oddities & Eggcentricities, Vol. 1 CD (Stiff Pole Records).

== Discography ==
=== CD/LPs ===
Year	Title	Label	Line up	Other information
2003	Crenshaw Mafia Motherfuckers	Recipro/Heatseeker	Lantz L'Amour – Guitar, Vocals Stacey Blades – Guitar Jamie Zimlin – Bass C. J. Himawari – Drums	Crenshaw Mafia Motherfuckers (CD only), 12 songs: "Theme from Motherfucker" (Instrumental), "After Glow" (Teenage Kicks), "Time to Get Fucked," "Thug It Out," "Radio Tokyo," "(Not Looking Back) Black on Black," "Not Guilty: The Truth About Orenthal James," "Aqualung" (Instrumental), "Disconnected," "No Pain," "After Glow #2" *Bonus Track
2004	Ghost of the Record	Recipro/Heatseeker	Lantz L'Amour – Vocals Ray Hartman – Guitar, Bass C. J. Himawari – Drums	Ghost of the Record (unreleased), 10 songs: "Introduction," "Looking Good," "Finest Hour," "A Threat to Everyone's Memory," "Phnom Penh," "Time Delays," "Weight," "Salome," "Ghost of the Record," "The Stage Is a Box of Night"
2013	Of Wishbones and Gunfire	We Voice Sing	Rich Ferguson—Lyrics and Poetry Bo Blount—Music Tyson Cornell—Additional Guitars	We Voice Sing CD, "A Dedication," "Of Wishbones and Gunfire," "I Can't Quit You," "From Within to Without," "Everywhere Is Love," "When Words Meant to Be Spoken Are Bottled up For Too Long," "I Wait For You," "Fast," "When You Call My Name," "Darwin Descending," "Illumination Nation," "Butterfly, Moon, Bed," "We Voice Sing," "No Animals or Insects Were Tortured or Killed in the Making of This Poem."
2015	Expedition	Chuck Palahniuk	Chuck Palahniuk—Narration Lantz L'Amour (as Tyson Cornell)—Instrumentation Rob Campanella—Minimoog and Mellotron	Chuck Palahniuk LP (black vinyl), unabridged vinyl audiobook narration of the short story "Expedition," a Fight Club prequel, as featured in Palahniuk's short story collection, Make Something Up (Doubleday, 2015).
2017	New Jersey Me	Rare Bird Recordings	Rich Ferguson—Narration Lantz L'Amour (as Tyson Cornell)—Guitar Butch Norton—Drums Josh Haden—Bass	Richard Ferguson and the Rainbow Casket Company 2×LP (300 black vinyl), 16 songs: "All Me," "Callie," "Madman," "Interlude I: Back When I Was Almost Sixteen," "Math," "Interlude II: Ever Since I Was a Kid," "Highway Star," "Interlude III: Drifted Off," "Spirit In the Sky," "Interlude IV: The Doll House," "Marlene," "The Dump," "Interlude V: Terry and I Continued Brawling," "Baby," "Terry," "California Me"

=== 7-inch/CD EPs ===
Year	Title	Label	Other information
1994	Drunk Over You	Braindart	The Totallies 7-inch EP, 6 songs: "Wasting Away," "J.I.F.F.Y.," "Drunk Over You," "East of Eden," "Tori Is a Totally Now," "Burly Girl." Vinyl only, limited to 600 (blue vinyl).
1995	Breakup	LantzCentrL	The Totallies 7-inch split EP w/ The Monos, 6 Songs. The Totalies: "Breakup," "I Was Wrong," "Have You Ever Fallen in Love?" The Monos: "What Is Wrong," "Hot Rod High," "Thinking About You." Vinyl only, limited to 500 (black vinyl).
1996	"Mottor Skills"	Columbus	Out for Justice Soundtrack to Raging Fire: The Out for Justice Story, 6 Songs: "Commenticius Operato Qualificato," "Unlisted Track," "Love Tractor," Locked-Down," "Heartbreak Boulevard," "Rock and Roll Evolution." CD only, limited to 500.
1998	International Playboy	LantzCentrL	Lantz L'Amour split w/ The Monos. 5 Songs. L: "International Playboy," "Homesick in My Hometown." M: "Yesteryear," "That's Too Bad," "Mike Bahler." CD only, limited to 200.
2001	Live at the Wilcox Hotel	LantzCentrL	Supercool 6 Songs: "Don't Let Me Go," "Can't Live with Myself," "Looking Over My Shoulder," "Afterglow," "Once Ain't Enough," "Legend in His Own Mind." CD only, limited to 500 (pink/black).
2012	Lover of All That Exists	Rare Bird Recordings	Ghost of the Record w/ Shriners and Christian Martucci 7-inch Picture Disc, 3 songs: Shriners, "Pretty (Watch the Shadow)"; Christian Martucci, "Bad Ghosts"; Ghost of the Record, "Stage Is a Box of Night." Vinyl only, limited to 500 copies as a companion release for the novel Johnny Future by Steve Abee and debut release of the Scott Shriner (Weezer) solo project, Shriners.

=== Compilation albums ===
Year	Title	Label	Other information
1996	We're Addicted To Dayquil!	LantzCentrL	The Totallies, LP compilation, 2 Songs. With Scooby Don't, The Mushuganas, 7 O' Clock Sucker, Nonsense, Haskel, Discount, Hairy Italians, The Curbs, Shotwell Coho, The Crumbs and Slinky. Vinyl only, limited to 1,000 (500 clear/500 2hite.
1996	Punk Strikes Back	Backspin	The Totallies, compilation, 1 Song: Butterqueef. With Rhythm Collision, Moral Crux and more. CD only.
