= Subterranean =

Subterranean(s) or The Subterranean(s) may refer to:

- Subterranea (geography), underground structures, both natural and man-made

== Literature ==
- Subterranean (novel), a 1998 novel by James Rollins
- Subterranean Magazine, an American fantasy, horror and science fiction magazine
- Subterranean Press, an American small press publisher
- The Subterraneans, a 1958 novella by Jack Kerouac

== Media (film and TV) ==
- The Subterraneans (film) 1960 motion picture based on the Kerouac novella
- The Subterranean, a 1967 Romanian film

== Music ==
- Subterranean (EP) (1995), by Swedish band In Flames
- "Subterranean" (2003), a song by band Smack
- "Subterranean" (2014), a song by Foo Fighters on the album Sonic Highways
- Subterranean Records, an American record label
- "Subterraneans" (1977), a song by David Bowie
- "Subterraneans" (1984), a song by rock band Flesh for Lulu
- Subterraneans (band), an English rock band

== See also ==
- Subterranea (disambiguation)
- Underground (disambiguation)
