= Smack (American band) =

Los Angeles pop/rock band

- Origin: Los Angeles, United States
- Genres: Pop, rock
- Years active: 2002–04

Smack is a Los Angeles pop/rock band formed by singer/guitarist Lantz L'Amour, current L.A. Guns guitarist Stacey Blades, former and now current Blessings bassist Jamie Zimlin, and former Junkyard drummer Patrick Muzingo.

== The Fall of "Supercool" ==
By late January 2002, guitarist Stacey Blades and singer Lantz L'Amour were back in Los Angeles from playing five nights at The Wall in Shinjuku, Tokyo, with the L.A. glam band Supercool (also featuring ex-Faster Pussycat bassist Eric Stacy and ex-Enuff Z'nuff/Vince Neil Band drummer Vik Foxx) in support of their recently released six song EP "Live at the Wilcox Hotel." As the Supercool shows were relatively well received by Japanese audiences, the short-lived group showed signs of internal conflict within days of their return and disbanded by the end of February.

== Smack ==
In February 2002, Lantz and Stacey teamed up with Jamie and began writing songs for their new project.t. By early April 2002 they had dubbed themselves "Smack," discreetly recruited ex-Junkyard/Speedbuggy USA drummer Patrick Muzingo, and recorded four songs ("Subterranean", "Disconnected", "Amazed That I'm Alive", and "Simple Plan") in a Van Nuys home studio engineered by New Improved God bassist Skip Whiting.

== Antidisestablishmentarianism ==
After nearly a year of immersion writing and performing, Smack went into the studio with Faster Pussycat guitarist Brent Muscat as producer to record the band's debut three-song EP Antidisestablishmentarianism. Prior to U.S. release, the record's opening track "Chemicals" was played on The Howard Stern Show and favorably critiqued after being sent in anonymously in response to Stern Show staffers complaining that no good bands have come out of L.A. in recent years.

== The Wyndham Stalls ==
Smack later changed their name to The Wyndham Stalls for a brief period in early 2004 before breaking up. The name supposedly refers to an incident that occurred in the first floor restroom of the Wyndham Bel Age Hotel (now The London) in West Hollywood, California.

== Discography ==
- Antidisestablishmentarianism (2003)
