= Loud & Dangerous: Live from Hollywood =

Live album by L.A. Guns
- Released: September 12, 2006
- Recorded: June 28, 2005
- Venue: House of Blues (West Hollywood, California)
- Genre: Hard rock; glam metal
- Length: 58:13
- Label: Shrapnel
- Producer: L.A. Guns

L.A. Guns chronology
Tales from the Strip (2005)	Loud & Dangerous: Live from Hollywood (2006)	Hellraiser's Ball: Caught in the Act (2008)

Loud & Dangerous: Live from Hollywood is the third live album by American hard rock band L.A. Guns. Recorded on June 28, 2005, at the House of Blues in West Hollywood, California, it was self-produced by the band and released on September 12, 2006, by Shrapnel Records. The album features the Tales from the Strip era lineup of the group, which included lead vocalist Phil Lewis, guitarist Stacey Blades, bassist Adam Hamilton and drummer Steve Riley.

Named as a reference to the band's "notoriously raucous" live shows during the 1980s, Loud & Dangerous draws heavily on material from early L.A. Guns releases, including four tracks from L.A. Guns, three from Cocked & Loaded, and one each from Hollywood Vampires and Vicious Circle. The set is rounded out by two tracks from Waking the Dead and one from Rips the Covers Off. The two live videos are for songs originally recorded for Tales from the Strip.

== Background ==
Loud & Dangerous: Live from Hollywood was released on September 12, 2006, by Shrapnel Records. According to a press release issued by the label, the album's title is a reference to "the band's notoriously raucous live concert performances from which they gained a worldwide audience". Recorded on the tour to promote 2005's Tales from the Strip, the album was reportedly conceived only to fulfil the band's two-release contractual obligation to Shrapnel, rather than a second studio release, after L.A. Guns lead vocalist Phil Lewis complained about a perceived lack of promotion for the first. Loud & Dangerous features lead guitarist and backing vocalist Stacey Blades performing lead vocals on "Nothing Better to Do", a track originally sung by bassist Kelly Nickels on 1994's Vicious Circle. The album also features live videos for "Hollywood's Burning" and "It Don't Mean Nothing". The band completed a short US tour in promotion of the album in October and November.

== Reception ==
Professional ratings
Review scores
Source	Rating
AllMusic	3.5/5 stars

Media response to Loud & Dangerous: Live from Hollywood was generally positive. Writing for the music website AllMusic, Greg Prato claimed that "While Loud & Dangerous probably isn't as potent as catching L.A. Guns in a jam-packed Hollywood club back in 1988 (when founding member Tracii Guns was still in attendance), it should please the hairspray-and-headband-wearing faithful". Prato praised the band's choice of material to include, outlining that "Instead of trying to prove to audiences that "if you like the old tunes, then you'll love the new tunes," Lewis, Riley and company wisely stick to the L.A. Guns classics".

James Walsh of the website Sleaze Roxx described Loud & Dangerous as "a good live album by a great band". He praised the live performances by suggesting that "L.A. Guns is known as one of those bands you should go see live because they put on a very fun show ... Simply put, gritty L.A. sleaze rock has never been done better by a better band", and added that the album "is something that you can pop in and be taken away for an hour to a time when musicians actually had enthusiasm and music wasn't more girly than a teen love story". Walsh also noted that all four band members "really show their great live abilities" on the collection.

== Track listing ==
No.	Title	Writer(s)	Original album	Length
1.	"No Mercy"	Tracii Guns; Mick Cripps; Phil Lewis; Nickey Alexander	L.A. Guns (1988)	4:41
2.	"Sex Action"	Guns; Lewis; Paul Black	L.A. Guns (1988)	4:20
3.	"Never Enough"	Guns; Lewis; Cripps; Kelly Nickels; Steve Riley; Gregg Tripp; Phil Roy	Cocked & Loaded (1989)	4:51
4.	"Over the Edge"	Guns; Lewis; Cripps; Nickels; Riley	Hollywood Vampires (1991)	5:57
5.	"Rock N' Roll Outlaw"	Gary Anderson; Mick Cocks; Peter Wells; Gordon Leach; Dallas Royall	Rips the Covers Off (2004)	3:12
6.	"Nothing Better to Do"	Guns; Lewis; Cripps; Nickels	Vicious Circle (1994)	4:08
7.	"Hellraisers Ball"	Guns; Lewis; Adam Hamilton; Riley	Waking the Dead (2002)	3:59
8.	"One More Reason"	Guns; Lewis; Black	L.A. Guns (1988)	3:59
9.	"Electric Gypsy"	Guns; Lewis	L.A. Guns (1988)	5:16
10.	"The Ballad of Jayne"	Guns; Lewis; Cripps; Nickels; Riley	Cocked & Loaded (1989)	5:19
11.	"Rip and Tear"	Guns; Lewis; Cripps; Nickels; Riley	Cocked & Loaded (1989)	4:57
12.	"Don't Look at Me That Way"	Guns; Lewis; Hamilton; Riley	Waking the Dead (2002)	7:34
Total length:				58:13

- The album also features live videos for "Hollywood's Burning" and "It Don't Mean Nothing"

== Personnel ==
- Phil Lewis – lead vocals, rhythm guitar, production
- Stacey Blades – lead guitar, backing vocals, lead vocals (track 6), production
- Adam Hamilton – bass, backing vocals, production, mixing
- Steve Riley – drums, backing vocals, production
- Dave Shultz – mastering
- Brooke McKaig – cover artwork, photography
- Jo Ann Pokorny – photography
- Joe Czebely – video direction
