= Low Stars (album) =

Studio album by Low Stars
- Released: February 2007
- Recorded: 2006 Los Angeles
- Genre: Americana
- Length: 51:45
- Label: DAS; Hear Music; CGSR Group
- Producer: George Drakoulias; Low Stars

Singles from Low Stars
- 1. "Calling All Friends" Released: February 2007

Low Stars is the debut album from Los Angeles band Low Stars. Signed by Hear Music, and released through Starbucks, the album features single "Calling All Friends", which was the theme song for ABC television series What About Brian. "Need a Friend" and "LA Forever" were featured in TV and film respectively. "Just Around the Corner" was the featured video from the album.

The cover photograph by Henry Diltz was taken in Agora Hills at the same location where he shot the cover of the Eagles' Desperado.

== Track listing ==
1. "Tell the Teacher" (Jude/Chris Seefried) – 5:05
2. "Child" (Chris Seefried) – 4:18
3. "Calling All Friends" (Jude/Chris Seefried) – 4:18
4. "Tracks in the Rain" (Chris Seefried) – 4:13
5. "Need a Friend" (Jude/Chris Seefried/Jeff Russo/Dave Gibbs) – 4:09
6. "Can't Live Without Your Love" (Jeff Russo) – 3:41
7. "Just Around the Corner" (Chris Seefried/Jude/Jeff Russo/Dave Gibbs) – 3:55
8. "Why Not Your Baby" (Gene Clark) – 3:58
9. "Love" (Jude) – 2:30
10. "Sometimes It Rains" (Chris Seefried/Jude) – 4:32
11. "Mexico" (Jude) – 3:45
12. "Warmer Wind" (Jude/Chris Seefried) – 4:36
13. "LA Forever" (Chris Seefried/Marshall Altman) – 4:30

== Personnel ==
- Chris Seefried: vocals, acoustic guitar, electric guitar, bass, production
- Dave Gibbs: vocals, acoustic guitar
- Jeff Russo: vocals, acoustic guitar, electric guitar, drums, engineering
- Jude: vocals, acoustic guitar

== Additional personnel ==
- George Drakoulias: producer
- David Immergluck: mandolin, acoustic guitar, pedal steel, dobro
- Brendan O'Brien: bass
- Charlie Gillingham: accordion
- Chris Joyner: piano, Hammond B3
- Zac Rae: Hammond B3, pump organ
- Don Heffington: drums
- Fred Eltringham: drums
- Blair Sinta: drum
- Sheldon Gomberg: double bass, engineering, production
- Dusty Wakeman: bass
- David Wilder: bass
- Gary DeRosa: tambourine
- Ludvig Girdland: violin
- Anna Stafford: violin
- Phillip Vaiman: violin
- Richard Rintoul: viola
- Matt Cooker: cello
- Ben Decter: string arranger
- Fred Kevorkian: mastering
- Jean Marie Horvat: mixing
- Dave Bianco: engineering
- Ryan Williams: engineering, mixing
- Robert Hawes: engineering
- Richard Barron: engineering
- Eric Corne: assistant engineering
- David Vaught: assistant engineering
- Henry Diltz: photography
- Craig Ruda: photography

=== Promotional videos ===
- "Low Stars epk" (2007), directed by Ehud Lazin
- "Calling All Friends" (2007)
- "Child" (2007)
- "Just Around the Corner" (2008), directed by Calire Taylour Sullivan
- "Low Stars and Friends" (2009), directed by Ehud Lazin
