= Love 'Em and Leave 'Em =

Love 'Em and Leave 'Em may refer to:

- Love 'Em and Leave 'Em (album), a demo album by Roxx Gang
- Love 'Em and Leave 'Em (film), a 1926 silent American comedy-drama film
- "Love 'Em and Leave 'Em" (SMBSS episode), an episode of The Super Mario Bros. Super Show!
- "Love 'Em and Leave 'Em", a song by Kiss from Rock and Roll Over
