= Low Stars =

US musical group

- Low Stars

Background information
- Genres: Americana
- Years active: 2005 - present
- Labels: CGSR Group, Hear Music
- Members: Dave Gibbs; Chris Seefried
- Past members: Jeff Russo; Jude
- Website: www.lowstars.com

Low Stars is a musical project of Dave Gibbs and Chris Seefried, that captures the sound of classic bands like Crosby, Stills, and Nash and The Eagles.

== History ==
Low Stars began when Dave Gibbs was holding his annual benefit for the Audrey Hepburn Children's Fund. Chris Seefried was on the bill, as well as Jude, who was added at the last minute. At the time, Gibbs was already playing on another project with Jeff Russo. Afterwards, the group ended up playing and singing on Russo's front porch in Hollywood. When a girl inside heard the music they were playing she commented that she missed that kind of music and the idea for the project was born.

Starbucks Entertainment's attention was caught by the project and they offered to add them to their Hear Music Debut series, which is designed to introduce Starbucks customers to upcoming artists. Hear Music distributes the music via a record label and a XM satellite radio station, which is played in Starbucks Cafes. The Low Stars eponymous album was produced by George Drakoulias and released in Starbucks stores across America.

The songs "Child" and "Calling All Friends", the theme song from ABC's What About Brian, were performed live on Last Call with Carson Daly. They also toured nationally to promote the first album, including a performance at Carnegie Hall to celebrate the music of Bruce Springsteen.

The song "Just around The Corner" was featured in Paste magazine and was the featured video from the album.

== Members ==
Dave Gibbs: Acoustic guitar and vocals.
Gibbs was a founding member of the critically acclaimed 90s alt-pop band Gigolo Aunts. He currently plays bass live with Tom Morello's band and directs the music for Broadway hit musical Rock of Ages.

Chris Seefried: Acoustic/electric guitar, bass, vocals and production.
Seefried's former projects include Gods Child and Joe 90. In 2008 Seefried released his first solo album, titled Denim Blue. He is currently producing and co-writing for hit band Fitz and the Tantrums.

== Discography ==
| Title | Year | Label | Producer |
|---|---|---|---|
| Low Stars | 2007 | DAS Label | George Drakoulias |

=== Promotional videos ===
- "Low Stars epk" (2007), directed by Ehud Lazin
- "Calling All Friends" (2007)
- "Child" (2007)
- "Just Around The Corner" (2008), directed by Claire Tailyour
- "Low Stars and Friends" (2009), directed by Ehud Lazin
