= Gods Child =

American rock band

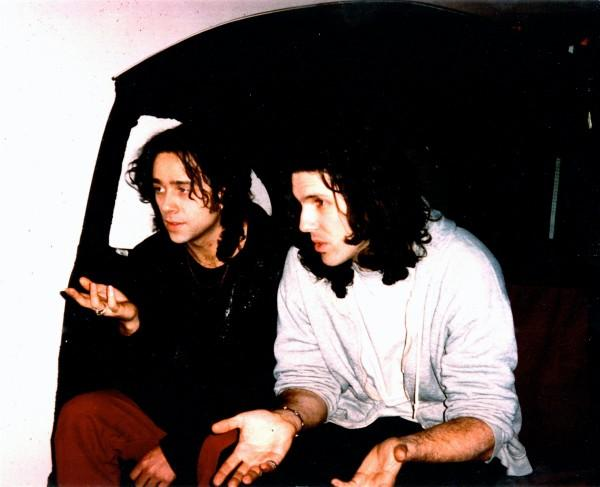
- Chris Seefried and Gary DeRosa at Magic Shop NYC mixing "Everybody", 1994

Background information
- Origin: New York City, New York, United States
- Genres: Alternative rock, psychedelic rock, dream pop
- Years active: 1991–1996
- Label: Qwest/Warner Bros. Records
- Spinoffs: Joe 90
- Past members: Chris Seefried; Gary DeRosa; Craig Ruda; Adam Hamilton; Alex Alexander; Shawn Pelton; Everette Bradley; Mark Plati; Ryan Hedgecock Manager: Steve Tayler Barrett

Gods Child was an American rock band from New York City, New York, formed in 1991 by Chris Seefried (lead vocals and guitar) and Gary DeRosa (keyboards and background vocals). Steve Tayler Barrett, the band's manager, was an integral part of the creative as well as the business side of the band. His input included lyrics, song titles, song structures, styling, band personnel and creative ideas.

Gods Child gained popularity following the release of their debut album, Everybody (1994), which featured the hit single "Everybody's 1". Their second album, Aluminum, was a critics' choice but less of a radio hit.

After touring for this album, the band relocated to Los Angeles and changed their name to Joe 90. They went on to make debut record Dream This for Geffen Records, along with other independent releases.

The band's influences include T.Rex, Lou Reed, Prince, Patti Smith, Sly and The Family Stone, The Doors, Curtis Mayfield, U2, early Blue Öyster Cult and The Beatles.

== History ==
=== Formation ===
Singer/guitarist Chris Seefried and keyboardist Gary DeRosa both grew up in Dix Hills, New York, and played in local bands Mercury and Random Speed.

After graduating from Long Island University and Hofstra University, respectively, Seefried and DeRosa moved to Manhattan and started the duo Brother Brother. Playing gigs all around the city and surrounding boroughs by night and recording demos during the day, they set up shop in the Westbeth building on the Lower West Side. The basement of this artist enclave housed studios for various artists and musicians, including The Lounge Lizards and Suzanne Vega.

DeRosa and Seefried had an 8-track recording studio where they recorded their Brother Brother demos with DeRosa engineering (and where Luscious Jackson recorded their debut record, In Search Of Manny). The demos wound up in the hands of British hit maker at the time, Michael Baker. Having had platinum success with British neo-soul band Wet, Wet, Wet, Baker saw Brother Brother as an American followup, and signed them to his production company Simple Simon, which resulted in a singles and album deal with Chrysalis records U.K. The duo released two charting singles in the U.K., "Temptation Eyes", a cover of the 1960s song by The Grass Roots, and the Seefried-penned "All American". A full-length album was recorded but not released.

After the experience of making major label pop-oriented music, Seefried and DeRosa vowed to have complete control of their music and production from then on. Seefried met Steve Tayler Barrett, an Englishman who worked for HMV group and was looking to start an artist management group. He helped change the band's musical direction to something more akin to his personal taste, which was steeped in the early glam rock traditions of T.Rex. This, coupled with Seefried's love of Lou Reed and Patti Smith formed the foundations of the Gods Child sound.

After settling on a still temporary but powerful group that included Shawn Pelton on drums and Mark Plati, who had mixed the Brother Brother album, on bass, the newly named Gods Child started playing shows in Manhattan at CBGB and opening for national groups at Irving Plaza and the Academy.

After the positive response to the new material, Seefried and DeRosa went back into their Westbeth studio and recorded seven songs. They took these 8-track recordings to various studios in the city and had Pelton overdub drums and percussion. With a residency in the Czech Republic coming up, Seefried and DeRosa took the tapes to Arthur Baker's Shakedown studio in New Jersey and again had Mark Plati do the mixing. As the last mix for the song "Reachin" (with Frank Funaro on drums) was being printed, Seefried and DeRosa left to play the Czech Republic.

During this time Tayler Barrett created a bidding war among major labels for the album, and, having spoken to Hugo Burnham (A&R at Qwest, Quincy Jones' label), started to form a lasting relationship which would lead to Gods Child eventually signing with Qwest/Warner Bros.

=== Everybody ===
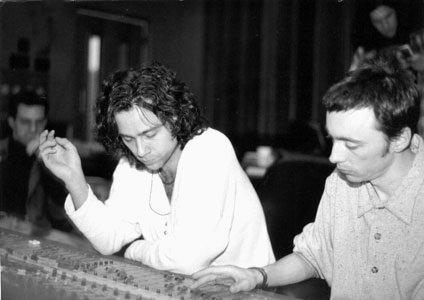
Chris Seefried and Robbie Adams at Hit Factory NYC mixing "Everybody", 1994

Having completed half the record on their own, Seefried and DeRosa, under the pseudonym Bullfrog and The Elephant, now set as producers for the debut, went about finishing the record with new drummer Alex Alexander, who had made the trip to the Czech Republic. The album still reflected their concept of making rock tracks with loops, but now also invited the musical heft they were exploring in their live shows with extended psychedelic instrumentals and poetry jams. New bassist Craig Ruda, who had also grown up in Dix Hills, joined the band toward the end of the record, making his recording debut on the song "Sey". The album was mixed by Robbie Adams, who had recently worked on U2's Achtung Baby, and mixed Zooropa. Both these records had largely incorporated drum loops into a rock-oriented sound.

The record came out and immediately garnered glowing press reaction and a minor hit single. "Everybody's 1" appeared on the Billboard "Modern Rock" and "Album Rock" categories simultaneously. Three music videos were made from the album for songs "Everybody's 1", "Stone Horses" and "Slide".

By year's end, the group had performed on the nationally televised NBC show Late Night with Conan O'Brien, as well as at a WNEW radio Christmas show at New York's Roseland Ballroom.

=== Aluminum ===
After a year and a half of touring nationally as an opener and a headliner, Gods Child started making demos with Luscious Jackson producer Tony Mangurian. The band then relocated to Los Angeles to write songs, play shows and start their second record.

In the transition, Alex Alexander stayed in New York and Gods Child decided to use Tony Mangurian to play drums on their second record. Tim Palmer (who had worked with such acts as Pearl Jam, Sponge, and Mission UK) was brought in to sift through the more than 30 songs (the band having written an album in both New York and Los Angeles), pick the best songs from both periods and produce the record.

With the move to L.A., Gods Child's sound was still littered with damaged sounds, but the songs themselves were more stealthy in arrangement. The result was a soaring, spaced-out sonic gem that was a critics' darling. Although the first single "Female Elvis (I'm the man)" started strong on the radio, getting play in L.A. on KROQ, it failed to chart the way "Everybody's 1" had. "Need" was featured on the Fox Network television series Melrose Place.

Touring ensued as Gods Child found their new drummer, Adam Hamilton, a Shreveport transplant now living in L.A.

Once back in L.A., new demos were written and recorded under the pseudonym The Amazing Adventures of Joe 90. The first, "Sleeping Pill", appeared on an Album Network sampler. With a new city to call home and a new record deal in place at Geffen Records through Adam Duritz's imprint, the latest members of Gods Child decided to record their next record Dream This under the name Joe 90.

== Band members ==
Gods Child line-ups
(1991–1992)	Chris Seefried – lead vocals, guitar; Gary DeRosa – keyboards, vocals, percussion; Ryan Hedgecock – guitar; Mike Duclos – bass; Shawn Pelton – drums
(1992–1993)	Chris Seefried – lead vocals, guitar; Gary DeRosa – keyboards, vocals, percussion; Everette Bradley – percussion, background vocals; Mark Plati – bass; Shawn Pelton – drums
(1994–1995)	Chris Seefried – lead vocals, guitar, mellotron, bass; Gary DeRosa – keyboards, vocals, percussion; Craig Ruda – bass; Alex Alexander – drums
(1995–1996)	Chris Seefried – lead vocals, guitar, keyboards; Gary DeRosa – keyboards, vocals, percussion; Craig Ruda – bass; Adam Hamilton – drums, guitar, bass, loops

== Discography ==
=== Albums ===
Year	Album	Notes
1994	Everybody	As Gods Child
1996	Aluminum	As Gods Child
1999	Dream This	As Joe 90
2000	A Raccoons Lunch	As Joe 90
2000	Boys and Girls	Soundtrack

=== Singles ===
Year	Song	Peak chart positions		Album
Year	Song	US Main. Rock	US Modern Rock	Album
1994	"Everybody's 1"	18	25	Everybody
1994	"Stone Horses"	—	—	Everybody
1996	"Female Elvis (I'm the Man)"	—	—	Aluminum
1996	"This Is the Real World?"	—	—	Aluminum

=== Promotional videos ===
- "Everybody's 1" (1994)
- "Stone Horses" (1994)
- "Slide" (1995)
