= Sixes, Sevens & Nines =

Studio album by Junkyard
- Released: May 28, 1991
- Genre: Rock
- Label: Geffen
- Producer: Ed Stasium

Junkyard chronology
Junkyard (1989)	Sixes, Sevens & Nines (1991)	Joker (1998)

Singles from Junkyard
- 1. "All the Time in the World" Released: 1991

Sixes, Sevens & Nines is the second album by the American band Junkyard, released on May 28, 1991. The first single was "All the Time in the World", which was a rock radio and MTV hit. The band supported the album with a UK tour that was followed by a North American tour opening for Lynyrd Skynyrd.

== Production ==
The album was produced by Ed Stasium. "Slippin' Away" was cowritten by Steve Earle, who also contributed backing vocals to other tracks. Junkyard had a difficult time writing the album, spending almost a year on it, and discarding many songs that they felt were poor; Geffen initially hired songwriters to help them. The band considered the music to be rock that was influenced by punk's attitude. Kenny Aronoff played drums on some of the tracks. "Nowhere to Go but Down" is about drug addiction.

== Critical reception ==
Professional ratings
Review scores
Source	Rating
AllMusic	3/5 stars
Calgary Herald	C+
Chicago Sun-Times	2.5/4 stars
Chicago Tribune	3.5/4 stars
Reno Gazette-Journal	3.5/5 stars
The Rolling Stone Album Guide	3.5/5 stars

The Chicago Tribune said, "Junkyard's riff-happy guitars, boogie-woogie piano and straight-ahead vocals make Sixes, Sevens & Nines a real hip-shaker." The Calgary Herald called the music "still worthwhile straight-ahead rock tossed off in a proficient and streamlined fashion." The St. Petersburg Times labeled the album "a punchy, even paunchy record by five rockers who dedicate themselves more to barroom rearrangements of the three-chord art form than to the preening of their hair."

The Province noted that Sixes, Sevens & Nines "is loaded with editorial comment on their own scene (the attendant posing, drugging and hypocrisy) as well as a few convincing nods to the Stones, the blues and country-rock." The Evening Chronicle labeled Junkyard "a class rock act who generate drive without being overwhelmed by power". LA Weekly considered the band to be "an amped-up answer to Foghat ... equal to or better than the overrated Black Crowes". The Capital Times opined that "their music sounds like a bad mix of Molly Hatchet and Poison."

== Track listing ==
No.	Title	Length
1.	"Back on the Streets"	3:47
2.	"All the Time in the World"	4:09
3.	"Give the Devil His Due"	3:52
4.	"Slippin' Away"	5:24
5.	"Nowhere to Go but Down"	4:27
6.	"Misery Loves Company"	4:00
7.	"Throw It All Away"	3:09
8.	"Killing Time"	6:46
9.	"Clean the Dirt"	3:55
10.	"Lost in the City"	3:31
