= Tales from the Strip =

Studio album by L.A. Guns
- Released: August 16, 2005
- Genres: Hard rock; glam metal
- Length: 57:44
- Label: Shrapnel

L.A. Guns chronology
20th Century Masters (2005)	Tales from the Strip (2005)	Black List (2005)

Professional ratings
Review scores
Source	Rating
AllMusic	3/5 stars

Tales from the Strip is the ninth studio album by American hard rock band L.A. Guns, released in 2005.

It is the second album of L.A. Guns with guitarist Stacey Blades, the first being the cover album Rips the Covers Off released the previous year.

== Track listing ==
1. "It Don't Mean Nothing" - 5:06
2. "Electric Neon Sunset" - 4:40
3. "Gypsy Soul" - 3:04
4. "Original Sin" - 4:25
5. "Vampire" - 4:22
6. "Hollywood's Burning" - 3:44
7. "6.9 Earthshaker" (Instrumental) - 4:06
8. "Rox Baby Girl" - 4:12
9. "Crazy Motorcycle" - 4:19
10. "Skin" - 3:11
11. "Shame" - 4:53
12. "Resurrection" - 3:45
13. "Amanecer" - 3:12
14. "(Can't Give You) Anything Better Than Love" - 4:45

== Personnel ==
- Phil Lewis - lead vocals
- Stacey Blades - guitar
- Adam Hamilton - bass guitar
- Steve Riley - drums
