= Mojo Gurus =

American rock band

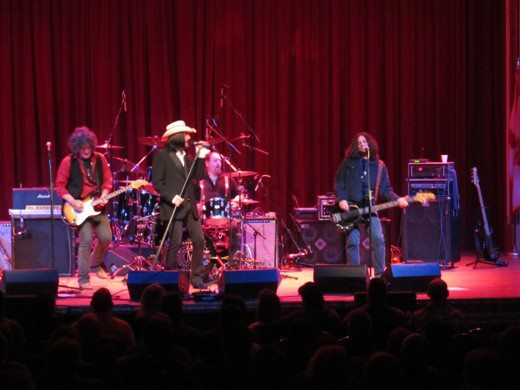

Background information
- Origin: St. Petersburg, Florida, United States
- Genres: Swamp rock; rock and roll; rockabilly; roots rock
- Years active: 2004–present
- Spinoff of: Roxx Gang
- Members: Kevin Steele, Doc Lovett, Vinnie Granese, Sean Doyle
- Website: www.mojogurus.com

Mojo Gurus is an American rock band from St. Petersburg, Florida. The lineup consists of Kevin Steele (lead vocals, harmonica), Doc Lovett (guitar, vocals), Vinnie Granese (bass, vocals) and Sean Doyle (drums and vocals). The band is a successor to the glam band Roxx Gang in terms of lineup, but they have undergone a notable change in musical style, to roots rock influenced by blues and rockabilly.

They have performed throughout the United States as both headliners and as supporting acts for a diverse collection of bands, including David Allan Coe, Joe Perry and Johnny Winter. The band's first release was Hot Damn!. They then collaborated with producer Jack Douglas (known for his work with John Lennon, Aerosmith, and the New York Dolls) and engineer Stephen Marsh (associated with Jeff Beck and Muddy Waters) on the critically acclaimed album Shakin' In The Barn. This was followed by the grittier, more Southern-leaning album Let’s Get Lit With... Mojo Gurus. Their latest album, Who Asked Ya?, features the track "Where You Hidin' Your Love", which was mixed by Tommy Henriksen (known for his work with Lou Reed and Alice Cooper).

== Discography ==
=== Studio albums ===
- Hot Damn! Release date: 2004 Label: Perris Records
- Shakin' In The Barn Release date: 2005 Label: Empire Musicwerks/Universal
- Let's Get Lit with...The Mojo Gurus Release date: 2009 Label: True North Records/E1
- Who Asked Ya? Release date September 16, 2014 Red River Entertainment/RED
- Gone Release date: 2017 Label: MRI Entertainment/Red

== Music videos ==
- Video: "I Can't Stand To Hear That Song Again"
- Director: Christian Moriarty
- Video: "Bandito"
- Director: Christian Moriarty
