= Adam Hamilton (musician) =

American drummer

- Born: Shreveport, Louisiana
- Genres: Glam metal; Alternative rock
- Instruments: Bass; drums; guitar; keyboards; vocals
- Member of: L.A. Guns
- Formerly of: Joe 90; The Brian Jonestown Massacre; Gods Child; C.C. DeVille Experiment; Joey C. Jones and the Glory Hounds; Needle Park

Adam Hamilton is a Los Angeles-based music producer, songwriter, and multi-instrumentalist. Hamilton is a member of glam metal band L.A. Guns as bassist from 2001 through 2007, again from June to September 2018 as their rhythm guitarist, and again as their studio drummer since 2020. He also played drums for 1990s alternative rock band Joe 90, and worked as session drummer for alternative/neo-psychedelic band The Brian Jonestown Massacre.

As a producer, Hamilton has produced albums for several well-known artists, the best known to date being William Shatner for the concept album Seeking Major Tom (2011). He also works extensively producing and writing music for television and film.

== Biography ==
Adam Hamilton was raised in Shreveport, Louisiana, and began playing drums at the age of three. As a child, Hamilton began aspiring to a professional music career through listening to both his father's records and to the music on the radio. While attending Captain Shreve High School, he experimented heavily with production and engineering, and produced demos for local bands in Shreveport. After graduating from high school in 1988, Hamilton moved to Dallas, Texas and then to Austin to pursue music.

While Hamilton was performing at a club in Austin, he met Poison guitarist C.C. DeVille, who invited Hamilton to move to Los Angeles. Hamilton lived in DeVille's home for a time, and played drums in DeVille's post-Poison band The C.C. DeVille Experiment. Other members of this band included Joey C. Jones of 1980s glam metal band Sweet Savage, and Christopher Torok of Liquor Sweet. During the time they were together, The C.C. DeVille Experiment also went by the name The C.C. DeVille Experience. The band, minus DeVille, ended up leaving Los Angeles, relocating to Dallas and Shreveport, and renaming themselves Joey C. Jones and the Glory Hounds, with Hamilton's hometown friend Craig Bradford replacing DeVille on guitar. Joey C. Jones and the Glory Hounds released one self-titled album on Tony Nicole Tony (TNT) Records in 1993; the album featured songs written by C.C. DeVille and by Robin Zander and Rick Nielsen of Cheap Trick.

=== With Joe 90 and The Brian Jonestown Massacre ===
In 1996, the alternative rock band Gods Child hired Hamilton as their touring drummer while touring to support their second album, Aluminum. Upon completion of the tour, the band's music began changing direction, and the band changed their name to Joe 90 to reflect the change. While Hamilton was working with Joe 90, The Brian Jonestown Massacre studio engineer Muddy recruited Hamilton to work as session drummer for the album Give It Back! (1997); Hamilton played drums on three tracks from the album. Hamilton worked as session drummer with The Brian Jonestown Massacre again on Strung Out in Heaven (1998).

In 1999, Counting Crows frontman Adam Duritz signed Joe 90 to his label E Pluribus Unum after frequenting their shows at the Hollywood club The Opium Den. Joe 90 released one album with E Pluribus Unum, entitled Dream This. The band opened for Counting Crows on two different tours. Six different tracks from Dream This appeared in six different television shows: Party Of Five, Buffy the Vampire Slayer, Felicity, Popular, Time of Your Life, and Sports Night. In 2000, Joe 90 recorded a new track, “When You Arrive,” for the movie Boys and Girls. They then released a compilation of demos and odd tracks entitled A Raccoons Lunch.

After leaving Joe 90, Hamilton rejoined his former Joey C. Jones and Gloryhounds bandmate Craig Bradford for a one-off project entitled Needle Park. The resulting album, C'Mon Get Real, was released by Fastlane Records in 2002, and featured guest appearances from Donnie Vie of Enuff Z'nuff and Yogi Lonich of Buckcherry.

=== With L.A. Guns ===
Hamilton joined L.A. Guns in December 2001 as the band's bass player. He was recommended by their departing bass player Muddy Stardust, who had played on L.A. Guns' Man In the Moon album earlier that year. Hamilton toured with the band for the second half of the Man In the Moon tour in early 2002.

Hamilton performed bass and keyboards on the L.A. Guns album Waking the Dead (2002), and co-wrote many of the songs on the album. He toured with L.A. Guns throughout 2002 and 2003 in support of Waking the Dead. In September 2002, Hamilton filled in as drummer for Dokken when the band's drummer Mick Brown had an altercation with the rest of the band and left the tour suddenly; L.A. Guns were on tour with Dokken at the time. An L.A. Guns live show recorded at Pennington's Nightclub in Bradford, UK on April 8, 2003, would later be released on CD and DVD under the name Hellraiser's Ball: Caught in the Act.

Waking the Dead was to be the final L.A. Guns album to feature founder and namesake member Tracii Guns, who would leave the band to form Brides of Destruction with Nikki Sixx of Mötley Crüe. Adam played guitar and drums in the infancy stage of Brides of Destruction with Tracii and Sixx when the band was going by the name Cockstar, but chose to leave the new project and stay with L.A. Guns. Hamilton recommended hairdresser London LeGrand as the Brides of Destruction's lead singer; Sixx and Guns were fascinated with London's rockstar look and hired him for the position.

In January 2004, L.A. Guns recorded their first cover album, Rips the Covers Off, with producer Andy Johns. The album features covers of songs by artists such as David Bowie, Hanoi Rocks, Rose Tattoo, and Iggy and the Stooges to name a few. In May 2005, L.A. Guns began work on Tales from the Strip, again with Andy Johns producing. Tales from the Strip was released August 2005. In early 2006, the band booked some local L.A. shows and recorded them for a live album entitled Loud and Dangerous: Live from Hollywood; this album was released in late August 2006. Each of these albums was supported with a world tour.

While still in L.A. Guns, Hamilton reconnected with C.C. Deville of Poison, who invited Hamilton to assist on the production of the band's covers album, Poison'd! Hamilton worked as production assistant to Don Was for the duration of the project, but was not credited in the finished release. Poison'd! was released by Capitol Records in June 2007.

Hamilton left L.A. Guns in March 2007 to begin working as a writer and producer full time. Hamilton returned briefly to produce the band's second covers album, 2010's Covered in Guns, and played bass and keyboards on that album. Hamilton also contributed to the songwriting on L.A. Guns' 2012 album Hollywood Forever. On June 19, 2018, he rejoined L.A. Guns as their rhythm guitarist replacing their previous rhythm guitarist Johnny Monaco.

== As producer ==
Hamilton chose to begin working as a producer and writer full time in 2006 due in part to his desire to marry and start a family. His production work includes many titles released by Cleopatra Records, including albums by Leif Garrett, Dale Bozzio of Missing Persons, Vanilla Ice, and George Lynch. Hamilton also produces and writes music for television, and his work has appeared on Family Guy, The Simpsons, The Osbournes, Six Feet Under, Saturday Night Live, Numb3rs, Gene Simmons Family Jewels, Bones, America's Got Talent, and many others.

Hamilton's most notable production work on an album was as producer of William Shatner's third studio album, Seeking Major Tom (2011). Cleopatra Records founder Brian Perera teamed Shatner up with Hamilton for the project, and Shatner made Hamilton prove himself to him with the production of the hardest song on the prospective album, which was a cover of Queen's "Bohemian Rhapsody". Shatner was happy with the results and Hamilton produced the rest of the album. The album was recorded primarily in Pro Tools and included many well-known guest performers, including Nick Valensi, Ritchie Blackmore, Candice Night, Lyle Lovett, Brad Paisley, Steve Miller, Ian Paice, Johnny Winter, Steve Hillage, Bootsy Collins, Patrick Moraz, Toots Hibbert, Peter Frampton, John Wetton, Wayne Kramer, Carmine Appice, Sheryl Crow, Michael Schenker, Ernie Watts, Edgar Froese, Dave Davies, Warren Haynes, Mike Inez, Zakk Wylde, and Steve Howe. The album debuted at #1 on Billboard's Heatseekers chart and received positive reviews from many publications and websites.

== In other media ==
Hamilton's song "Army Of One" was featured in "Clash of the Tritons", an episode of the American television series Veronica Mars.

== Discography ==
=== With Joey C. Jones and the Glory Hounds ===
- Joey C. Jones and the Glory Hounds (1993)

=== With The Brian Jonestown Massacre ===
- Give It Back! (1997)
- Strung Out in Heaven (1998)

=== With Joe 90 ===
- Dream This (1999)
- A Raccoons Lunch (2000)

=== With Needle Park ===
- C'Mon Get Real (2002)

=== With L. A. Guns ===
- Waking the Dead (2002)
- Rips the Covers Off (2004)
- Tales from the Strip (2005)
- Various Artists: VH1 Classic Presents: Metal Mania - Stripped (2005) ("The Ballad of Jayne" - new recording)
- Loud and Dangerous: Live from Hollywood (2006)
- Hellraiser's Ball: Caught in the Act (2008)
- Covered in Guns (2010)
- Hollywood Forever (2012) (songwriting credits only)
- Checkered Past (2021) (drums on all tracks)
- Black Diamonds 2023 (drums on all tracks)

=== With Poison ===
- Poison'd! (2007) (uncredited)

=== As a producer ===
- Joe 90: Dream This (1999)
- Needle Park: C'Mon Get Real (2002)
- Various Artists: VH1 Classic Presents: Metal Mania - Stripped (2005) (new recordings of L. A. Guns' "The Ballad of Jayne" and Great White's "Save Your Love")
- Leif Garrett: Three Sides Of... (2007)
- Dale Bozzio: New Wave Sessions (2007)
- Vanilla Ice: Vanilla Ice is Back! Hip Hop Classics (2008)
- Johnny Thunders: Sticks & Stones: The Lost Album (2009) (mastering)
- Various Artists: Abbey Road: Tribute to The Beatles (2009)
- Various Artists: An All-Star Salute to Christmas (2009)
- Various Artists: Platinum Hip-Hop Hits: Old School Classics From the '80s & '90s (2009)
- L.A. Guns: Covered in Guns (2010)
- George Lynch: Orchestral Mayhem (2010)
- Vains of Jenna: Reverse Tripped (2011)
- William Shatner: Seeking Major Tom (2011)
- Black Water Bride: Black Water Bride (2013)
- Various Artists: A Psych Tribute to The Doors (2014)
- Missing Persons: Dreaming (2020)
- Ghosts Of Sunset: Headed West Golden Robot Records EP. Drums and keys on "Never Goodbye"; mixer on 5 of 6 songs (2021)
- Missing Persons: Hollywood Lie (2023)
