= Pop Culture Press =

Music magazine

Pop Culture Press is a music magazine founded in 1986 in Memphis, Tennessee that covered the local Memphis underground scene as well as touring bands and underground music of the era. PCP, as it was sometimes known, moved to Austin, Texas in 1988 and expanded its coverage to include national and international artists, while keeping a focus on Memphis and Texas music. Pop Culture Press was made popular by its sampler CD, which included music from Cotton Mather, Spoon, The Wedding Present, They Might be Giants and others (see list below). Prior to that, the magazine offered free flexi-discs, featuring songs from The Dentists, Dream Syndicate, Elastica and many more. Some of the sampler CDs and flexi-discs are now collector's items. Pop Culture Press was distributed around the world (UK, Europe, Japan, Australia, Canada, Southeast Asia) via Tower Records, Virgin Records, and other distribution outlets.

Pop Culture Press was founded and edited by Luann Williams. Vanessa Dawne took over as editor from 1988-1990 and then transitioned to editor for the flourishing Memphis music scene. Williams continued as Managing Editor until Luke Torn, who has also written for The Wall Street Journal, Mojo, and The Austin Chronicle, took over in 2005. Over 100 writers from all over the world, many of whom went on to become music journalists for major publications, contributed throughout the magazine's history. There were sixty-six issues published, before it became a blog which eventually stopped updating in 2010. The current website, which includes archival articles and reviews, is https://www.popculturepress.net/. Luann Williams revived the magazine's trademark to create Pop Culture Press Records. Pop Culture Press Records has released two titles from LA indie band The Black Watch CD+LP: The End Of When (2013) and Sugarplum Fairy, Sugarplum Fairy (2015).

== Bands on Pop Culture Press CD Samplers ==
- Cotton Mather
- Spoon
- Magnapop
- Died Pretty
- The Dentists
- They Might Be Giants
- Kelly Willis
- Jimmy Eat World
- The Wedding Present
- Ass Ponys
- Tommy Keene
- Mark Eitzel
- Velocity Girl
