= Stacey Blades =

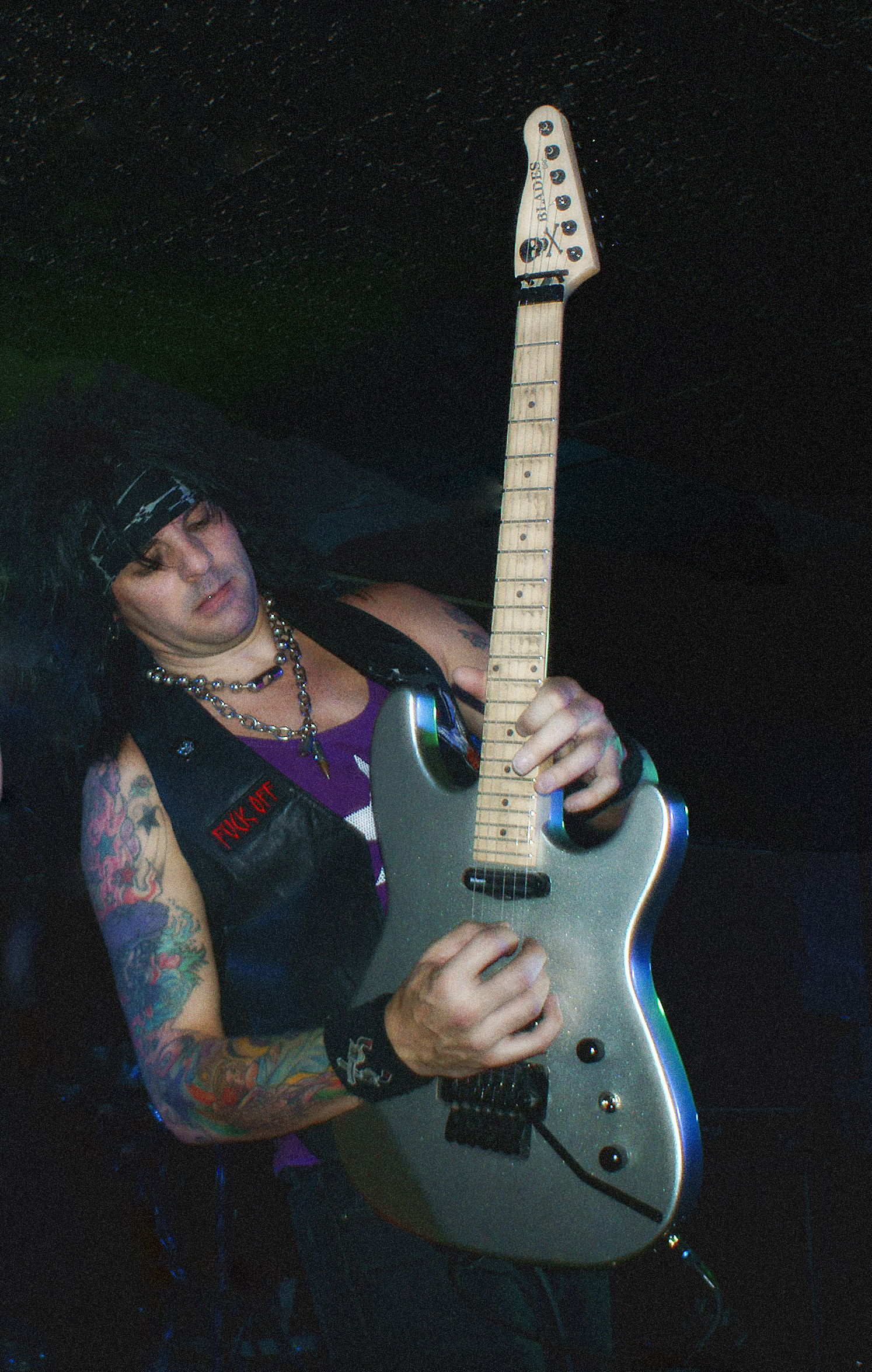
- Blades with L.A. Guns in 2011

Background information
- Born: November 4, 1968 (age 57); Calgary, Alberta, Canada
- Genres: Glam metal, hard rock
- Occupation: Musician
- Instrument: Guitar

Stacey David Blades is a guitarist originally from Calgary, Alberta, Canada, who has played with such bands as Fraidy Katt, Roxx Gang, Supercool, L.A. Guns, and Electric Radio Kings. He has played on the L.A. Guns studio albums Rips the Covers Off, Tales from the Strip, Covered in Guns, and Hollywood Forever, and the L.A. Guns live album Loud and Dangerous: Live from Hollywood. He authored a book Confessions of a Replacement Rockstar in 2009 Via Booksurge and Amazon.

In 2009, Blades released his first guitar instrumental solo album called Symphonic Slam on Cleopatra Records.

At the end of 2012, Blades decided to leave L.A. Guns to pursue more personal opportunities for performing and songwriting. He worked with Sony Music designing and writing guitar loop packages. Blades was also the last artist to work with producer Andy Johns before his death in April 2013. From 2017 to 2020 Blades achieved some success with his active rock band "Electric Radio Kings" charting No. 28 on Billboard Mainstream Rock charts with their remake of Amy Winehouse's "Back To Black" and released a full-length album Purrr produced by longtime Metallica engineer Michael Gillies. The album was released via MI5/Universal. The band however imploded and turned into the alternative "Crashing Wayward" who released their first single "Breathe" on February 12, 2021, again produced by Mike Gillies (Metmixer).

== Discography ==
=== With Fraidy Katt ===
Scratched — FNA Records -Reissue (1990/91)

=== With Roxx Gang ===
- High Five - 5 song EP (1993)
- The Voodoo You Love (1995)
- Old, New, Borrowed, and Blue (1998)
- Drinkin' T.N.T. And Smoking' Dynamite (Available as both a Roxx Gang album and a Mojo Gurus album) (2000)
- Bodacious Ta Tas (2001)

=== With Supercool ===
- Live at the Wilcox Hotel (2001)

=== With L.A. Guns ===
- Rips the Covers Off (2004)
- Tales from the Strip (2005)
- Loud and Dangerous: Live from Hollywood (2006)
- Covered in Guns (2010)
- Hollywood Forever (2012)

=== Solo ===
- Symphonic Slam

=== With Electric Radio Kings ===
- Purrr (2019)
