= Chris Seefried =

American singer-songwriter

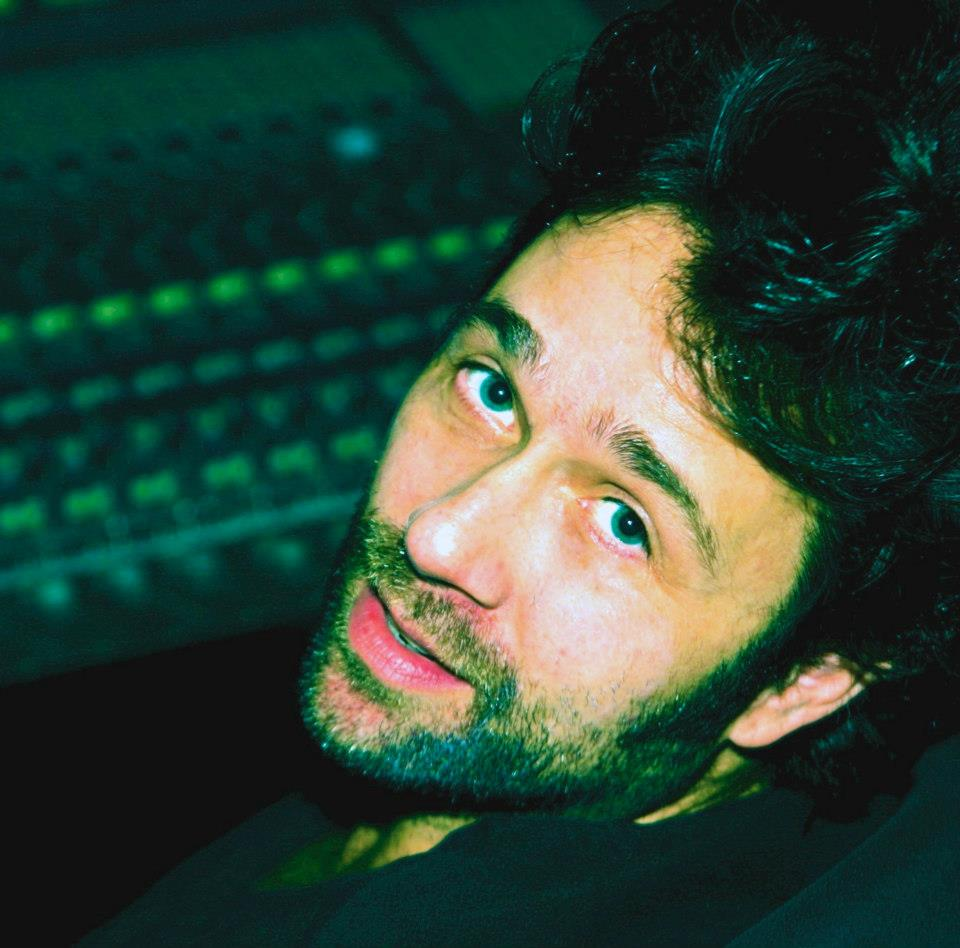

Background information
- Also known as: Bullfrog (producer)
- Born: October 20, 1966 (age 58); New York City, New York, U.S.
- Genres: Rock, folk, pop, soul, R&B
- Occupation(s): Singer, musician, songwriter, record producer
- Instrument(s): Vocals, guitar
- Years active: 1990–present
- Labels: Warner Bros., Geffen, Hear Music, E Pluribus Unum, Chrysalis
- Member of: Low Stars
- Formerly of: Gods Child, Joe 90
- Website: bkentertainmentgroup.com/chris-seefried

Chris Seefried is an American singer, musician, songwriter, and record producer. He is best known as the lead vocalist and frontman of the bands Gods Child, Joe 90, and Low Stars, and as producer and co-writer for the neo-soul band Fitz and the Tantrums.

== Career ==
=== Gods Child (1992–1996) ===
Seefried's career in the United States started when a cassette tape of "Everybody's 1" was heard by Prince, who stopped the song midway through, ejected the tape and declared "this is mine". That song and four other psychedelic rock and soul tracks found their way to legendary artist, producer, musician and then record company president Quincy Jones and his A&R man Hugo Burnham, drummer from English post-punk band Gang of Four. After flying to New York City to see Gods Child perform one of many shows at New York's CBGB, they signed the band to Warner Bros. Records via Quincy's imprint label Qwest.

The band's first record, Everybody, was written and produced by Seefried with bandmate Gary DeRosa under the pseudonym "Bullfrog and the Elephant".

The single "Everybodys 1" charted on two Billboard charts simultaneously, peaking at #18 on the Mainstream Rock chart and #25 on the Modern Rock chart.

While making videos for songs "Everybody's 1", "Stone Horses" and "Slide", Gods Child toured nationally, headlining shows in New York City at Irving Plaza and Roseland Ballroom. They performed "Everybody's 1" on NBC's Late Night with Conan O'Brien.

Their second record, Aluminum, produced by Tim Palmer, was critically acclaimed, but the singles "Female Elvis" and "This Is the Real World?" only charted regionally. The song "Need" was featured on the Fox Network television series Melrose Place.

=== Joe 90 (1996–2000) ===
After two albums with Warner Bros., Seefried moved to Los Angeles and changed the band's name from Gods Child to Joe 90, adding Adam Hamilton to the mix.

Adam Duritz of Counting Crows signed the group to his imprint through Geffen Records. Their debut record Dream This includes the hit song "Drive", which Duritz sings on. Seefried returned the favor, guesting on "I Wish I Was a Girl"' and hit song "Hangin' Around" from This Desert Life. Joe 90 performed this song live with Counting Crows on Late Night with Conan O'Brien.

Their second album, A Raccoons Lunch, features the Laura Nyro song "And When I Die", which was the end title for the New Line Cinema film Final Destination, and "When You Arrive" from the soundtrack for the film Boys and Girls.

The band's third record remains unreleased.

=== Solo/Low Stars (2000–present) ===
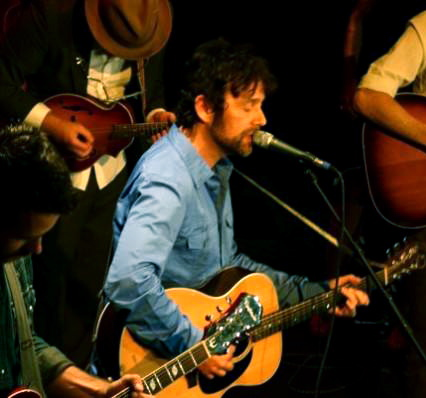
Seefried performing

Seefried recorded solo debut Denim Blue in between touring as Rosanne Cash's guitar player. It was recorded in studios in New York City and Los Angeles, and includes a cast of friends, Gary DeRosa (Gods Child, Joe 90), Tony Shanahan (Patti Smith), Richard Lloyd (Television), as well as co-producers David Immergluck (Counting Crows) and Rich Pagano (Fab Faux).

Denim Blue, completed in 2005, was held back because Seefried started southern California rock band Low Stars, whose debut album used tracks "Child", "Tracks In the Rain" and "L.A. Forever", previously slotted for Denim Blue. Low Stars' eponymous debut album was produced by George Drakoulias and was released in 2007 at Starbucks stores throughout the country through Hear Music.

Low Stars performed songs "Calling All friends", the theme song that appears at the beginning of each episode of J. J. Abrams' show What About Brian, and "Child", on Last Call with Carson Daly. They capped a national tour with a performance of "One Step Up" at Carnegie Hall to celebrate the music of Bruce Springsteen.

Denim Blue was released through Seefried's record label "Gnome Alone" in 2008. The songs "Hand of Fate" and "You Make Me" were included in the Tomothy Bogart film Touched.

=== Production/songwriting ===
Seefried produced and co-wrote Fitz and the Tantrums' EP Songs for a Breakup, Vol. 1 which was recorded during the first half of 2009 at Fitzpatrick's home in Los Angeles. He also produced and co-wrote their debut studio album, Pickin' Up the Pieces, released in August 2010, which received critical acclaim and reached No. 1 on the Billboard Heatseekers chart. They were heralded as a "band to watch" in an April 2011 profile in Rolling Stone.

In 2012 Seefried produced Anderson East's self-released debut album, Flowers of the Broken Hearted. The album was released on vinyl and consisted of two records: one which he recorded in Los Angeles with session players Charlie Gillingham, Don Heffington and Rob Wasserman, and one recorded in Nashville with Tim Brennan and Daniel Scobey. Each record has its own genre; the white disc, mostly written and produced by Seefried, has a progressive soul and Americana vibe, while the red disc is darker and has more of a rock sound.

Seefried composed four songs on the Fitz and the Tantrums release More Than Just a Dream, released on May 7, 2013, on Elektra/Atlantic records.

Jessica Sager of Pop Crush wrote, "three unreleased Lana Del Rey songs have also emerged. 'Boarding School', co-written and produced by Chris Seefried, has a 1960s vibe and describes, in vivid detail, Del Rey's past alcohol and drug use — she even describes "smoking crack in the back". To say it's as dark as her new hair color is an understatement, but the tune and melody are actually laidback and fun, which makes the track all the more intriguing and effective. It perfectly encompasses the 'gangsta Nancy Sinatra' Del Rey longs to embody."

Seefried co-wrote two songs and produced one on Cheers to the Fall, the first studio album by Andra Day. Warner Bros. Records alongside Buskin Records released the album on August 28, 2015. Day worked with Adrian Gurvitz, Raphael Saadiq and Seefried in the production of this album. The album was nominated for Best R&B Album at the 58th Annual Grammy Awards.

== In popular culture ==
- The end title for the film Final Destination is the Laura Nyro song "And When I Die" as performed by Joe 90.
- The end title for the New Line Cinema film Body Shots is the Joe 90 song "Cars Go By".
- Seefried wrote and performed "You All Everybody" for "The Moth", the seventh episode of the first season of Lost, with Jude.
- The theme song for the TV series What About Brian is "Calling All Friends", co-written by Seefried and performed by Low Stars.
- Fitz and the Tantrums' song "Dear Mr. President" was used in a Wells Fargo Bank commercial.
