= Jude (singer) =

American singer and songwriter

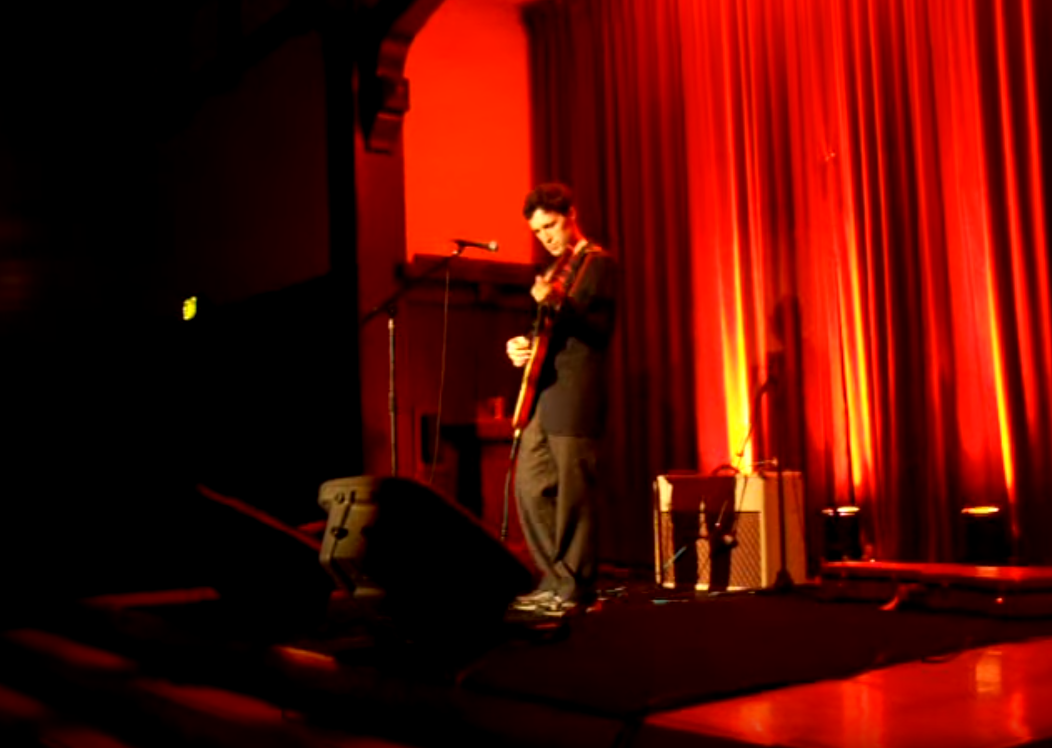
- Jude performing his song "Madonna" at The Swedish American Hall in 2006

Background information
- Born: Michael Jude Christodal; October 16, 1969 (age 56)
- Origin: Boston, Massachusetts, United States
- Genres: Indie, acoustic, rock
- Years active: 1997—present
- Labels: Fish of Death (1997); Maverick 1998-2001; Naïve Records (2004-present)

Jude (born Michael Jude Christodal, October 16, 1969, Boston, Massachusetts) is an American singer and songwriter.

== History ==
Jude's debut album, 430 N. Harper Ave, was released independently by the Fish of Death label in 1997. Maverick signed Jude and released his second album, No One Is Really Beautiful which contained several re-recordings of some of the debut album's tracks. Two tracks from No One Is Really Beautiful charted: "I'm Sorry Now" (#33 Billboard Adult Top 40 Chart) and "Rick James" (#29 Billboard Adult Top 40 Chart, #28 Billboard Modern Rock Chart).

The song "I Know" was featured on the multi-platinum City of Angels soundtrack. The song "I Do" from No One Is Really Beautiful was used in several television shows. During this time, Jude also toured with Alanis Morissette, Ben Folds Five, The Cranberries, Dido, Tori Amos, Better Than Ezra, Train, and Chris Isaak.

His follow-up album, King of Yesterday was released on September 11, 2001. The album featured a cover of Bread's "Everything I Own". Jude soon parted ways with Maverick and produced his subsequent albums independently (Sarah in 2004 and Redemption in 2006).

Currently, Jude is signed with Naive records in Paris, France. Naive released Redemption in Europe in September 2006, and released the single "Save Me" via iTunes in October. The whole album was released in the US in November 2006.

In 2006, Jude, Chris Seefried, Jeff Russo and Dave Gibbs formed the band Low Stars. They released an eponymous CD through the Starbucks Hear music label in 2007. The song "Calling All Friends", which appears on the album and was penned by Jude, is the theme for the ABC drama What About Brian. In August 2007, Jude left the Low Stars.

Jude is currently based in Los Angeles, writing songs for film and television. In 2015, he launched a PledgeMusic campaign to record the EP Me and My Monster, which was released in 2016.

== Use in other media ==
- "The Way That You Want Me" and "I Know" were each featured in 2010 episodes of the television series, House
- "Out of L.A." was featured in the premiere episode of the television series, Men of a Certain Age
- "Love, Love, Love" was featured in a 2007 episode of the television drama, What About Brian; "Stay" was featured in the last scene of the final episode of that series.
- "Crescent Height Shuffle" features on a TV advertisement for Miller Genuine Draft that was first broadcast in Ireland in May 2007.
- "Save Me" was featured in Season 4 premiere episode of The O.C., "The Avengers", and was also used as a pre-season on-line promotion. "Out of LA" was featured in a 2005 episode of the series.
- "Everything's Alright (I Think It's Time)" and "All I Wanna Do" were featured in separate episode of the television series, Alias.
- "Everything's Alright (I Think It's Time)" appeared in the film The Animal.
- "I Know" was featured on the 1998 City of Angels soundtrack.
- "I Do" has been used in several television series.
- "I Do" and "I'm Sorry Now" were featured in the television series "Dawson's Creek".
- "I Do" and "King of Yesterday" were featured in the television series Felicity.
- "King of Yesterday" was featured in the films Not Another Teen Movie and Bubble Boy.
- "Everything I Own" was featured in the pilot episode of Smallville, an episode of the television series Crossing Jordan and a season 3 episode of Roswell
- "You Mama You" and several other songs appeared in the film Barry Munday.
- "The One You Really Love" was featured in season 1 episode 7, and a new recording of "Madonna" in the finale episode of the television series Banshee
- Performed "My Name is Death" for the film Final Destination 2 during Brian's death and the end credits.
- In the television series Lost, the song "You All, Everybody" (with Chris Seefried)

== Discography ==
=== Albums ===
- 430 N. Harper Ave. (1997)
1. I Will Not Die – 3:06
2. Out of L.A. – 3:14
3. You Mama You – 2:20
4. George – 2:52
5. Paper Towel – 4:44
6. In Between 3:16
7. Prophet – 3:45
8. Life Lays Me Down / Shoes My Size – 5:26
9. Baby Ruth in Atlanta – 5:19
10. Love Letters – 3:10
11. Cammie – 5:19
12. More Than I Wanted – 4:18
- You're So Hot I Love You (EP)
1. Brad and Suzy (remix) – 4:05
2. Prophet (live) – 4:17
3. I'm Sorry Now (live) – 3:43
4. Homerun Hillary – 3:18
5. Out of L.A. (live) – 4:48
6. The Asshole Song – 4:03
- No One Is Really Beautiful (1998)
1. You Mama You – 2:20
2. Charlie Says – 4:20
3. I'm Sorry Now – 4:23
4. Rick James – 4:42
5. Battered Broken – 4:58
6. I Do – 4:50
7. Prophet – 4:04
8. Out of L.A. – 4:01
9. I Know – 4:34
10. She Gets the Feeling – 4:26
11. George – 3:21
12. Brad and Suzy – 4:37
13. The Asshole Song – 4:04
- King of Yesterday (2001) #47 France
1. King of Yesterday
2. Everything's Alright (I Think It's Time)
3. Red Room
4. The Not So Pretty Princess
5. Everything I Own
6. Sit Ups
7. Indian Lover
8. Oh Boy
9. I Do
10. I Will Not Die
11. Teenage Girlfriend
12. King of Yesterday (radio remix)
- Sarah (2004) #67 France
1. Madonna – 3:48
2. Perfect Plank – 3:16
3. You and Me – 4:39
4. Crescent Heights – 2:46
5. If You Need – 3:36
6. Your Love is Everything – 4:45
7. Living Together – 1:57
8. Black Superman – 4:06
9. Isn't It Over – 4:24
- Redemption (2006) #131 France
1. All I Want to Do – 4:24
2. Save Me – 3:53
3. Dreaming – 4:15
4. Love Love Love – 3:24
5. Run to My Room – 3:27
6. End of My Rainbow – 3:50
7. Your Eyes – 3:21
8. Breakup Song – 2:37
9. She's Getting Married – 4:12
10. Stay – 4:20
11. Money – 3:57
12. Beautiful Loser – 2:21
13. Fly Again – 3:12
14. Taking More and Giving Less (live) – 5:06
- Cuba (2008) - rarities and out-takes
1. Cuba
2. Beautiful Bleached-Out Blonde
3. The Rider Comes
4. The Rider Comes 2
5. In The Country
6. Everybody Party On The Dance Floor
7. Helmut Dance
8. One of These Days
9. Outside My Window
10. Prima Ballerina
11. G-Blues
12. My Bonnie
- Me & My Monster (2016) (EP)
1. Me & My Monster – 3:54
2. The Way That You Want Me – 3:11
3. Woman – 3:59
4. Money – 3:57
5. Madonna – 6:19
6. Moving On - 4:36
