= Everybody (Gods Child album) =

Studio album by Gods Child
- Released: 1994
- Recorded: 1994
- Studios: Pilot, New York City
- Genre: Rock
- Length: 54:48
- Labels: Qwest; Warner Bros.
- Producers: Chris Seefried, Gary DeRosa

Gods Child chronology
Everybody (1994)	Aluminum (1996)

Singles from Everybody
- 1. "Everybody's 1" Released: June 1994; 2. "Stone Horses" Released: September 1994

Everybody is the debut album by the New York City-based band Gods Child, released in 1994. The band members (Chris Seefried on vocals, guitars, and Mellotron; Gary DeRosa on keyboards; Craig Ruda on bass; and Alex Alexander on drums, percussion, and loops) are all from New York City. The album was produced by Seefried and DeRosa under the pseudonym Bullfrog and the Elephant. The cover photograph is of an amusement ride at Coney Island.

"Everybody's 1" appeared on two Billboard charts in 1994. The song peaked at No. 18 on the Mainstream Rock chart and No. 25 on the Modern Rock Tracks chart.

== Critical reception ==
Professional ratings
Review scores
Source	Rating
AllMusic	3/5 stars

The Philadelphia Daily News deemed the album "edgy, acidy rock from the underbelly of New York City, late-'60s, early-'70s retro but with rap technology."

== Track listing ==
All tracks are written by Chris Seefried unless noted.

Everybody
No.	Title	Length
1.	"Wolf"	6:03
2.	"Everybody's 1"	5:58
3.	"14th Street" (Seefried, Lou Reed)	1:03
4.	"Stone Horses"	3:09
5.	"Crucial" (Seefried, Marc Bolan)	5:31
6.	"Milk"	7:07
7.	"Silver Sky Pilot"	4:46
8.	"Monkey Pin-Ups"	0:16
9.	"Slide"	4:47
10.	"Reachin"	4:51
11.	"Sey"	6:05
12.	"Watching the Dog Stars"	4:04

== Personnel ==
- Chris Seefried – vocals, electric guitar, acoustic guitar, Mellotron, bass, percussion, samples
- Gary DeRosa – wurlitzer piano, strings, casio, synthesizer, percussion, background vocals, loops
- Alex Alexander – drums, percussion
- Craig Ruda – bass

Additional personnel

- Sean Pelton – drums on "Everybody's 1"
- Frank Funaro – drums on "Reachin'"
- Everette Bradley – background vocals on "Reachin'"
- Mark Plati – bass on "Wolf", "Milk"
- Greg Calbi – mastering
- Grant Austin – engineer
- Will Schillinger – engineer
- Robbie Adams – mixing
- Larry Bussacca – photography
- Hugo Burnham – A&R
- Elizabeth Tirone – art direction

== Charts ==
Year	Single	Chart	Position
1994	"Everybody's 1"	Billboard Mainstream Rock Tracks	18
1994	"Everybody's 1"	Billboard Modern Rock Tracks	25
