= Aluminum (album) =

Studio album by Gods Child
- Released: July 1996
- Recorded: July 1995, Brooklyn; October 1995, Los Angeles
- Genre: Alternative rock; indie rock; pop rock
- Length: 43:48
- Label: Warner Bros.
- Producer: Tim Palmer

Gods Child chronology
Everybody (1994)	Aluminum (1996)	Dream This (1999)

Singles from Aluminum
- 1. "Female Elvis (I'm The Man)" Released: July 1996; 2. "This Is The Real World?" Released: November 1996

Professional ratings
Review scores
Source	Rating
Allmusic	4/5 stars

Aluminum was the second album from New York City band Gods Child.

Produced by Tim Palmer (who has worked with such acts as Pearl Jam, Sponge, and Mission UK), the album features a spaced-out aura, solid musicianship and soaring sonics. It is littered with damaged guitars, distressed mellotron, and raw vocals.

Aluminum was critically acclaimed, but singles "Female Elvis" and "This is the Real World?" only charted regionally. "Need" was featured in the Fox Network television series Melrose Place.

After this album, the band moved from New York City to Los Angeles and recorded their follow-up album Dream This under the new moniker Joe 90 in 1999.

== Track listing ==
All tracks are written by Chris Seefried unless noted.

Aluminum
No.	Title	Length
1.	"This Is the Real World?"	4:04
2.	"Princess, Princess"	4:01
3.	"Need"	3:19
4.	"Female Elvis"	3:45
5.	"Space Boy"	4:52
6.	"2001"	3:47
7.	"Heart of Extasy"	5:06
8.	"Picture This"	4:13
9.	"Lift Me Up" (Seefried, DeRosa, Ruda)	4:23
10.	"Serve Yourself"	5:58

== Credits and personnel ==
- Chris Seefried – vocals, electric guitar, 12 string acoustic guitar, bass, percussion, samples
- Gary DeRosa – piano, mellotron, organ, casio, synthesizer, percussion, background vocals, loops
- Craig Ruda – bass

Additional personnel

- Tim Palmer – producer
- Tony Mangurian – drums
- Mark O'Donoughue – engineer
- Eric Tucker – photography
- Hugo Burnham – A&R
- Mike Ainsworth – assistant engineer
- Ryan Arnold – assistant engineer

== Singles ==
Year	Single
1996	"Female Elvis (I'm the Man)"
1996	"This Is the Real World?"
