= Subterranea =

Subterranea may refer to:

- Subterranea (album), album by the band IQ
- Subterranea (comics), fictional underground land of the Mole Man in Marvel Comics
- Subterranea, game for the Atari 2600 published by Imagic
- Subterranea (geography), catch-all category for caves, mines, and other subterranean features
- Subterranea, a soundtrack by Thom Yorke
- Subterranea, a 2015 American film starring Bug Hall
- Subterranea (TV series), a 2024 Kenyan Sci-fi series directed by Likarion Wainaina
