= Hellraisers Ball: Caught in the Act =

Live album by L.A. Guns
- Released: June 27, 2008
- Genre: Hard rock; glam metal
- Label: Dreamcatcher

L.A. Guns chronology
| Loud and Dangerous: Live from Hollywood (2006) | Hellraisers Ball: Caught in the Act (2008) | Covered in Guns (2010) |

Professional ratings
Review scores
| Source | Rating |
|---|---|
| AllMusic | 3/5 stars |

Hellraisers Ball: Caught in the Act is a live music album by the L.A. Guns, released in 2008 and recorded at Penningtons Club in Bradford (UK), on April 8, 2003. A DVD version was released by Snapper Music in 2005. It is the only album to feature Keri Kelli (lead guitar) and Brent Muscat (guitar).

In 2019, it was reissued as Electric Gypsy: Live with a different album cover by Secret Records.

== Track listing ==
1. "Over the Edge"
2. "Kiss My Love Goodbye"
3. "Never Enough"
4. "Sex Action"
5. "Revolution"
6. "Long Time Dead"
7. "Beautiful"
8. "Hellraisers Ball"
9. "Don't Look at Me That Way"
10. "One More Reason"
11. "Electric Gypsy"
12. "The Ballad of Jayne"
13. "Rip and Tear"

== Personnel ==
- Phil Lewis – lead vocals
- Keri Kelli – lead guitar
- Brent Muscat – guitar
- Adam Hamilton – bass guitar
- Steve Riley – drums
