= The Black Watch (band) =

US musical group

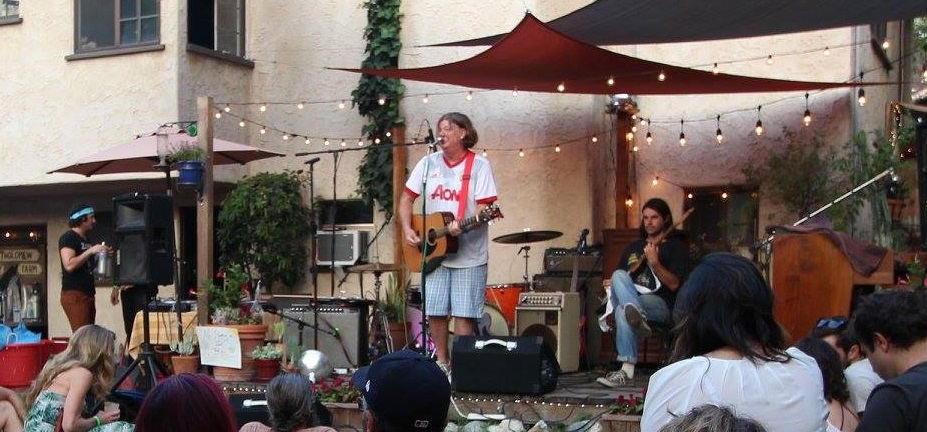
- The Black Watch performing in 2018

Background information
- Origin: Santa Barbara, California, United States
- Genres: Indie rock
- Years active: 1987—present
- Labels: Eskimo, Stonegarden, Pink Hedgehog, Saltwater, Not Lame, Catapult, Zero Hour Records, Doctor Dream, Pop Culture Press Records, Atom Records
- Members: John Andrew Fredrick; Chris Rackard; Rick Woodard; Tyson Cornell
- Past members: Linnea Ahms, J'Anna Jacoby, Roger Butchers, Randy Leasure, Darin Danford, Gary Sullivan, Tim Boland, Scott Taylor, Kenny Sonoquie, Steven Schayer, Andy Creighton

The Black Watch is an American independent rock band from Santa Barbara, California, United States, whose only constant member has been singer, guitarist, and primary songwriter, John Andrew Fredrick. Through their thirty years in the recording industry, the group has affiliated with at least ten different record labels.

Fredrick formed the band in 1987 after earning his Ph.D. in English from University of California, Santa Barbara. After recording St. Valentine and releasing it on eskimo, Fredrick's own label, violinist J'Anna Jacoby joined the group and the two of them formed the nucleus of the band until she left the group in 2003.

The Black Watch has recorded and toured consistently throughout its history except for a brief period in 1997 when the band broke up. During this hiatus, Fredrick wrote The King of Good Intentions, a semi-autobiographical novel about an indie rock band. The band recorded a CD of the same title intended as a companion piece to the novel, although the planned publication of the novel was cancelled when the publisher folded.

In 2008, guitarist and singer Steven Schayer (formerly of the Los Angeles band Clay Idols, and New Zealand band The Chills) joined, and Fredrick wrote and published a book of fiction, The Knucklehead Chronicles.

In 2013, The band released The End of When on Pop Culture Press Records. Fredrick's novel The King of Good Intentions was finally published, and soon after, its sequel, and the band issued Sugarplum Fairy, Sugarplum Fairy (largely recorded by Fredrick without the band) and Highs and Lows in 2015.

The band signed with Atom Records to release Witches!, and the digital EP Paper Boats. In 2019, the band issued a compilation of their early vinyl-only releases, The Vinyl Years, a career-spanning best-of 31 Years of Obscurity: the Best of the black watch 1988-2019, as well as another studio recording, Magic Johnson.

== Critical reception ==
Trouser Press has noted that, despite so many great reviews, it is "astonishing" that The Black Watch has only garnered a following "the size of a kitchen sponge."

== Discography ==
- St. Valentine (1988)
- Short Stories (EP, 1989)
- Flowering (1991)
- Amphetamines (1994)
- Seven Rollercoasters (EP, 1997)
- The King of Good Intentions (1999)
- Lime Green Girl (2000)
- The Christopher Smart EP (EP, 2001)
- Jiggery-Pokery (2002)
- Very Mary Beth (2003)
- The Innercity Garden (EP, 2005)
- The Hypnotizing Sea (2005)
- Tatterdemalion (2006)
- Icing the Snow Queen (2008)
- After the Gold Room (EP, 2008)
- Led Zeppelin Five (2011)
- The End Of When (2013)
- Sugarplum Fairy, Sugarplum Fairy (2015)
- Highs and Lows (2016)
- Gospel According to John (2017)
- Witches! (2018)
- Paper Boats (EP, 2018)
- Magic Johnson (2019)
- The Vinyl Years: 1988-1993 (2019)
- 31 Years of Obscurity: The Best of the black watch 1988-2019 (2019)
- Brilliant Failures (2020)
- Fromthing Somethat (2020)
- The Nothing That Is EP (2020)
- the white EP (2021)
- Here & There (2021)
- the neverland of spoken things (EP, 2022)
- future strangers (2023)
- The Morning Papers Have Given Us The Vapours (2024)
- weird rooms (2024)
