= John Andrew Fredrick =

American singer-songwriter

- Born: August 29, 1957 (age 67); Richmond, Virginia, United States
- Genres: Indie Rock
- Occupation(s): Musician, singer-songwriter, novelist, teacher
- Instrument(s): Vocals, guitar
- Years active: 1979–present

John Andrew Fredrick (born August 29, 1957, in Richmond, Virginia) is a singer, songwriter, vocalist, and novelist. He is a member of The Black Watch, an indie rock band, and is the author of four works of comic fiction and one book of film criticism. He earned a Ph.D. from UC Santa Barbara in 1985. Fredrick has taught Writing About Film and Literature as well as Freshman English at UCSB, the University of Southern California, Loyola Marymount University, and Santa Monica College.

He lives in Angelino Heights, Los Angeles. His abstract paintings of "Great Books" are on display at Santa Monica College in Drescher Hall.

== Bibliography ==
- The Knucklehead Chronicles Full Court Press (2008)
- The King of Good Intentions Verse Chorus Press (2013)
- The King of Good Intentions II Rare Bird Books, A Barnacle Book (2015)
- Your Caius Aquilla Rare Bird Books, A Barnacle Book (2017)
- Fucking Innocent: The Early Films of Wes Anderson Rare Bird Books (2017)
