= A Raccoons Lunch =

Studio album by Joe 90
- Released: September 2000
- Recorded: 1996–1999 Los Angeles
- Genre: Alternative rock, dream pop
- Length: 48:16
- Label: Silver Sky; Digital Pressure
- Producer: Chris Seefried; Adam Hamilton

Joe 90 chronology
Dream This (1999)	A Raccoons Lunch (2000)

A Raccoons Lunch was a compilation by Joe 90 of demos from the band's inception, unreleased masters and songs recorded for movies.

The album includes "When You Arrive" from the soundtrack to the film Boys and Girls and a cover of Laura Nyro's "And When I Die", the end title from the 2000 New Line Cinema movie Final Destination.

The record was released to support the 2000 tour, before the band went back into the studio to record the follow-up to Dream This. That record remains unreleased.

== Track listing ==
All tracks are written by Chris Seefried, Adam Hamilton, unless noted.

A Raccoons Lunch
No.	Title	Length
1.	"Blurred"	4:26
2.	"Cars Go By"	4:58
3.	"Speak"	4:07
4.	"Gone"	4:32
5.	"Truth" (Seefried)	4:32
6.	"Hide" (Seefried)	3:41
7.	"Slow" (Seefried)	3:27
8.	"Stop"	5:02
9.	"Make Up Your Mind"	4:55
10.	"Angels Got Away" (Seefried)	5:02
11.	"When You Arrive" (Seefried)	3:31
12.	"And When I Die" (Laura Nyro)	3:57

== Personnel ==
- Chris Seefried – vocals, electric guitar, acoustic 12 string guitar, percussion, samples, drums (on "Gone")
- Gary DeRosa – piano, casio, wurlitzer, percussion, background vocals, guitar (on "Gone")
- Craig Ruda – bass
- Adam Hamilton – drums, electric guitar, keyboards, loops

== Additional personnel ==
- Jim Wirt – production, mixing
- Robert Hawes – mixing, engineering
- Jeffrey Bender – photography
- Peter Reitzfeld – photography
- Patrik Giordino – photography
