= Roxx Gang =

American glam metal band

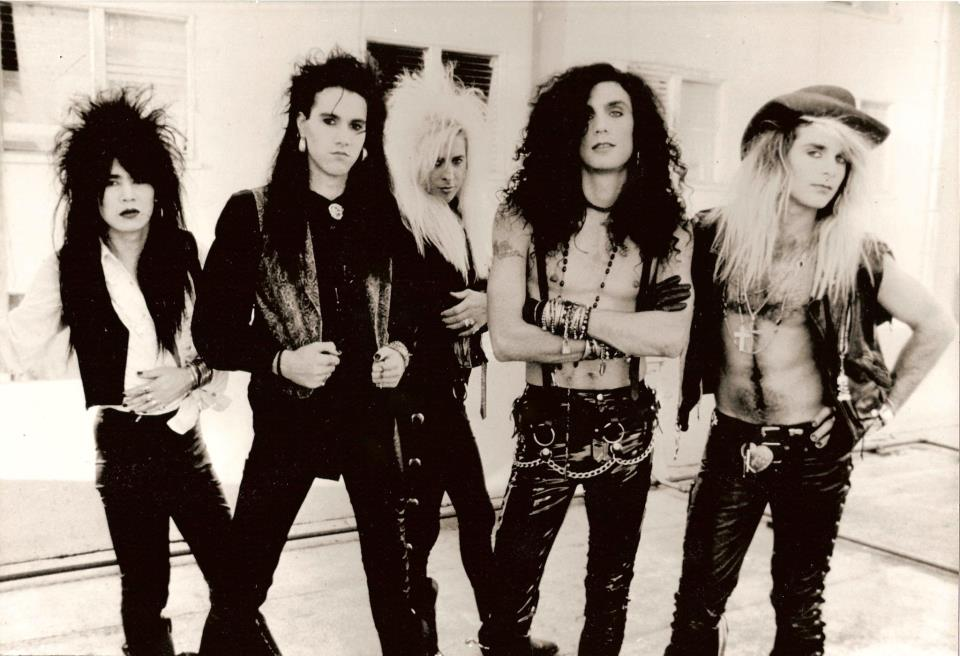

Background information
- Origin: St. Petersburg, Florida, United States
- Genres: Glam metal; hard rock
- Years active: 1982–1991, 1992–2000
- Labels: Virgin, Perris, FNA
- Spinoffs: Mojo Gurus
- Past members: Kevin Steele; Jeff Vitolo; Vinny Granese; Tommy Weder; Eric Carrell; Jeff Taylor Blanchard; Stacey Blades; Wade Hayes; Roby Strine; David James Blackshire; Dallas Perkins; Andy James; Dorian Sage; Allen Brooks; Pete Clauss; Doug Denardin

Roxx Gang was an American glam metal band formed in 1982 in St. Petersburg, Florida. It was fronted by Kevin Steele, who formed the band along with guitarist Eric Carrell.

== History ==
The band garnered record company attention in 1987 with its Love 'Em and Leave 'Em demo. The band recorded its debut album Things You've Never Done Before (1988) on Virgin Records from which it released two singles "No Easy Way Out" and "Scratch My Back" with the lineup now consisting of Steele, Jeff Taylor Blanchard (guitar), Wade Hayes (guitar), Roby "Strychnine" Strine (bass), and David James Blackshire (drums). It was produced by Beau Hill and went on to sell a quarter million copies worldwide.

This version of the band broke up in 1991 because of infighting and record company issues. Steele then formed a new version of the band along with Roby Strine, guitarist Dallas Perkins and professional session/touring drummer Andy James from NYC. Years later drummer Tommy Weder and guitarist Stacey Blades replaced James and Perkins. Strine left in 1994 and was replaced by Dorian Sage. The band released the album The Voodoo You Love, its first album since Things You've Never Done Before, and went on to release several more albums in the late 1990s. The band added guitarist Jeff Vitolo and bassist Allen Brooks replaced Sage. Soon after Roxx Gang created a blues/rock alter-ego The Mojo Gurus. Vinnie Granese replaced Brooks in 1998 and Blades left citing "musical differences" after which evolution into The Mojo Gurus became permanent.

In 2006, two of its songs off of the Things You've Never Done Before album, "Ball 'N Chain" and "No Easy Way Out" were featured in the THQ action-adventure video game Saints Row.

=== Members ===
==== Former ====
- Kevin Steele – lead vocals and harmonica (1982–1991, 1992–2000)
- Jeff Vitolo – guitar & backing vocals (1996–2000)
- Vinnie Granese – bass guitar and backing vocals (1998–2000)
- Tommy Weder – drums and backing vocals (1994–2000)
- Allen Brooks – bass guitar and backing vocals (1996–1998)
- Eric Carrell – guitar (1982–1986; died 1986)
- Jeff Taylor Blanchard – guitar (1987–1991)
- Stacey Blades – guitar (1994–1998)
- Wade Hayes – guitar (1986–1991)
- Roby "Strychnine" Strine – bass guitar (1987–1991, 1992–1994)
- David James Blackshire – drums (1987–1991)
- Dallas Perkins – guitar (1992–1994)
- Andy James – drums (1991–1994)
- Dorian Sage – bass guitar (1994–1996; died 2021)
- Pete Clauss – bass guitar (1982–1987)
- Doug Denardin – drums (1982–1987)

== Discography ==
- Love 'Em and Leave 'Em (Demo) (1987)
- Things You've Never Done Before (1988)
- The Voodoo You Love (1995)
- Mojo Gurus (1998)
- Old, New, Borrowed, and Blue (1998)
- Drinkin' T.N.T. and Smokin' Dynamite (2000)
- Bodacious Ta Tas (2001)
- Boxx of Roxx (Box Set) (2011)
- Last Laugh: The Lost Roxx Gang Demos (2014)

== See also ==
- List of glam metal bands and artists
- List of Virgin Records artists
- Music of Florida
