= Junkyard (band) =

American heavy metal band

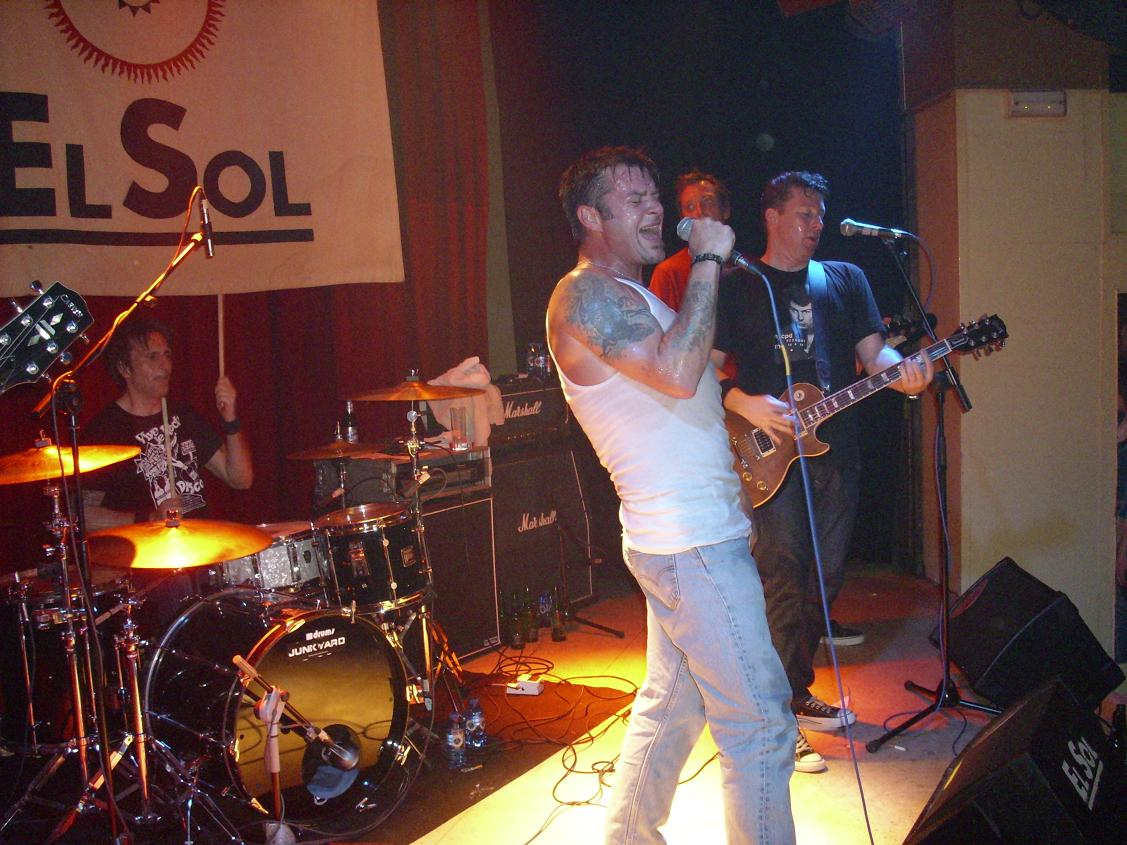
- Junkyard performing in Spain in 2008

Background information
- Origin: Los Angeles, California, U.S.
- Genres: Heavy metal; thrash metal; glam metal
- Years active: 1987–1992; 2000–present
- Labels: Acetate; Geffen
- Members: Jimmy James; Patrick Muzingo; Todd Muscat; Tim Mosher
- Past members: David Roach; Clay Anthony; Max Gottlieb; Johnny Hell; Brian Baker; Chris Gates
- Website: junkyardblooze.com

Junkyard is an American heavy hard rock band formed in 1987 in Los Angeles, with members previously in Minor Threat, Big Boys, Decry, and Dag Nasty. The band drew comparisons with Guns N' Roses (which, like Junkyard, signed with Geffen Records).

== History ==
=== Origins ===
The original lineup of the band included several members who were not a part of the group by the time they began recording. Max Gottlieb was the original guitarist and songwriter, and the original drummer was Johnny Hell and skateboarder Tony Alva was also briefly in the band. After these two left the group, the lineup stabilized around lead singer David Roach, guitarist Chris Gates, bassist Clay Anthony and drummer Patrick Muzingo. Brian Baker (guitar; ex-Dag Nasty/Minor Threat), joined the band just prior to the recording of the first album. Although the band was heavily influenced by Southern rock, Baker had told Sounds, "I hate the concept. I like that music, but I'm not into the rebel flag or the throwing up in your pickup truck."

The band was signed by Geffen Records in January 1988, with a self-titled Tom Werman-produced debut album issued in 1989, described by AllMusic as incorporating "elements of Southern rock, boogie-woogie, and AC/DCism into one compact sound." The album featured the singles "Hollywood" and "Simple Man" and featured several unnamed studio musicians. This album was followed two years later by Sixes, Sevens & Nines, produced by Ed Stasium and featuring contributions from Steve Earle. Anthony left the band shortly before the release of the second album amid drug problems, to be replaced by Todd Muscat (brother of Faster Pussycat guitarist Brent Muscat). The band was dropped by Geffen in 1992, with a third album recorded but not released, and disbanded shortly afterwards. The unreleased third album was subsequently issued as XXX and The Joker.

=== Post-breakup/reformation ===
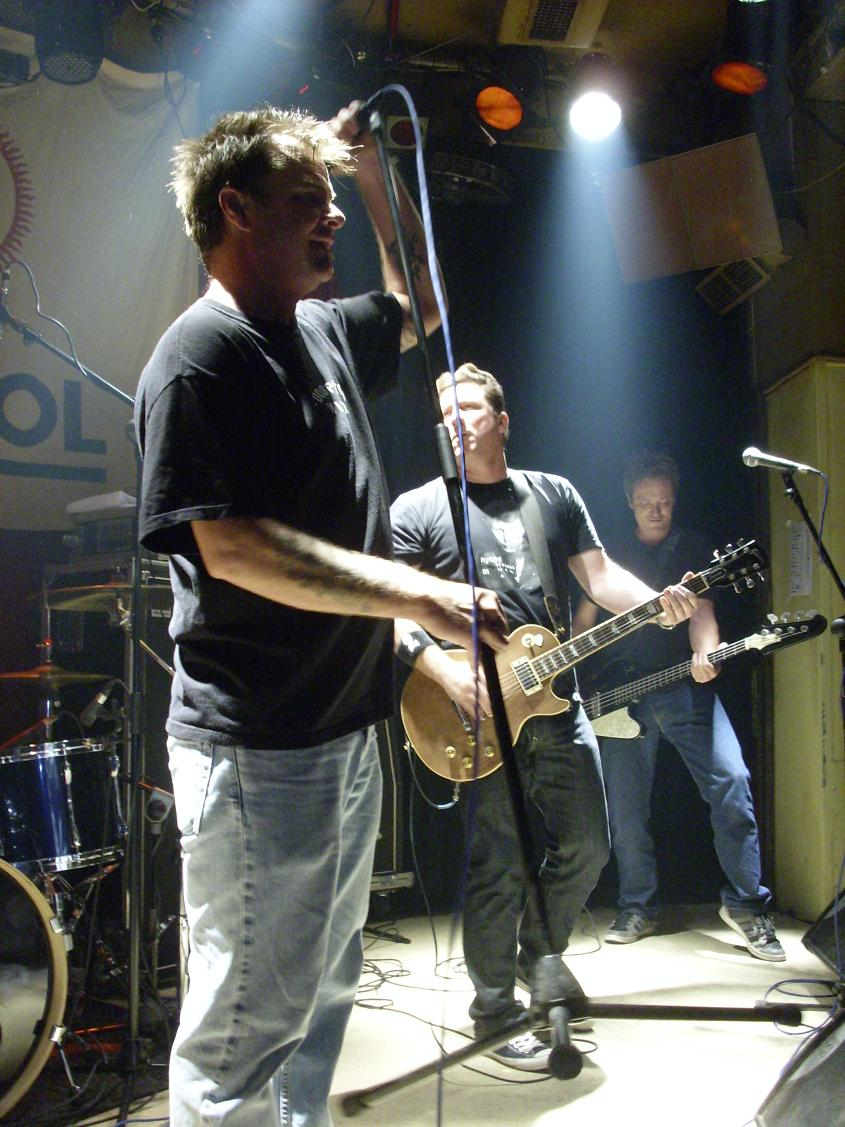
Junkyard in 2009

Roach founded Borracho with members of Promise and Dogs D'Amour, while Gates formed 99 lbs. Muzingo formed Catfish and later Battery Club. Baker, who had already become a veteran of the punk rock scene prior to joining Junkyard, went on to join Bad Religion.

A live Junkyard album, Shut Up – We're Trying to Practice!, was issued in 2000, and Baker, Roach, Muzingo and Muscat reformed the band, with Tim Mosher (guitar/vocals) added to the lineup. A tour of Japan followed, with Dogs D'Amour guitarist Jo Dog added to the lineup for these dates. The new lineup recorded the 2003 mini-album Tried and True, comprising a mixture of old and new songs.

Since 2000, the band has toured Europe twice, co-headlined the Serie Z festival (in the south of Spain) with acts that were very complimentary of the way the band should have been marketed (other bands on the festival were The Hellacopters, The Quireboys, The Wildhearts, Radio Birdman, Georgia Satellites, Michelle Gun Elephant, Nine Pound Hammer and Reverend Horton Heat), and have played a handful of shows domestically in Austin, Tulsa, and Los Angeles to name a few.

In 2008, the band released an album of previously unreleased material, originally recorded for a 1987 demo that helped get them signed to Geffen. The album is titled Put It on Ten and Pull the Knobs Off!

On July 10, 2015, Junkyard released two new songs, "Faded" b/w The River", on Unison Music Group, with a CD single and 7" vinyl following in late August.

On April 21, 2017, the band released its first studio album in almost 20 years, High Water, on Acetate Records.

On November 22, 2019, Junkyard released a studio album recorded in 1992, Old Habits Die Hard.

On September 10, 2021, Junkyard released another new single, "Lifer" b/w "Last of a Dying Breed."

At the age of 59 vocalist David Roach died of cancer on August 2, 2025.

=== Side projects ===
Outside of Junkyard, members of the band remain actively involved in individual projects: Gates with his solo outfit "Chris Gates and Gatesville", based out of Austin (Gates on Gatesville: "Once it got to be time to put a band together, fate and a bunch of mutual friends sent guitar wiz Tony Redman my way. Our first meeting was where Gatesville really began. The more we play together, the more we push each other and the music to see just what we can wring out of'er. The band went through a couple of line-up changes until we found Scott Womack on bass and Paul Soliz on drums. Once this line-up came together the band and the music took on a life of its own."); Baker with Bad Religion and Mosher with his outfit, The Light Brigade.

== Members ==
=== Current ===
- Patrick Muzingo – drums (1987–1992, 2000–present)
- Todd Muscat – bass (1991–1992, 2000–present)
- Tim Mosher – guitar (2000–present)
- Jimmy James – guitar (2017–present)

=== Former ===
- David Roach - lead vocals (1987-1992, 2000-2025; died 2025)
- Max Gottlieb – lead guitar (1987)
- Clay Anthony – bass (1987–1991; died 2020)
- Johnny Hell – drums (1987)
- Chris Gates – guitar (1987–1992, 2000-2009)
- Brian Baker – lead guitar (1989–1992, 2006–2017)

== Discography ==
=== Albums ===
Year	Album	US Billboard 200	Label
1989	Junkyard	105	Geffen
1991	Sixes, Sevens & Nines	-	Geffen
1998	Joker	-	Self-released
1998	XXX	-	Self-released
2017	High Water	-	Acetate Records

=== Other releases ===
- 2000: Shut Up – We're Trying to Practice! (live album)
- 2003: Tried and True (EP)
- 2008: Put It on Ten and Pull the Knobs Off! (compilation of previously unreleased material)

=== Singles ===
Year	Single	Chart positions		
Year	Single	US Hot 100	US Main Rock	UK
1989	"Blooze"	-	-	-
1989	"Hollywood"	-	-	-
1989	"Simple Man"	-	47	-
1991	"All the Time in the World"	-	24	-
1991	"Misery Loves Company"	-	-	-
1991	"Slippin' Away"	-	-	-
1991	"Nowhere to Go But Down"	-	-	-
2015	"Faded"	-	-	-
