= Patrick Muzingo =

American drummer (born 1965)

- Born: September 27, 1965 (age 61); Los Angeles, California, U.S.
- Genres: Hard rock; heavy metal; punk rock; cowpunk
- Occupation: Drummer
- Years active: 1983–present
- Website: junkyardblooze.com

Patrick Muzingo (born September 27, 1965) is an American drummer. He started playing the drums at 12. Hailing from Los Angeles he grew up in the 1970s and 80s with a family which boasted other musicians. Muzingo experienced the first wave of Pool skating, was one of the original Eagle Rock ramp (featured in Thrasher, Transworld Skateboarding, and others) crew, witnessed many genres of music in its infancy including the first wave of punk rock and the late 1980s signing spree of rock bands in Los Angeles.

Muzingo reflects (from a 2005 interview) on growing up during those times- "Its funny, I used to skate with so many now famous skaters. I even entered contests where I beat a few skaters that are now multi-millionaires. With the music thing I saw friends go from living with various girlfriends to owning huge houses and selling multi-platinum releases. I was in some pretty cool situations. I got to grow up with many now successful / famous people. Unfortunately, I saw many talented people fall to dependencies that lead to their own demise."

Skateboarding was a passion of his until 1983 when he had to make the decision to either go the distance skating or make the commitment to play drums full-time. He decided to go the route of a musician which proved to be the right one. From 1985 to late 1986 he decided to call San Francisco home and was playing with The Pirates of Venus which featured members of Decry, Verbal Abuse and Tales of Terror. The then "SF sound" was not "paying the bills" so he decided to split back to Los Angeles. Within 2 hours of his arrival back home he was called by Chris Gates from the Big Boys and Poison 13 (which he had met touring through Texas with Decry back in 1984) to join a then up and coming six-month-old Junkyard. Muzingo was already a fan of Gates so it was a no brainer.

From 1986 until the present he has recorded for Junkyard as well as MCA Records artists Suckerpunch, Sex Pistols' Steve Jones and country rockers Speedbuggy USA. There were many other acts which he sat in with but none released anything worth mentioning.

== Current ==
He is working as a web programmer in California, playing drums full-time with Junkyard. The most recent release (May 2020) is Junkyards "Rome is Burning" (digital only).

Muzingo continues skateboarding and running daily thanks to his wife and daughter.

== Associated acts ==
- The Atoms
  Members included Guns N' Roses guitarist Jeff Isbell aka Izzy Stradlin, D.F.L. vocalist Monty Messex, Lip Service Clothing owner Drew Bernstein on guitar, bassist Oscar Harvey and Taz Rudd on guitar. The band opened up for many acts including the original Misfits, Social Distortion, T.S.O.L., D.O.A., a Canadian band, etc.
- S.V.D.B.
  Members include guitarist Vic Makauskas of Painted Willie and vocalist Brandon Cruz with the Dead Kennedys. The group put out 4 releases on Mystic Records from 1980–1983
- The Tourists
  BYO Compilation "Something to Believe in". Song- "Memories" BYO Records 1983
- Americas Hardcore/Section Eight
  Founded by Lip Service Clothing owner Drew Bernstein on guitar. Various releases on Mystic records. All Mystic drum tracks were played by Muzingo. He was later replaced by good friend Aaron Glascock who was credited on most of the Mystic tracks.
- Decry
  From 1983–1986 the band toured the US quite a few times and was featured on many radio shows such as Rodney on the Roq. Many bands opened for Decry including Guns N' Roses, L.A. Guns, Raw Power, Corrosion of Conformity, and CH3 to name a few. In 1996 Cleopatra Records released a retrospective on the band. The band is currently reformed with original singer Farrell Holtz. In 1990 original Decry bassist Todd Muscat (Kill for Thrills) joined Muzingo again as the bassist for Junkyard.
- Shanghai
  Offshoot of Decry with original Symbol Six singer Eric Leach and guitarist Taz Rudd. Band worked extensively with Kim Fowley in 1987.
- The Pirates of Venus
  Featured vocalist "Rats Ass" from punk legends Tales of Terror and guitarist Joie Mastrokalos from Verbal Abuse, Circle of Soul and Duff McKagan's solo band.
- Battery Club
  Formed band with MTV V.J. Riki Rachtman
- The Rhythm Slaves
  Formed with guitarist Brian Forsythe from KIX and Rhino Bucket and bassist of Faster Pussycat.
- Catfish
  Offshoot of The Rhythm Slaves with Brian Forsythe from KIX and Adam White AKA Rail of Liars Inc.
- High City Miles/Suckerpunch
  Suckerpunch was released in 1996 on 510/MCA records. The band did spot touring with Cheap Trick, Bad Religion and US Bombs. Imprint label (510 records) folded in 1997. Band featured former members of Broken Glass and The Cult and current guitarist of Junkyard. Suckerpunch has also featured on many TV shows. The band recently reunited after 20+ years, with all 4 original members returning. The entirety of their album was performed at the Viper Room, West Hollywood on February 2, 2019.
- Smack/The Wyndham Stalls
  Band was featured on Howard Stern's radio show before splitting up in early 2004.
- Speedbuggy USA
  There are too many releases to quote here. Extensive world tours for 8+ years.
- Junkyard
  The band existed between the years 1986–1992. Many tours of the US and England headlining and opening up for Lynyrd Skynyrd, The Almighty, The Black Crowes, The Supersuckers, Guns N' Roses, Soul Asylum, Danzig, Social Distortion, Jane's Addiction, and more. Junkyard disbanded in late 1992 only to reform again in 1999 to do a 5 city tour of Japan. Since 1999 they have done sporadic shows including the Serie Z Spanish music festival in mid-2003 and have released a live CD and a 6-song EP of new material. From 2014 – present Junkyard continues to put out new music and tour the world.

== Drums/endorsements ==
1991–1993, 2015–present – Endorses DW (Drum Workshop) Drums, Pedals and Hardware

July 10, 2019 – Officially endorses Centent Cymbals July 31, 2018 – Officially endorses Aquarian Drumheads May 18, 2016 – Officially endorses Los Cabos Drumsticks. Stick preference: White Hickory Rock model (D=.626" L=16.63")

Current Setup

DW (Drum Workshop) Collector's Series® White Glass

- 5.5x14 Collector's Series® Black Nickel over Brass
- 5.5x14 Collector's Series® Aluminum
- 5x15 Contemporary Classic® Transparent Light Purple Over Ultra White Marine Snare (Poplar/Mahogany)
- 5x16 Collector's Series® Clear Acrylic Snare
- 5x16 Maple Snare drum
- 14x26 bass
- 9x13 Rack Tom
- 16x18 Floor Tom

All DW Hardware and Pedals

1991 DW (Drum Workshop) Maple kit. White Marine Pearl FinishPly™

- 18x26 bass
- 11x14 Rack Tom
- 16x18 Floor Tom

Centent Cymbals

- 20" LAD Crash
- 22" LAD Custom Ride (3290 g)

Aquarian Drumheads

- Super-2 Clear w/ Power Dot (Snare & Floor Tom)
- Super Kick II (Bass Drum)
