= Rips the Covers Off =

Studio album by L.A. Guns
- Released: April 27, 2004
- Genres: Hard rock, glam metal

L.A. Guns chronology
| Ultimate L.A. Guns (2002) | Rips the Covers Off (2004) | Hollywood Raw: The Original Sessions (2004) |

Professional ratings
Review scores
| Source | Rating |
|---|---|
| AllMusic | 3/5 stars |

Rips the Covers Off, some copies of which are titled Rips Off the Covers, is an album by Phil Lewis' version of L.A. Guns, their first with guitarist Stacey Blades.

The studio portion of the album (songs 1–11) consists of cover songs with guitarist Stacey Blades, though songs 12 and 13 are live versions of "Revolution" and "Don't Look at Me That Way", with guitarists Keri Kelli and Brent Muscat. Mixed by the band's live sound engineer.Jay Frederic during one of their tours. The record was produced by legendary producer Andy Johns.

A different line-up of L.A. Guns had previously recorded a cover of Led Zeppelin's "Custard Pie" on Hollywood Rehearsal.

== Track listing ==
1. "Rock 'n' Roll Outlaw" (Rose Tattoo cover)
2. "I Just Want to Make Love to You" (Muddy Waters cover)
3. "Tie Your Mother Down" (Queen cover)
4. "Until I Get You" (Hanoi Rocks cover)
5. "Wheels of Steel" (Saxon cover)
6. "Nobody's Fault" (Aerosmith cover)
7. "Custard Pie" (Led Zeppelin cover)
8. "Moonage Daydream" (David Bowie cover)
9. "Marseilles" (Angel City cover)
10. "Hurdy Gurdy Man" (Donovan cover)
11. "Search and Destroy" (The Stooges cover)
12. "Revolution" (Live)
13. "Don't Look at Me That Way" (Live)

== Lineup ==
Tracks 1–11

- Phil Lewis - vocals
- Stacey Blades - guitars
- Adam Hamilton - bass
- Steve Riley - drums

Tracks 12–13

- Phil Lewis - vocals
- Keri Kelli - guitars
- Brent Muscat - guitars
- Adam Hamilton - bass
- Steve Riley - drums
