= Dream This =

Studio album by Joe 90
- Released: 1999
- Recorded: January–February 1999, Los Angeles
- Genres: Alternative rock, dream pop
- Length: 51:45
- Labels: E Pluribus Unum; Geffen
- Producers: Chris Seefried; Adam Hamilton

Joe 90 chronology
Aluminum (1996)	Dream This (1999)	A Raccoons Lunch (2000)

Singles from Dream This
- 1. "Drive" Released: September 1999

Dream This is the debut album by Joe 90, released on Adam Duritz's label E Pluribus Unum through Geffen Records.

== Critical reception ==
Professional ratings
Review scores
Source	Rating
AllMusic	3/5 stars
Rolling Stone	3/5 stars

Rolling Stone wrote that "singer-guitarist Chris Seefried steers along melodically facile, softly yelping rockers like 'Mascara' and 'Drive' - the album's showstopper - with velvety imprecision." The Washington Post called it "a modestly appealing pop-rock release, boasting a few intriguing lyrics and more than its share of sturdy melodic hooks." The San Francisco Examiner labeled the album "a charmer, a bouquet of instantly hummable songs that mix sunny melodies with provocative lyrics."

== Track listing ==
All tracks are written by Chris Seefried and Adam Hamilton unless noted.

No.	Title	Length
1.	"Ferris Wheel" (Seefried, Ruda)	5:17
2.	"Park Hill" (Seefried)	:31
3.	"Drive"	4:07
4.	"Truth" (Seefried)	5:11
5.	"Flatline Static" (Seefried, Ruda)	5:05
6.	"November Bombs"	5:03
7.	"Super Hero" (Seefried)	5:04
8.	"Mascara"	4:57
9.	"Look" (Seefried)	2:30
10.	"Blurred" (Seefried, DeRosa, Hamilton)	4:32
11.	"Cars Go By"	5:30
12.	"Just a Dream"	5:00

== Personnel ==
- Chris Seefried – vocals, electric guitar, acoustic guitar, slide guitar, mellotron, piano, samples
- Gary DeRosa – piano, wurlitzer, organ, casio, synthesizer, percussion, background vocals
- Craig Ruda – bass, loop guitar
- Adam Hamilton – drums, electric guitar, bass, samples, loops

Additional personnel

- Adam Duritz – vocals
- Scott Wolf – handclapping
- Stan Lynch – production
- Tony Visconti – mixing
- Stephen Marcussen – mastering
- Daphne Chen – violin
- Daniel Rosa – violin
- Bo Dong – viola
- Fang Fang Xu – cello
- Morty Coyle – vocal harmony
- Mark Dutton – production, mixing
- Rob Jacobs – mixing
- Robert Hawes – mixing, engineering
- Jeffrey Bender – photography
- Peter Reitzfeld – photography
- Star Jasper – photography
