= Joe 90 (band) =

American alternative rock band

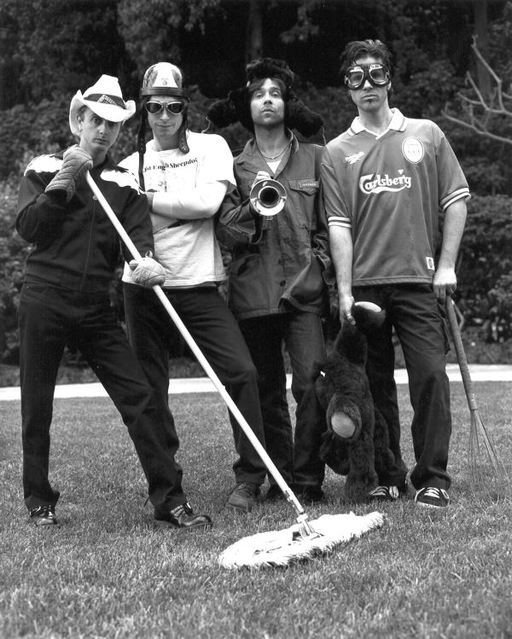

Background information
- Genres: Alternative rock, dream pop, psychedelic rock
- Years active: 1994–2000
- Labels: Warner Bros. Geffen; E Pluribus Unum
- Spinoff of: Gods Child
- Members: Chris Seefried; Gary DeRosa; Craig Ruda; Adam Hamilton
- Past members: Alex Alexander; Sean Pelton; Mark Plati
- Website: Myspace page

Joe 90 is an alternative rock band, which was formed from the group Gods Child, based in New York City, and was later relocated to Los Angeles. Band members include Chris Seefried, Gary DeRosa, Craig Ruda, and Adam Hamilton.

== History ==
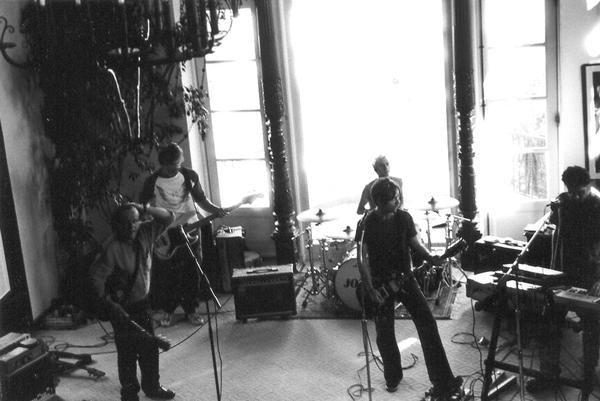
Joe 90 rehearsing with Donovan at Park Hill, Los Angeles

Gods Child had released a handful of albums for Warner Brothers records. They had a hit in 1994 with the song "Everybody's 1", which appeared on the Billboard "Modern Rock" and "Album Rock" categories simultaneously.

The band moved to Los Angeles in 1996 and recruited Hamilton as a drummer.

Seefried and Hamilton wrote the song "Sleeping Pill" to be featured on a CD sampler released by the trade magazine Album Network. The song was credited to "The Amazing Adventures of Joe 90", a reference to the 1968 animated television series Joe 90. The band eventually took on the name.

In September 1999, the band released their debut CD under the new moniker. The album, Dream This, was released through the E Pluribus Unum label, under the Universal label. Joe 90 embarked on a cross-country tour in support of the album, from October 1999 through February 2000. They toured alongside Counting Crows.

Their first single, "Drive", (featuring Adam Duritz on counter lead vocals) garnered major radio airplay across the country and was featured in the second season of Six Feet Under. Song "Cars Go By" was the end title for New Line Cinema 1999 film Body Shots.

The band's final record remains unreleased.

== Discography ==
=== Albums ===
- Dream This (1999)
- A Raccoons Lunch (2000)

=== Singles ===
- "Drive" (1999)
